= Holden Monaro =

Coupé and sedan (1973–1979) from Holden, 1968–2006

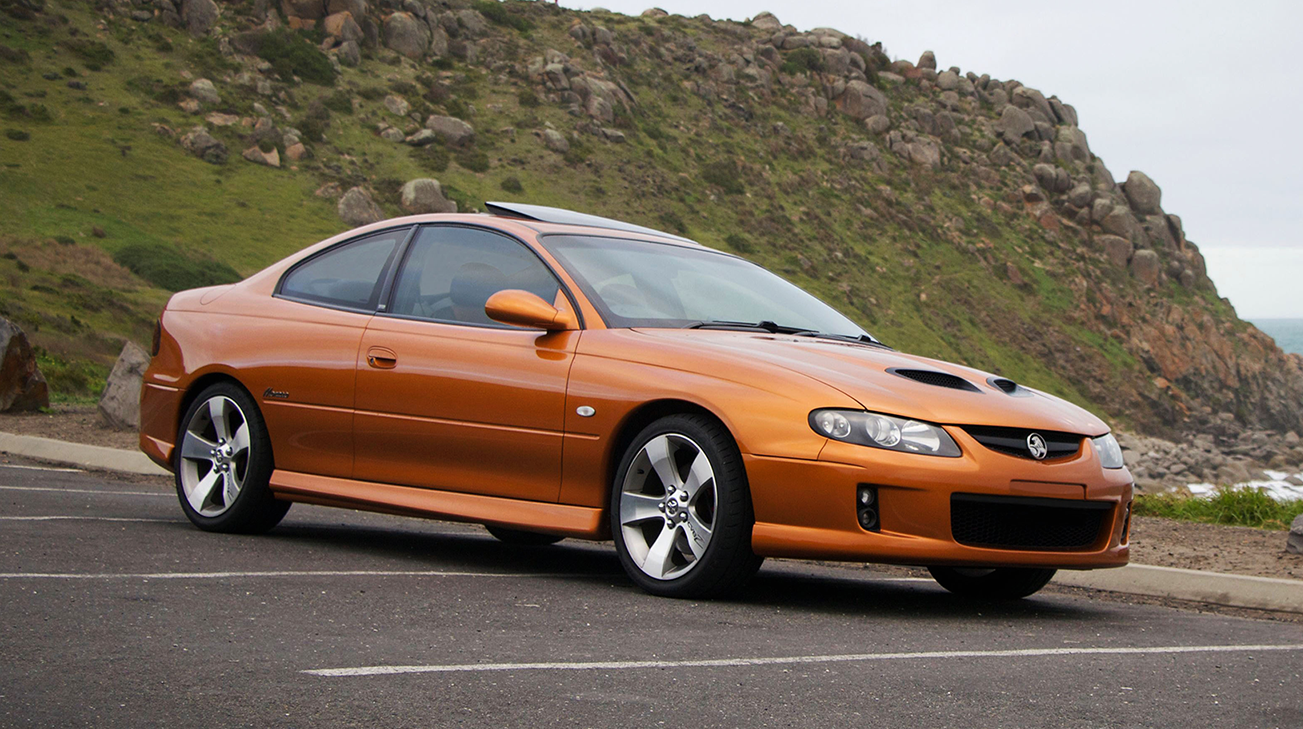
- 2005–2006 Holden Monaro (VZ) CV8-Z

Overview
- Manufacturer: Holden (General Motors)
- Also called: Chevrolet Lumina Coupé; Holden GTS; Holden Limited Edition; HSV Coupé GTS/GTO; Pontiac GTO; Vauxhall Monaro
- Production: 1968–1979; 2001–2006

Body and chassis
- Class: Muscle car Sports car (2001–2006)
- Body style: 2-door coupé; 2-door hardtop; 4-door sedan
- Layout: Front-engine, rear-wheel drive

The Holden Monaro (/məˈnɑːroʊ/ Mon-AH-ro) is a car that was manufactured by General Motors' Australian division Holden. It has a front-engine, rear-wheel-drive layout and was produced with a two-door coupé body from 1968 to 1976 and again from 2001 to 2006 and with a four-door sedan body from 1973 to 1979.

Three generations of the Monaro coupe have been produced, the first covering the HK, HT, and HG series from 1968 to 1971, the second covering the HQ, HJ, HX, and HZ series from 1971 to 1979, and the third covering the VX, VY, and VZ series from 2001 to 2006.

The first-generation Monaro coupe was also manufactured by General Motors South Africa from 1970 to 1973, using knock-down kits imported from Australia.

The third-generation Monaro coupe was manufactured not only for domestic Australian consumption, but also for export, as variously a Chevrolet Lumina Coupe (Middle East), Vauxhall Monaro (UK), or Pontiac GTO-badged vehicle (USA). The third generation was also "remanufactured" in Australia by Holden Special Vehicles (HSV), from 2001 to 2006, marketed in a range of HSV-badged high performance derivatives without application of the Monaro nameplate.

== First generation (1968–1971) ==
First generation
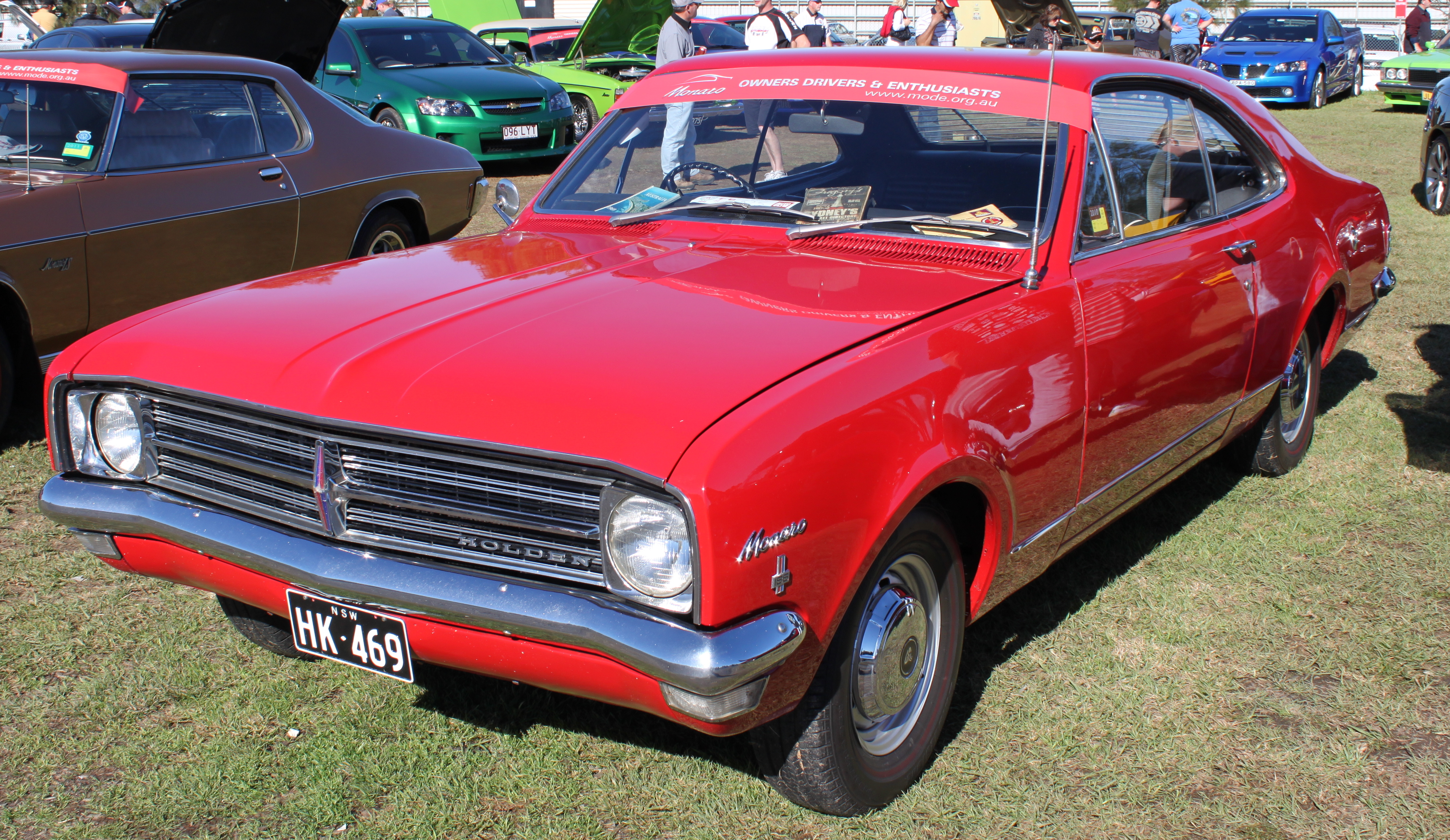
- 1968–1969 Holden Monaro (HK)

Overview
- Also called: Chevrolet SS (South Africa)
- Production: 1968–1971
- Assembly: Australia: Adelaide, South Australia (Elizabeth), Brisbane, Queensland (Acacia Ridge), Melbourne (Pagewood); South Africa: Port Elizabeth (GMSA)
- Designer: John Schinella (HK); Peter Nankervis (HT)

Powertrain
- Engine: 2.6 L (161 cu in) Holden Red I6 (base); 3.0 L (186 cu in) Holden Red I6 (GTS with an uprated 186S only); 4.1 L (253 cu in) Holden V8; 5.0 L (307 cu in) GM 307 V8; 5.0 L (308 cu in) Holden V8; 5.4 L (327 cu in) GM 327 V8; 5.7 L (350 cu in) GM 350 V8
- Transmission: 2-speed power glide automatic; 3-speed automatic; 4-speed manual

=== HK ===
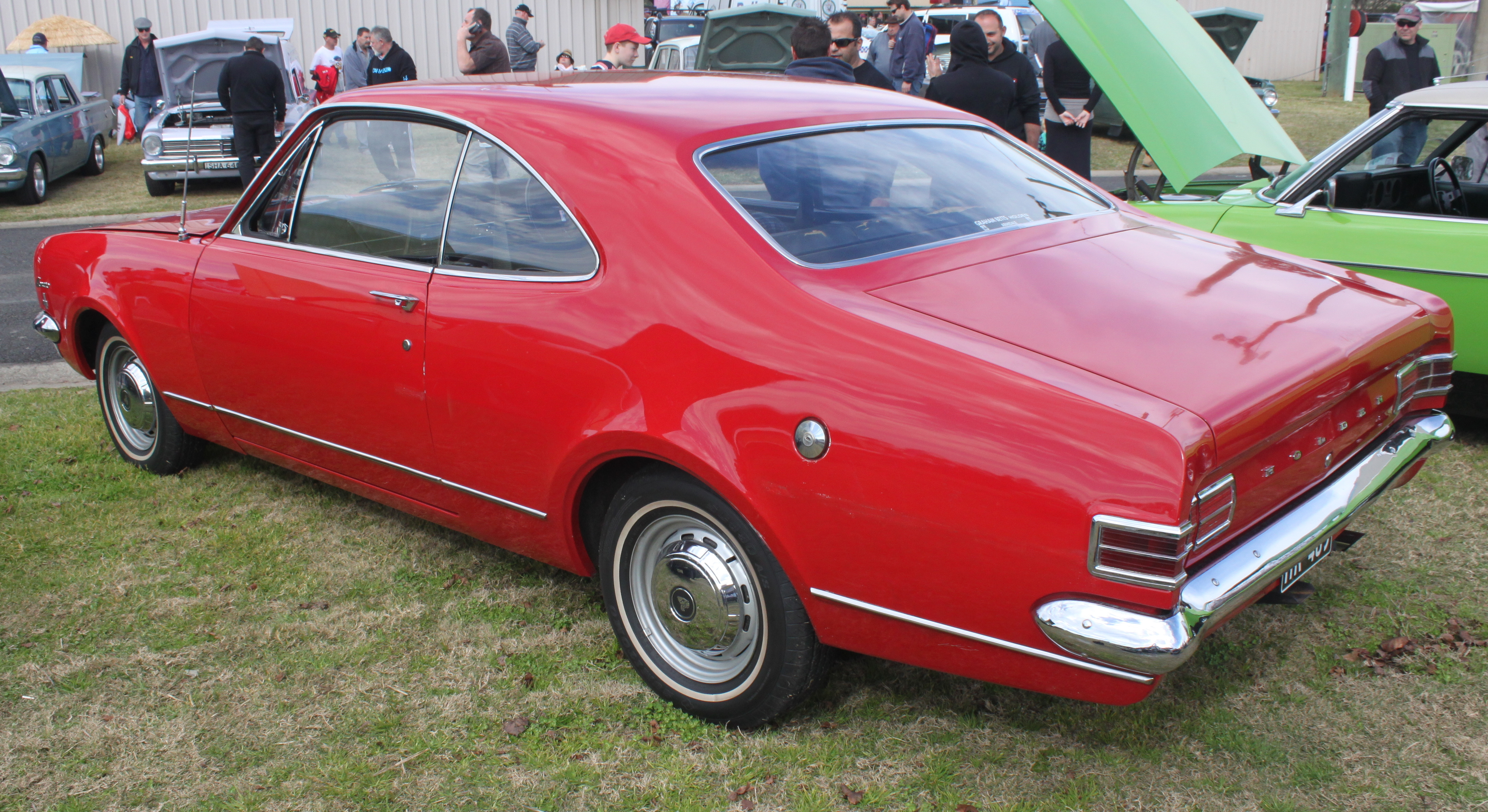
1968–1969 Holden Monaro (HK) coupe

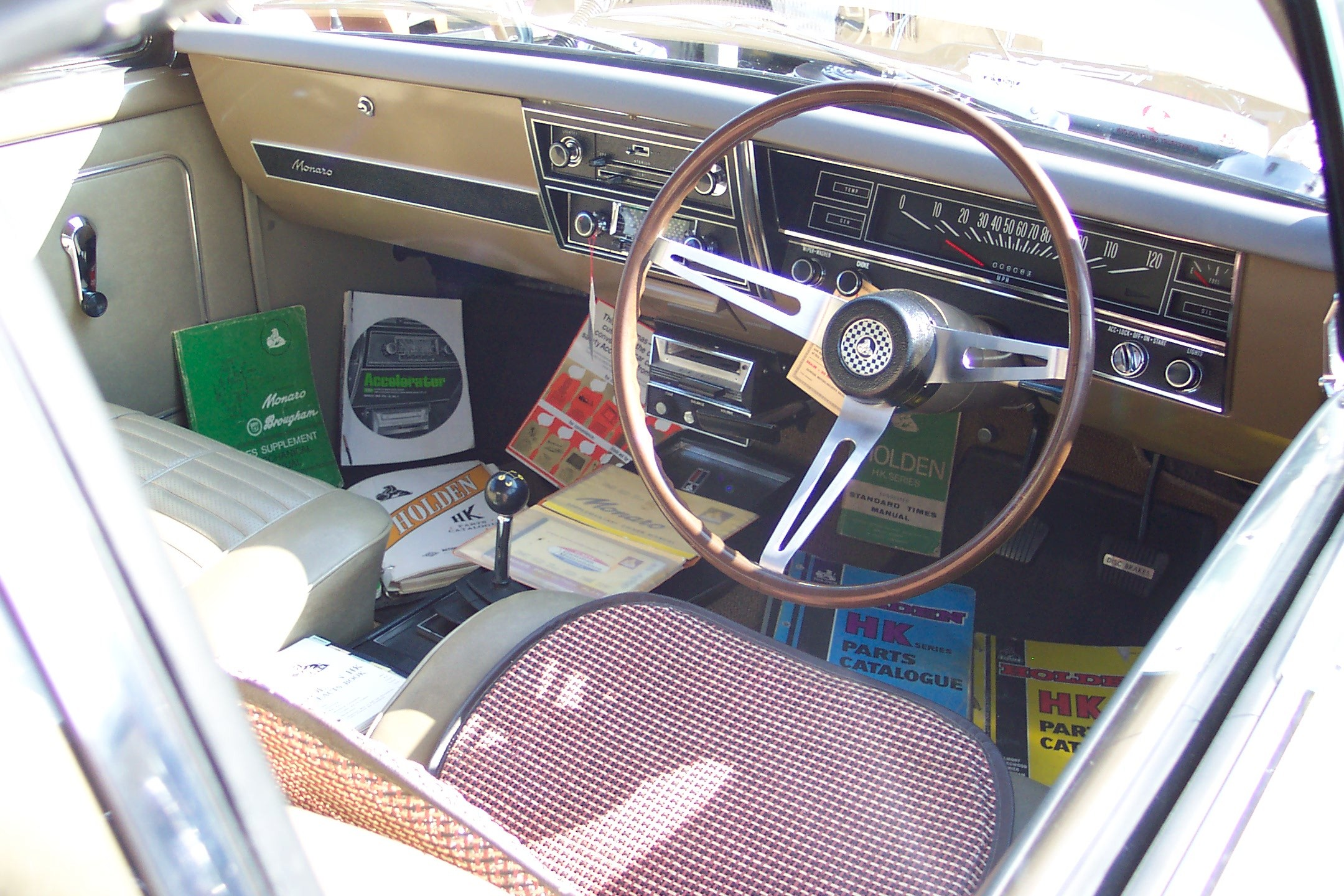
Interior

Named after the Monaro region in New South Wales (although pronounced differently), Holden's new coupé was introduced in July 1968 in a two-door pillarless hardtop design available in three models: base, GTS, and GTS 327. The GTS versions had the full instrumentation installed, which included a tachometer mounted on the centre console. This proved to be a bad location, as the driver's knee would obstruct the view and it often rattled.

The base Monaro had a standard 161 in^{3} (2,640 cc) straight-six engine or the extra-cost options of two versions of 186 in^{3} (3,050 cc) straight-six engines (Monaro GTS came standard with the more powerful 186 'S' engine), and both base model and GTS could be optioned with a 307 in^{3} (5,030 cc) Chevrolet-sourced V8 engine.

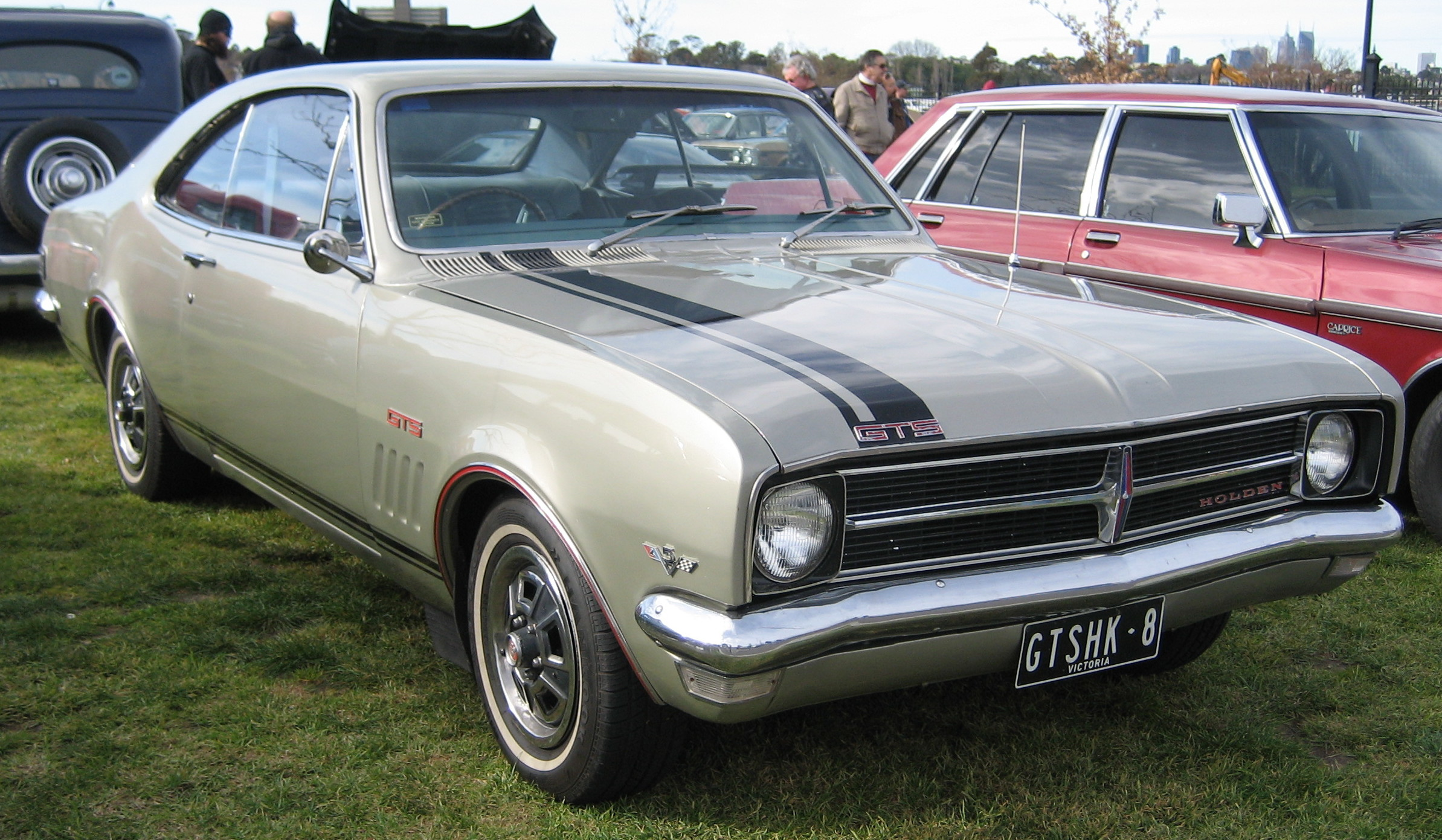
1968–1969 Holden Monaro GTS (HK)

The exclusive Monaro 'GTS 327' model was powered by a 327 in^{3} (5,360 cc) Chevrolet V8 engine rated at 250 hp (186 kW), available only with a four-speed manual transmission.

Despite the styling being unique, the Monaro nevertheless featured styling cues derived from GM designs, employing a "coke bottle" look similar to that of the Camaro, Corvair, and Nova coupés of the late 1960s.

After Holden engineers had originally claimed that the Monaro's engine bay was too small to house the 327 Chevrolet V8, a decision was made to speed up the development of Holden's first-ever Australian-developed and manufactured V8 engine, the 253 in^{3} (4.1 L; 4,145.9 cc) and larger capacity 308 in^{3} (5.0 L; 5,047.2 cc) Holden V8 engine. This particular V8 engine project ran behind schedule, which led to engineers remeasuring the engine bay and finding that the original measurement calculations had been incorrect, thus allowing the use of the imported Chevrolet engines.

A total of 8,945 HK Monaros were manufactured.

The HK Monaro GTS327 gave Holden its first victory in the 1968 Hardie-Ferodo 500 at the hands of Bruce McPhee and co-driver Barry Mulholland. Whilst Mulholland only drove one of the total 130 race laps, McPhee drove the remainder and also scored both pole position and fastest lap of the race.

Norm Beechey drove a HK Monaro GTS327 to third place in the 1969 Australian Touring Car Championship, the first time the ATCC was held as a series rather than a single race. Beechey showed the capabilities of the Monaro when he won the final two rounds of the five-round series at Surfers Paradise and Symmons Plains.

In early 1969, the HK Monaro range was awarded Wheels magazine's Car of the Year for 1968.

=== HT ===
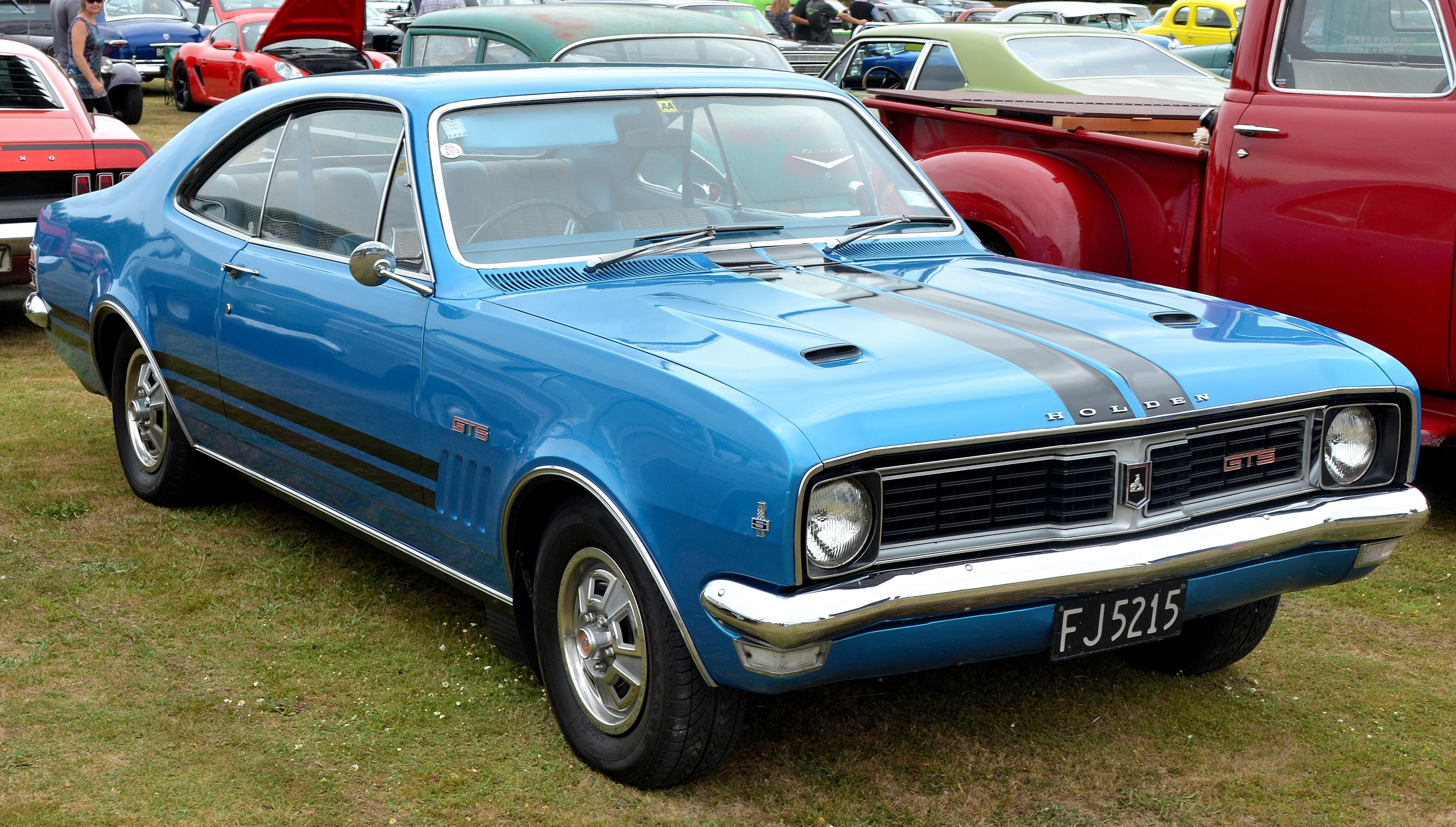
1969–1970 Holden Monaro GTS (HT)

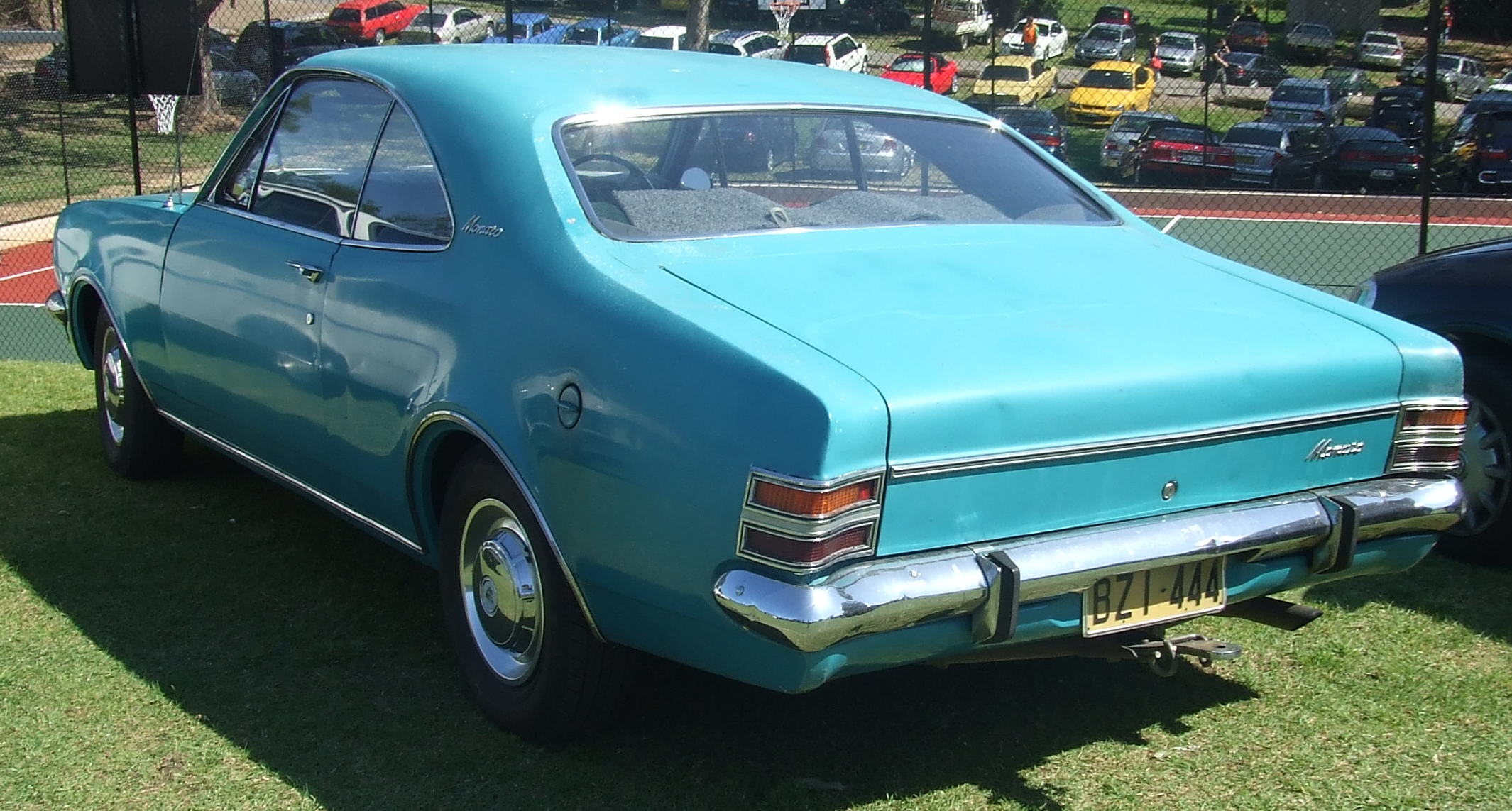
1969–1970 Holden Monaro (HT)

In June 1969, the HK Monaro was replaced by the facelifted HT Monaro. The 'GTS 327' became the 'GTS 350' with the replacement of the Chevrolet 327 in^{3} (5.4 L) V8 by the 300 hp (224 kW) Chevrolet 350 in^{3} (5.7 L) V8. As the Monaro was Holden's main car in Series Production racing, this was primarily in response to Ford, which had introduced the XW Falcon GTHO Phase I in 1969. Also, an automatic version of the 'GTS 350' was introduced, which used a lower-power version of the 350 engine coupled to a two-speed Powerglide transmission. HT Monaro also marked the phasing out of the 5.0-litre Chevrolet V8, and the introduction of Holden's own locally made V8 engines, the 4.2-litre 253, and the 5.0-litre 308. Late in the HT model run, a new, locally produced three-speed automatic transmission, the Trimatic, was offered as an option, although it was not available on the 'GTS 350'.

The HT Monaro can be distinguished from the HK by the adoption of plastic grilles (previously metal), two-section taillights separated by a blacked out panel, a round speedometer instead of "strip" style allowing for bringing the tachometer into the main instrument cluster instead of on the floor console, rubber front suspension bushings instead of the HK's sintered bronze, and larger taillights, where the turn indicators also wrapped around the now-slightly undercut edges. Bodywork "go-faster" stripe designs (delete options) varied for each series; HK stripes were offset to the driver's side of the bonnet (hood) and bootlid (trunk), the HT had two broad stripes down the centre of the car. HTs also had twin air scoops / vents incorporated into their bonnets, which served no real purpose in delivering air into the engine bay. A total of 14,437 were manufactured.

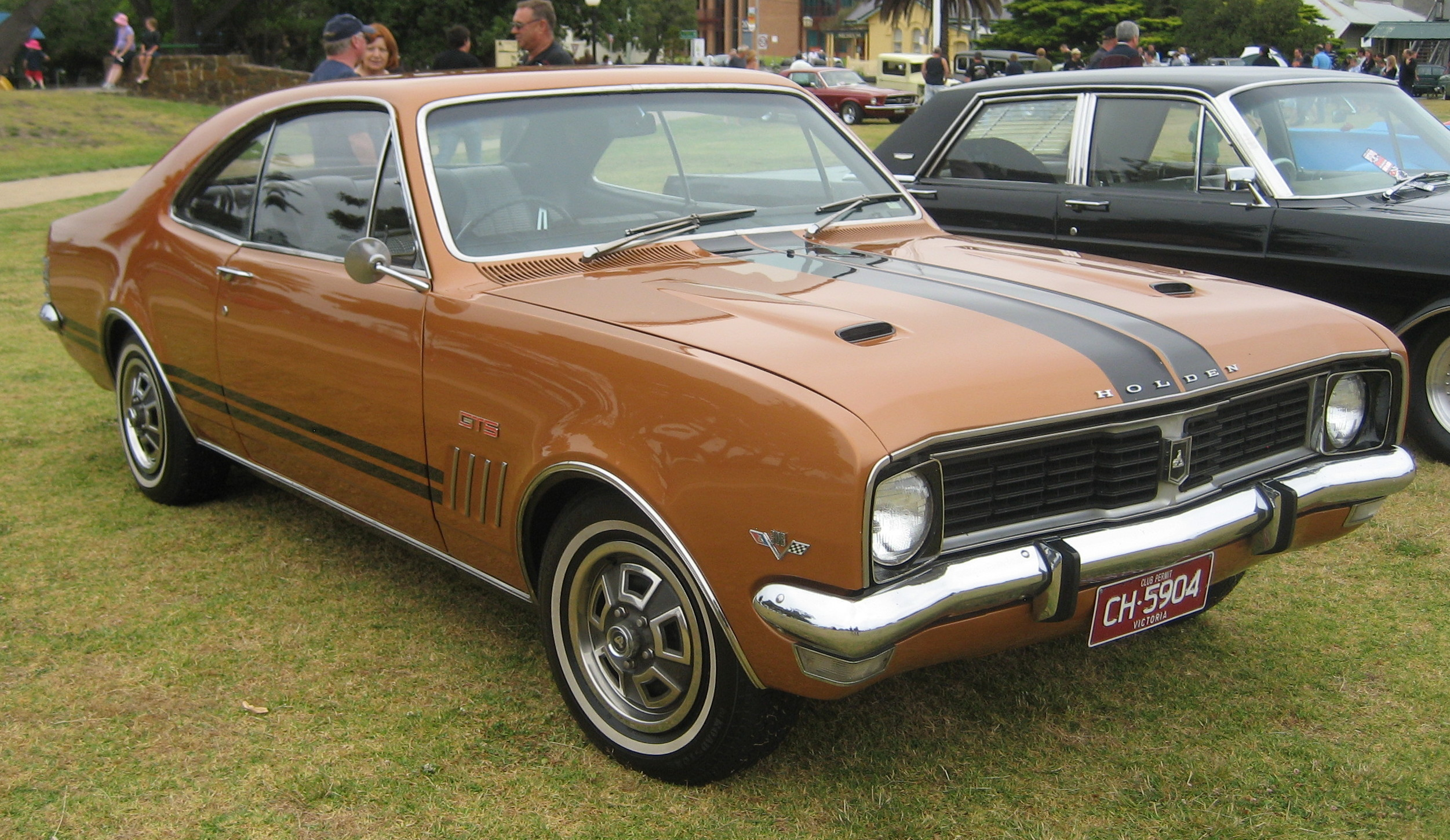
1969–1970 Holden Monaro GTS (HT)

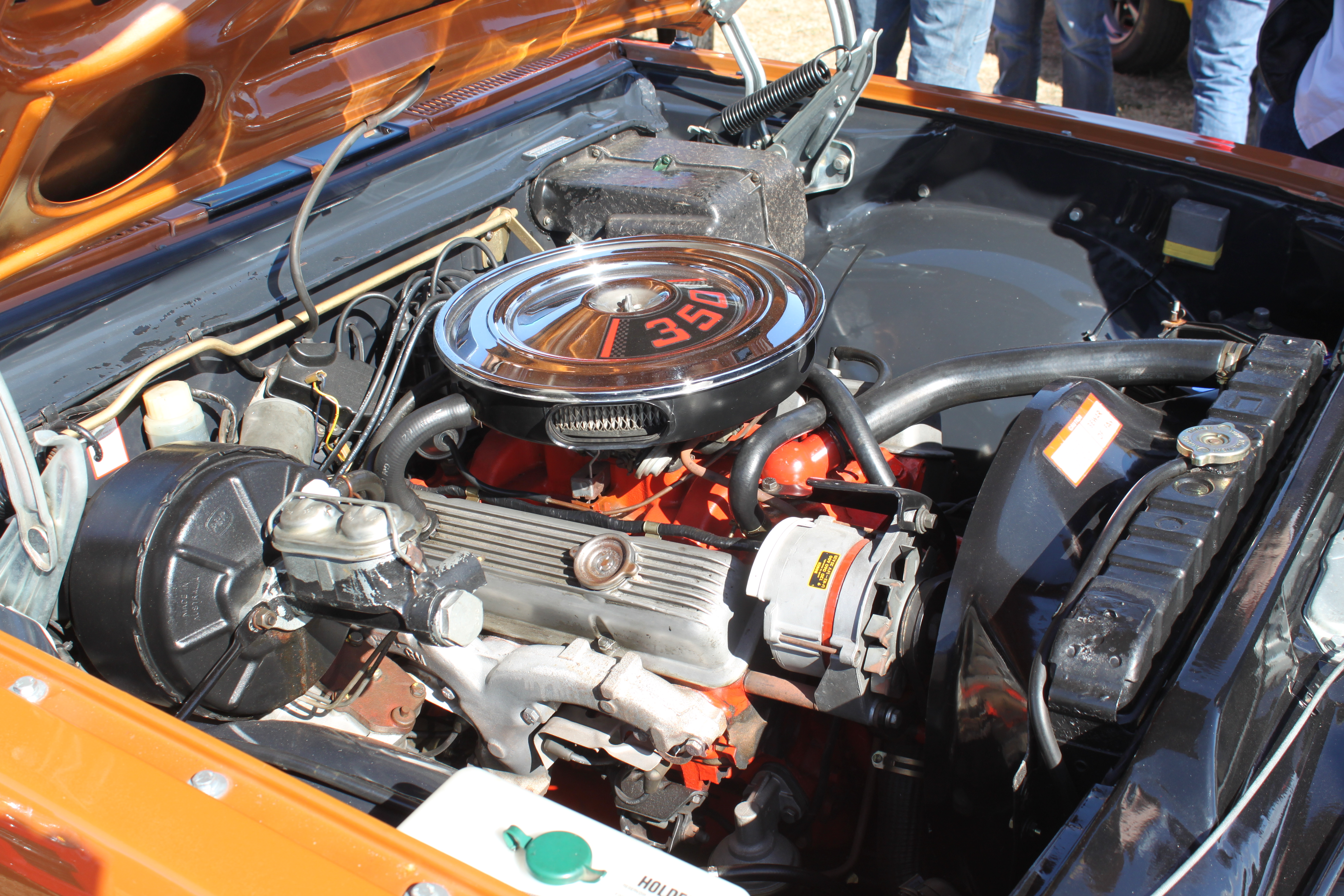
GTS350 engine bay

The HT Monaro GTS350 was successful in Series Production racing. The Holden Dealer Team was formed in 1969 by longtime Ford Works Team boss Harry Firth with the team using the GTS350 in competition. The HDT entered three Monaros in the 1969 Hardie-Ferodo 500, the lead car driven by Colin Bond and Tony Roberts winning from 1968 winners Bruce McPhee and Barry Mulholland, who had switched to driving a Falcon GTHO. Coming home third in the Dealer Team's third Monaro was Des West and Bathurst rookie Peter Brock.

In January 1970, Bond and Roberts won the Rothmans 12 Hour Series Production race at Surfers Paradise driving their HDT Holden Monaro.

Norm Beechey upgraded to a HT GTS350 and won the 1970 Australian Touring Car Championship, Holden's first ATCC championship success. Beechey won three of the seven rounds at Bathurst, Sandown, and Lakeside, where he wrapped up the title. The 550 bhp (410 kW) Monaro (which Beechey and his chief mechanic Pat Purcell had bored out from 5.7 to 6.0 litres) proved too much for the opposition, which included defending champion Ian Geoghegan in his Ford Mustang, Allan Moffat in his Ford Mustang Boss 302 Trans-Am, Bob Jane's Mustang, and Beechey's own teammate Jim McKeown in a Porsche 911S. Beechey's win was all the more remarkable considering he failed to finish at Warwick Farm and did not start the final round at Symmons Plains after suffering an engine failure in qualifying. He also finished second to Geoghegan in round four at Mallala.

Beechey continued to run the Monaro (dubbed Trans-Aus in reference to its Australian build compared to the American Trans-Am cars of his opposition) for another two seasons, though unreliability plagued the car in 1971 and 1972. Norm only finished fifth in the 1971 ATCC, winning only round two at Calder. The 1972 ATCC had Beechey retire from the first three rounds at Symmons Plains, Calder, and Bathurst before his only points for the series came from a third place in round four at Sandown Park. At the end of 1972 as a result of the Supercar scare, the Improved Production class was shut down by Confederation of Australian Motor Sport with a new production-based Group C touring car class introduced for which the Monaro was not eligible to race.

=== HG ===
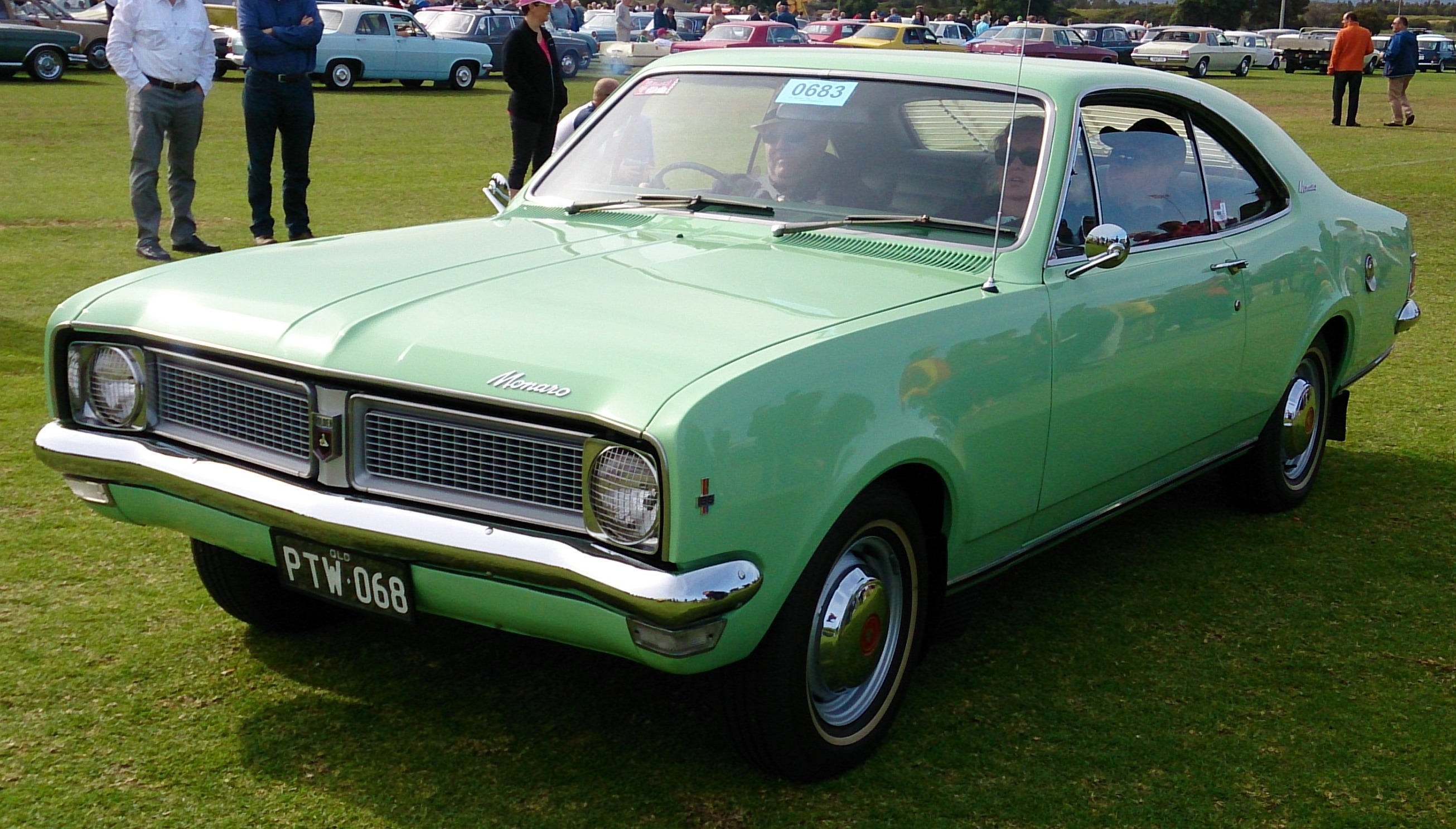
1970–1971 Holden Monaro (HG)

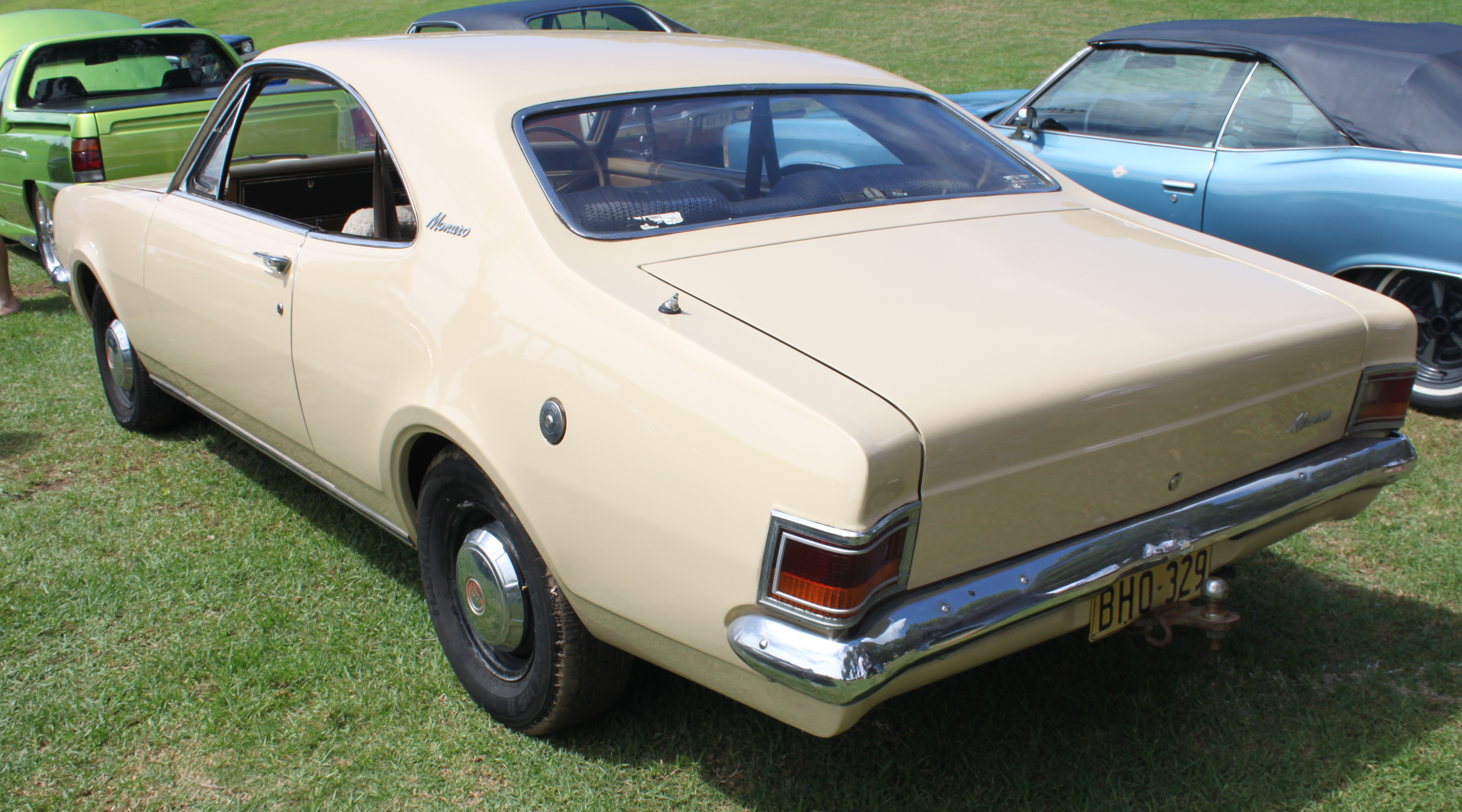
Rear

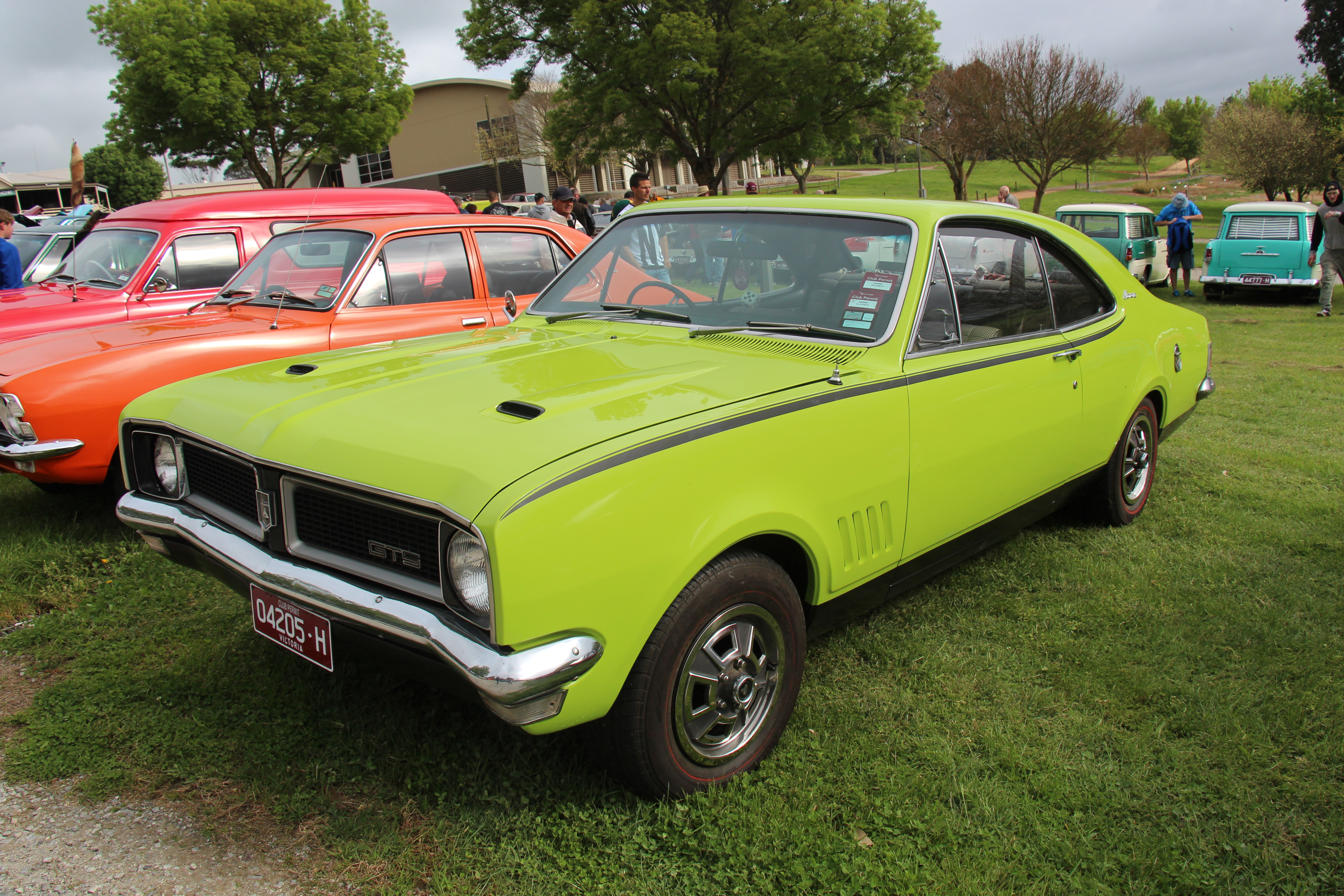
1970–1971 Holden Monaro GTS (HG)

Unveiled on 26 July 1970, the HG Monaro was the last of the original coupé design concept. HG had cleaner lines with redesigned exterior trim pieces. The HG sported different stripes (delete options) known as "sidewinder" stripes which ran along the top edge of the fenders, under the windows and finishing just before the rear pillar. The "Monaro" badge on both rear pillars was introduced to all models. For the HG GTS, the "GTS" badges now featured black paint fill, received new black-out paint on rocker panels, with the GTS 350 getting bold treatment with new "sidewinder" stripes and black bonnet scoop. "GTS 350" designations now featured gutsier decals on the fenders and boot lid. Wheel arch moldings were deleted on all models. The "GTS 350" models no longer had the 350 Chevrolet badge on the fender, but rather a bold decal stating "350" as well as blackout treatment that covered the air-vents on the bonnet. The GTS badge originally above the gills in the fenders would be removed and would now be black instead of red (with the badges being placed on the passenger side of the grille and boot). The taillights had a cleaner look and the grille was redesigned.

Most mechanical specifications remained the same as HT series, with the exception of Monaro GTS (non-350), which had softened suspension, resulting in a smoother ride. Manual HG GTS 350 retained the suspension from the HT GTS 350. Other upgrades included thicker (HT GTS 350 style) power front disc brakes, now standard for all V8 and the 6-cylinder Monaro GTS. The HG would be the final model for the generation and the last to use the original body shell.

=== Export program ===
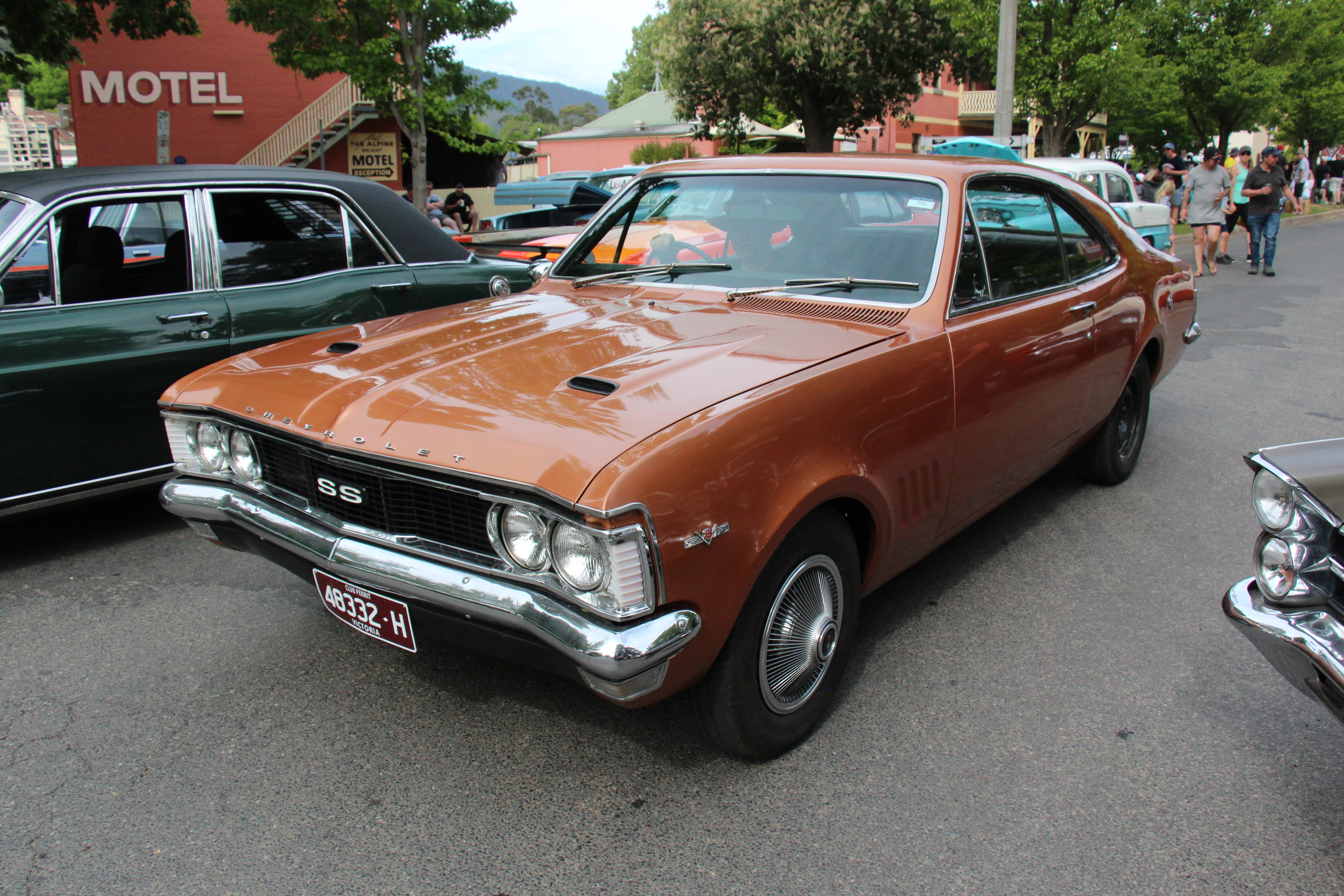
South African-built 1971–1973 Chevrolet SS (HG)

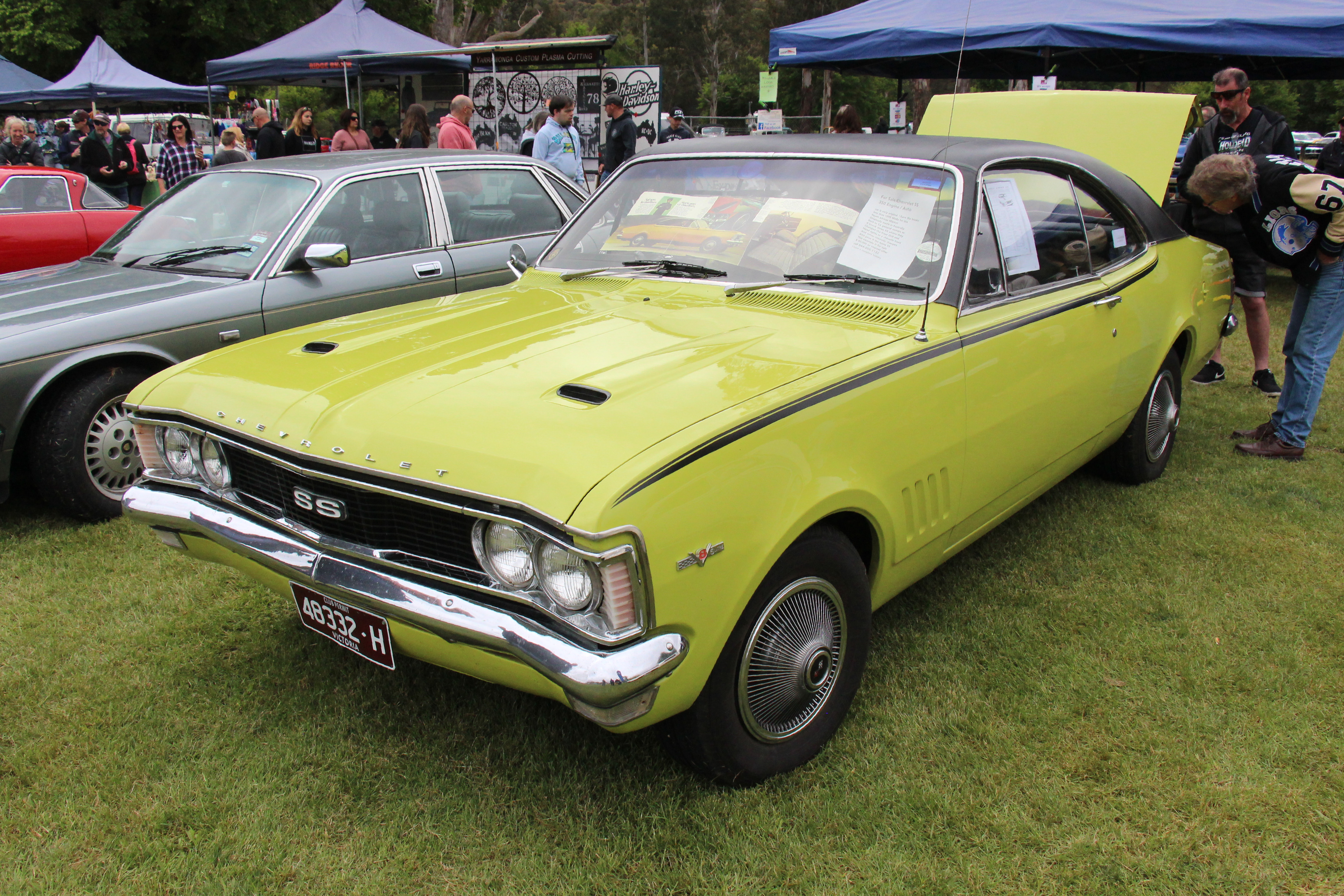
1971 Chevrolet SS (HG)

In 1970 HT Holden Monaro GTS coupes started being assembled in South Africa from imported parts by General Motors South Africa (GMSA) at the Port Elizabeth assembly plant. In 1971 the later HG series Monaro was assembled and sold in South Africa badged as the Chevrolet SS until 1973, long after the HQ series had been released. At this time GMSA had made a decision to market most of its products as Chevrolets. The Chevrolet SS had revised front styling unique to that model, incorporating four headlights and large turn indicators in the front edge of the fenders above the bumper. The Holden Monaro and Chevrolet SS models were both available with Holden 308 in^{3} (5.0L) and the Chevrolet 350 in^{3} (5.7 L) engines. South African sales totalled 1,828 Monaros and 1,182 SS models.

== Second generation (1971–1979) ==
Second generation
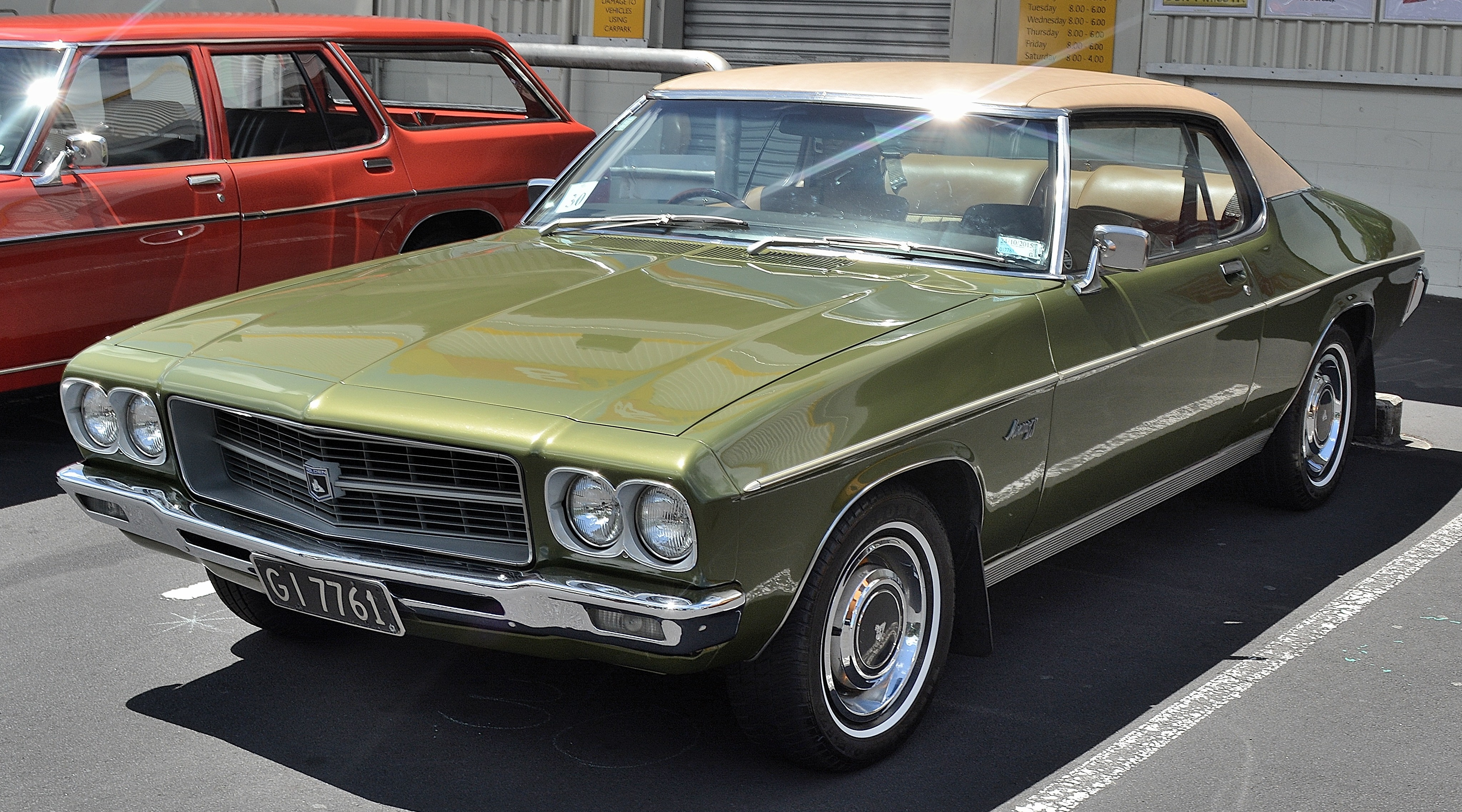
- 1971–1974 Holden Monaro (HQ) LS

Overview
- Production: 1971–1979
- Assembly: Australia: Adelaide, South Australia (Elizabeth), Brisbane, Queensland (Acacia Ridge), Melbourne (Pagewood)
- Designer: Phillip Zmood

Powertrain
- Engine: 2.8 L (173 cu in) Holden Red I6 (base); 3.3 L (202 cu in) Holden Red I6; 4.1 L (253 cu in) Holden V8; 5.0 L (308 cu in) Holden V8 (GTS); 5.7 L (350 cu in) GM 350 V8 (GTS350)
- Transmission: 3-speed ‘Tri-Matic’ automatic; 3-speed ‘TH400’ automatic (only with 350V8); 4-speed manual

=== HQ ===
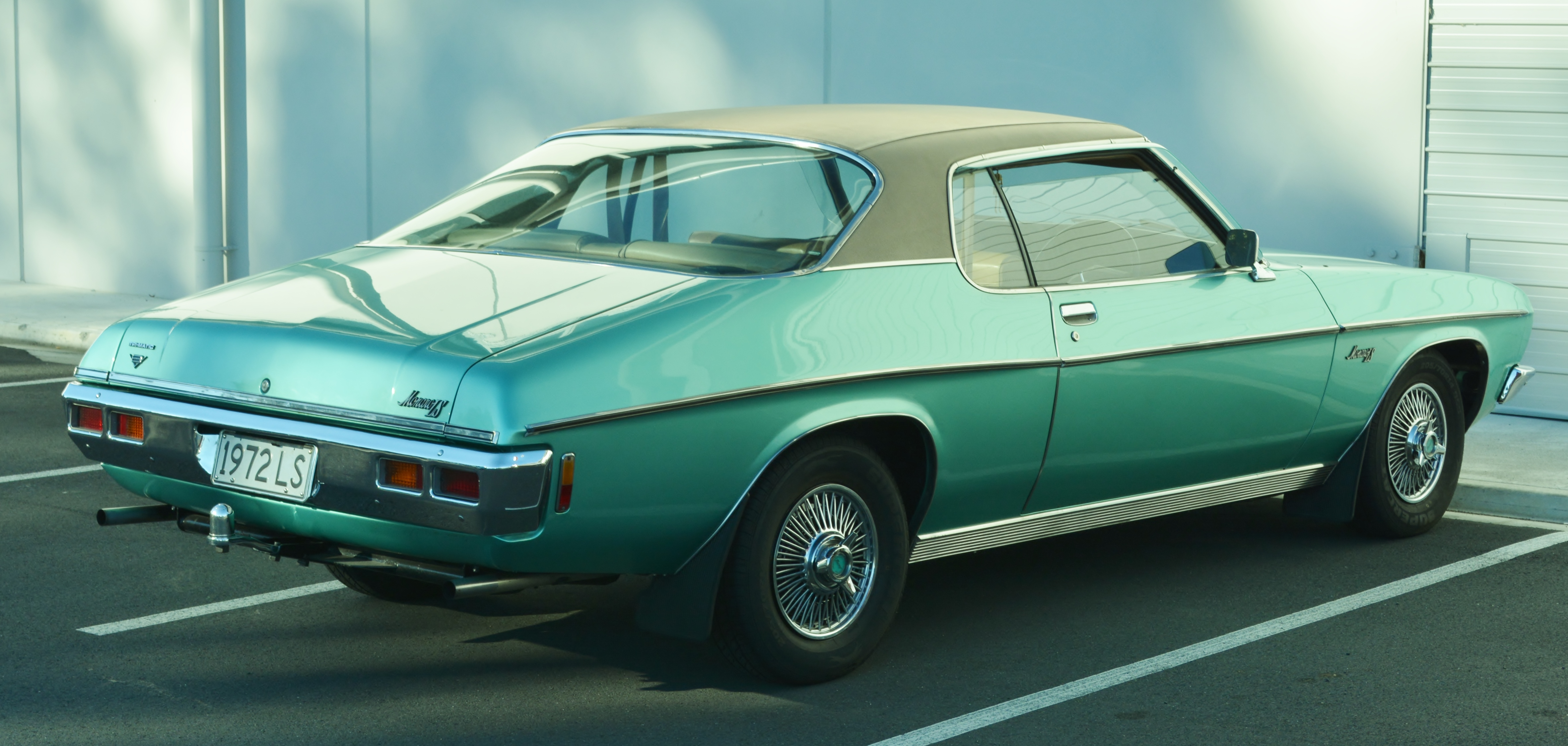
1971–1974 Holden Monaro LS coupe (HQ)

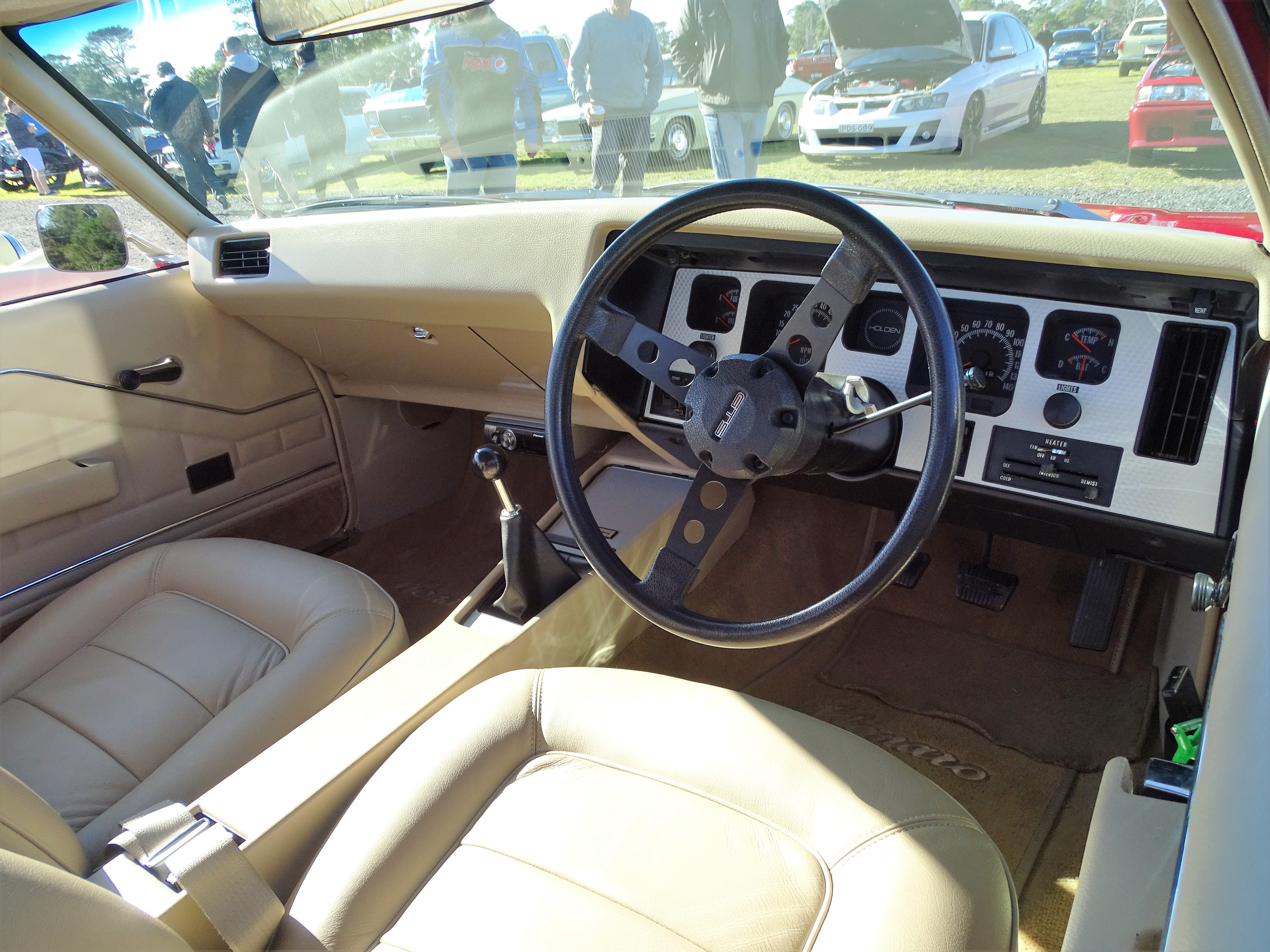
Interior (GTS)

A completely new body design emerged with the HQ series in July 1971, including the new Monaro 'LS' (commonly believed to mean "Luxury Sports") model which featured four headlights and chrome trim rings shared with the Holden Premier sedan. There were no longer any six-cylinder versions of the Monaro GTS, just the locally manufactured 4.15 L (253 cu in) or optional 5.0 L (308 cu in) V8s or the top level GTS350 coupé, equipped with an imported 5.7 L (350 cu in) Chevrolet motor.

The base model Monaro standard engine was enlarged to 173 in^{3} (2,830 cc) whilst the Monaro LS had a broad spectrum of engine options from a 202 in^{3} (3,310 cc) six to the 350 in^{3} (5,700 cc) V8. The new coupé design had a much larger rear window and a squarer rear quarter window; it was somehow seen as not as sporty looking compared to the earlier HK-HT-HG series, but is often now considered one of the best looking body designs to come from an Australian manufacturer. Taillights were now rectangular in dual-unit style, integrated into the rear bumper; they were not unlike those of the American 1969 Chevrolet Bel Air/Biscayne. The car's styling was somewhat reminiscent of the 1970-72 Chevrolet Chevelle.

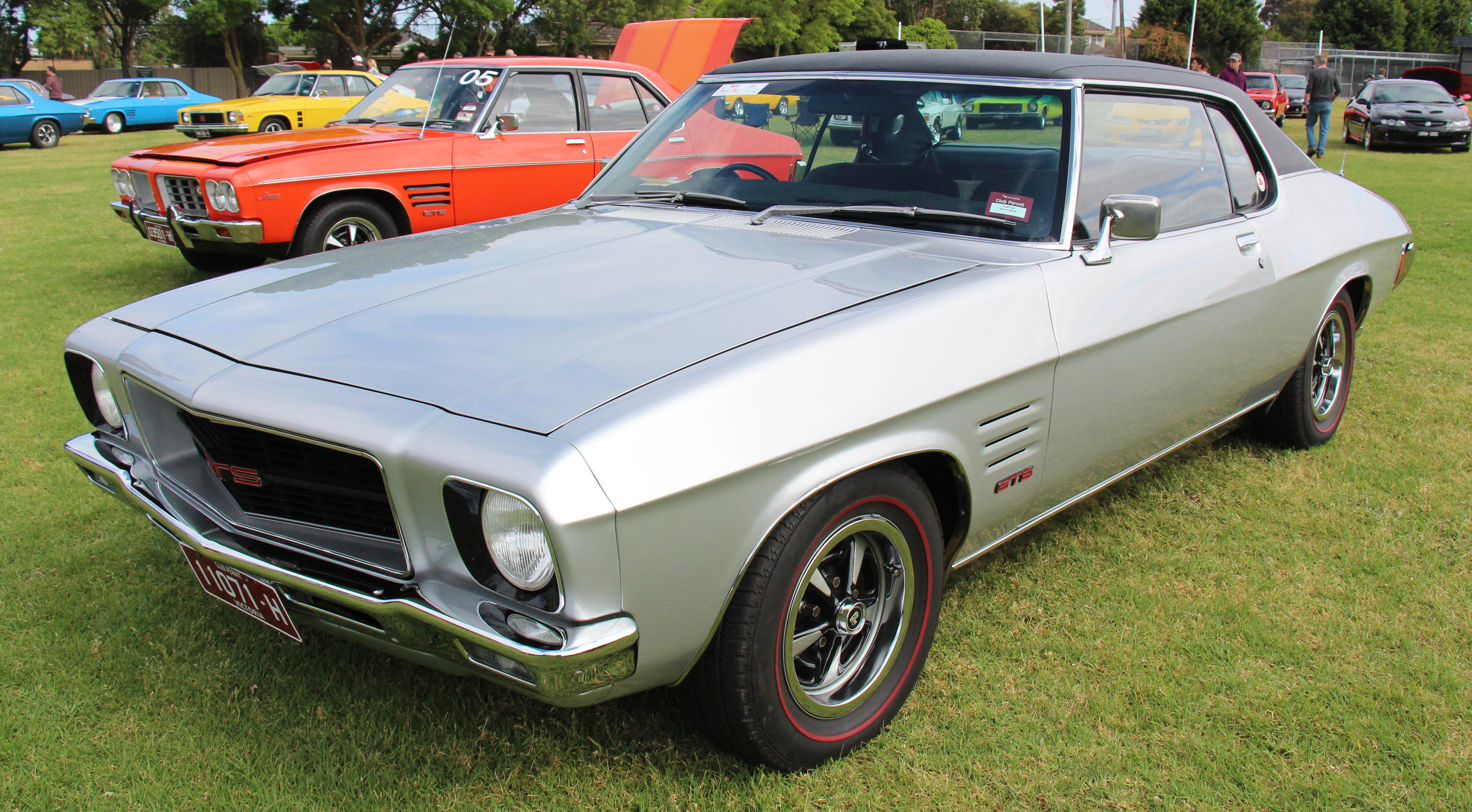
1971–1974 Holden Monaro GTS coupe (HQ)

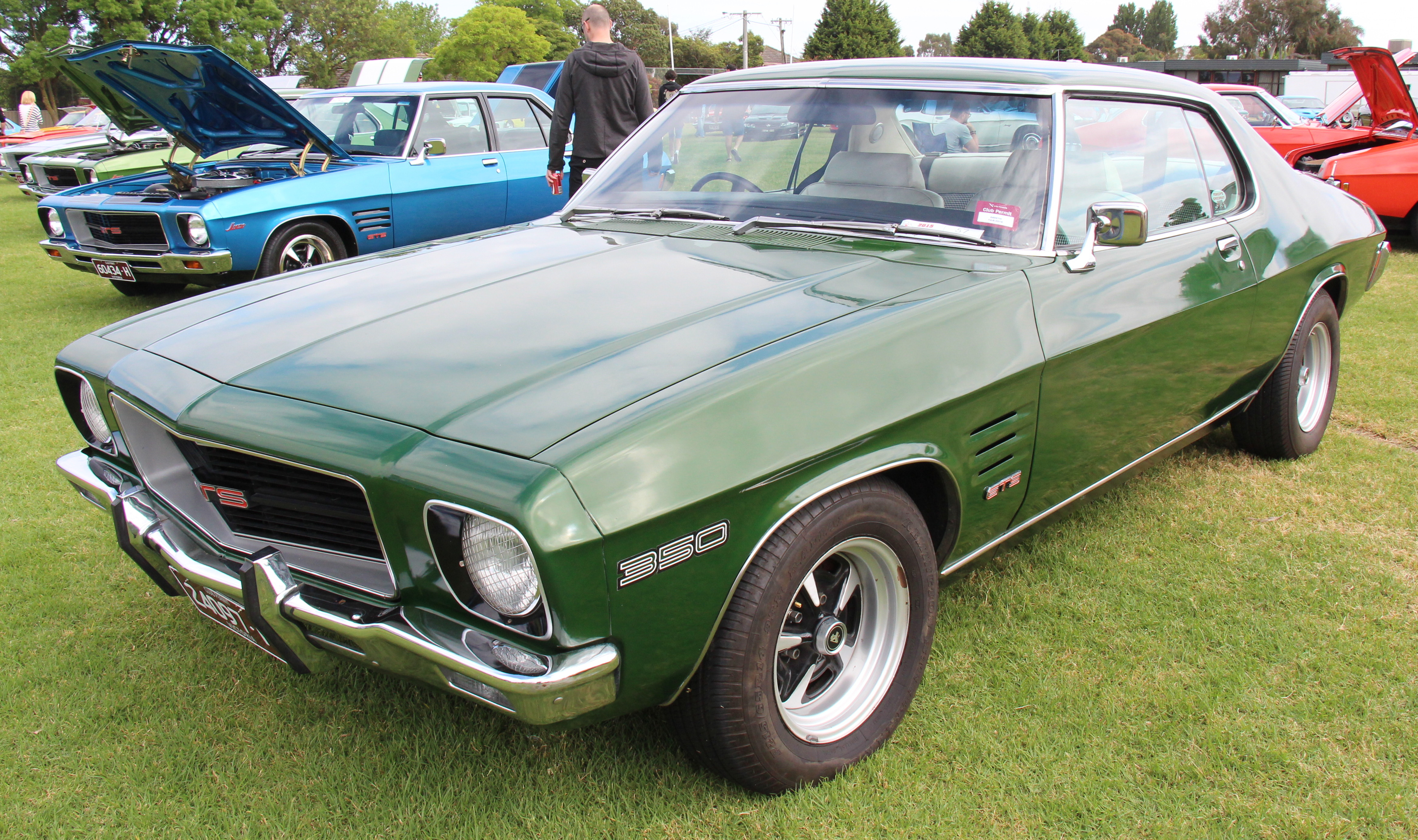
1971–1974 Holden Monaro GTS 350 coupe (HQ)

Until 1973, the HQ Monaro GTS did not have any exterior graphics and the 5.7 L (350 cu in) L48 Chevy V8 was a little less potent than in previous HT/HG versions rated at 205 kW (279 PS; 275 hp) at 4,800 rpm and 488 N⋅m (360 lb⋅ft) of torque at 3,200 rpm, especially with the optional Turbo-hydramatic 400, 3-speed automatic transmission. This and the fact that the same 350 engine was also available as on option in the large Statesman luxury sedan, probably contributed to a downgrade of the Monaro GTS range in muscular image terms, as did the replacement of the bigger coupés with the inline-six engine Holden Torana GTR XU-1 as the chosen GM car for Australian touring car racing. The introduction of bonnet and bootlid paint-outs in 1973 coincided with the release of the HQ Monaro GTS in four-door sedan configuration. It is generally considered that Holden created the bold contrasting paint-outs so the new Monaro GTS sedan would not be mistaken for the Kingswood sedan upon which it was based.

The continued erosion of the GTS350 cachet was compounded by the deletion of specific "350" decals on the post-1973 cars, with all Monaro GTS coupés and sedans now being externally labelled with the generic HQ series 'V8' bootlid badge. In the final year of HQ production, i.e. 1974, the manual-transmission version of the GTS350 was discontinued and sales of the automatic version were minimal prior to the engine option being discontinued.

A 1972 model year two-door base Monaro was used in the film Mad Max as the MFP Pursuit Special driven by the Nightrider during the film's opening chase scene.

=== HJ ===
Introduced in October 1974, the HJ Monaro incorporated a heavy facelift and some model rationalisation. Its front end bore a resemblance to the 1970–1972 Chevrolet Monte Carlo. The 350 V8 engine option and the base Monaro coupé were both discontinued. The Monaro GTS continued to be available as a coupé or sedan with the 253 in^{3} (4.15 L; 4,150 cc) V8 engine, or the optional 308 in^{3} (5,050 cc) V8 engine. The Monaro LS coupé also continued within the range, but still with the 3.3-litre six-cylinder engine as its base power unit.

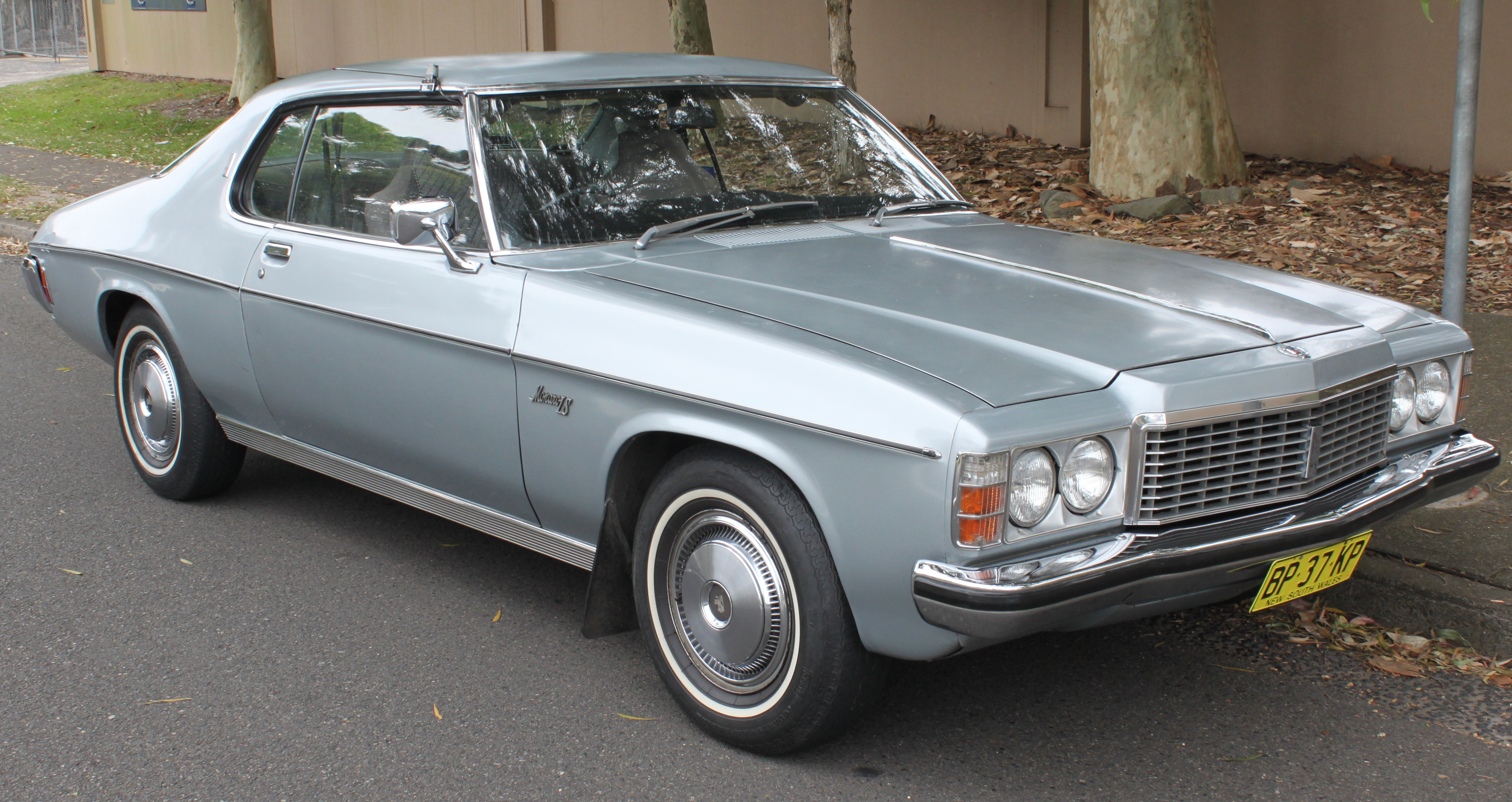
1974–1976 Holden Monaro LS coupe (HJ)

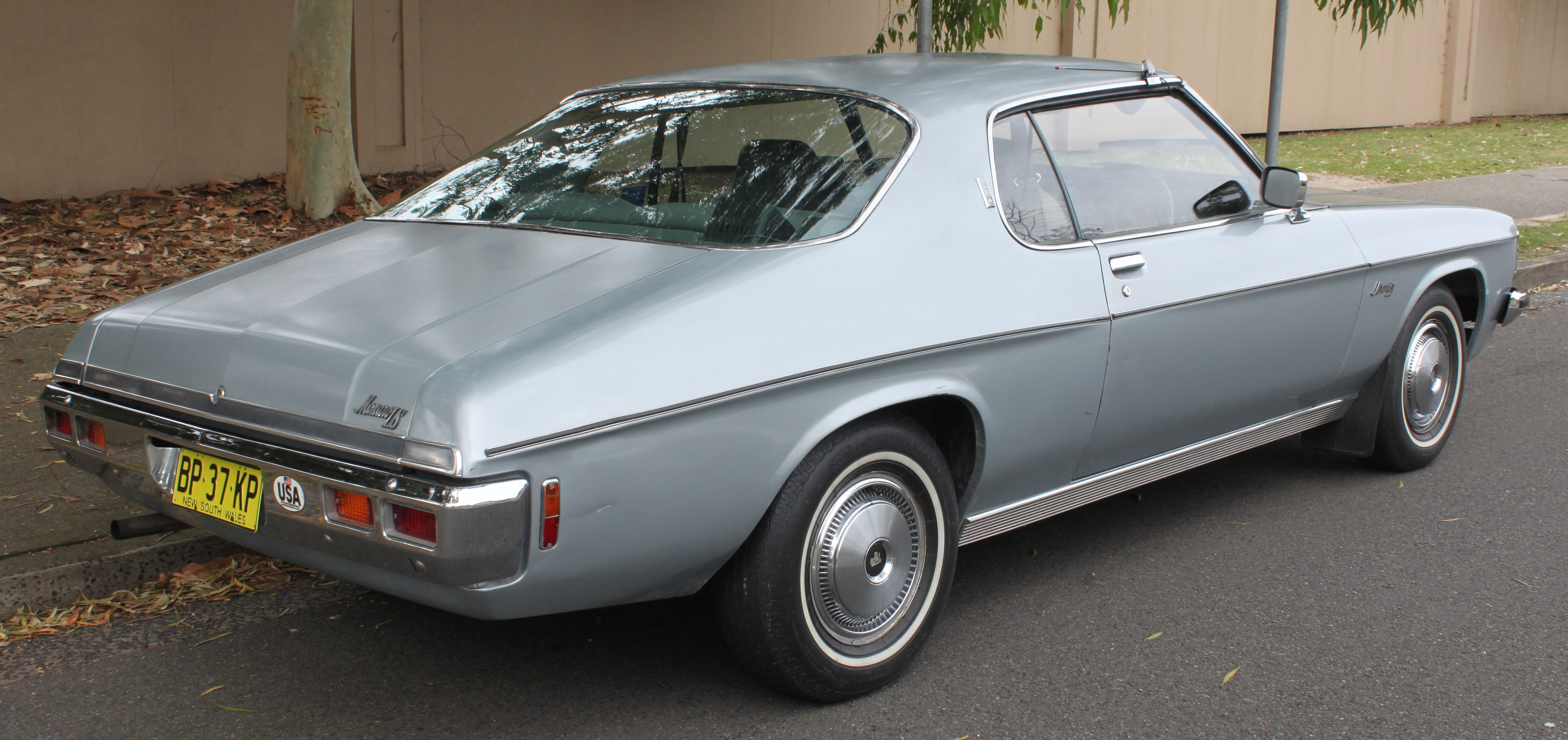
1974–1976 Holden Monaro LS coupe (HJ)

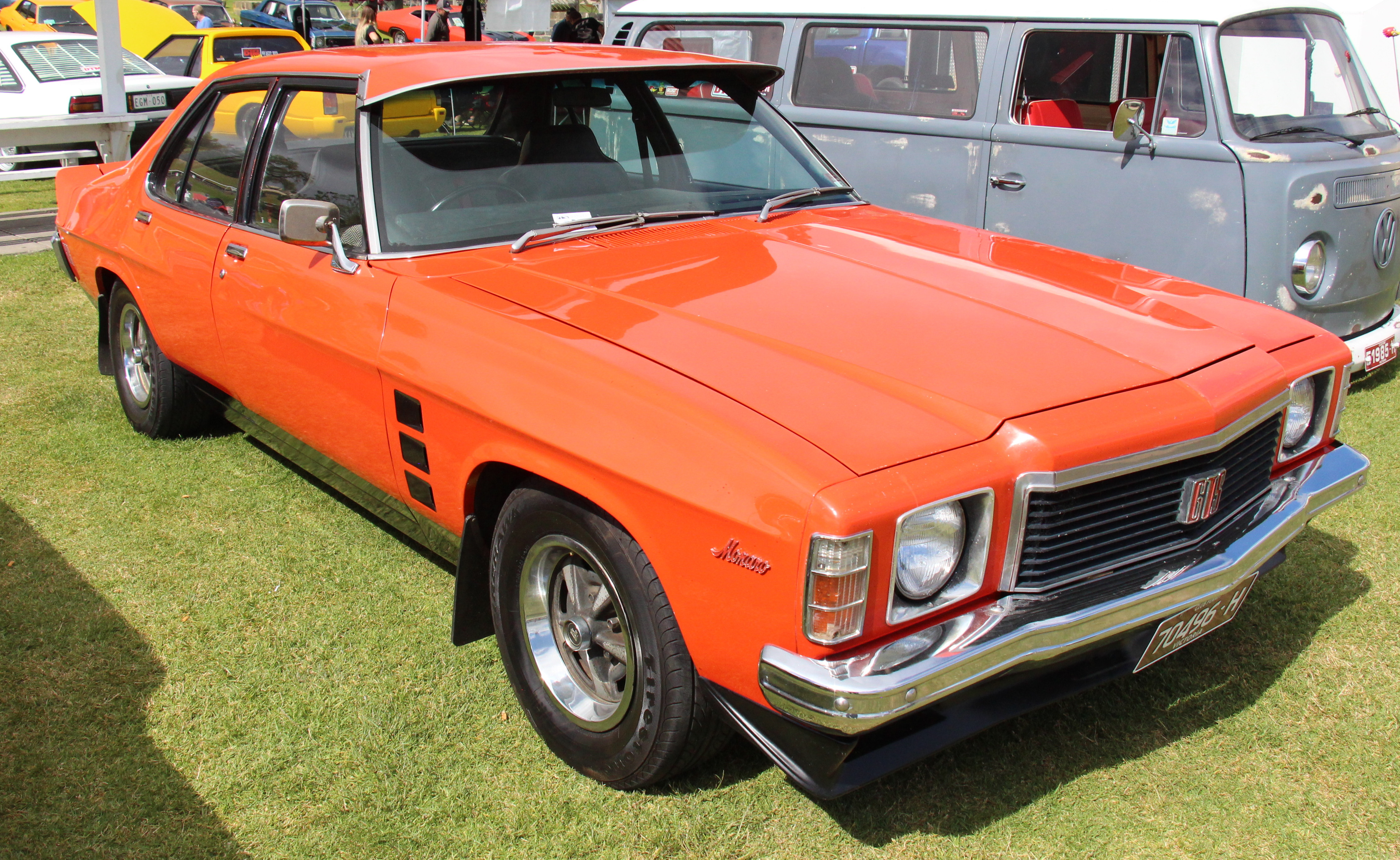
1974–1976 Holden Monaro GTS sedan (HJ)

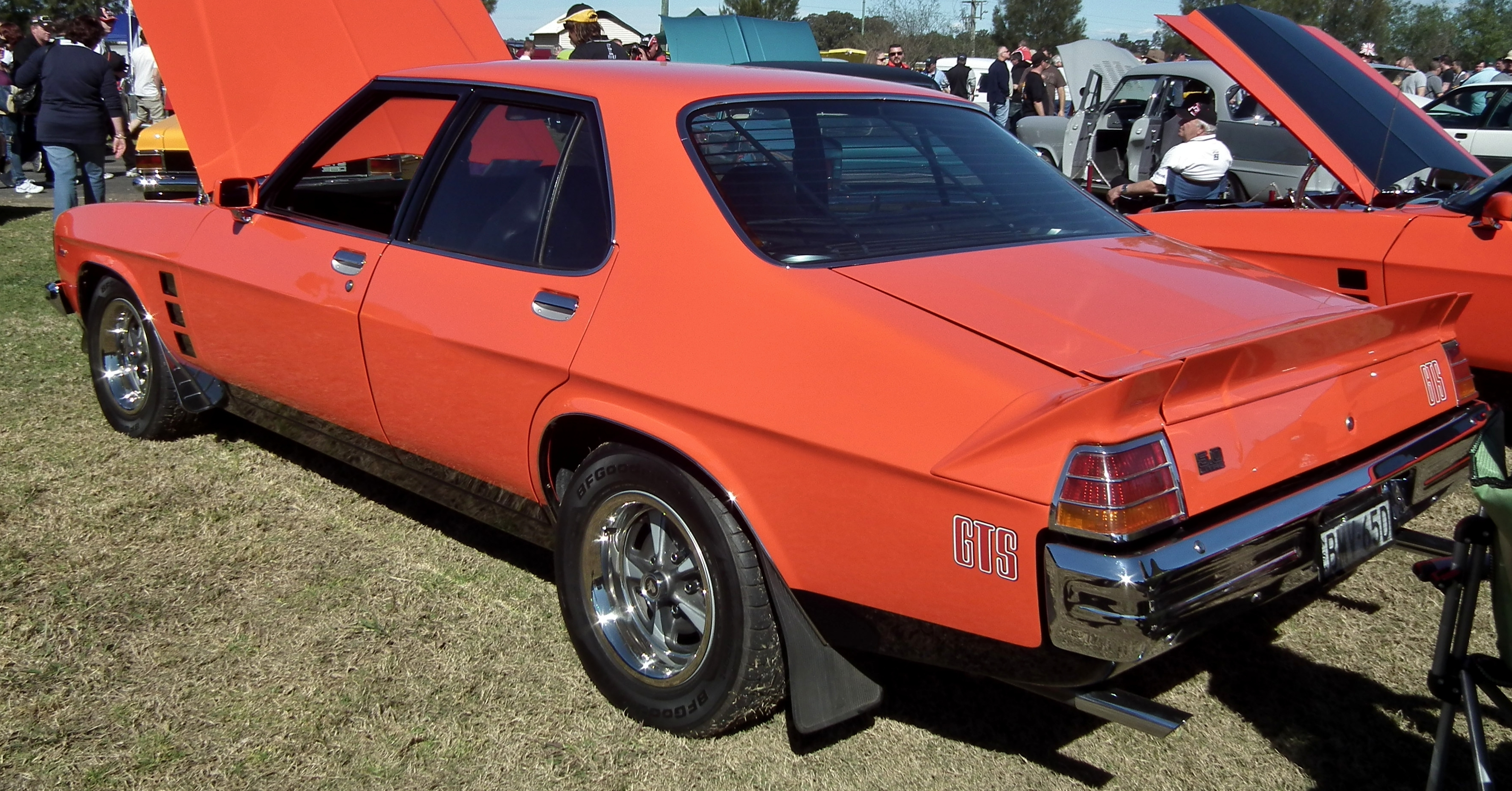
1974–1976 Holden Monaro GTS sedan (HJ)

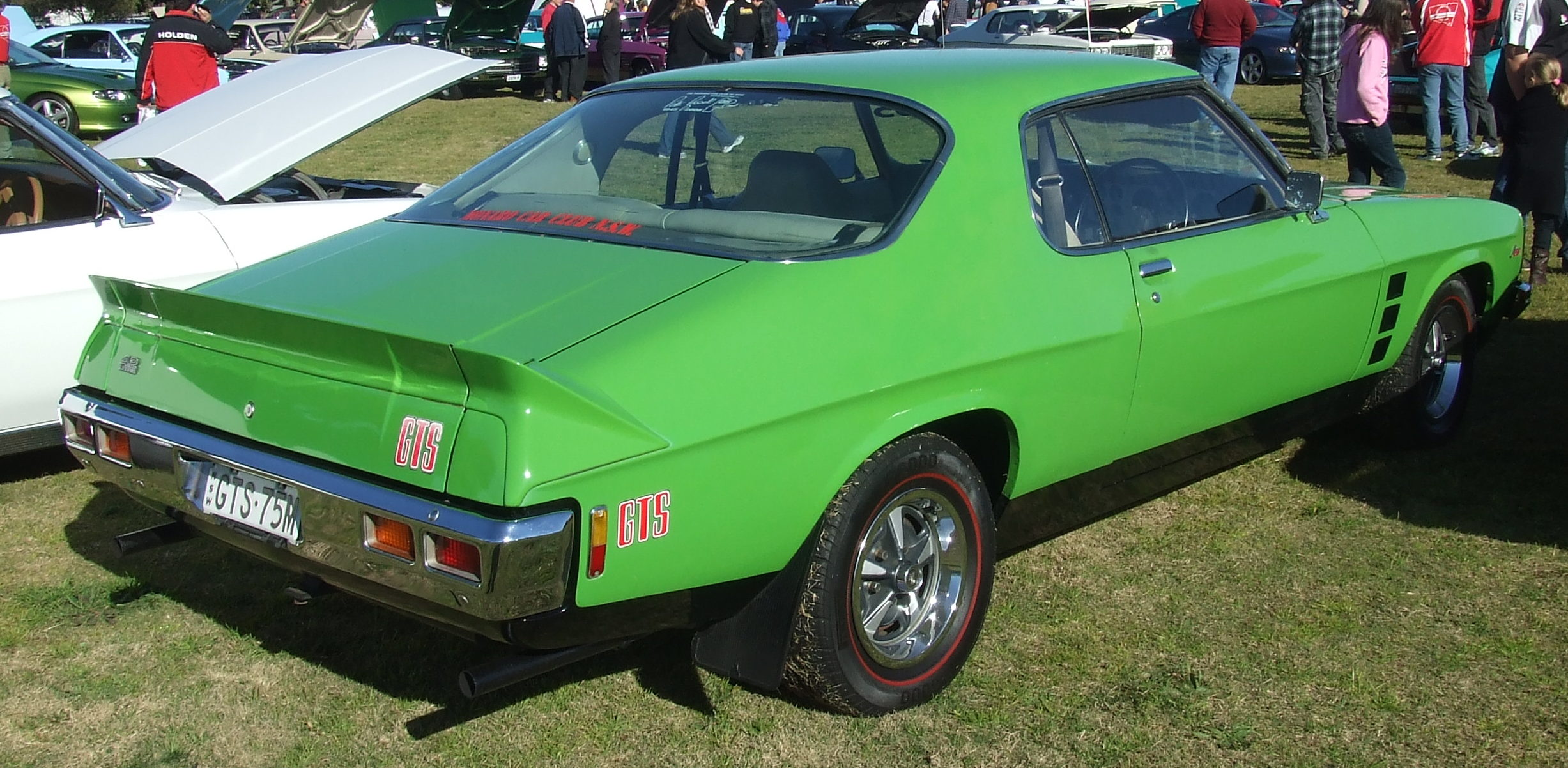
1974–1976 Holden Monaro GTS coupe (HJ)

The body paint-outs were discontinued in the HJ Monaro GTS range, but for the first time, the Monaro could be specified with optional front and rear spoilers.

The HJ Monaro LS coupé is close to being the rarest regular production car ever made in Australia with only 337 units produced. The HJ Monaro GTS coupé was discontinued during 1976 due to falling demand, 606 examples of the GTS were made.

=== HX ===
New emissions regulations heralded the mildly facelifted HX Monaro GTS sedan, announced in July 1976. The HX was quite distinguishable, with liberal splashes of black paintouts contrasted against a range of bold body colours, and a choice of traditional chrome or body painted bumper bars.

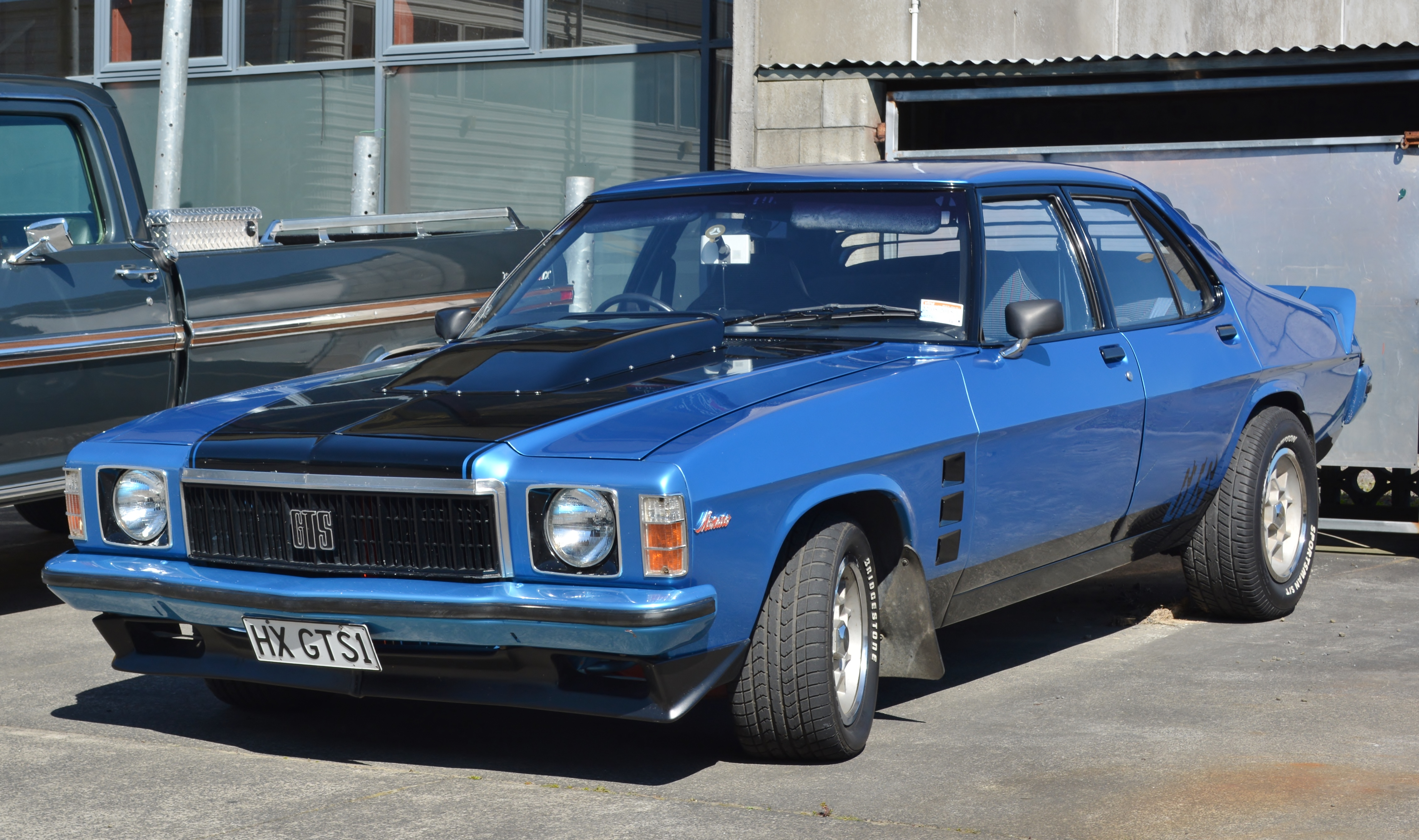
1976–1977 Holden Monaro GTS sedan (HX)

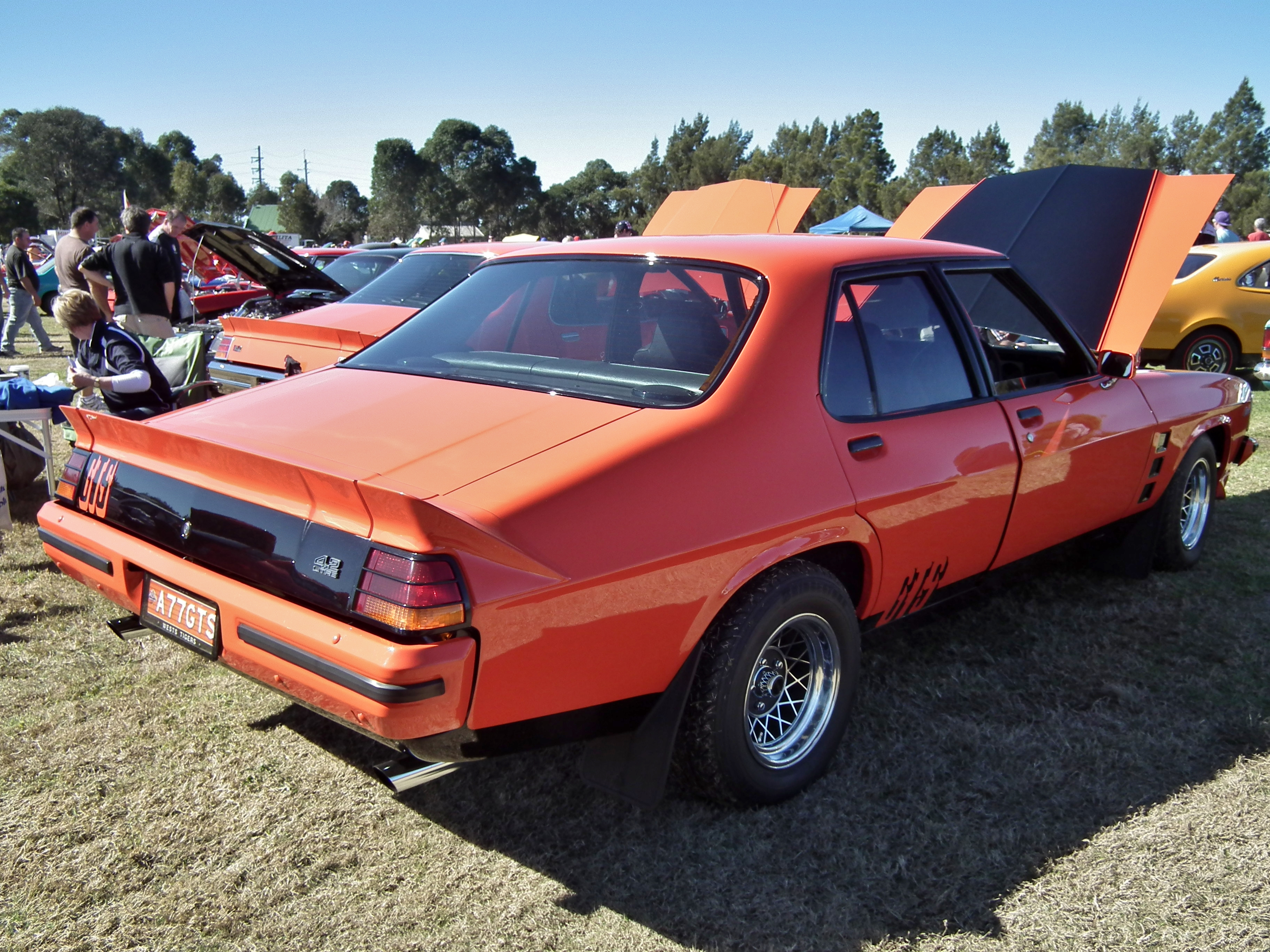
Rear view

Limited Edition

Holden had a limited number of HJ coupe panel sets in 1975 and a decision was made to do something special with them. The solution was to create the Limited Edition, or LE, which was not released until 27 September 1976. More than 600 body shells were assembled at the Pagewood body plant as HJ bodies in white late in 1975, but due to delays, the HX series came around before LE production begun, thus mandating the cars to be converted to HX which meant body shell changes. Some of those bodies were utilised to build HJ coupes prior to the cessation of HJ coupe production in early 1976 before the release HX series in mid 1976. of the All LE cars were painted in an exclusive metallic colour called LE Red. The LE is commonly referred to as a Monaro LE but the LE is a separate car from the official Monaro line up. The LE was an amalgam of prestige and surplus parts (including an eight-track cartridge player well after cassette tapes were common), in effect a combination of Monaro GTS and Statesman Caprice components. The LE had a price tag to match: AUD$11,500. The cars were built at the now-defunct Pagewood (Sydney) plant. Production totalled 580 cars. The distinctive US sourced honeycomb wheels fitted to the LE, which resembled those of the second generation Pontiac Firebird, were created by a plastic mould adhered to the outside of conventional steel wheel rims. These were a gold painted version of the same wheel that had been available as an option on passenger vehicles since early in the HJ series. The front end styling of this pillarless hardtop resembles a smaller-scale 1971 U.S. specification Chevrolet Caprice.

The Holden Limited Edition was not marketed as a Monaro.

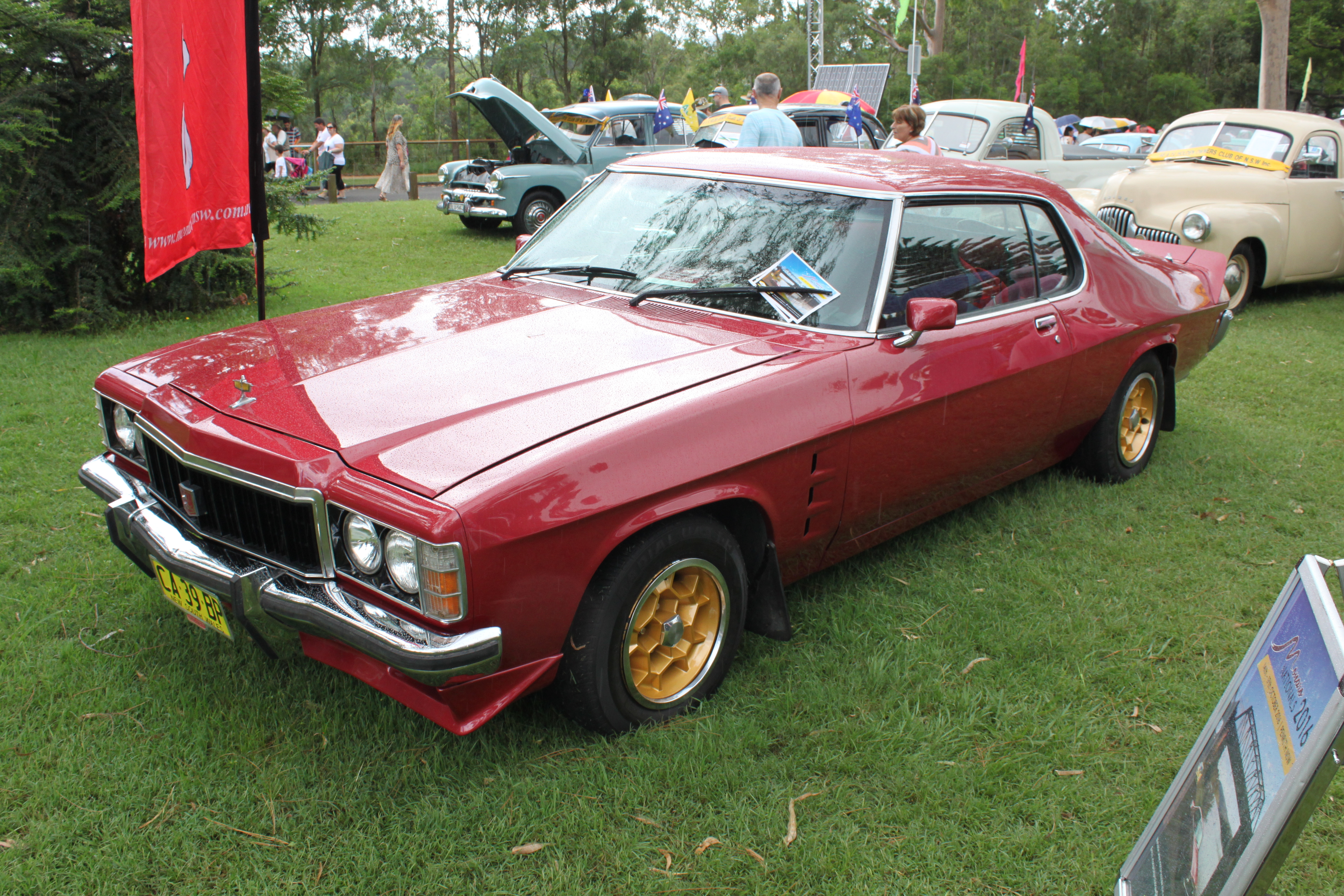
1976–1977 Holden Limited Edition (HX)

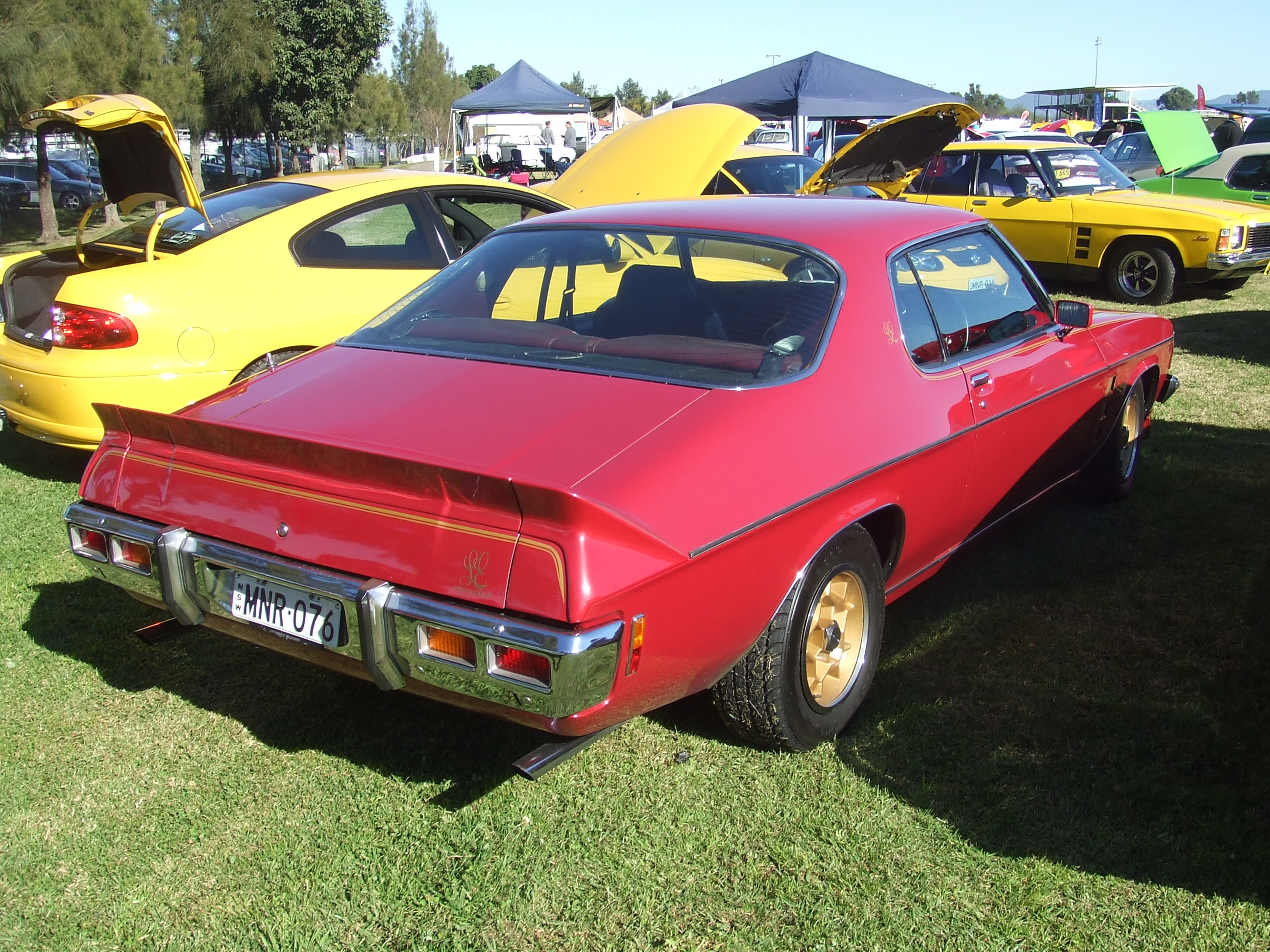
Rear view

=== HZ ===
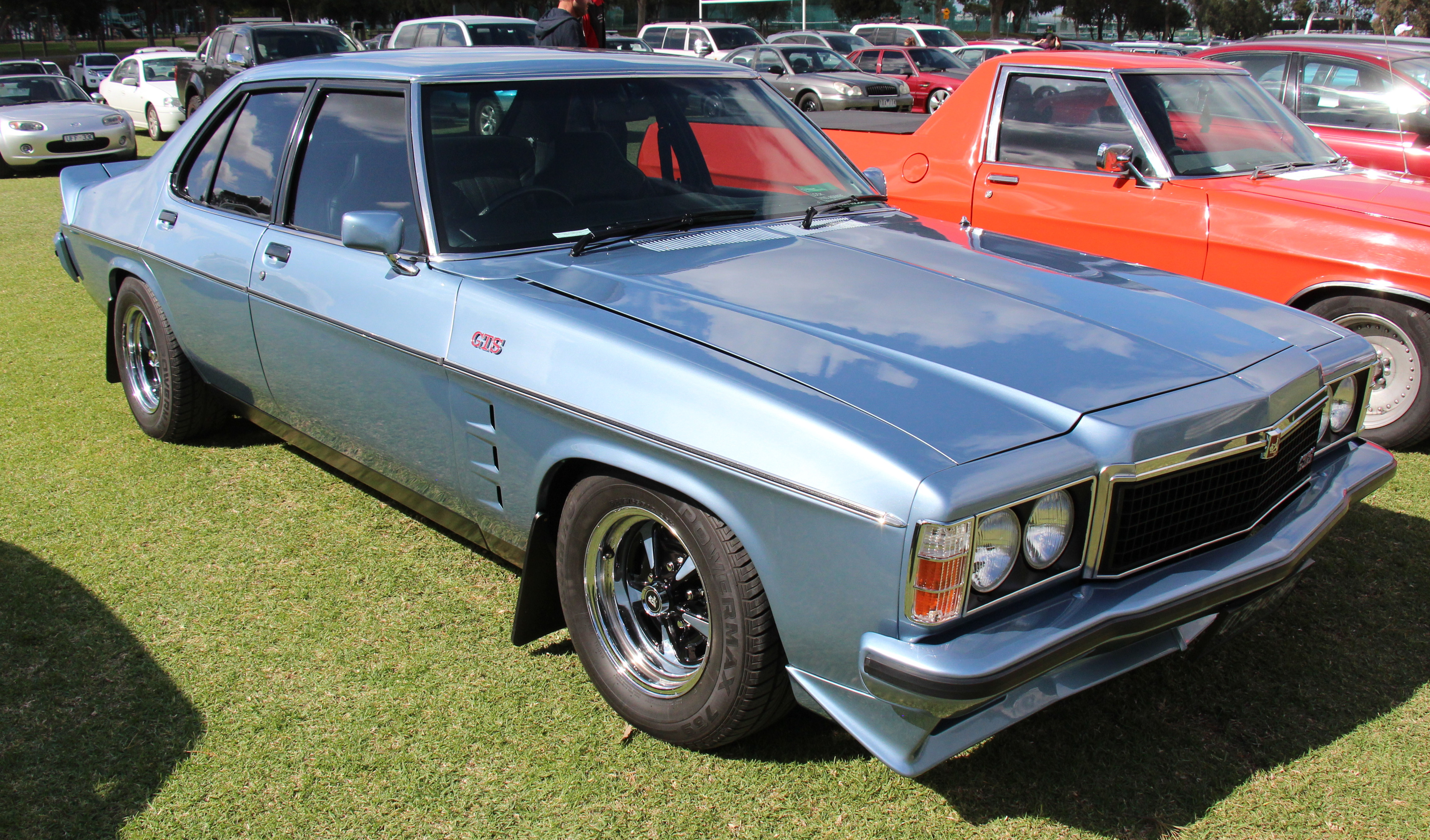
1977–1979 Holden GTS (HZ)

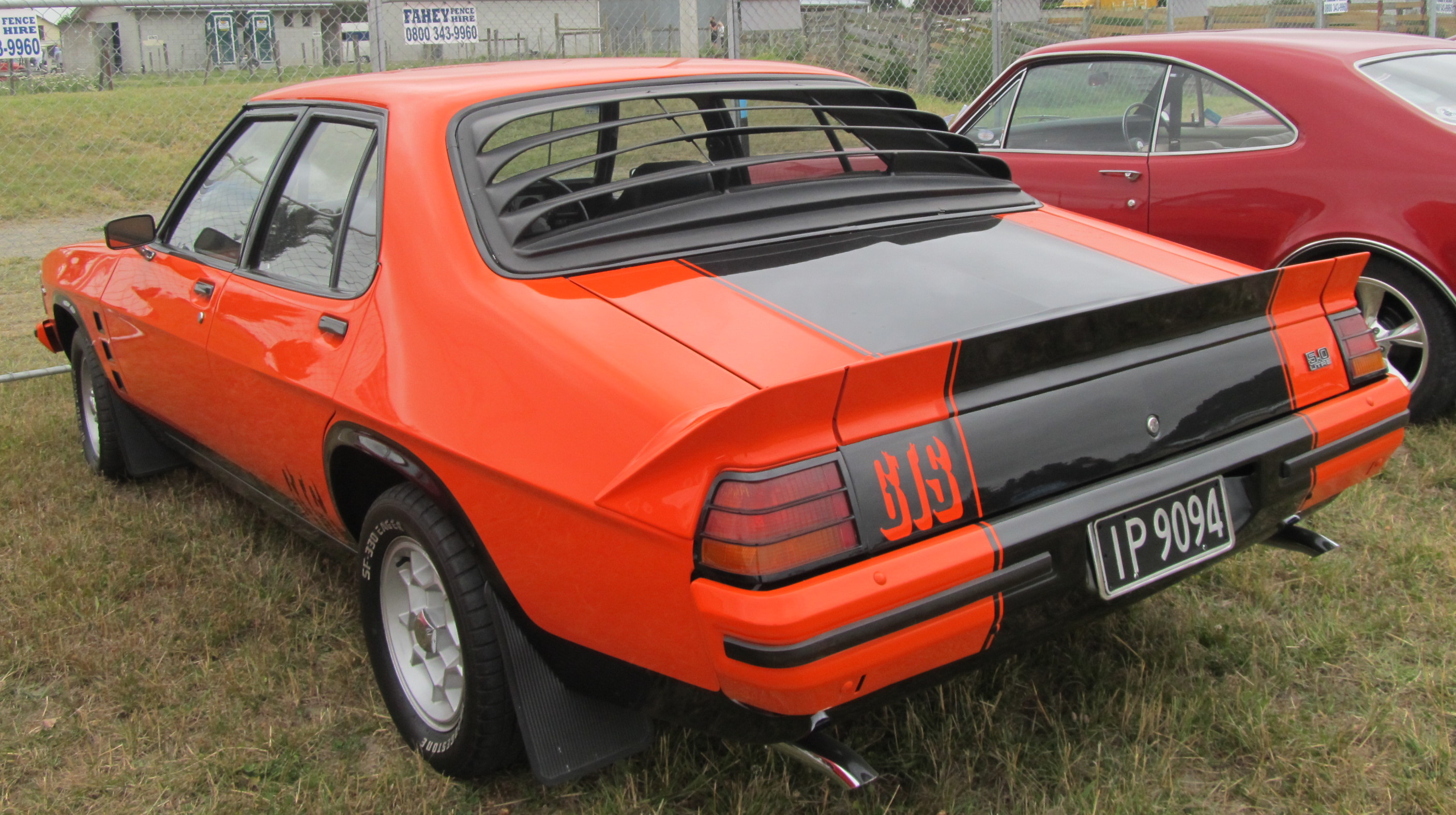
1977–1979 Holden GTS (HZ)

For the new Holden HZ range General Motors decided to delete the Monaro name altogether and shortened the name to Holden GTS. However the Holden HZ GTS sedan is commonly and unofficially referred to as a Monaro. With the development of Radial Tuned Suspension handling had significantly improved since previous models. Released on 5 October 1977, this HZ variant featured a four headlight grille, front and rear air dams, four-wheel disc brakes, sports wheels and a 4.2-litre V8 engine as standard equipment. The optional 5.0-litre V8 became standard in June 1978. With the October 1978 introduction of the new mid/full-size Commodore VB sedan and its availability with V8 engine, the days of the GTS appeared numbered. Production of the GTS ceased in January 1979, an estimated 1,438 were built.

Ultimately, the VB Commodore proved very popular in both six-cylinder and V8 forms, such that all full-size HZ Holden passenger cars were phased out of production in 1980. Remnants of the H-series lived on in the Holden WB series commercial vehicle range and in the revamped Statesman WB luxury sedans that were manufactured until January 1985.

== Third generation (2001–2006) ==
Third generation
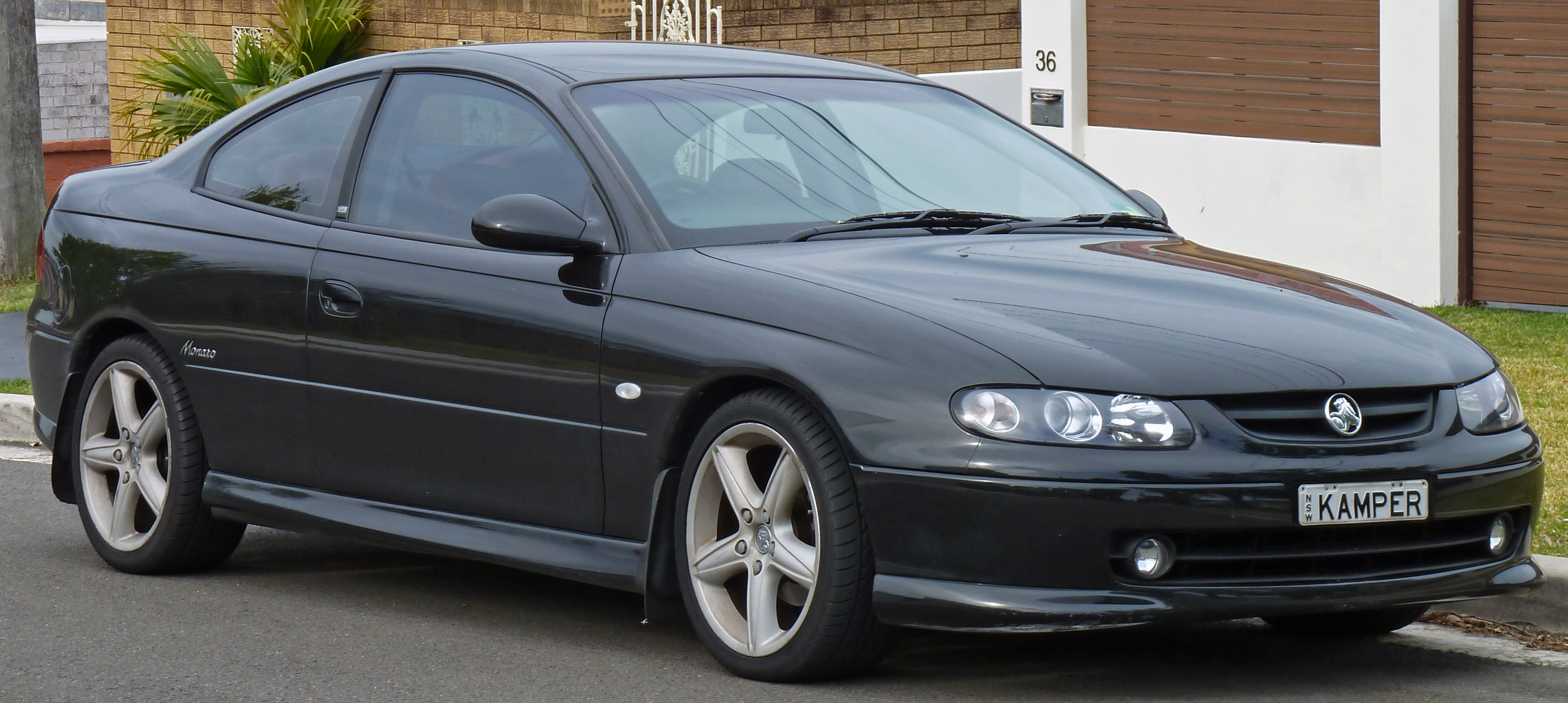
- 2001–2003 Holden Monaro (V2) (VX) CV8

Overview
- Also called: HSV Coupé; Chevrolet Lumina Coupé; Pontiac GTO; Vauxhall Monaro
- Production: November 2001 – February 2006
- Model years: 2002–2006
- Assembly: Australia: Adelaide, South Australia (Elizabeth)
- Designer: Mike Simcoe (1998)

Body and chassis
- Related: Holden Commodore (VX); CSV Mondo; Bitter CD II

Powertrain
- Engine: Petrol: 3.8 L Supercharged Ecotec L67 V6 (CV6); 5.7 L GM LS1 V8 (CV8); 6.0 GM LS2 V8
- Power output: 171 kW (229 hp) (CV6); 225 kW (302 hp) (V2 Series I CV8); 235 kW (315 hp) (V2 Series II CV8); 245 kW (329 hp) (V2 Series III CV8); 260 kW (349 hp) (VZ Series CV8)
- Transmission: 6-speed T-56 manual; 4-speed 4L60E automatic

After 25 years of absence of a full-size Holden coupe, the Monaro made a return in November 2001 following the overwhelming response of the public and media to the VT Commodore-based Holden Coupé concept displayed at the 1998 Australian International Motor Show held in Sydney. The third generation of the Monaro was produced from 2001 to 2006.

=== V2 ===
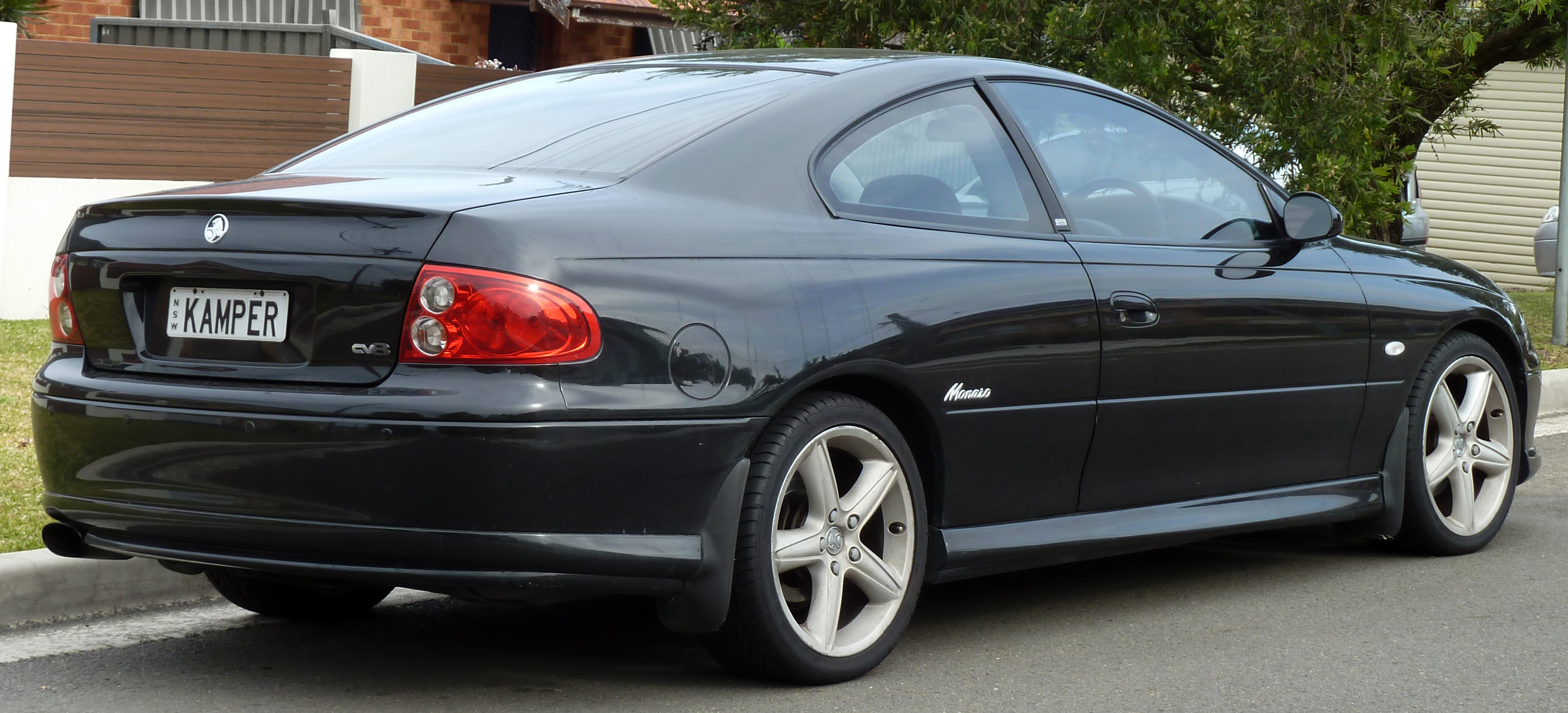
2001–2003 Holden Monaro (V2)(VX) CV8 coupe

After a development period of 22 months (contrary to the planned 12 to 18 months) and at a cost of A$60 million, Holden launched the V2-series Monaro based on the VX-series Commodore. It was available as the CV6, with a 3.8 L Supercharged Ecotec L67 V6 and 4-speed automatic transmission (production ceased in August 2004 along with the Holden and HSV models based on the VY series 2 Commodore), along with the CV8, featuring the 5.7 L LS1 V8, with a choice of either a 6-speed manual or 4-speed automatic transmission. A Series 2 model debuted in January 2003 with a revised dashboard from the brand new VY-series Commodore, a new alloy road wheel design and new paint and trim colour choices. The CV6 model was dropped after disappointing sales (reputedly 10 times as many CV8s were built compared to CV6s) when the VY Series 2 based V2 Series 3 model appeared in 2004.

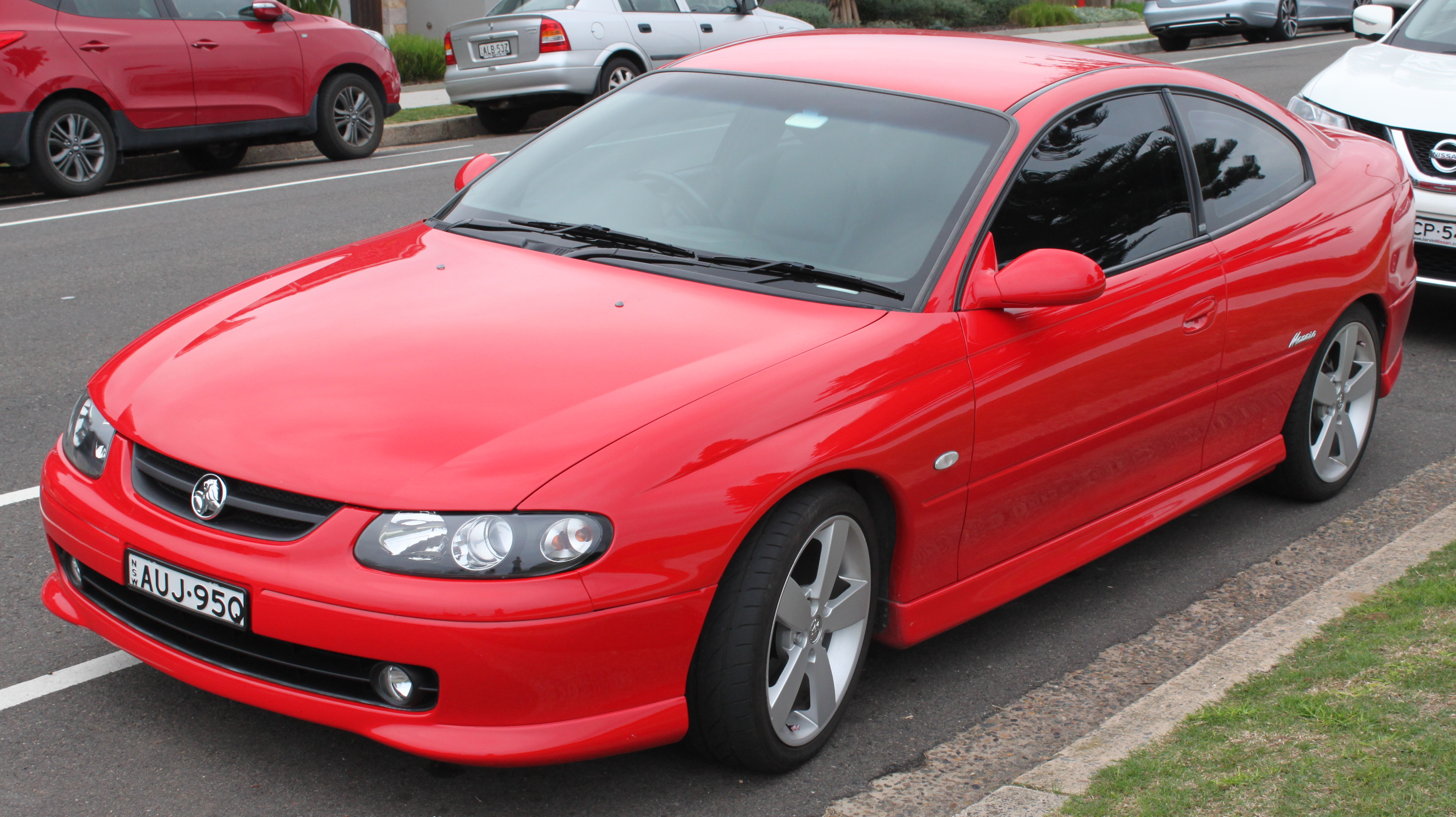

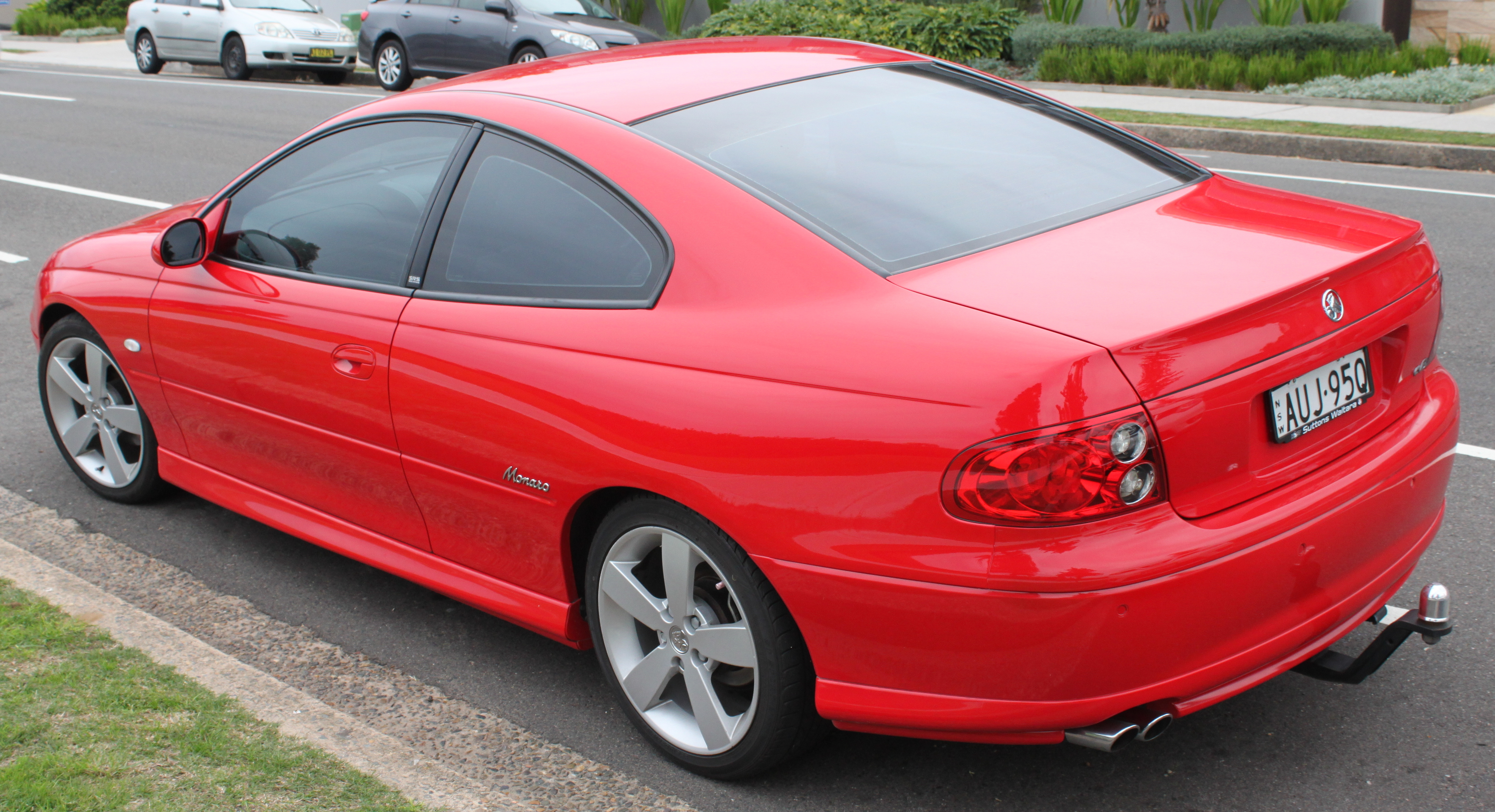
2004 Holden Monaro CV8 coupe (V2 III) (VYII)

A limited-edition model called the CV8-R was introduced in July 2003, all 350 of which were made in Turbine Mica (grey metallic) paint colour. A revised CV8-R model would appear again in May 2004 (based on the Series 3 CV8), all 320 of which were made in an exclusive Pulse Red paint colour. Other unique features of the 2004 CV8-R cars included 18" five-spoke machined face alloy wheels, smoked front and rear lamp treatment, and a “Holden By Design” electric sunroof. The interior featured the centre fascia and instrument surrounds in satin finish, “Pulse Red” and black floor-mats with CV8-R logo, a unique instrument cluster with white dial-plate daytime illumination, and leather trimming for the steering wheel, handbrake and transmission selectors (matching anthracite leather was used for the sports seats and door trims, with perforated leather inserts and black stitching).

=== VZ ===
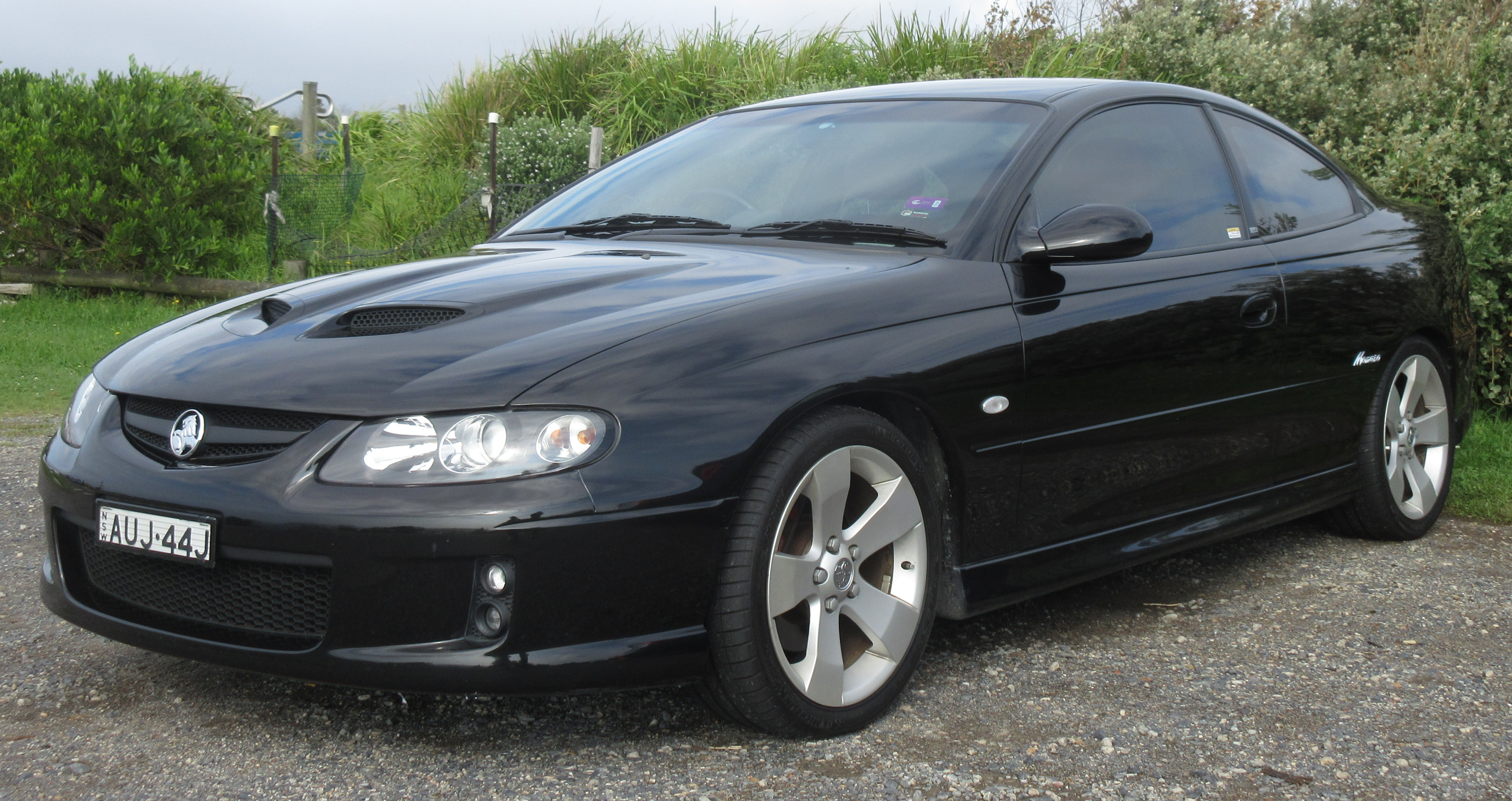

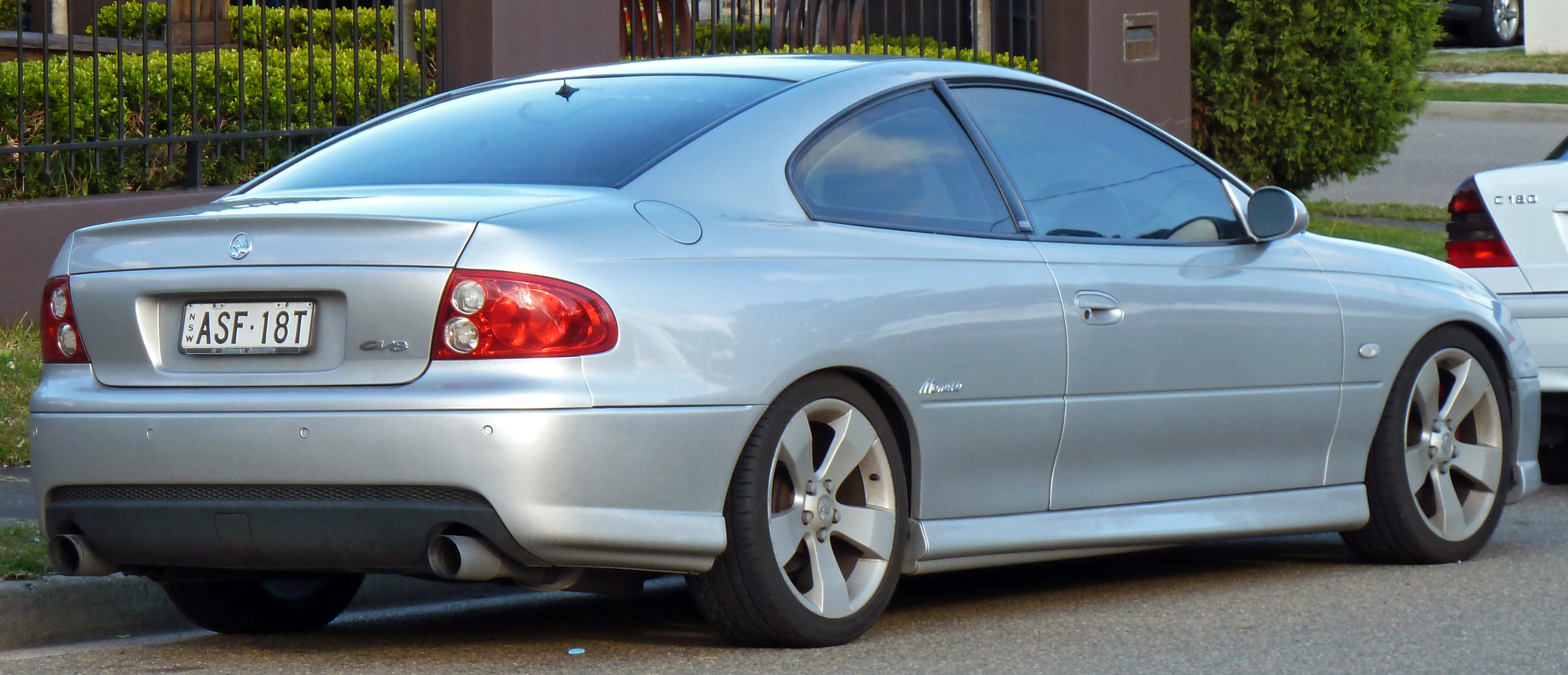
2004–2006 Holden Monaro CV8 coupe (VZ)

On 12 September 2004, Holden introduced the VZ Monaro CV8 with a 15 kW increase in engine power when compared to the previous V2-series cars. The VZ series at first came in only four paint colours (Phantom, Devil, Turismo and Quicksilver) and later saw the addition of a fifth colour named Fusion, seen only in the closing of production CV8-Z model. The VZ Monaro CV8 was upgraded in other ways too, receiving a 10-speaker audio system with two built-in subwoofers, new front/rear bumper assemblies, dual exhaust system and various other small changes. The revised rear bumper, dual exhaust system, and new hood with air intakes would soon find their way onto the export Pontiac GTO. However, in July 2005, Holden announced that production of the current generation VZ Monaro CV8 would soon be coming to an end by the start of 2006 and this led to the run of a special edition model called the CV8-Z, of which 1,605 units were ultimately made.

The last Holden Monaro-badged coupé was purchased by Emerald, Queensland businessman Darryl Mattingley for A$187,355.55—around three times the normal retail price, on 19 February 2006. The car was bought through eBay, with the proceeds going to the Leukaemia Foundation.

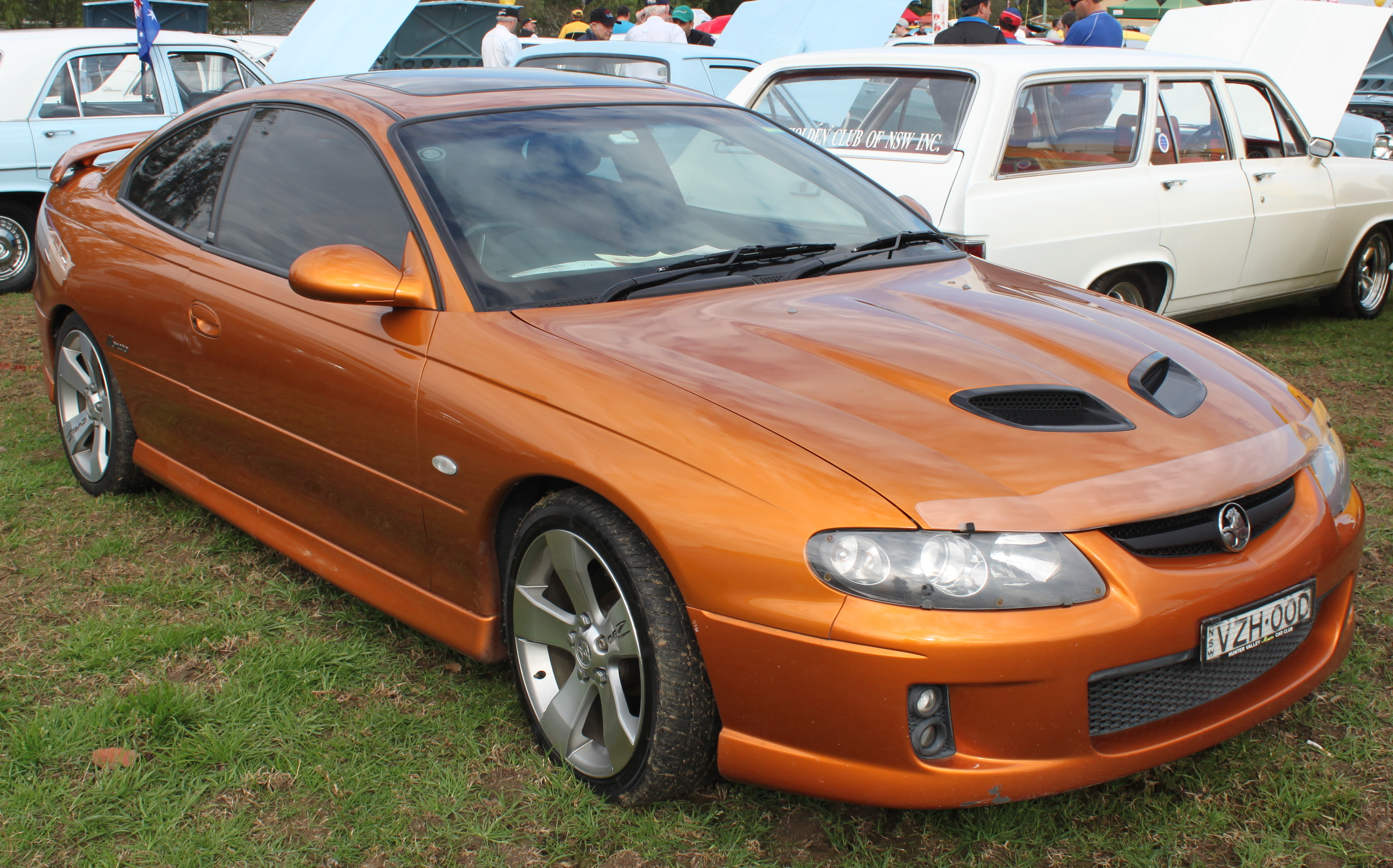
2005-2006 Holden Monaro CV8-Z in colour "Fusion"

The Holden Monaro CV8-Z was produced to farewell the legendary Monaro name, much like what had been done with the LE coupé back in 1976 and 1977. Wheels magazine tested a CV8-Z in the March 2006 issue with a Ford Mustang GT and a Nissan 350Z. They summed up the test with, "The Monaro eats Mustangs and spits out Nissans. It's a class act that deserves an encore performance." The CV8-Z was offered in the same colours as the standard CV8 but to highlight the model, a new colour was introduced called 'Fusion' orange/gold metallic with unique colour matching (Fusion and black) leather interior. The CV8-Z had unique features including a sunroof, modified darkened taillights, signature black bonnet scoop accents, special engraved CV8-Z wheels, CV8-Z badging throughout the interior and gun metal chrome CV8-Z badging on the exterior. Tony Hyde, the chief engineer of Holden, announced on his retirement in 2007 that being a part of the development of modern Monaro's was his proudest achievement. He described the modern Monaro program as "pure emotion" and that his Monaro will be kept next to his 1976 Chevrolet Corvette.

=== Safety ===
ANCAP test results* Holden Monaro CV8 Coupe (2004)
Test	Score
Overall	4 /5 stars
Frontal offset	12.47/16
Side impact	13.42/16
Pole	Not Assessed
Seat belt reminders	1/3
Whiplash protection	Not Assessed
Pedestrian protection	Poor
Electronic stability control	Not Assessed

== Badge engineered Monaro models (2001–2006) ==
The Monaro was used as a basis for various concept cars and was used by several different brands, HSV in Australia, Chevrolet in the Middle East, Pontiac in North America, and Vauxhall Motors in the United Kingdom.

=== HSV Coupé ===
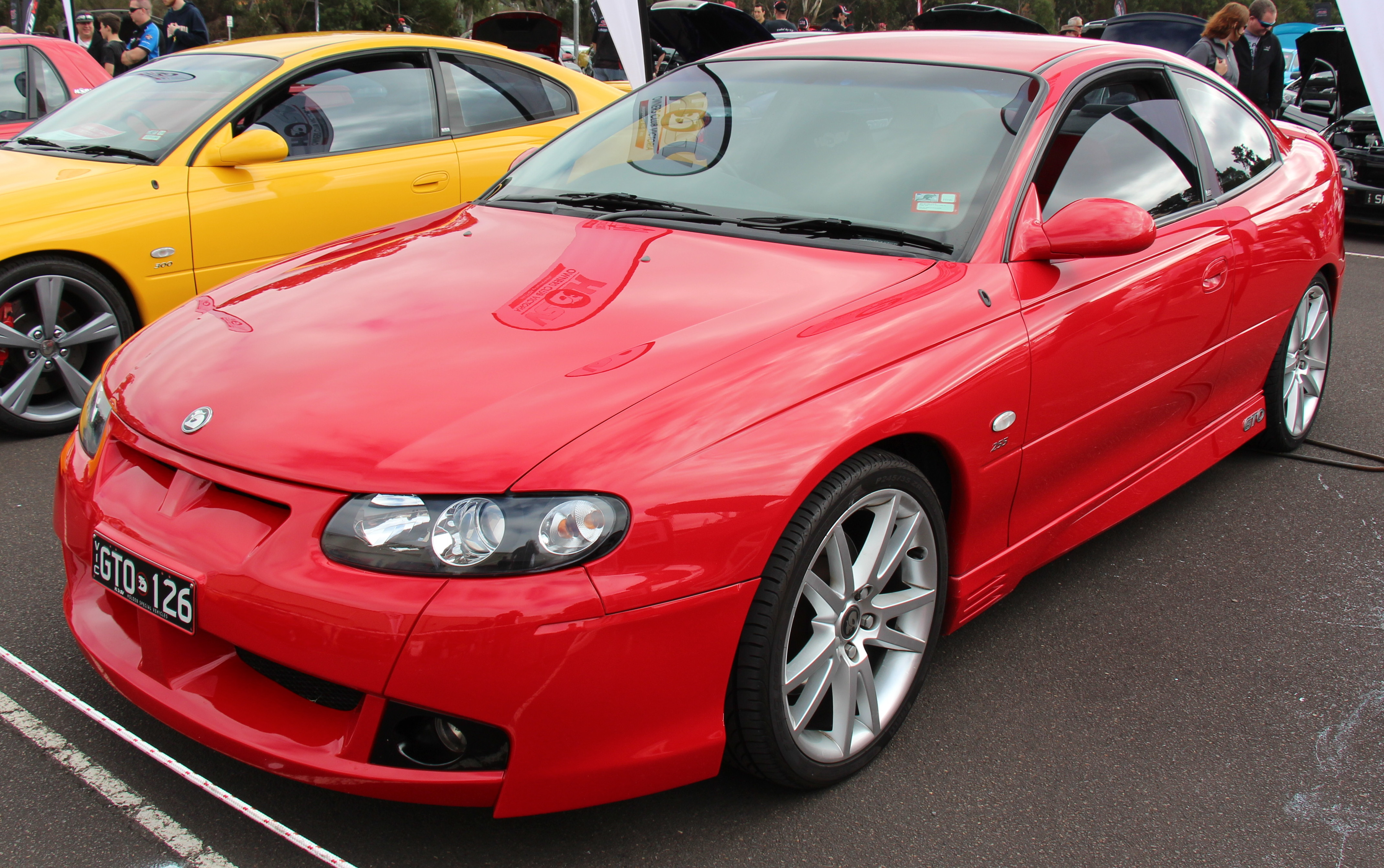
2001-2003 HSV Coupé GTO coupe (V2) (VX)

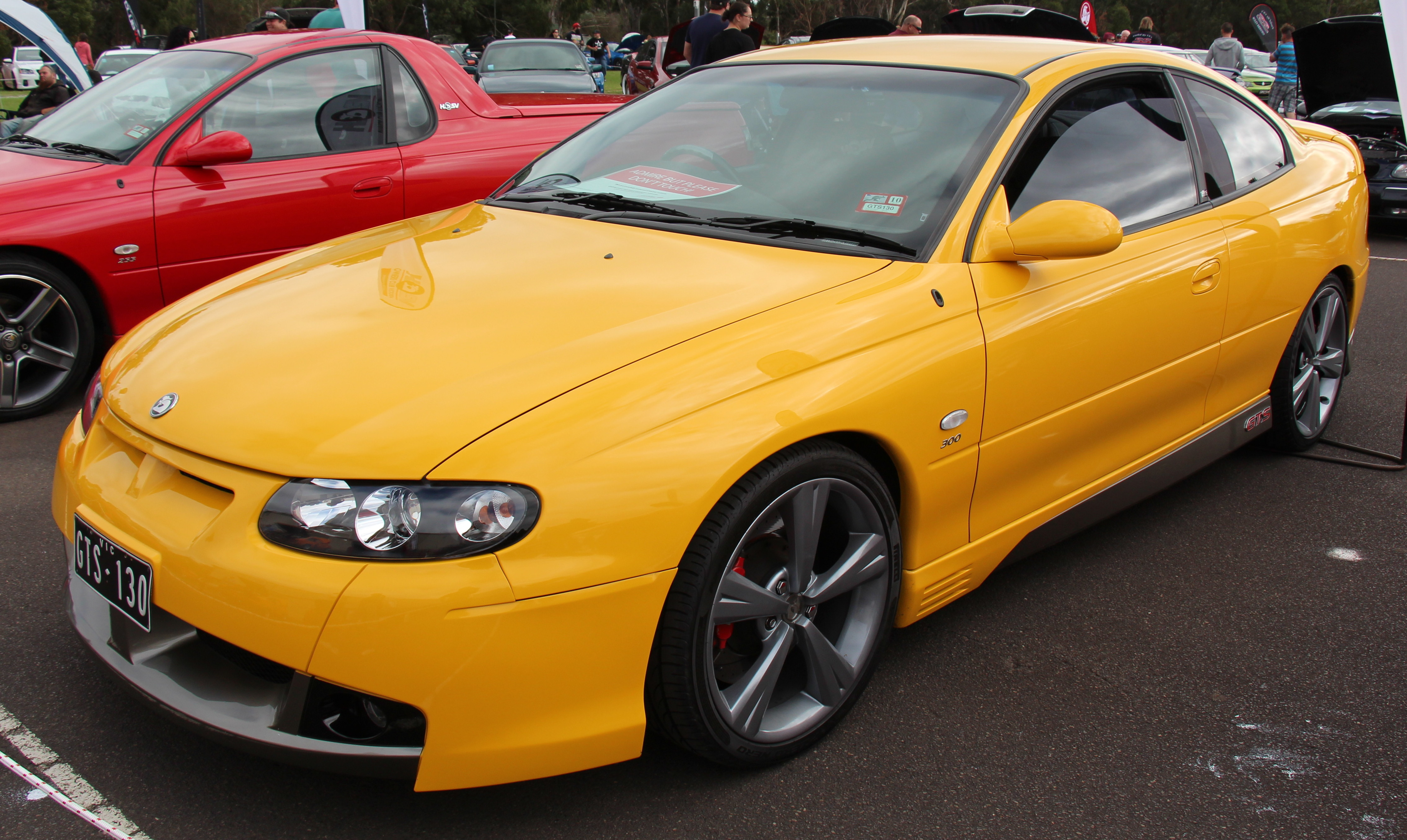
2001-2003 HSV Coupé GTS coupe (V2) (VX)

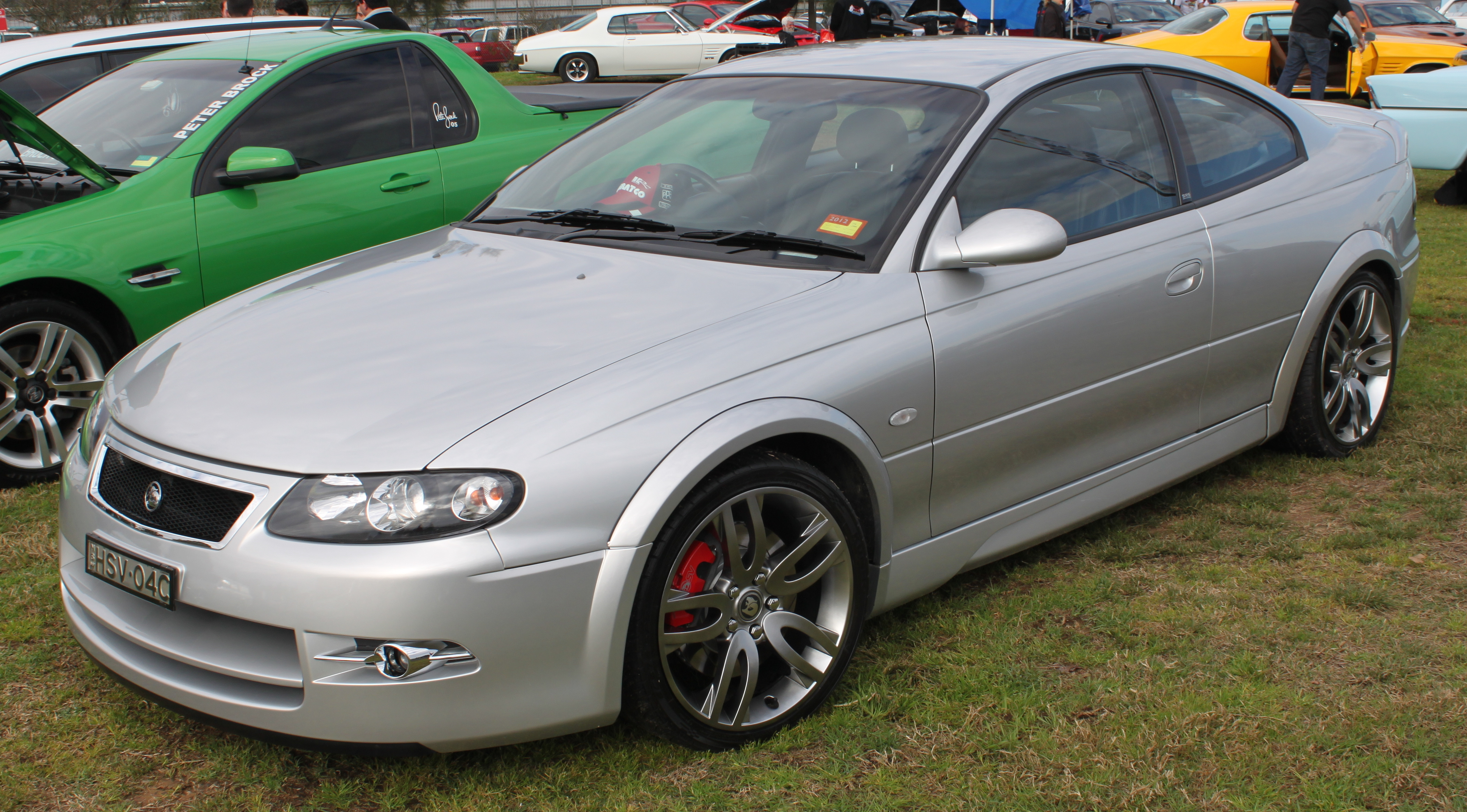
2004 HSV Coupe4 (V2 III) (VYII)

The HSV Coupé is a high performance iteration which was produced by Holden Special Vehicles from 2001 to 2006. It was originally based on the Monaro V2 series but did not carry the Monaro name.

The Coupé's body was built at the Holden manufacturing plant in Elizabeth, South Australia, and then transported and modified at HSV's Clayton production facility. The initial range consisted of two models, the GTO and GTS, which were differentiated by their engine and exterior design. The entry-level GTO Externally, the GTS differed from the GTO in having contrasting colour accents on the bumpers and side skirts.

Between September 2003 to July 2004, a GTO LE (Limited Edition) was also available for sale. The GTS was discontinued in 2004. In May of that year, HSV launched the new luxury-oriented Coupe4, which was essentially a modified GTO fitted with HSV's first all-wheel-drive system.

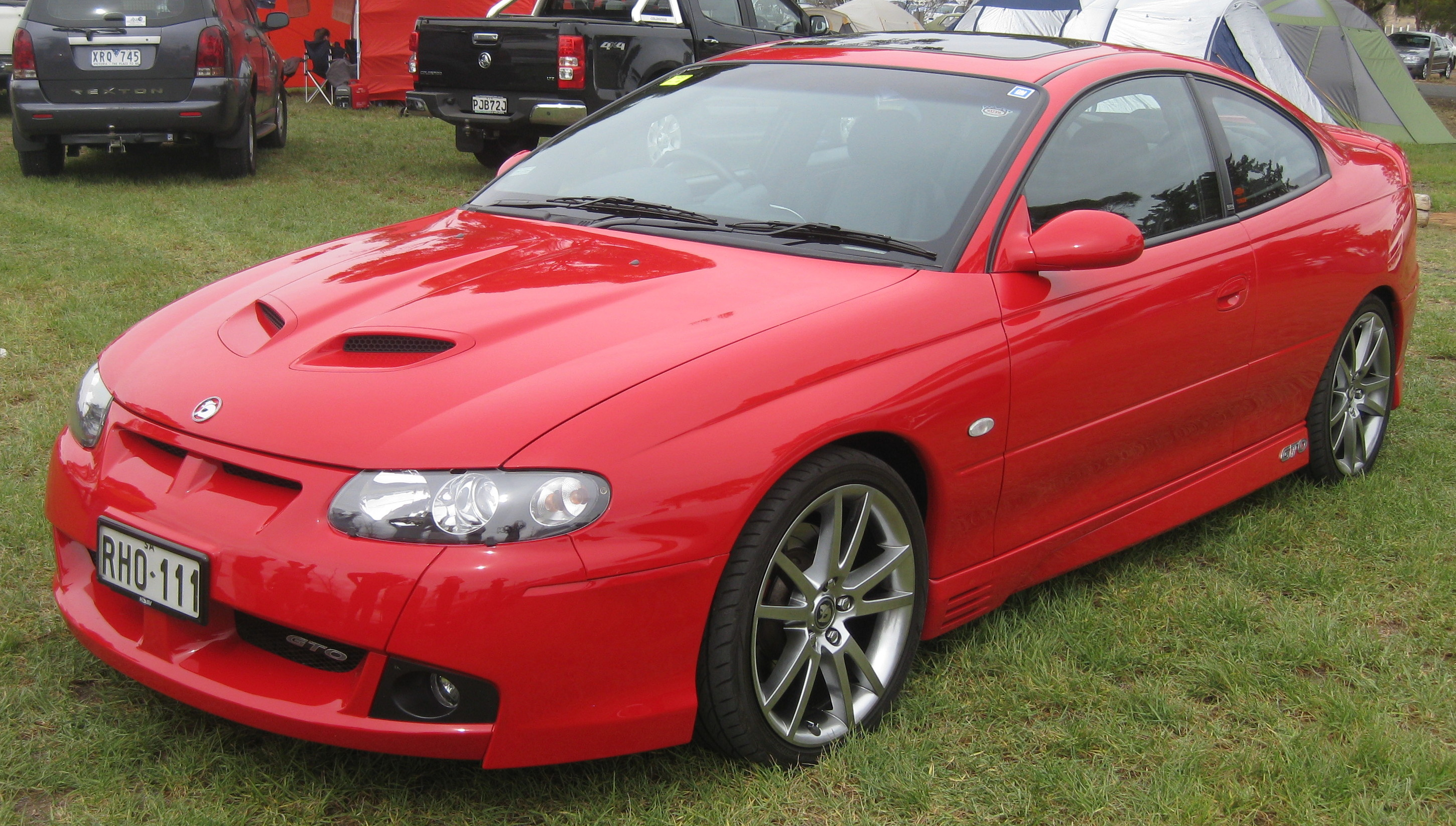
2004-2006 HSV Coupé GTO (VZ)

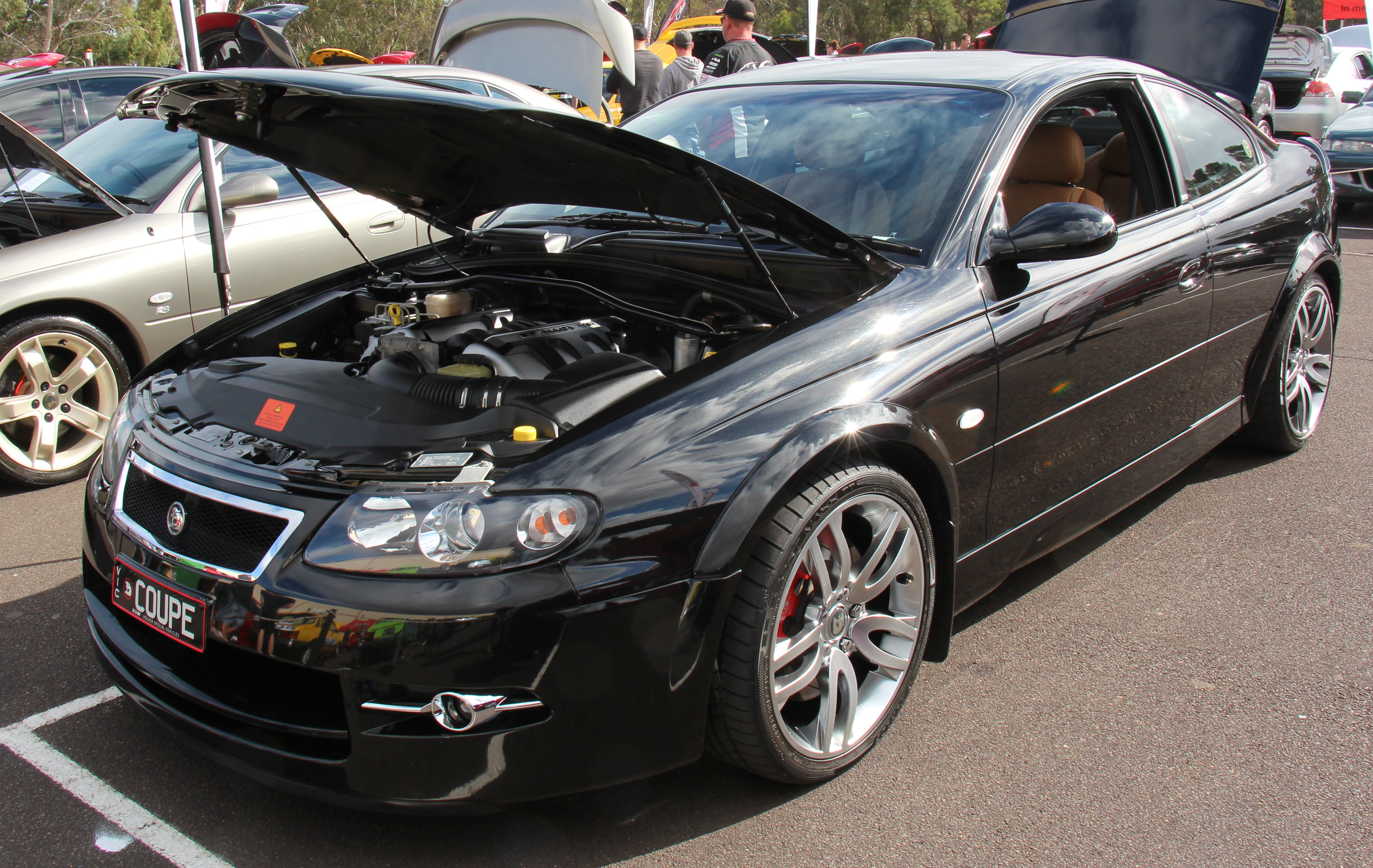
2004-2006 HSV Coupé4 (VZ)

The VZ series facelift of October 2004 aligned the GTO's engine output to the other HSV Z Series models. In line with the announcement made by Holden in July 2005 about the Monaro's end of production, HSV released another GTO LE from April 2006. The Signature Coupe, with a total production of 70 units, was announced in July 2006 and went on sale in August 2006

=== Other variants ===
External image
- 2002 CSV Mondo GT 427 (V2)

Corsa Specialised Vehicles (CSV) started production of the Mondo ("world" in Italian) in 2002, based on the Holden V2 Monaro. The standard option had a LS1 at 265 kW (355.4 hp), or with the 'Stage 2 Engine Enhancement' at 290 kW (388.9 hp), the Mondo GT305 being rated at 305 kW (409.0 hp).

=== Export models ===
The third generation Monaro was exported to several overseas markets. It was also sold, in left-hand drive, in the Middle East as the Chevrolet Lumina Coupe, and in the United States as the Pontiac GTO, reviving another classic muscle car icon. However, at least one commentator has described it as a 'flop' because of its poor US sales. It was withdrawn from the US market in 2006, although a few were still on dealers' lots in 2007.

==== Pontiac GTO ====
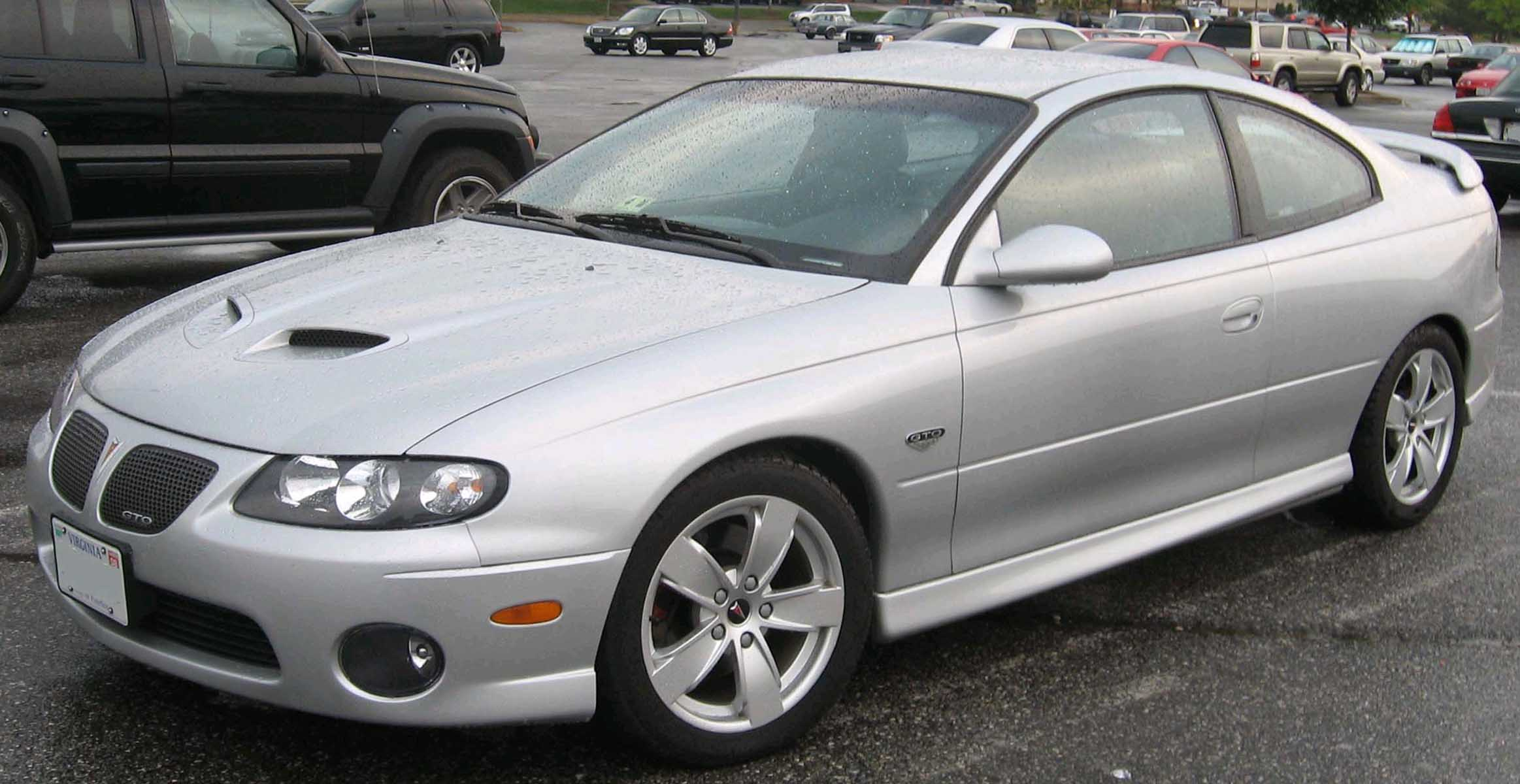
2005-2006 Pontiac GTO (VZ)

The Pontiac GTO was released in 2004, the styling was based on the VY series 2 Commodore version of the Holden Monaro. The Pontiac GTO was facelifted in 2005 to the updated VZ series Holden Monaro. Complaints from American consumers about the Pontiac GTO's bland design led to the addition of twin hood scoops in 2005 with the VZ series Holden Monaro to recall the later muscle-car variants of the late 1960s' models; the hood scoops vent in cool air to the engine bay but do not directly feed the engine. In the eyes of the Australian press, the scoops have spoiled the clean lines of the design, while the American media seemed to accept them. The 2005 and 2006 GTO also received a LS2 6.0 L engine rated at 298 kW (400 hp); the Australian HSV Coupé GTO received a similar engine in its VZ series; and Vauxhall launched this as the Monaro VXR in the UK.

The 40,808th GTO built became the last Monaro-based unit built by Holden.

==== Vauxhall Monaro ====
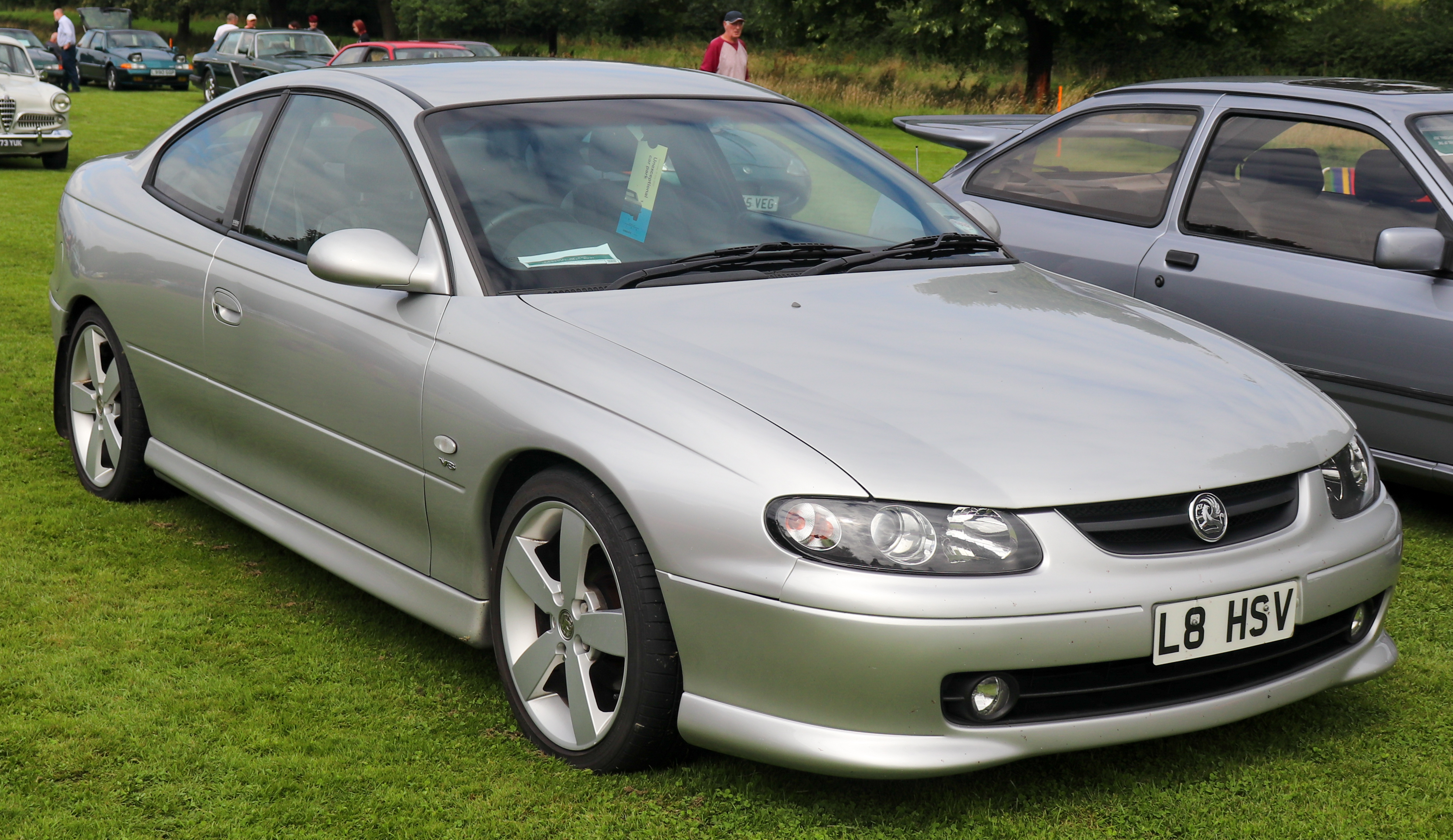
2004-2005 Vauxhall Monaro VXR (V2 III) (VYII)

The Monaro was also sold in the United Kingdom as the Vauxhall Monaro where it won Top Gear magazine's best muscle car award in 2004.

Vauxhall offered the Monaro buyer a limited edition prior to discontinuation of the model: the VXR 500. A Harrop supercharger was installed onto the standard GM 6.0 L LS2 engine by Vauxhall dealer Greens of Rainham in conjunction with tuning firm Wortec, increasing power to 373 kW (500 hp) and torque to 677 N·m (500 lbf·ft). In addition to this, a shorter gear linkage was added to enable quicker shifts. The resultant 0 to 62 mph (100 km/h) was 4.8 seconds.

With the end of production, Vauxhall opted to replace the VZ Monaro in 2007 with the Vauxhall VXR8, a rebadged version of the VE series HSV Clubsport R8 4-door sedan.

==== Chevrolet Lumina Coupe ====
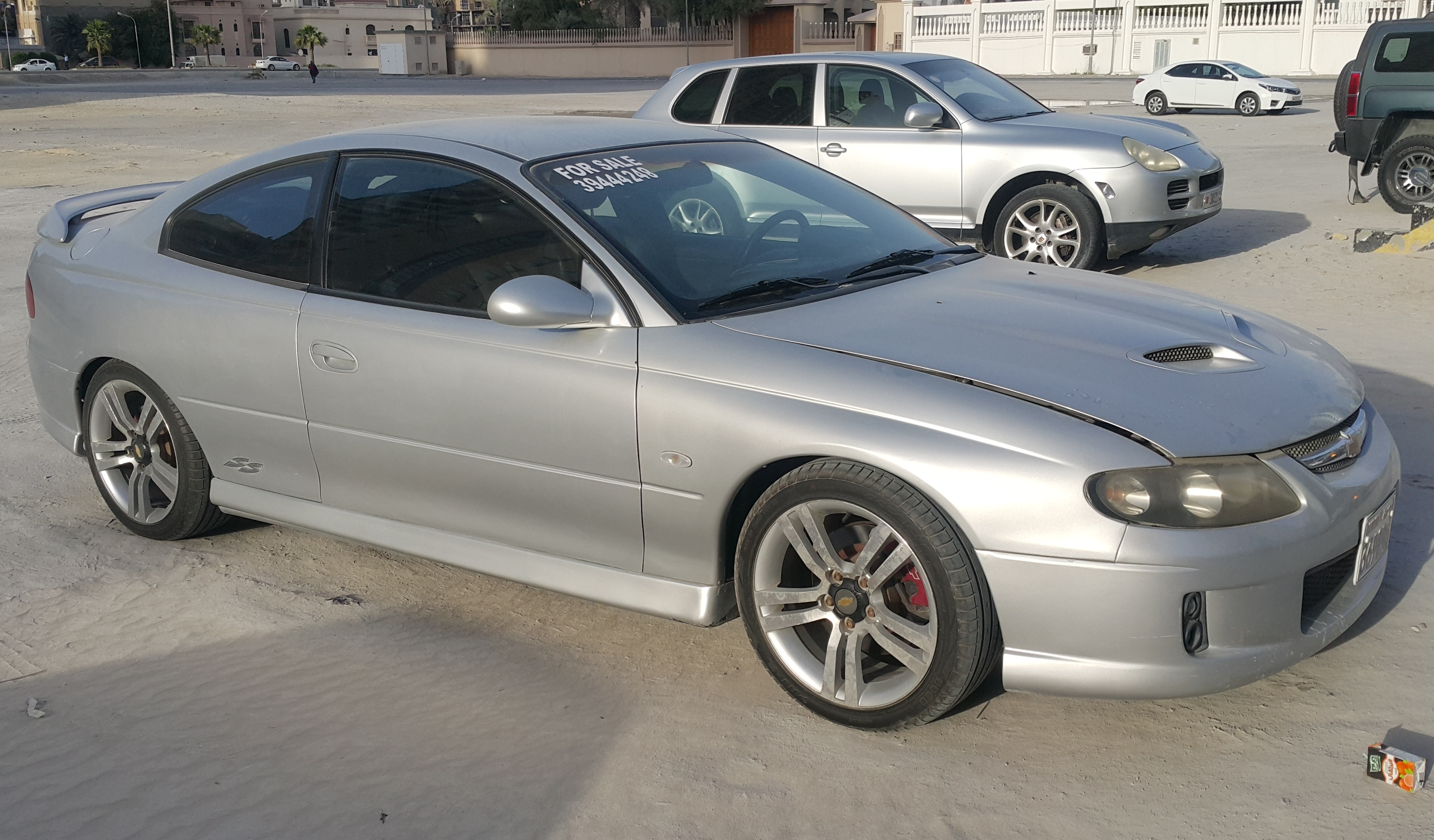
2004-2006 Chevrolet Lumina Coupe (VZ)

The Chevrolet Lumina Coupe, released in 2003, was sold in the Middle East and was positioned as part of the VY and VZ series Commodore-based Chevrolet Lumina range until 2006. The Lumina Coupe was offered in S (CV6), and SS (CV8) trims.

The Lumina S Coupe, which used the 3.8 L Supercharged Ecotec L67 was discontinued along with the CV6 at the end of the VY series in August 2004.

==== Bitter CD 2 concept ====
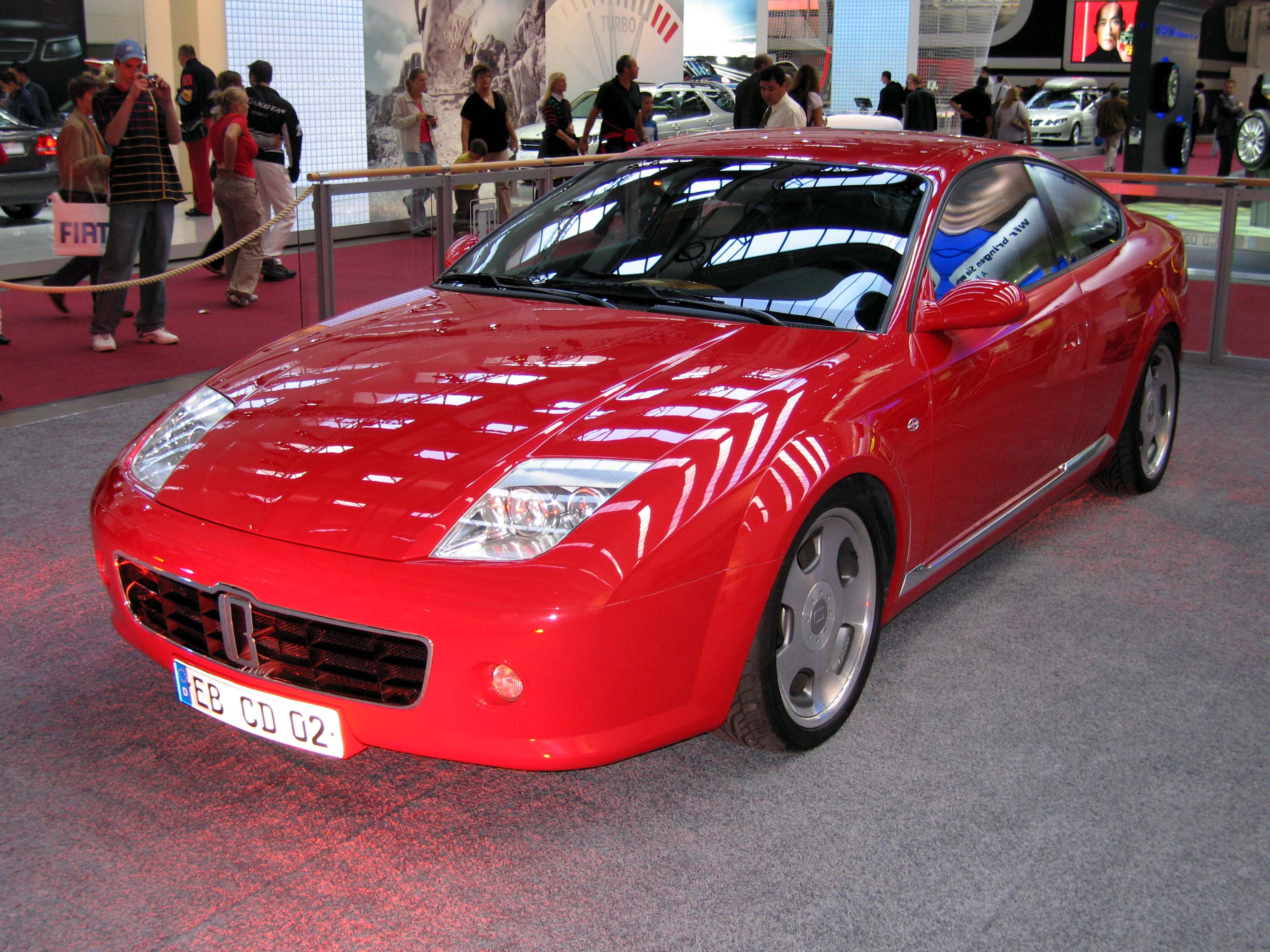
Bitter CD 2

In 2003, Bitter presented a concept car, a modern incarnation of their previous CD model, known as the CD II, based on the Monaro. but was rumoured to feature a V12 engine. Two prototypes were created; investors were sought but the car never reached full production. Bitter Automotive later produced a Holden WM Caprice-based Bitter Vero.

== Concept cars ==
=== 1980s VH project ===
The possibility briefly existed in the early 1980s for a revival of the Monaro badge based on a combination of the Holden VH Commodore and the Opel Monza. With serious exploration of the concept, a Monza was shipped to Australia by Peter Brock but the project was shelved as Holden was more preoccupied, at the time, with engineering work to revamp the Statesman and Gemini range as well as with the launch of the JB Camira.

=== 1998 Coupé ===
This concept car, codenamed "Monica", emerged 20 years after the last Monaro coupé. Publicly displayed at the 1998 Sydney Motor Show, the two-door Coupé was based on the then existing VT-series Holden Commodore, which, in turn, was based on a modified platform of the European Opel Omega B. Journalists quickly christened it the Monaro and orders came flooding in, thus encouraging Holden to produce it. The production model – the third generation Monaro, known as the V2 series – was eventually launched in 2001, by then based on the VX Commodore.

=== 2004 Convertible ===
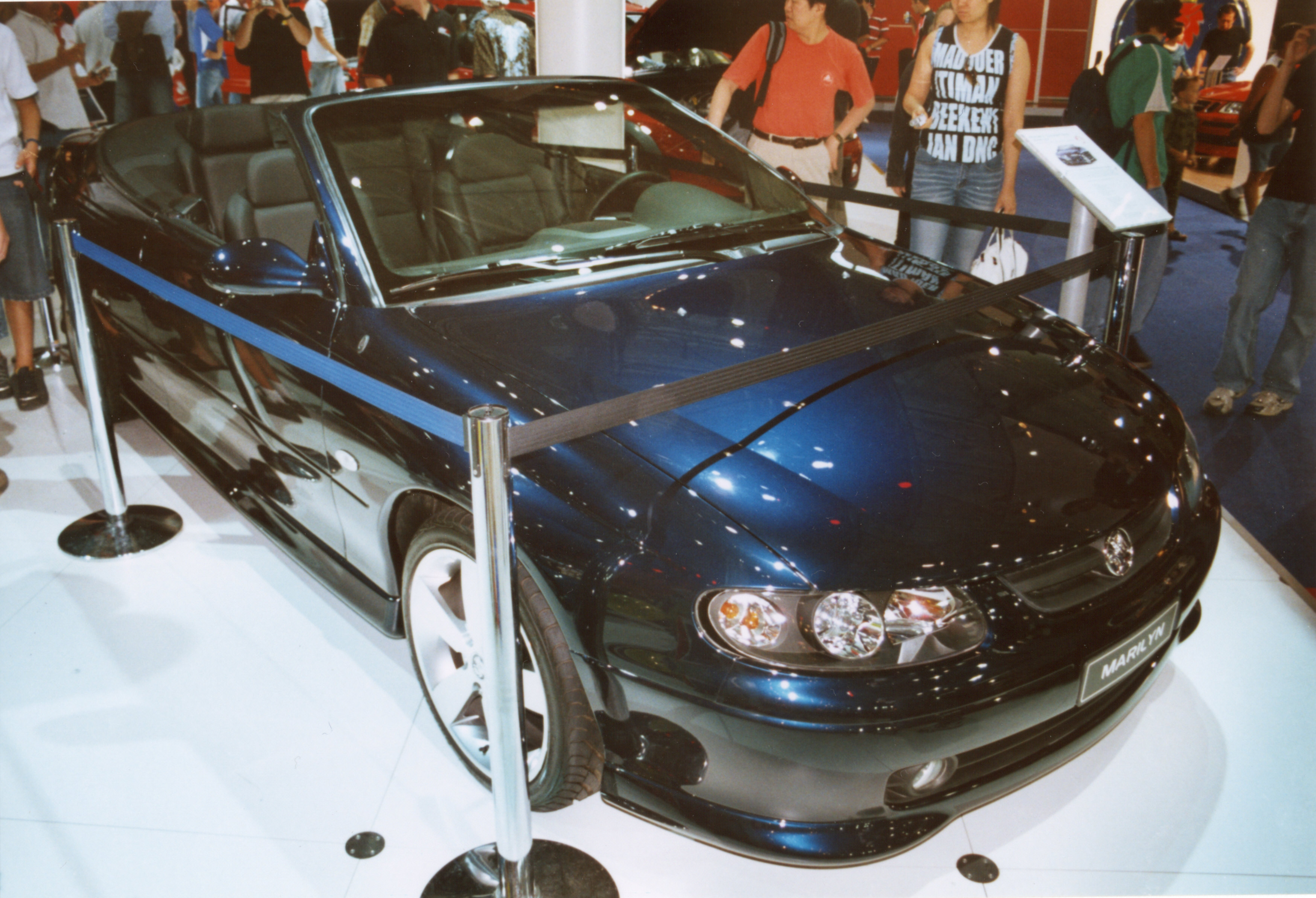
Holden convertible (Marilyn) concept

The Holden Monaro four-seater convertible, codenamed Marilyn, was a fully operational one-off concept car, it was never intended to reach production. It was built in 2002 in left hand drive by TWR Engineering at a reported cost of A$2 million and shown at the 2004 Sydney Motor Show.

=== 2008 Coupé 60 ===
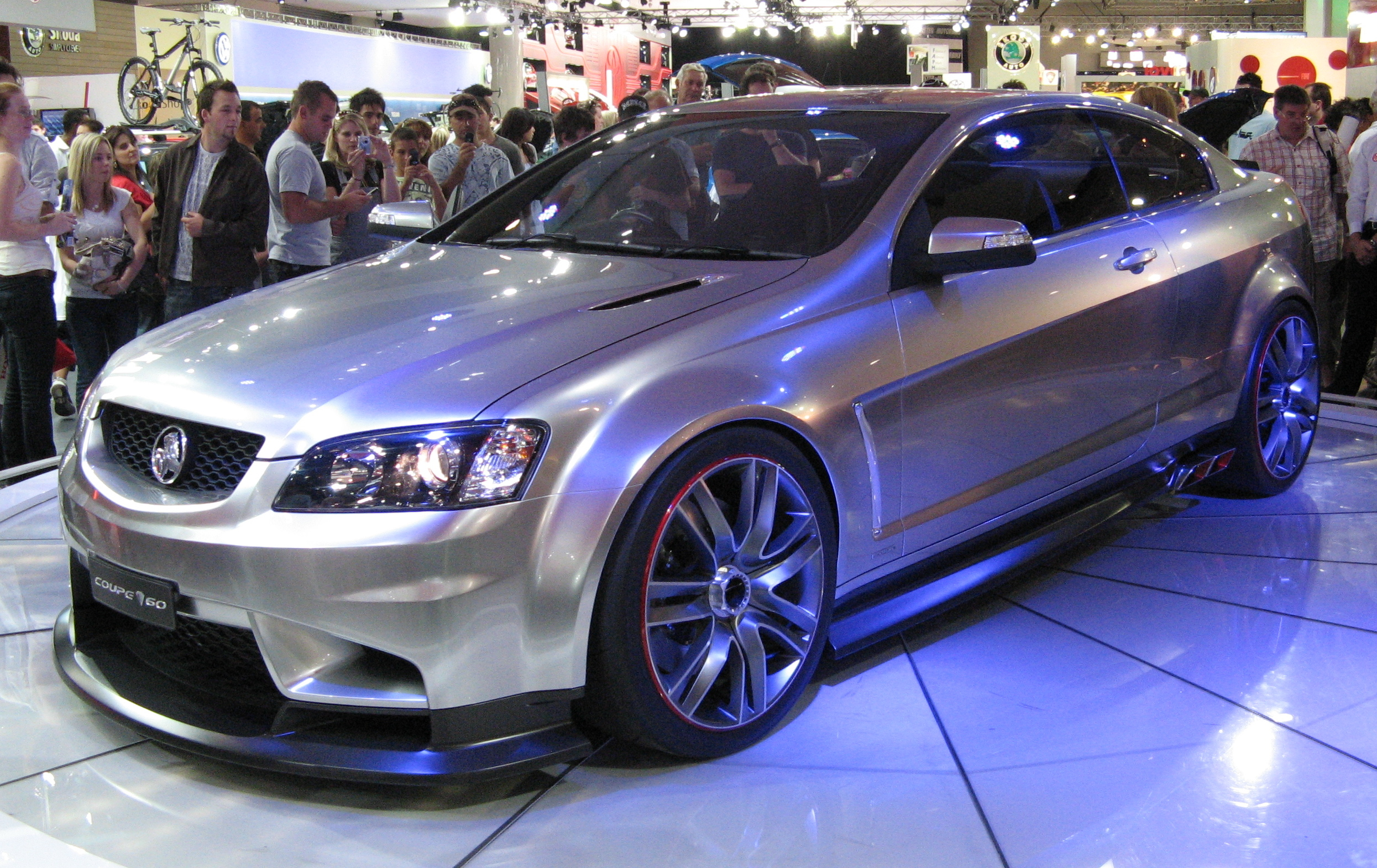
2008 Holden Coupé 60 concept car

This VE Commodore-based concept was presented at the Melbourne Motorshow in 2008 to celebrate Holden's 60th anniversary. It cost A$2.5 million to build but never reached production.

=== 2013 VF project ===
In 2013, the Australian media became aware of a "VF Monaro" digital rendering posted online by design firm, Dsine International, which also saw the input of Holden designers, Simon Gow and Peter Hughes. It remained only a rendering with no production prospects, thanks to the existence, at that time, of the larger volume selling fifth-generation Chevrolet Camaro, which was based on the same Zeta platform of the VE-VF Commodore.

== Sales ==
Holden Monaro sales in Australia
2001	2002	2003	2004	2005	2006	2007	2008	2009
176	4,274	2,889	2,656	1,980	1,158	1,780	116	13

== Motorsport ==
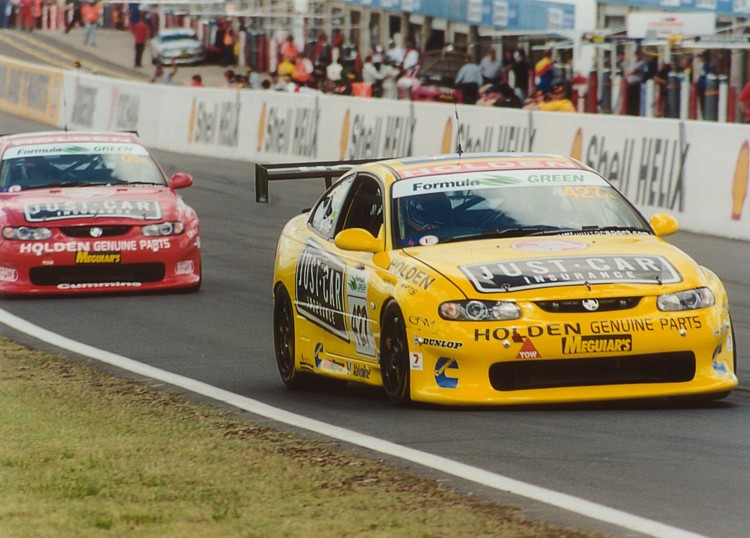
The Garry Rogers Motorsport Monaros at the 2003 Bathurst 24 Hour

A pair of Monaro GT racecars powered by an Australian built version of the 427 cu in Corvette C5-R engine was built by Garry Rogers Motorsport (GRM) to compete in the Australian Nations Cup Championship and won the 2002 and 2003 Bathurst 24 Hour races. This car is often confused for being the 'track' version of the HRT 427, but the racing program headed by then-Holden Motorsport Manager John Stevenson was announced many months before the HRT 427 was revealed to the press and public.

In fact, the first GRM-built car in 'nuclear banana' yellow underwent shakedown laps at Calder Park before a half day's testing at Winton wearing the race number "427". It was then shown to the media and public at the Bathurst 1000 race a week before the HRT 427 was unveiled at the 2002 Sydney Motor Show. Much to the displeasure of V8 Supercars event organisers, Garth Tander drove a lap of the Mt Panorama circuit in the rain, as part of Holden Motorsport's buying track time to promote the 'rival' 24 Hour race event. So as not to preempt the HRT 427's launch the following week, for its sneak Bathurst 1000 unveiling, the yellow Monaro wore the Tander's GRM V8 Supercar race number "34" before reverting to "427" for the 24 Hour race.

The HRT 427 won both the first and last races it competed in. Garth Tander, Steven Richards, Cameron McConville and Nathan Pretty drove the car to a debut win in the 2002 Bathurst 24 Hour, while James Brock – son of legendary driver Peter Brock – drove the third and last 427 Monaro built by GRM to victory in the final race of the 2004 Nations Cup at the Mallala Circuit in South Australia.
