= Philippa Coningsby =

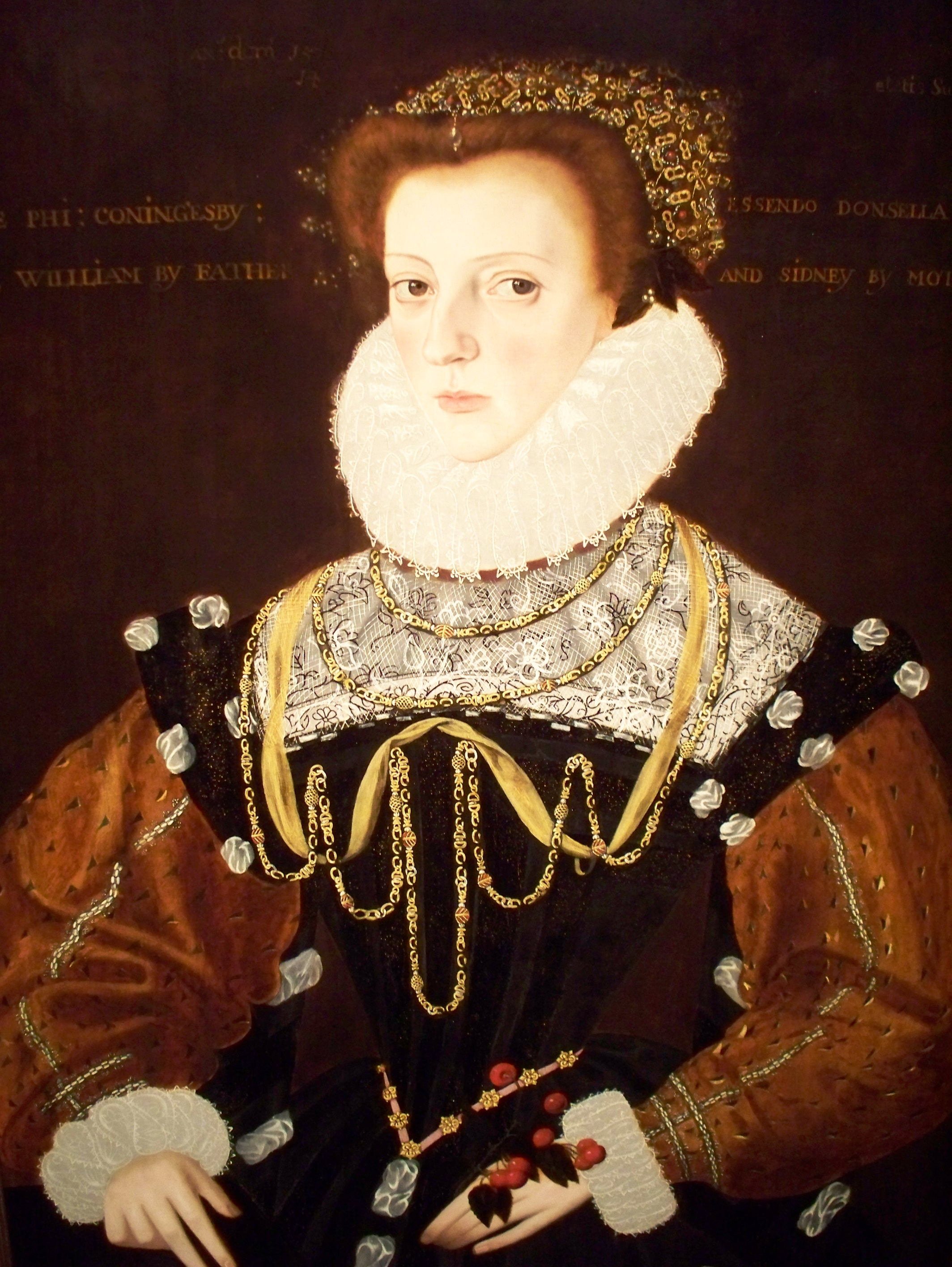
Lady Coningsby in 1578, painting by George Gower

Philippa Coningsby (née Fitzwilliam (died 1596) was an English aristocrat, a daughter of William FitzWilliam of Milton. She married Sir Thomas Coningsby and had 11 children.

As wife of Sir Thomas Coningsby she lived at Leominster and Hampton Court, Herefordshire, where their monogram "TCP" was carved in several places. Coningsby wrote in a letter to Sir Robert Cecil that his wife was his "near kinswoman".

She died in 1596, and was buried at Hope under Dinmore.

In 1617, an unmarried cousin of her husband, Joyce Jeffreys, who was born at Ham Castle at Clifton-upon-Teme, joined the household to be a "perpetual companion" to the younger Philippa Coningsby.
