= Hereford Priory =

Hereford Priory may refer to

- Blackfriars, Hereford, Widemarsh Street
- Saint Guthlac's Priory, between Bath Street and Commercial Road
