= Thomas Coningsby =

English soldier and politician (1550–1625)

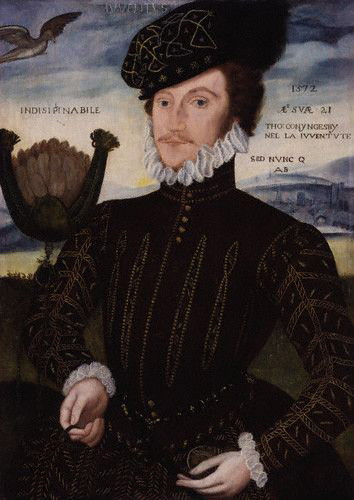
Sir Thomas Coningsby Painting attributed to George Gower.

Sir Thomas Coningsby (9 October 1550 – 30 May 1625) was an English soldier and Member of Parliament, notable for his diary of military action in France in 1591, and his feuds over local representation in Herefordshire.

== Birth ==
Thomas Coningsby was the son and heir of Humphrey Coningsby, of Hampton Court, Herefordshire, by Anne, daughter of Sir Thomas Inglefield, judge of the common pleas. His father, a gentleman-treasurer to Queen Elizabeth, was a grandson of Sir Humphrey Coningsby.

== Early life and military service ==
In 1571 he was said to be love in with Frances Howard (died 1598), a young woman in the household of Elizabeth I. She and her sister Douglas Howard were rivals for the affections of Robert Dudley, 1st Earl of Leicester, and Frances Howard later married the Earl of Hertford.

Coningsby visited Italy with Sir Philip Sidney in 1573, and he was intimate with Sidney until Sir Philip's death, although their friendship was severely strained on their Italian journey by an unfounded charge of robbery brought by Sidney against Coningsby. Coningsby went to Normandy in attendance on the Earl of Essex in 1591, and took part in the siege of Rouen, fighting against the forces of the league. He acted as muster-master to the English detachment, was in frequent intercourse with Henry of Navarre before Rouen, and was knighted by Essex on 8 October 1591. Coningsby was High Sheriff of Herefordshire in 1582 and 1598 and knight of the shire (MP) for Herefordshire in 1593, 1597 and 1601.

== Feud with the Croft family ==
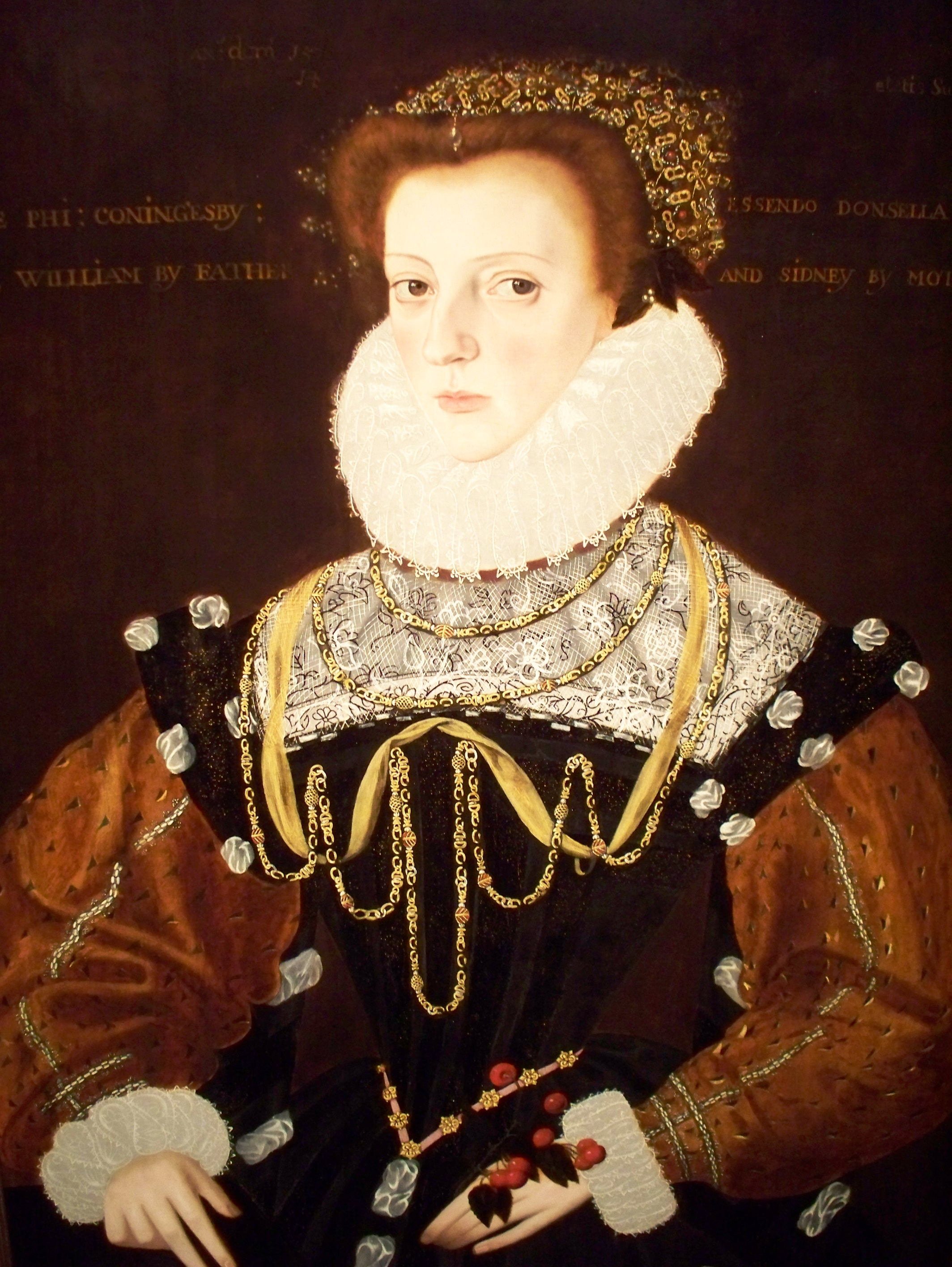
Philippa Coningsby, painted in 1578.

Coningsby had a feud with a neighbouring landowner, Herbert Croft (died 1629) of Croft Castle. Coningsby was called an "Italianate knave" in Leomininster market place. They fought during Hereford assizes in July 1588 and Walter Lewis, a supporter of Croft was killed. Next year Croft brought a large retinue to Hereford to establish his position. In March 1601 Coningsby wrote to Sir Robert Cecil to dispute the appointment of Herbert Croft as Steward of Leominster. His father had been Steward, he had a house at Leominster Priory and another in the town, and an election for the position had been planned. Coningsby expected Cecil to help because his wife, Philippa, was his kinswoman.

== Anne of Denmark ==
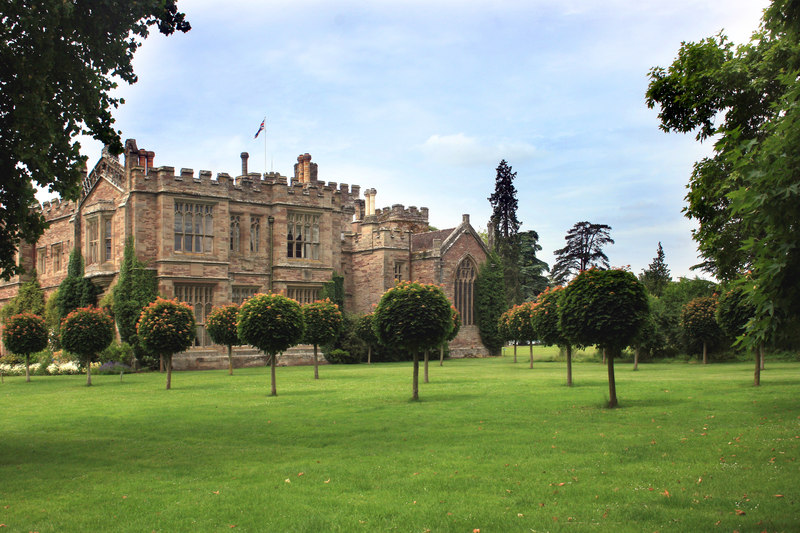
Hampton Court near Leominster

Following the Union of the Crowns in 1603, Coningsby was appointed to a committee managing the jointure lands in England of Anne of Denmark, queen consort to James VI and I. He would report on the queen's manors in Herefordshire and Worcestershire, including Kingsland, Marden, Westharness (Leominster), Stockton (Herefs), Stoke (Herefs), Leominster, Ivington and Hope (near Leominster), and Kings Norton. Coningsby and the other councillors were invited to come to court to kiss the queen's hand and receive their instructions when the plague had subsided.

Coningsby surveyed the rents from the royal manors in 1604 and reported to Robert, Lord Sidney, the queen's chamberlain. Coningsby used this as an opportunity to criticise his local rival Herbert Croft. He wrote to Sidney from Hampton Court in "this spacious and fertile Manor of Leominster", noting that his new role in the county was a "a thing very displeasing" to Croft.

Many years earlier, Edward Croft (Herbert Croft's father) had unsuccessfully courted Barbara Gamage, who chose to marry Robert Sidney instead—a circumstance that may have influenced Coningsby's appointment.

A portrait of his daughter Anne Coningsby, attributed to Marcus Gheeraerts the Younger, has a later inscription mentioning that she was a maid of honour to the queen. John Davies of Hereford taught writing to Anne and her sister Elizabeth. At this time, Coningsby made negotiations for Anne's marriage to Robert Harley overly difficult, and the plans failed. For this aspect of his character, Coningsby is said to have been the very model of Sir Puntavarlo in Ben Jonson's, Every Man out of His Humour, and in one performance an actor dressed in his clothes.

Coningsby and wife had portraits painted in 1612, possibly by Gheeraerts, and he was depicted with "Crickit the dwarf".

After Anne of Denmark died in 1619 the Leominster manors were given to the Marquess of Buckingham.

== Later life ==
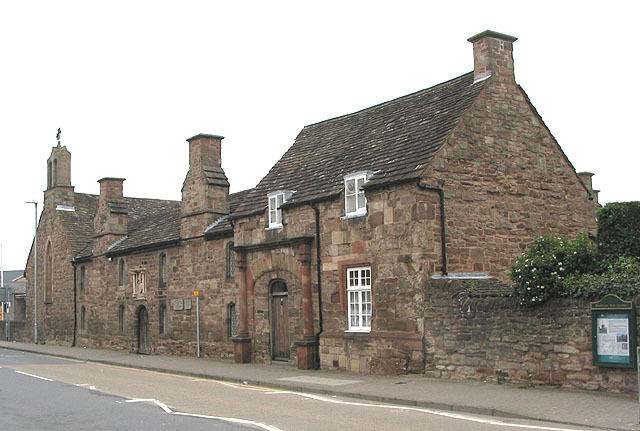
The Coningsby Hospital in Hereford

In 1614 Coningsby founded a hospital in the suburbs of Hereford for superannuated soldiers and servants called 'Coningsby's Company of Old Servitors', this is now open on Wednesdays and Saturdays from Easter to September and is free to visit and you can learn about Thomas Coningsby and his impact on the site.

On 12 November 1617 he joined the council of Wales under the presidency of William, Lord Compton. An unmarried cousin, Joyce Jeffreys, who was born at Ham Castle at Clifton-upon-Teme, joined the household at Hampton Court in 1617, to be a "perpetual companion" to Phillipa Coningsby.

Thomas Coningsby died on 30 May 1625, aged 74.

== Marriage and family ==
Thomas Coningsby married Philippa, second daughter of Sir William Fitzwilliam of Milton, near Peterborough and his wife Agnes Sidney. Philippa was a cousin of Sir Philip Sidney. They had six sons and three daughters. All his sons except one died before him. His children included: (Note: see Robinson, Mansions (1872), pp. 168–9 for the full family pedigree.)

- Fitzwilliam Coningsby, who married Cicely, daughter of Henry Nevill, 9th Baron Bergavenny, their son Humphrey married Lettice Loftus, and was the father of Thomas Coningsby, 1st Earl Coningsby
- Katharine Coningsby, who married Francis Smallman of Kinnersley Castle, Herefordshire
- Elizabeth Coningsby, who married Sir Humphrey Baskerville of Eardisley Castle, Herefordshire
- Anne Coningsby, who married in 1608 Sir Richard Tracy (died 1638) of Hatfield or Hasfield and Stanway, Gloucestershire.

== Diary ==
Coningsby is the author of a diary of the action of the English troops in France in 1591. It proceeds day by day through two periods, 13 August to 6 September, and 3 October to 24 December, when it abruptly terminates. The original manuscript is among the Harleian Manuscripts at the British Library. It was first printed and carefully edited by J. G. Nichols in the first volume of the Camden Society's Miscellanies (1847). Internal evidence alone gives the clue to the authorship.
