= Joyce Jeffreys =

English moneylender (c.1570–1650)

- Born: c.1570
- Died: 1650 (aged 79–80)
- Occupation: Moneylender
- Parents: Henry Jefferies (father); Anne Coningsby (mother)
- Relatives: Thomas Coningsby (cousin)

Joyce Jeffreys (Jeffries) (c. 1570 – 1650) was a single female moneylender in seventeenth-century England. She lived most of her adult life in Hereford, England although she moved around to stay with family due to the English Civil Wars.

== Biography ==
An account book that Jeffreys kept between 1638 and 1648 in which she recorded both business and personal transactions has survived and been published. It gives an insight into the life of a woman who was a member of the provincial gentry in the West Midlands during a period that included the First English Civil War.

When Jeffreys died in 1648 her body was interred in the chancel of parish church of Clifton-upon-Teme. Over the vestry door of the church, there is a brass plaque commissioned by Sir Thomas Winnington in 1857 and dedicated to her memory.

=== Early life ===
Joyce was the product of both her parents' second marriages and her mother went on to have a third marriage. Her father was Henry Jefferies of Homme Castle in the parish of Clifton-upon-Teme, Worcestershire. Her mother Anne, was the widow of Johannes Coningsby of Neen Sollars, Shropshire. Her father's social sphere provided her with good connections. Historians also believe he left her with a good inheritance though the will did not survive. Her mother's next marriage gave her the title of "lady" and provided Joyce with connections to local gentry as well as a modest sum when her mother died. Joyce had two half siblings from her mother's previous marriages, Katherine and Humphrey Coningsby. The three stayed very close for their whole lives. Humphrey never married but did become wealthy as a travel writer and left Joyce the sum of one hundred marks annually, divided into payments given to her twice a year, in addition to interest and other goods. He also named her his executrix, which is very telling of their relationship. Joyce remained single her whole life, which was not the norm in the seventeenth century for a woman, but, thanks to having a family with good connections, she was able to keep in good standing with her community. Having never married, Joyce was a spinster.

=== Business ===
After her mother's death, Joyce lived with her cousin, Sir Thomas Coningsby at Hampton Court near Leominster, from 1617 to 1625 until his death, as a "perpetual companion" for his wife Philippa Coningsby. This was a significant time for her moneylending career. The years of living with him exposed her to even more influential people to add to her social circle and no doubt improved her education. Sir Thomas left Joyce £10 a year from rent on rural property he owned as well as his late wife's linen. After Sir Thomas's death, Joyce lived on her own, and the education and connections she gained from living with him directly helped her moneylending business with both skills and networks to clients. She gained a network of people from the counties of Herefordshire, Worcestershire, Shropshire, and Breconshire through her cousin. After Sir Thomas's death Joyce moved to Hereford. We know she began lending there because in 1634 she went to mayor's court to sue for a debt owed to her. Moneylending was not an uncommon trade for a single woman and was many women's primary source of income. Joyce made £5,890 out on loan in 1639, which was probably her most profitable year. Her only account was a diary of her business transactions with personal notes that dated from 1638 to 1649. These showed her to be a detailed and thorough person.

=== Later life ===
Joyce's life was not the cultural norm for women in the seventeenth century. Most women were involved in textile work as that was a more suitable trade for a woman at that time, so Joyce is not unique in having an occupation. It was very common that women would have jobs and work, but they usually did this within the home under the name of their husband or father. Because of her connections, Joyce was able to develop her business as a moneylender successfully enough to support herself and a substantial household. After the death of her cousin, a more central location nearer to her customers was more desirable for her. Around 1638, she was renting a house in Widmarsh Street. Joyce then bought a house and garden from another spinster on Widmarsh Street in Hereford. At this time, she did not live alone her goddaughter, Eliza Acton, lived with her until Eliza married in 1643. Joyce maintained her and even provided her dowry of £800, which was a very significant amount. Joyce retained a sizable household that included a manservant named Matthias Rufford, who provided many services to her and remained in her service the rest of her life. In addition she always had three maidservants and a cook and cook's maid, for whom she provided basic necessities like clothes as well as luxuries such as pocket money. She had quite a considerable household for a single woman in the seventeenth century.

=== End of life ===
Joyce mentions in her records that Nurse Nott was taking care of her in her final days in March 1648. In her will, she left her servant, Elizabeth Newton £100 which was loaned to James Seaburne on mortgage for Elizabeth and in Joyce's’ own words, “'it being a stock which I have raised and saved for her out of her wages and interest money'.” When she died her nephew William calculated that her collective worth was £1,408 14s 8d total this was the sum of £743 18s 8d due her in 1650, and another £664 16s due in 1651. She was left with the debt of a cousin and this sum was not enough to cover it but her codicil to her will suggests her commitment to paying them. Her funds were severely depleted from what they had been at the height of her moneylending days. She died with a substantial decrease in wealth than what she had at her prime.

== English Civil Wars ==
Panic from the advance of the parliamentary troops made Joyce have to flee the city of Hereford on 21 September 1642, during the First English Civil War. She stayed with many of her relatives who would take her in and sometimes feared for her life. Throughout all this, she paid her way and kept Rufford and several other servants with her. She returned to the city September 30 only to leave again shortly thereafter. She was able to maintain her moneylending business in Hereford by having servants run her errands for her. She hired Anthony Alldridge, who was a mason, to build her a house in Hereford in March 1643. She lent him money to do this which she did not expect back since she said as much in her records. The city surrendered to the parliamentary troops on 24 April 1643. Despite this, he finished the house, and she came back to live in it in April 1644. Joyce did not stay long in Hereford, as later in April 1644 she stayed with relatives for the summer. She had to make difficult decisions about cutting her losses and selling her property in Hereford due to the threat of loss or destruction resulting from the conflicts between the parliamentary and royal armies. Her property was in the line of defenses the city was trying to erect to protect it. Among her properties threatened were her new house, and four other small rooms in buildings as well as a Hereford mercer. Because of attack on the city, she stayed with some of her family in Horncastle from July to August.

== Female Moneylenders ==
Joyce Jeffriess was a successful moneylender who was financially secure enough to not only provide for herself but also others and was always known for being extremely generous and always giving gifts. Interest rates were not terribly common back then and hers never exceeded 8%, which was a very fair price. Her success is not all her own. Joyce was able to maintain her moneylending business because of her generous inheritance. It took a substantial amount of money to maintain a moneylending business, and although she was not alone as a female moneylender, it was not common for a spinster to be as financially secure as Joyce. She was left with good connections and with significant amounts of property to allow her to maintain her business and a comfortable living. Most women did not stay single like Joyce since it was not the most stable position for women because marriage provided women with protection and financial stability. Yet, being a spinster allowed her much more financial freedom than a married woman and in a lot of ways, more freedom than even some men. Unfortunately, a woman who was not married was often suspected of being a prostitute or promiscuity. Being a single woman did not make Joyce an outcast of society, and her vast social circles disprove this common misconception about single women in this time period. She often borrowed money for her own lending business, which was a common practice in the seventeenth century. Her moneylending brought her over £500 some years, though it varied. She may have been one of the more successful moneylenders, but she is by no means an extraordinarily unique woman because there were other spinsters who enjoyed a large social group as well as benefited from moneylending businesses of their own. For instance, Hester Pinney ran a moneylending business, invested and bought bonds and shares; she also was involved in her family's lace business. She like Joyce and numerous other single women made her wealth by money lending. Women who were moneylenders like Joyce often had legacies, which they could use to invest.

== Works ==
The diary, extracts from which are printed in Archaeologia (1857, xxxvii, 189–223), was burnt in the fire which destroyed the Winnington library at Sanford Court, Stanford on Teme. (Note: The Winnington family was related to the Jeffreys family through marriage and that is how the diary came to be library at Sanford Court.) There is a modern edition of the diary:

- Spicksley, Judith, ed. (March 2012). The Business and Household Accounts of Joyce Jeffreys, Spinster of Hereford, 1638-48. Oxford: British Academy. ISBN 978-0-19-726432-4.
