= O'Haran =

Irish surname

The Irish surname (O)Haran is an anglicized form of the Gaelic surname Ó hEaghráin. The prefix "Ó" ("Ua" in Middle Irish) signifies "son of" or "descendant" and would indicate the patronymic origin of the surname, while the second element of the name is the genitive case of the name Eaghra, the eponym and ancestor of the related clan Ó hEaghra. The surname is mentioned in Part 15 of the Annals of the Four Masters: "1052 AD, Echthighern Ua hEaghráin, successor of Ciaran of Cluain-mic-Nois and of Comman, died on his pilgrimage at Cluain-Iraird." O'Haran and O'Haren may also designate the Irish surname Ó hAnradháin / Ó hAnracháin of either Leinster or Munster, although this is considered rare.

In a survey of birth indexes for Ireland that was carried out in 1890, there are thirty seven instances of the surname Haran or Haren with both names being most numerous in County Mayo, County Sligo, and County Clare. The surname has often been confused with Heran. However, Heran is a different name, derived from the Gaelic surname "Ó hEaráin", which was a distinct sept located in Oriel .

The prefix "Ó" which originally accompanied this surname has, by now, largely disappeared. In general, Gaelic prefixes tended to be discarded as early as the middle of the seventeenth century (the time of the Gaelic and Catholic submergence) and despite a revival of sorts in the late nineteenth century, were usually never resumed.
