= Richard Pembridge =

English soldier and administrator (died 1375)

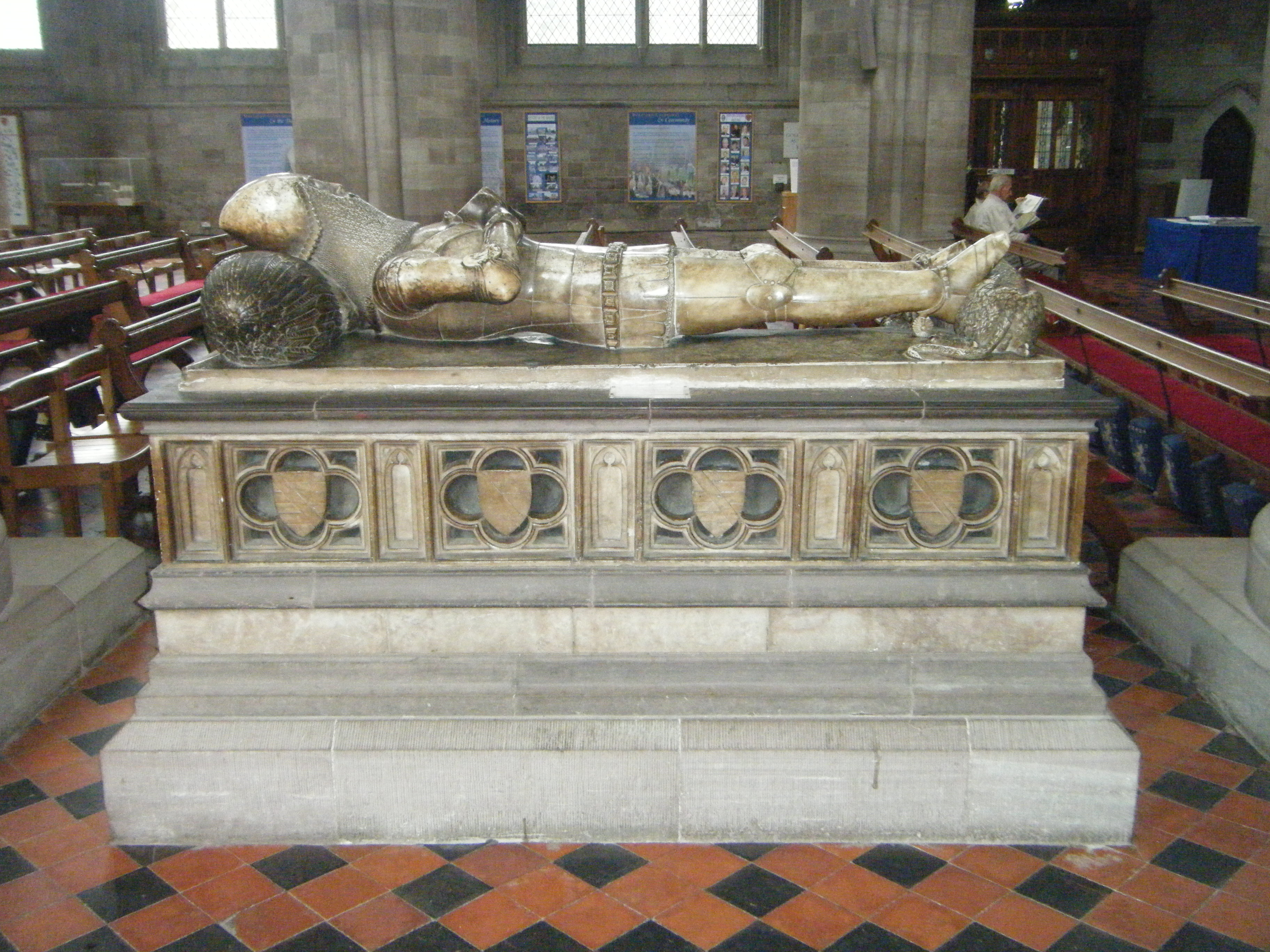
Monument with effigy of Sir Richard Pembridge, Hereford Cathedral, originally in the Black Friars Monastery, removed here at the Dissolution of the Monasteries

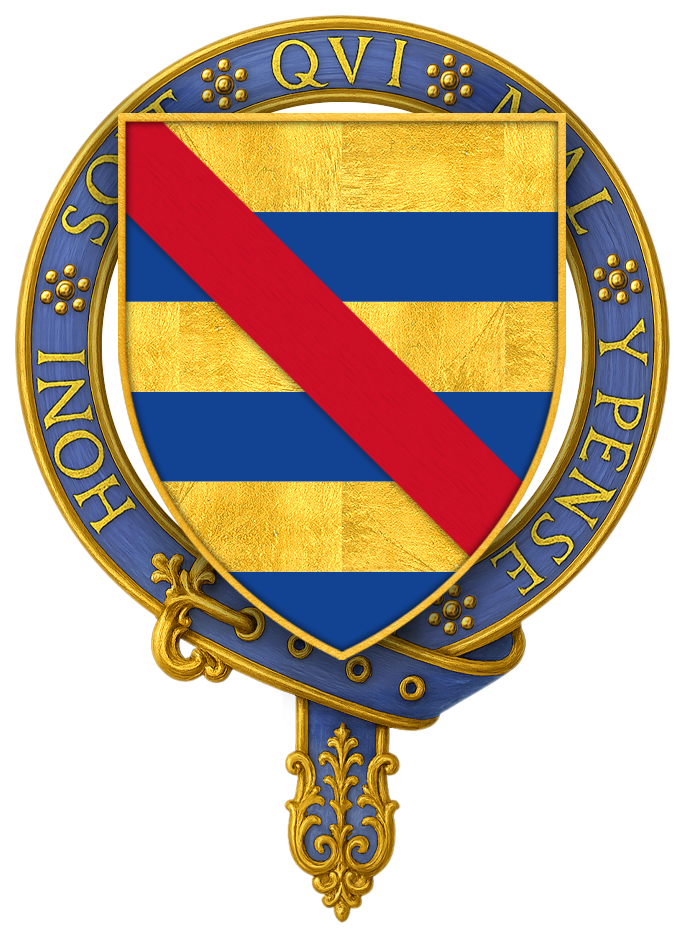
Arms of Sir Richard Pembridge, KG: Barry of six or and azure a bend gules, circumscribed by the Garter. Arms as sculpted within quatrefoils on chest tomb supporting his effigy

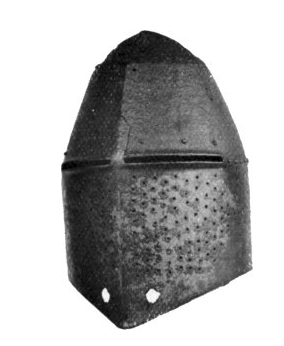
Steel helm of Sir Richard Pembridge, one of only four 14th-century knight's helms to survive. National Museum of Scotland, Edinburgh

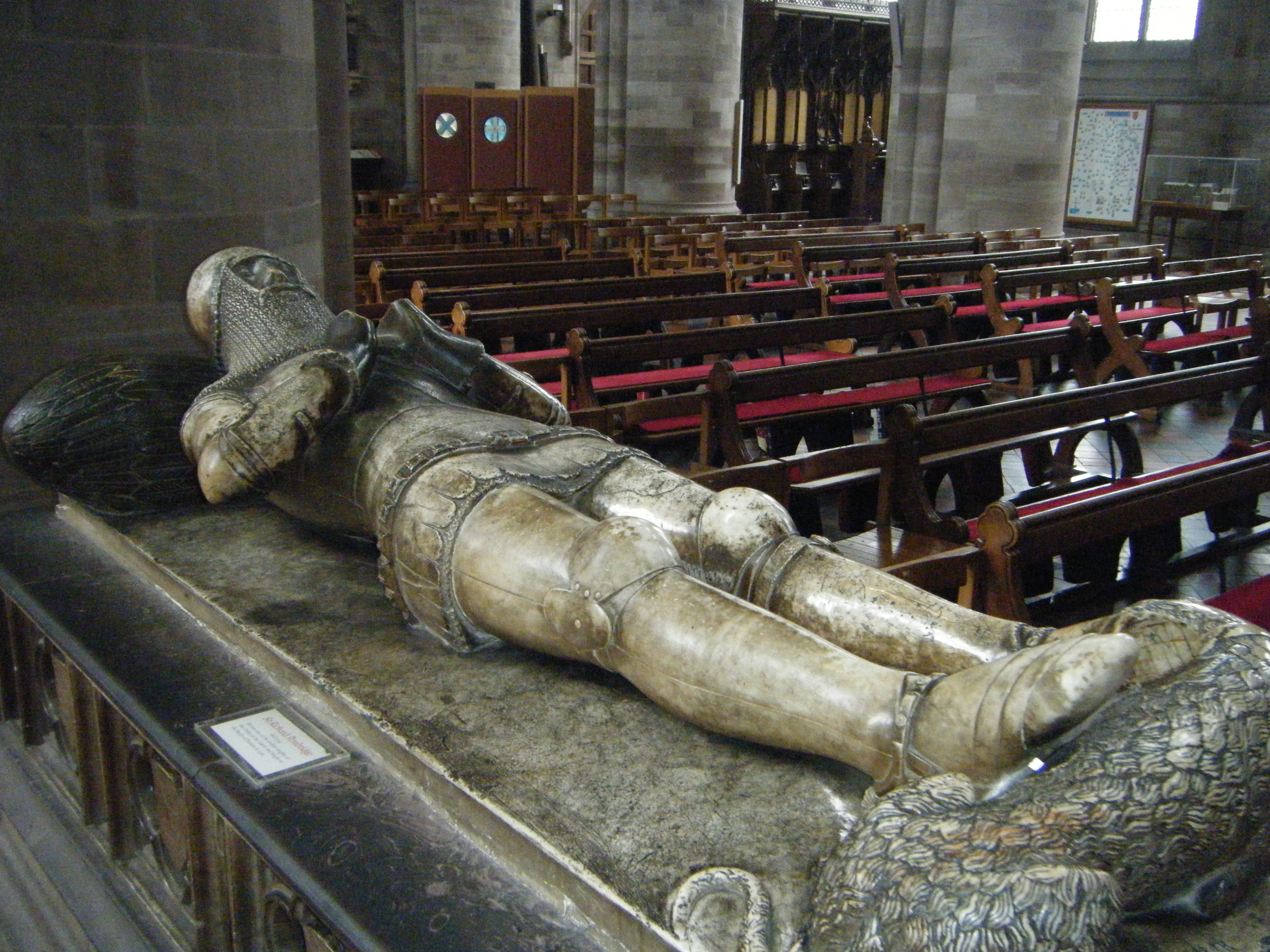
Effigy of Sir Richard Pembridge, Hereford Cathedral, showing the Garter worn on his left leg below the knee. His head rests on a helm with crest atop it of a plume of feathers and his feet rest on a dog

Sir Richard Pembridge KG (died 1375), was one of the earliest appointed Knights of the Garter.

== Career ==
A Herefordshire and Shropshire man, related to the Pembridge family of Tong Castle, he fought at sea at the Battle of Sluys (1340) and alongside King Edward III at the Battle of Crécy (1346) and at the Battle of Poitiers (1356) during the Hundred Years' War. He served the king as Custodian of Southampton Castle in 1361 and then as Constable of Dover Castle and Warden of the Cinque Ports in 1370. He was appointed a Knight of the Garter in 1368. In 1372 he refused to accept the post of Lieutenant of Ireland and as a result was in some disgrace at his death in 1375.

== Marriage and children ==
He married Elizabeth le Strange (d.1362), a daughter of John le Strange, 2nd Baron Strange (1305–1349), of Blackmere, by his wife Ankaret le Boteler, daughter of William Boteler, 1st Baron Boteler (died 1334), of Wem. Elizabeth was the widow successively of Edmund St John, 3rd Baron St John (d. 1347), of Basing, who died at the Siege of Calais in 1347, and of Gerard de Lisle, 1st Baron Lisle (1304-1360) of Kingston Lisle. By Elizabeth he had one son:

- Henry Pembridge (1360-1375), who died at the age of 15 and predeceased his father.

== Death and succession ==
He was buried in the Black Friars Monastery in Hereford. As he died without surviving issue his eventual heirs were his nephews Sir Richard Burley and Sir Thomas de la Barre.

== Monument ==
His monument with recumbent effigy was originally situated in the Black Friars Monastery in Hereford, but following the Dissolution of the Monasteries was moved to its present location in Hereford Cathedral. He is sculpted in life-size in alabaster, fully armed and wearing the Garter on his left leg below the knee. Fisher (1898) wrote:

There are still traces of colour on this monument and gold remains on the points of the cap to which the camail is fastened, as also on the jewelled sword-belt. A sheaf of green coloured leathers is separated from the tilting helmet, on which the head rests, by a coronet of open roses. When the effigy was brought here it had but one leg left, and that the gartered one. A wooden limb was carved, and the workman showed such accuracy in duplicating the stone leg that the Knight was adorned with a pair of Garters for many years until Lord Saye and Sele, Canon Residentiary, presented the Cathedral with a new alabaster leg, and the wooden one was banished to a shelf in the library.

His steel helm, one of only four 14th-century knight's helms to survive, is held at the National Museum of Scotland in Edinburgh.
