= Gerard Lisle, 1st Baron Lisle =

English nobleman and soldier

Gerard II de Lisle, 1st Baron Lisle (1304 – 9 June 1360) of Kingston Lisle (Latinised to de Insula ("from the Island"), French de L'Isle) was an English nobleman and soldier during King Edward III's campaigns in Scotland and France.

== Origins ==
He was born c. 1304, the son and heir of Sir Warin de Lisle, of Kingston Lisle in the parish of Sparsholt, Berkshire, Keeper of Windsor Castle, by his wife Alice le Tyeys, daughter of Henry le Tyeys, 1st Lord Tyeys. His grandfather was Gerard I de Lisle of Kingston Lisle, the younger son of Robert de Lisle of Rougemont by his wife Alice FitzGerold (granddaughter of Henry I FitzGerold (d. 1173/4)), the heiress of Kingston. The arms of Barons Lisle of Rougemont were: Or, a fess between two chevrons sable. In 1269 Alice granted the manor of Kingston to her younger son Gerard I de Lisle, whose family adopted the arms of FitzGerold: Gules, a lion statant guardant argent crowned or.

== Residence ==
He resided chiefly at Stowe Nine Churches in Northamptonshire and Kingston Lisle (in Sparsholt), Berkshire (now Oxfordshire).

== Career ==
He was knighted in 1327. In 1329 he proved his right to free warren in his demesne lands at Stowe and Kislingbury, Northamptonshire by grant of King Henry III to Geoffrey de Armenters. In 1332 Richard Herman was attached to answer Gerard de Lisle concerning a plea why with force and arms he broke the close of the said Gerard at Alverston, Hampshire and dug in his separate soil there, and took and carried away twenty cartloads of earth extracted therefrom to the value of 40 shillings, and depastured, trampled on, and consumed his grass once growing there to the value of 60 shillings. In 1339 Gerard had a dispute with his mother, Alice, regarding the presentation of the church of Stowe, Northamptonshire, but admitted it was not his turn to present; he also complained of trespass on his park at Stowe.

He served on the English side in the Second War of Scottish Independence in 1333 and 1335, under Richard FitzAlan, 10th Earl of Arundel. He served with him again during the Hundred Years' War in France and fought at the Battle of Crécy, 1346.

== Created Baron Lisle ==
He was summoned to Parliament on 15 December 1357, by writs directed to Gerardo de Insula or de L'Isle, whereby he is held to have become Baron Lisle. He was summoned to a Council on 20 June 1358.

== Marriages and children ==
He married twice:

- Firstly (after 3 December 1329), to Eleanor de Arundel (d. before 1347), daughter of Edmund de Arundel (or Fitz Alan), Knight, 9th Earl of Arundel, by Alice, daughter of William de Warenne, Knight. She was the widow of William de Saint John. In 1338 he settled the manors of Stowe and Church Brampton, Northamptonshire on himself and his wife Eleanor. She was living in 1342, in which year Gerard sued his receiver, John son of Robert de Hulle, regarding various monies received from various manors, among them Abbotstone, Hampshire and Walberton, Sussex, which Eleanor held in dower of her first marriage. He presented to the churches of Abbotstone, Hampshire, 1349, and Mundford, Norfolk, 1349 and 1352. She was dead by 1347 when he contracted to marry Margery, widow of Nicholas de la Beche, late Constable of the Tower of London, but who was abducted and married by Sir John Dalton. By Eleanor, Gerard had one son:
  - Sir Warin Lisle, 2nd Baron Lisle
- He married, secondly (before 1 July 1351 (date of settlement) and possibly as early as 29 July 1349 (date of his presentation to Abbotstone church)), to Elizabeth le Strange (d. 1362), daughter of Sir John le Strange, 2nd Baron Strange of Blackmere, by Ankaret le Boteler, daughter of William le Boteler, 1st Baron Boteler of Wem. Elizabeth was the widow of Edmund St John, 3rd Baron St John (died at Calais on 18 August 1347). After his death his widow Elizabeth, married as her third husband Richard de Pembridge (or Pembrugge), KG, of Orwell, Cambridgeshire, Burgate and Lyndhurst, Hampshire, etc., Warden of the New Forest, Governor of Bamborough Castle, Governor of Dover Castle and Warden of the Cinque Ports, Chamberlain of the Household. She died 14–16 September 1362. Warin (??? Surely should be Gerard de Lisle) had by his second wife Elizabeth le Strange two sons and one daughter:
  - Richard de Lisle
  - Henry de Lisle
  - Elizabeth de Lisle, who married Edmund de Stonor, Knight, of Stonor, in Pyrton, Oxfordshire.

== Other ==
In 1351 Philip Warde, formerly bailiff of Gerard de Lisle in the manor of Walberton, Sussex, owed him a debt of £10 7s.

Peerage of England
New creation	Baron Lisle; 1357–1360	Succeeded by Warin Lisle
