= Airgíalla =

Mediaeval Irish overkingdom

Oriel Airgíalla
- 331–1585
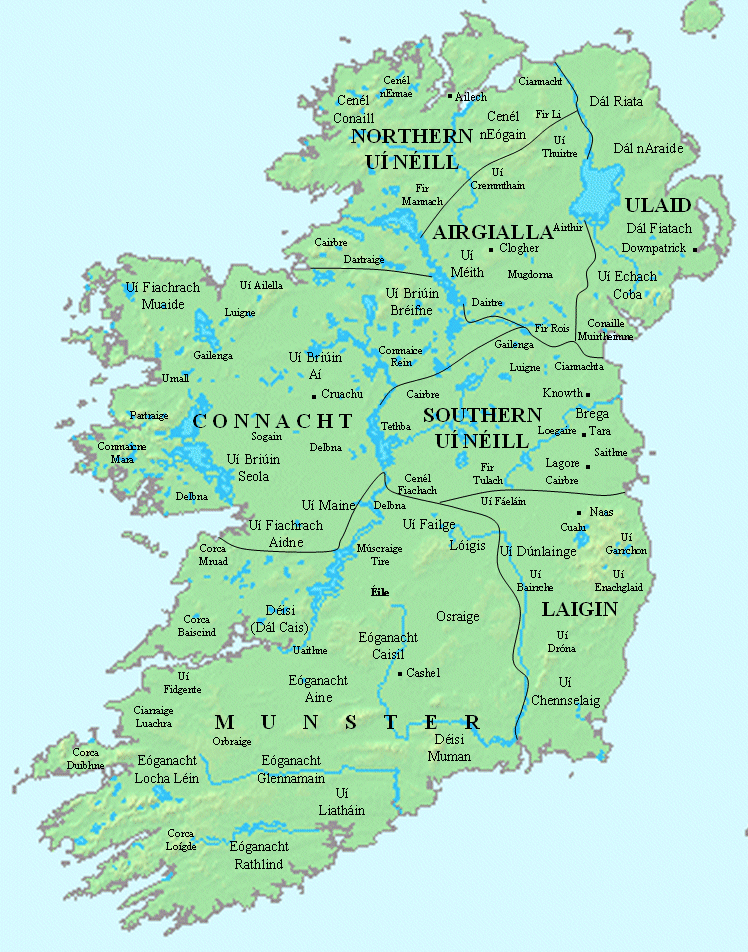
- Airgíalla and other Irish kingdoms in the 7th–8th century
- Common languages: Middle Irish, Early Modern Irish, Latin
- Religion: Gaelic Christianity; Catholic Christianity; Gaelic tradition
- Government: Tanistry
- Rí
  - 331–?: Colla Uais
  - 1579–1585: Rossa Buidhe Mac Mathghamhna
- History
  - Established: 331
  - Disestablished: 1585
- ISO 3166 code: IE
Preceded by	Succeeded by
Ulaid	Kingdom of Ireland
- Today part of: Ireland; United Kingdom

Airgíalla (Old Irish pronunciation: [ˈœɾʲɣʲiːa̯l̪a]; Modern Irish: Oirialla, English: Oriel, Ariella Latin: Ergallia) was a medieval Irish over-kingdom and the collective name for the confederation of tribes that formed it. The confederation consisted of nine minor kingdoms, all independent of each other but paying nominal suzerainty to an overking, usually from the most powerful dynasty. Airgíalla at its peak roughly matched the modern dioceses of Armagh and Clogher, spanning parts of counties Armagh, Monaghan, Louth, Fermanagh, Tyrone and Londonderry. Its main towns were Armagh and Clogher. The name's usage survives as a cultural area of folk tradition in South East Ulster and adjoining areas of County Louth.

According to legend, Airgíalla was founded by the Three Collas, who are said to have conquered what is now central Ulster from the Ulaid. The decisive victory was the battle of Achadh Leithdheirg, said to have been fought around the year 331. However, this tale is thought to be mostly fiction, and the actual year and circumstances of how the Airgíalla confederation came about is unknown.

Originally thought to have been under the dominance of the neighbouring Ulaid to the east, the territory of the Airgíalla from the 6th century onwards was gradually eroded by the encroachment of their northern neighbours, the Cenél nEógain of the Northern Uí Néill, as well as the Southern Uí Néill to their south. From 735 they fell under the dominance of the Cenél nEógain, and by 827 had become their vassals. The kingdom of Airgíalla was at its peak in the 12th century, under king Donnchad Ua Cerbaill. The later constricted kingdom of Airgíalla survived in Monaghan—which was known as Oirghialla and Oriel after the Norman Invasion of Ireland—under the Mac Mathghamhna, until the end of the Gaelic order in Ireland.

== Etymology ==
Airgíalla, referring to both the Irish over-kingdom of Airgíalla, and the confederation of tribes that formed it, may mean 'those who give hostages' or 'hostage givers', presumably in reference to the included territories' vassalage. It is commonly anglicised as Oriel; however, archaic anglicisations include Uriel, Orial, Orgialla, Orgiall, and Oryallia, along with the latinisation Ergallia.

After the Anglo-Norman invasion, the anglicisation Uriel became the name of the part of Airgíalla that had extended into modern-day County Louth. Similarly, the portion of Airgíalla that survived in modern-day County Monaghan, became known as Oirghialla, from which derives the anglicisation Oriel.

In early manuscripts, the Bishop of Clogher was styled "Bishop of Oirialla".

== History ==
=== Origins ===
==== According to legend ====
In the beginning of the 4th century, three warlike brothers, known as the Three Collas, made a conquest of a great part of Ulster, which they wrested from the Ulaid. It was the after the battle of Achadh Leithdheirg, fought around 331, that they founded Airgíalla. In this battle the forces of the Three Collas defeated the forces of Fergus Foga, king of Ulster, who was slain, and the victors burned to the ground Emain Macha, the ancient capital of Ulaid.

However, in general it can be shown that the origin legend was written (or composed) in the second quarter of the 8th century to seal their alliance with the Northern Uí Néill.

==== Historical emergence ====
The earliest reference to the Airgíalla occurs in the Annals of Tigernach under the year 677, where the death of Dunchad mac Ultan, "Rí Oigriall", is noted. However, it is suspected of being a retrospective interpolation. On the other hand, the entry in the Annals of Ulster under the year 697 which lists Mael Fothataig mac Mael Dub as "Rex na nAirgialla" may indeed be genuine. Both Mael Fothatag and his son, Eochu Lemnae (died 704), are listed among the guarantors of the "Cáin Adomnáin" in 697. Thus it is believed that the Airgíalla were probably in existence as an entity by then, or certainly by the opening years of the 8th century.

Approximate location of Airgíalla c.900

=== Downfall of the Realm ===
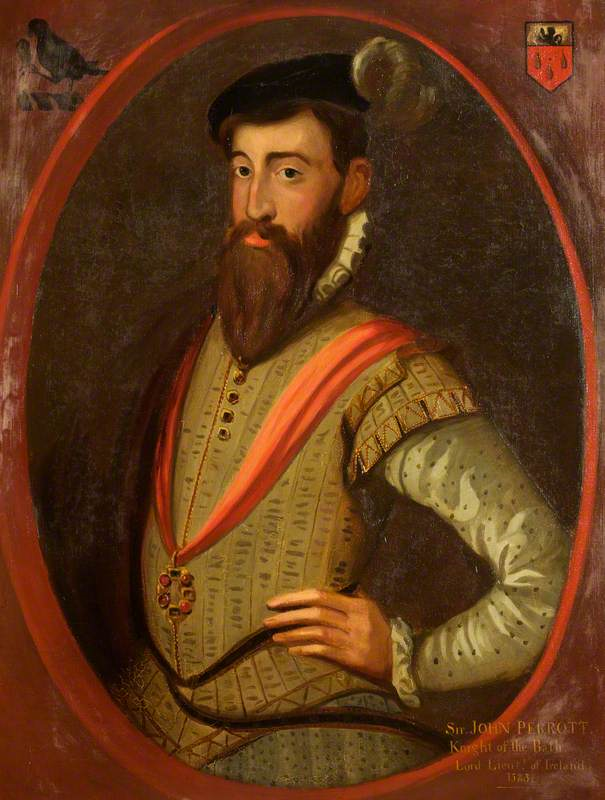
Rossa Buidhe surrendered Airgíalla to Lord Deputy, John Perrot.

The Kingdom of Airgíalla came to an end in 1585 when Rossa Boy MacMahon agreed to surrender and regrant his territories to the English Crown in Ireland, with his territory becoming County Monaghan in the Tudor Kingdom of Ireland. Rossa Buidhe had ascended to the Airgíalla kingship in 1579 and found himself geopolitically in an undesirable position; wedged between an expanding Tudor kingdom and Tír Eoghain under the O'Neill. Initially, Rossa Boy made moves which suggested an alliance with Tír Eoghain, as he married the daughter of Hugh O'Neill, Earl of Tyrone. However, evidently hoping to be left alone to run affairs locally, while pledging allegiance to a distant monarch in Elizabeth I, the MacMahon met with John Perrot, then Lord Deputy of Ireland (according to some, a natural son of Tudor monarch Henry VIII) and agreed to join their Kingdom of Ireland. Airgíalla, now known as Monaghan, was divided into five baronies under native Gaelic chiefs, mostly from the MacMahon themselves.

This was not the end of the matter, however. Fearing the encroachment of the English, moving in closer and closer to his own territories, Hugh O'Neill turned to Brian Mac Hugh Og MacMahon of Dartree and married off another daughter to him. Brian Mac Hugh Og was then the tanist to the chieftainship of his people according to the native Brehon laws and O'Neill was hoping to bring the "phantom" Airgíalla realm back into his camp on the death of Rossa Buidhe through this pact. For his part, Ross Buidhe was trying to engineer a pro-English succession through his brother Hugh Roe MacMahon. When the new Lord Deputy, William FitzWilliam began to pressure the acceptance of an English High Sheriff of Monaghan, O'Neill used his influence to exact opposition to it from clansmen in Monaghan (the same policy was promoted in Leitrim, Fermanagh and Donegal to encircle Tyrone). As a consequence, a military force led by Henry Bagenal was sent into the county in early 1589 to impose the sheriff and by the summer of that year, Rossa Boy was dead.

== Dynastic groups ==
Airgíalla was composed of nine minor-kingdoms, each named after their ruling dynasty. These were:

- Uí Tuirtri, also spelt as Uí Tuirtre, meaning "descendants of Tort". They were based east of the Sperrin Mountains in eastern County Londonderry and Tyrone. From 776, the Uí Thuirtri had moved east of the River Bann and into the over-kingdom of Ulaid, and by 919 they had lost all links to the Airgíalla.
- Uí Maic Cairthinn, meaning "descendants of Cairthend". Based south of Lough Foyle in north-western County Londonderry.
- Uí Fiachrach Arda Sratha, meaning "descendants of Fiachrach of Ard Straw". Based at Ardstraw in modern-day County Tyrone. They became subject to the Cenél nEógain by the 12th century, and expanded southwards into Fir Luírg, in County Fermanagh.
- Uí Cremthainn, based in what is now parts of modern-day County Fermanagh, Monaghan, and Tyrone.
- Uí Méith, based in modern-day County Monaghan.
- Airthir, meaning "Easterners". They were based around the city of Armagh, and held control of the offices of the church in Armagh, which had preeminence in Ireland.
- Mugdorna, or Crích Mughdornd, based in County Monaghan (Cremorne barony), however by the 12th-century had settled the territory of Bairrche, located in southern County Down, and named it after themselves. Their name lives on as "Mourne", the present-day name for the area and the Mourne Mountains.
- Fir Chraíbe, also known as the Fir na Chraíbe, meaning "men of the branch". They were located west of the River Bann in north-eastern County Londonderry. By the 9th century they were a subject-people of the Cenél nEógain.
- Fir Lí, also known as the Fir Lee, meaning "people of Lí". They were located west of the River Bann in mid-eastern County Londonderry. By the 9th century they were a subject-people of the Cenél nEógain.

=== Uí Moccu Úais ===
The Uí Tuirtri, Uí Maic Cairthinn, and Uí Fiachrach Arda Sratha, were collectively known as the Uí Moccu Úais as they claimed descent from Colla Uais. The pedigrees in the Book of Leinster states that Colla Uais had two sons, Erc and Fiachra Tort. From Fiachra Tort came the Uí Tuirtri. From Erc, came Cairthend and Fiachrach, who were respectively the ancestors of the Uí Maic Cairthinn and the Uí Fiachrach Arda Sratha. The Fir Lí are also claimed as being descended from Fiachra Tort, though other sources claim they descend from another son of Colla Uais called Faradach.

The Uí Moccu Uais were also found in counties Meath and Westmeath. They were known as Uí Moccu Uais Midi and Uí Moccu Uais Breg, meaning the Uí Moccu Uais of Meath and Brega, respectively.

== List of kings ==
- Crimthann Liath mac Fiach (5th Century)
- Fergus Cennfhada mac Crimthann Liath (5th Century)
- Colga mac Loite mac Cruinn, died 513
- Cairpre Daim Argat, died 514
- Daimine Daim Argat, died 565
- Conall Derg mac Daimine
- Bec mac Cuanu, died 594
- Aed mac Colgan, died 606
- Mael Odhar Macha, died 636
- Dunchad mac Ultan, died 677?
- Mael Fothartaig mac Mael Dubh, alive 697
- Cu Masach mac Cathal, died 825
- Gofraidh mac Fearghus, fl. 835
- Foghartaigh mac Mael Breasal, died 850/852
- Congalach mac Finnachta, died 874
- Mael Padraig mac Mael Curarada, died 882
- Maol Craoibh ua Duibh Sionach, died 917
- Fogarthach mac Donnegan, died 947
- Egneach mac Dalach, died 961
- Donnacan mac Maelmuire, died 970
- Mac Eiccnigh mac Dalagh, died 998
- Mac Leiginn mac Cerbaill, died 1022
- Cathalan Ua Crichain, died 1027
- Gilla Coluim ua Eichnech, died 1048
- Leathlobair Ua Laidhgnen, died 1053
- Leathlobair Ua Laidhgnen, died 1078
- Aodh Ua Baoigheallain, died 1093
- Ua Ainbhigh, died 1094
- Cu Caishil Ua Cerbaill, died 1101
- Giolla Crist Ua hEiccnigh, died 1127
- Donnchadh Ua Cearbaill, 1130–1168/1169
- Murchard Ua Cerbaill, 1168–1189
- Muirchertach, 1189–1194
- ?, died 1196
- Ua Eichnigh, died 1201
- Giolla Pádraig Ó hAnluain, 1201–1243

=== Mac Mathghamhna chiefs, 1243–1590 ===
- Eochaid mac Mathgahamna mac Neill, died 1273
- Brian mac Eochada, 1283–1311
- Ralph/Roolb mac Eochada, 1311–1314
- Mael Sechlainn mac Eochada, 1314–?
- Murchad Mór mac Briain, ?–1331
- Seoan mac Maoilsheachlainn, 1331–1342
- Aodh mac Roolb, 1342–1344
- Murchadh Óg mac Murchada, 1344–1344
- Maghnus mac Eochadha, 1344–1357
- Pilib mac Rooilbh, 1357–1362
- Brian Mór mac Aodh, 1362–1365
- Niall mac Murchadha, 1365–1368
- Brian Mór mac Aodh, 1368–1371
- Pilib Ruadh mac Briain, 1371–1403
- Ardghal mac Briain, 1403–February 1416
- Brian mac Ardghail, 1416–1442
- Ruaidhri mac Ardghail, 1442–1446
- Aodh Ruadh mac Ruaidhri, 1446–31 March 1453
- Feidhlimidh mac Briain, 1453–1466
- Eochan mac Ruaidhri, 1466–1467
- Reamonn mac Ruaidhri, 1467–November 1484
- Aodh Óg mac Aodha Ruaidh, 1485–16 September 1496
- Brian mac Reamoinn, 1496–1497
- Rossa mac Maghnusa, 1497–1513
- Reamonn mac Glaisne, 1513–c.1 April 1521
- Glaisne Óg mac Reamoinn, 1521–1551?
- Art Maol mac Reamoinn, 1551–1560
- Aodh mac Briain, 1560–1562
- Art Ruadh mac Briain, 1562–1578
- Sir Rossa Buidhe mac Airt, 1579–August 1589
- Hugh Roe McMahon (Irish: Aodh Ruadh mac Airt), 1589–September/October 1590.

== See also ==
- Ulaid
- Ailech
- John Foster, 1st Baron Oriel

== Bibliography ==
=== Bibliography ===
- Connolly, S.J., ed. (2007). Oxford Companion to Irish History. Oxford University Press. ISBN 978-0-19-923483-7.
- Cosgrove, Art, ed. (2008). A New History of Ireland, II Medieval Ireland 1169-1534. Oxford University Press. ISBN 978-019-953970-3.
- Duffy, Seán (2005). Medieval Ireland an Encyclopedia. Routledge. ISBN 978-0-4159-4052-8.
- MacCaffrey, Wallace T (1994). Elizabeth I: War and Politics, 1588-1603. Princeton University Press. ISBN 0691036519.
- Morgan, Hiram (1999). Tyrone's Rebellion: The Outbreak of the Nine Years War in Tudor Ireland. Boydell & Brewer. ISBN 0851156835.
- Palmer, William (1994). The Problem of Ireland in Tudor Foreign Policy, 1485-1603. Boydell & Brewer. ISBN 0851155626.
- Smith, Brendan (1999). "The Ua Cerbaill kingdom of Airgialla". Colonisation and Conquest in Medieval Ireland. Cambridge University Press.
- Warner, R. (1973–1974). "The Re-Provenancing of Two Important Penannular Brooches of the Viking Period". Ulster Journal of Archaeology. Third Series. 36–37. Ulster Archaeological Society: 58–70.
- MacMahons of Oriel: Mac Mathghamna, Kings of Oirghialla to 1590, in A New History of Ireland, pp. 215–16, volume IX, ed. Byrne, Martin, Moody. Dublin, 1984.
- The "Airgialla Charter Poem", Ailbhe Mac Shamhrain and Paul Byrne, in The Kingship and Landscape of Tara, Edel Bhreathnach, pp. 213–224, Four Courts Press, Dublin, 2005.
