= Coningsby Hospital =

Coordinates: 52.060276°N 2.714529°W

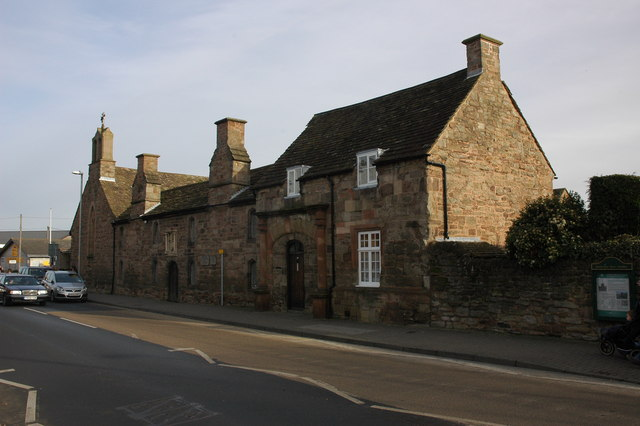
- The front view of the Coningsby Hospital, Widemarsh St, Hereford.

- Location within Herefordshire
- Location: Hereford, Herefordshire, England

History
- Built: 1614

Listed Building – Grade II*

Coningsby Hospital is a collection of almshouses in Hereford, Herefordshire. The site also contains a museum.

== History ==
In 1614 Thomas Coningsby converted what had originally been the conventual buildings of the Blackfriars Monastery and the preceptory of the Knights of St John of Jerusalem to a hospital for old soldiers and serving men.

The hospital consisted of 12 cottages on the site, a chapel, a refectory and offices. The chapel was restored in 1868.

Coningsby made rules that required a chaplain to preach a sermon and march the pensioners to Hereford Cathedral every Sunday. Funds to support the pensioners and the working of the hospital came from a charge on the Hampton Court estate.

The Coningsby pensioners wore a uniform of red coats leading to the legend that Nell Gwynne chose red coats for Chelsea Pensioners because she remembered the Coningsby pensioners from her childhood in Hereford.

The communal living area was converted to a museum in the 1970s. During the work a skeleton was found at the site. Initially thought to be a monk of the Blackfriars, analysis of the bones in 2007 revealed the remains may have been that of a woman. The bones have remained on public display in its grave under the floor.

== Current use ==
The Coningsbury's Hospital charity manages almhouses for "former members of HM's forces or for those who have undertaken substantial service for the local community within the counties of Herefordshire, Worcestershire or Salop".

The St John Medieval Museum and Coningsby Hospital is a popular visitor attraction.
