= Achaidh Leithdeircc =

Ancient location in Ireland

Battle of Achadh Leith-dheirg
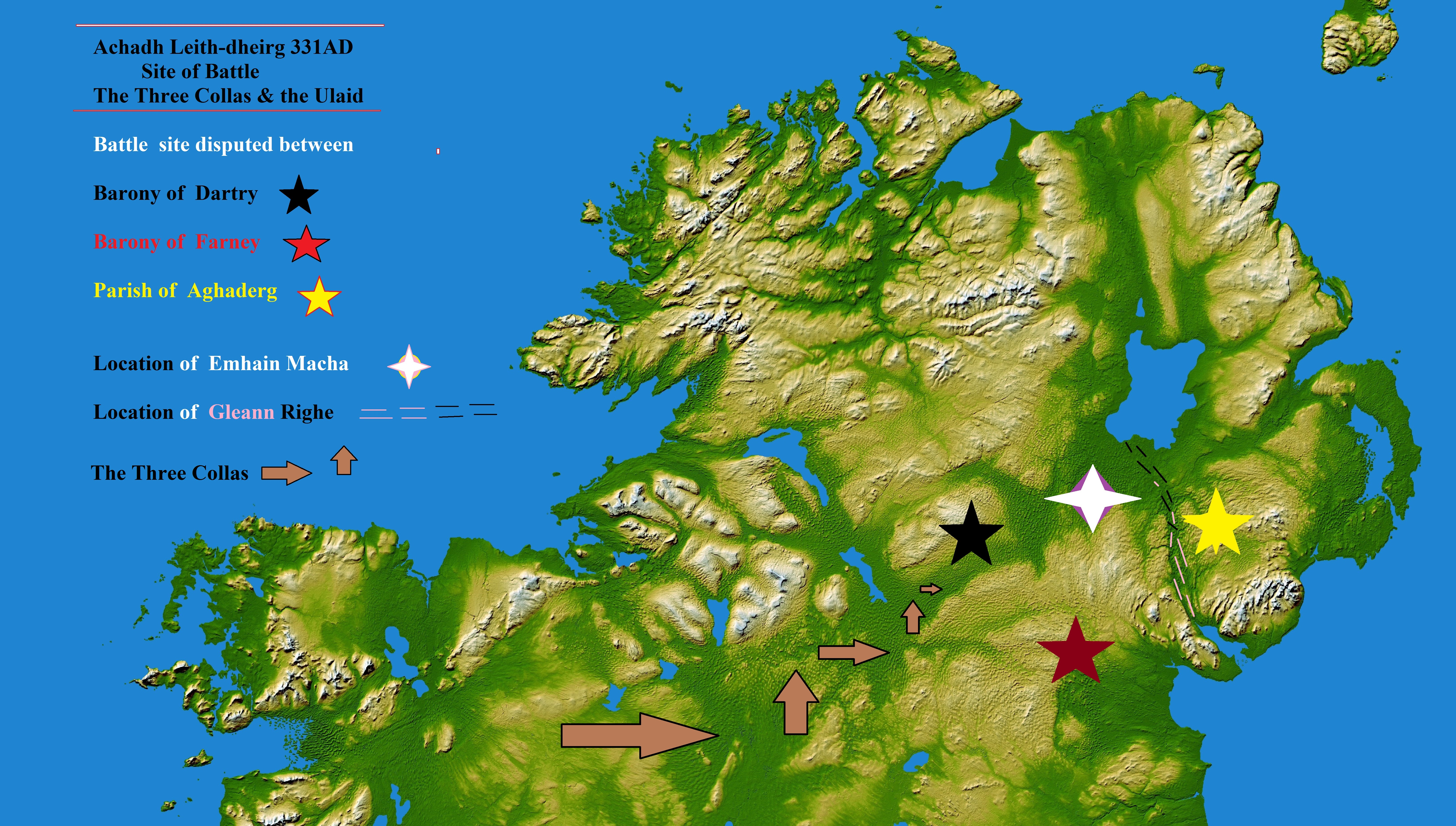
- Battle site 331 AD of the Three Collas & the Ulaid. Site of battle disputed between the three locations marked.
Date	331
Location	Fearn-mhagh
Result	Three Collas victory

Belligerents
The Ulaid	The Three Collas

Commanders and leaders
King Fearghus Fogha	Colla Meann, Colla Uais, Colla Da Crioch
- Battle site disputed between: Aghaderg parish - Barony of Dartree - Barony of Farney.

Achaidh Leithdeircc (modern spelling Achadh Leith-dheirg) is an ancient location in Ireland reputed to be the site of a historic battle, or series of battles, around the year 331 AD, in which the forces of the Three Collas along with men of Connaught eventually conquered vast tracts of territory from the tribes of the Ulaid. The prehistoric royal site of Navan Fort was burnt and plundered and ultimately this territory would re-emerge as part of the kingdom or federation of Airgíalla.

The Battle of Achadh Leith-dheirg was fought in the territory of "Fearnmhagh", according to 19th-century Celtic scholar John O'Donovan. The place of the battle has been disputed between Fearn-mhagh, County Monaghan and Aghaderg, near Loughbrickland, County Down.

== Sources for the Battle of Achadh Leith-dheirg ==
The 17th-century historian Geoffrey Keating in his "History of Ireland", in a stylized narrative of events, states:

The Collas and the Connaughtmen... marched to the Carn of Achadh leth-derg, in Fernmagh. From that hill, they fought seven battles against the Ulstermen, that is, a battle on each day during a whole week. Six of these battles were fought by the Connaughtmen and the seventh by the Collas. In it Fergus Fogha, King of Emhain, was slain, and the Ulstermen were finally routed. They were then pursued with great slaughter, from the Carn of Eocaidh to Glen Righe. From that latter place, the Collas marched back upon Emhain, which they plundered, and then burned, so that Emhain has remained without a king to inhabit it.

The Annals of the Four Masters, in the 19th-century translation by John O'Donovan, in a more perfunctory manner states: "The age of Christ 331. The battle of Achadh-leithdheirg, in Fearmhagh, [was fought] by the three Collas against the Ulstermen".... and in a note adds, "This place, situated in the territory of Fearnmagh, now the barony of Farney, in the county of Monaghan, has not been identified."

A footnote in Lebor na gCeart, published by the Celtic Society in 1847, contains a more expansive commentary regarding the location of Achadh Leith-dheirg:

This battle was fought AD332. The place is mentioned by Tigernach of Clones as situate in that part of the country of Oirghialla called Fearn-mhagh, the now barony of Farney, in the county of Monaghan. The Editor, when he visited the county of Down several years ago since, thought that it might be Aghaderg near Lough-brickland but he has been long since convinced that this is an error, in as much as Fearnmghagh is unquestionably the present barony of Farney in the county of Monaghan, and the parish of Aghderg, i.e. the red ford, is in the country into which the ancient Ultonians were driven, and of which they retained possession. The battle was fought many miles to the west of Gleann Righe, which is the vale of the Newry river beyond which the Ultonians were driven; and it is remarked in the accounts of the battle of Achadh-leithdeirg, that they never extended their kingdom beyond it, for a definite boundary was formed on this side of Gleann Righe, from Newry upwards [i.e. north wards).

The facts that emerge from any review of the battle are that the Three Collas were victorious in the battle(s) of Achadh Leith-dheirg in "Fearn-mhagh" and that they drove the Ulaid beyond the Glen Righe. The Three Collas took from the Ulaid the land west of Glen Righe and Loch nEathach (Lough Neagh). At the Glen Righe, the Three Collas stopped and returned westwards to destroy Emhain Macha. The Three Collas did not invade or ever hold the land east/beyond the formidable boundary of the Glen Righe. Also, the "Carn of Achadh leth-derg" may not have been the battle site, but rather the encampment of the Three Collas.

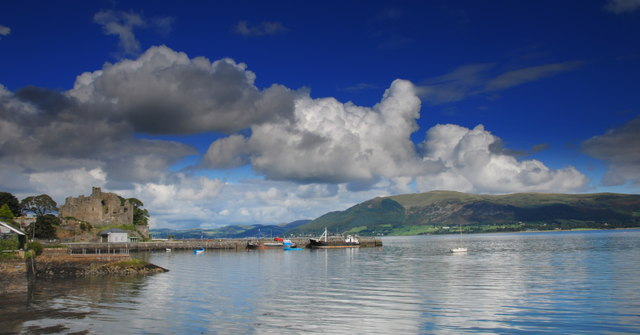
King John's Castle - Carlingford lough - where the Glen Righe enters the Irish sea

== The Glen Righe: The King's valley ==
When the last great ice caps started receding northwards some ten thousand years ago, Ireland arose once more from a frozen slumber. Great torrents of water were released by the melting ice. Lough Neagh slowly shrugged off vast quantities of this meltwater by flooding the surrounding lowlands. Watercourses which are now merely streams were then voluminous torrents, gushing across the land.

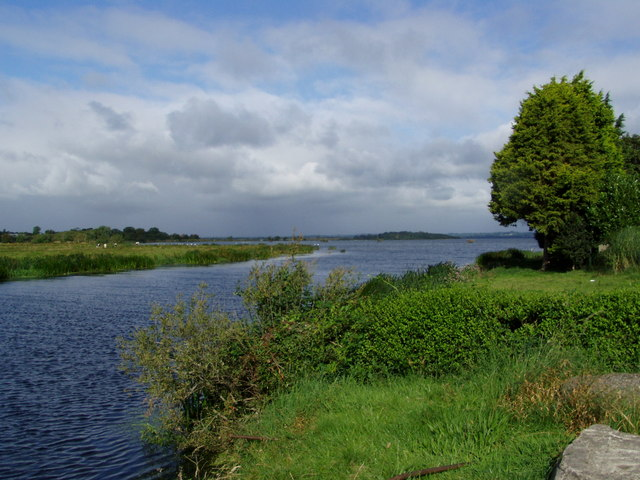
Upper River Bann enters lough Neagh at the northern end of Glen Righe

However between nineteen and thirteen thousand years before the present, during the last glacial period, the ice sheets flowed from Lough Neagh in a south-easterly direction. They eroded the under lying bedrock over which they travelled, dramatically reshaping the landscape into U-shaped valleys and cirques. When eventually the last ice caps receded the torrential meltwaters poured into the contoured land, adding to the swollen rivers.

Between the mouth or flood plain of the upper River Bann, where it flows into Lough Neagh and the fjord of Carlingford Lough where the River Clanrye empties into the Irish sea, lies one such u-shaped valley - the Glen Righe - an Gleann Righe.

This immense valley of bog, lough and river would become a natural land boundary for centuries. It would become the dividing line in 331 AD after the battle of Achadh Leith-dheirg between the new conquerors - the Three Collas and the remaining lands of the Ulaid. It would become in the seventeenth century the dividing line between the newly formed County Armagh and County Down and in the eighteenth century it would become the naturally occurring route of the Newry Canal.

== Aghaderg Parish, County Down ==
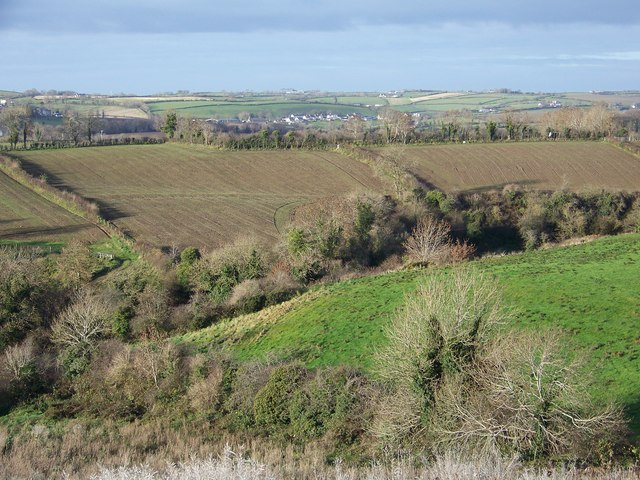
Drumsallagh - Aghaderg parish

Aghaderg is a civil parish mainly in the Barony of Iveagh Upper, Upper Half and partly within the Barony of Iveagh Lower, Lower Half in the County Down, Province of Ulster. Within the bounds of Aghaderg parish are the remains of many sites of great archaeological interest, from stone circles to hill-top forts and settlements along river valleys. These sites include Lisnagade Hillfort, the Three Sisters ancient standing stones at Greenan, and parts of the Black Pig's Dyke. Aghaderg Parish lies within a drumlin belt landscape and encompasses the historic settlements of Loughbrickland and Scarva where King William III encamped. The village of Loughbrickland is renowned for its ancient crannog.

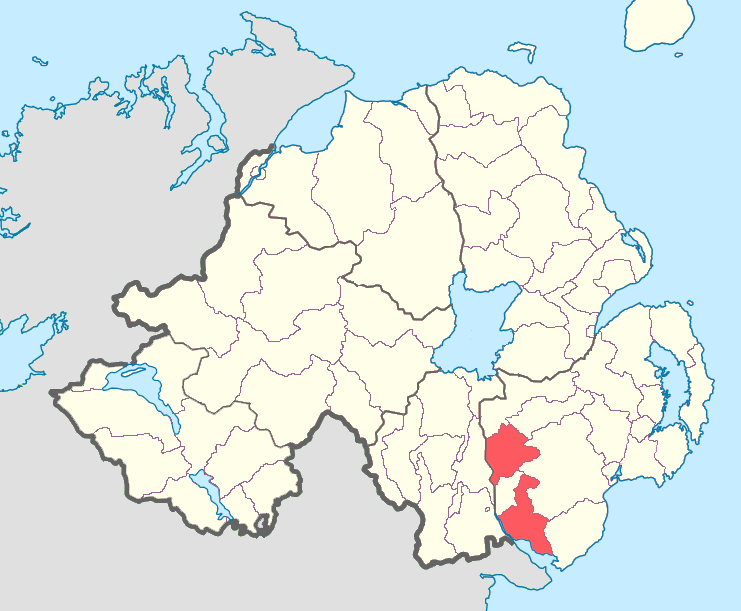
Iveagh-Upper:Upper barony

Aghaderg Parish is bounded on the west and separated from county Armagh by the Newry Canal – which follows the path of the u-shaped valley from the mouth of upper River Bann at Lough Neagh to Carlingford Lough, known as the Glen Righe. This great, swampy valley remained an almost impenetrable boundary for many centuries, however it did permit a seasonal though highly precarious route across at specific "passes". These passes, in later years would become known as: Poyntzpass, Scarva pass, Jerrettspass, and Terryhoogan pass. These passes, though treacherous, seasonal and highly demanding may have allowed access to an invading army approaching from the west.

The two earliest recorded forms of the name Aghaderg - "Uchderc", concerning the site of a battle in AD 1147, between the Ulaid and Cenél nEógain allied with Airgíalla, remain questionable. The indigenous explanation around the early eighteenth century for the name of the parish implicates the old church of Drumsallagh, County Down. Local tradition told that numerous holy men had been killed by the Danes, who destroyed the church and monastery, and that afterwards this place became called Aghdurg, ‘the red or bloody ford’ - the boundary stream running close by the site.

Most early spellings of Aghaderg have a vowel after Agh-, suggesting achadh - ‘field’ rather than ucht - ‘hill-breast’ or áth ‘ford’. According to Placenamesni.org "The second element is probably dearg ‘red’, and the final syllable appearing as -rig in some forms up to 1834 could be explained as the epenthetic vowel pronounced in Irish between the r and g of dearg. Thus the name would be Achadh Dearg ‘red field’, the Irish form given in the 17th century (LCAB)."

== Barony of Dartree & Barony of Farney, County Monaghan ==
The battle was fought in Farney in 331 AD according to the Annals of the Four Masters. In later sections of the Annals, Farney is spelt 'Fernmaighe' in the Gaelic language and 'Fearnmaighe' in the English translation.

Two baronies of county Monaghan, whose histories are deeply entangled, lay claim to "Farney", namely Dartree and Farney.

The present county of Monaghan, in the early medieval era was part of the more extensive kingdom of Mugdorna - the tribe of Mugdornai: from which the barony of Cremorne derives its name. In this period Fernmhagh was centred in north west Monaghan around Loch Uaithne - Lough Ooney.

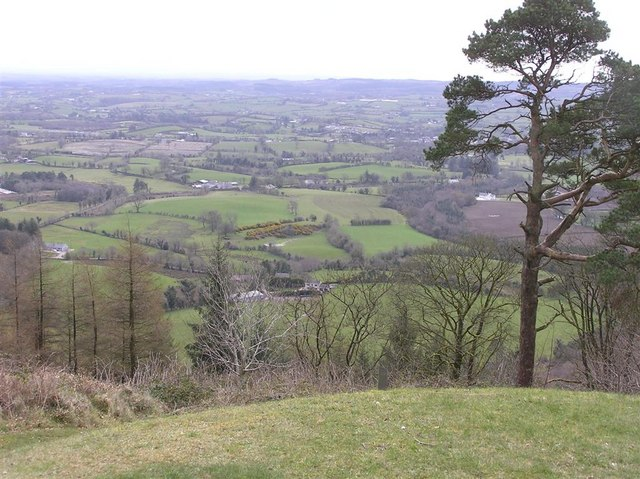
Knockmany Hill - overlooking the Clogher valley

The Annals of the Four Masters (for the year 849) say that "Caireall, son of Ruadhrach, lord of Lough Uaithne, was slain by the Conaille." A footnote by O'Donovan describes Lough Ooney as follows:

Loch Uaithne: i.e. Uaithne's Lough, now Lough Ooney, situated near the village of Smithborough, in the barony of Dartry and County of Monaghan. The chief of Dartraighe-Coininse had his principal residence at this lake, and hence was sometimes called lord of Loch-Uaithne.

Peadar Livingstone, in The Monaghan Story, states

Lough Ooney [was] undoubtedly the most important centre in the story of early Christian settlement in west Monaghan. On the eastern shore of this lake are the crannógs which formed the centre of the ancient ríocht or kingdom of Dartraighe-Coninse, from which the later barony of Dartrey, including the district of Connons, takes its name.

— Livingstone, The Monaghan Story, p. 38

Also from the same publication

While still at Lough Ooney, the Ua Nadsluaig has been known as the Fir Fernmaige and their kings as kings of Fernmaig, or Farney. When they migrated, they brought this name with them and eventually gave it to part of the area where they settled. As a result, the barony of Farney is today in south Monaghan, many kilometers from where the name began.

— Livingstone, The Monaghan Story, p. 41

Livingstone further states:

The County's most celebrated crannog [man-made island] was at Lough Ooney, near Smithborough. This particular crannog seems to have been the headquarters of the Fir Fernmaige for many centuries. It is mentioned in the Annals of Ulster as early as 719.

— Livingstone, The Monaghan Story, p. 35

The preserving of a name that formerly belonged to another place is an occurrence frequent in Irish topography.

Twelfth century expansion and migration

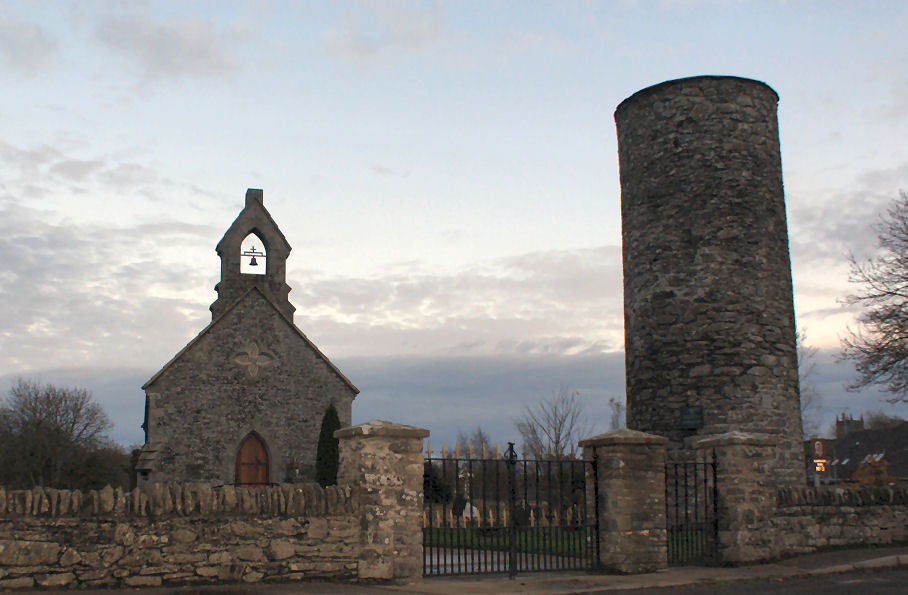
Inniskeen round tower, Monaghan

By the late 11th century the airgillia kingdom of Ui Chremthainn was controlled by the leading family of the Fir Fernmaige, using the surname of Ua Cerbaill. Due to Cenél nEógain pressure the Ui Chremthainn power base which had centred on Clogher was shifting south west into Monaghan. By early in the twelfth century the Ua Cerbhaill under the powerful political and religious reformer - King Donnchadh ua Cerbhaill controlled the ancient lands of the mugdornai. Donnchadh ua Cerbhaill (O'Carroll) endowed the establishment of Mellifont Abbey and under his kingship the airgillia federation would play an immense role in twelfth century developments in Ireland.

As the twelfth century progressed the Ua Cherbaill expansion continued south easterly and their power base shifted from Clogher. Contemporary with this shift may have been the relocation of the ~ "Fir Fernmaighe" - Farney, from their original historically associated location of Lough Uaithne/Ooney into the south east region of modern Monaghan which now is known as the barony of Farney.

The Dioceses established at the Synod of Ráth Breasail laid sold foundation for church establishment but many changes had occurred in the decades following as ua Cherbhaill expansion continued into County Louth, Donnchadh ua Cerbhaill instigated the bishop of Louth or Airgillia, while that of the Bishop of Clogher temporarily fell into disuse.

== After the battle - The disputed Sites ==
Aghaderg history after the battle

The territory that encompassed Aghaderg parish in the centuries after the battle would evolve as the Ulaid fellowship of the Uí Echach Cobo. The territory lying directly west - as that of the Airghialla federation. To the north lay the lands of Dál nAraidi. While to the east the Dál Fiatach held sway.

Modern county Monaghan baronies

In the "Collectanea de rebus hibernicis", (1770) the baronies of Monaghan are noted as: "Dartry, Monaghan, Cremorne, Trough, Donamayne." The modern barony of Farney was titled as Donamayne. The barony of Farney is not recorded in " civil and ecclesiastical topography >"(1806): instead it is referenced as - "Donaghmoyne". Again in "A Topographical Dictionary of Ireland"(1810) Donaghmoyne is listed as occupying barony. The barony of Farney appears, by at least 1833, in Gortons "Topographical Dictionary of Ireland"

Dartree and Farney history after the battle

The territory surrounding these locations would become known as Oriel; a highly important federation of the Airgilla. In the centuries that followed the battle, the territory to the north-west of Airgialla would belong to the Cenél nEógain, the territory east of Airgialla - to the Ulaid, to the south lay the lands of the southern Uí Néill, while to the south west lay the Uí Briúin of Brefnie.

== Achaidh Leith-dheirg - In the Valley of the Black Pig's Dyke ==
In the barony of Dartree, county Monaghan, some five miles south of Clones lies the parish of Currin: through which runs a six-mile remnant of the ancient Black Pig's Dyke or "worm ditch". This prehistoric fortification of raised earthworks and palisades, on south facing inclines of drumlin hills, has long been regarded as a defensive formation and territorial border. This section of the Black Pig's Dyke is roughly eight miles south of loch Uaithne/Ooney the ancient capital of Fernmhagh.

At the battle of Achaidh Leith-dheirg the forces of the Three Collas had to breach the defences of the Ulaid and this breakthrough must have occurred somewhere along the Fernmhagh-Ulaid border: along the Black Pig's Dyke. Again this advance of the Three Collas would logically occur at the weakest point of the defence line. One example of which is - an ancient highway. According to Colm Ó Lochlainn an ancient road from Ulster ran south from Tullyhogue Fort and Clogher; then through the Black Pig's Dyke, branching near Cornapaste (townland) Currin parish and on to Belturbet, Ballyconnell and so to Connaught in the west of Ireland.

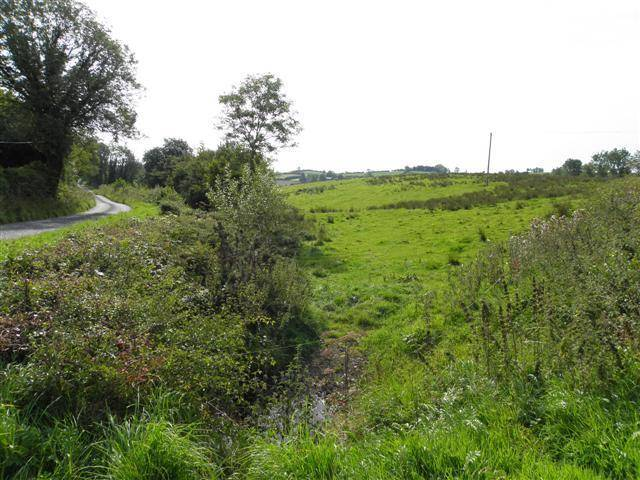
Aghareagh townland

The Black Pig's Dyke/Worm Ditch runs for roughly six miles west–east through Currin parish. Starting at the River Finn its course can be traced across drumlins and loughs until it disappears into a bog near magherashaghry fort on the river Bunnoe. At a point where the townlands of Aghareagh West and Corrinary meet the earthworks curves into a slight valley before turning abruptly north for some one hundred metres, then continuing east.

The etymology of the townland name of Corrinary would equate to: corr = a round hill, faraire = a watchman. This may have been the weakest point of the earthworks; a pass in the valley allowing an ancient road, watched over by warriors. In the Onomasticon Goedelicum mention is made of a placename in Ulster described as Currach leithdeirg - "the red bog". In the townland of Corrinary lies a swamp known locally as - "the red bog". Through this weak point in the earthworks defence the army of the Three Collas may have made their breakthrough.

The Ulaid would no doubt have been aware of the advance of the Three Collas and although unable to stem the breakthrough at Corrinary, they would have mustered their forces at a very close and advantageous location. Some half mile due north of the townland of Corrinary there lies a tapestry landscape of interwoven plains, drumlins and steep hills, in a townland called Carnroe-Carn Rua. Rua and Derg have much the same meaning = Red. On the top of Carnroe are the remains of "Giants Graves": traditionally the burial grounds of fallen leaders.

"The Collas and the Connaughtmen... marched to the Carn of Achadh leth-derg, in Fernmagh. From that hill, they fought seven battles against the Ulstermen." (Keating)

The Collas and the Connaughtmen...marched to the hill of the red field - Carnroe - in Dartree. From that hill, they fought seven battles against the Ulstermen. (Perhaps.)

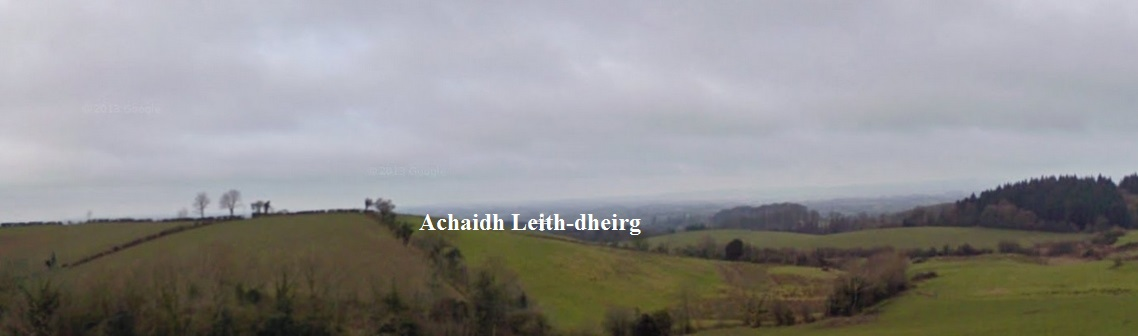
Achaaidh Leith dheirg - battle site
