= Blackfriars, Hereford =

Historic ruins in Herefordshire, England

Blackfriars Priory
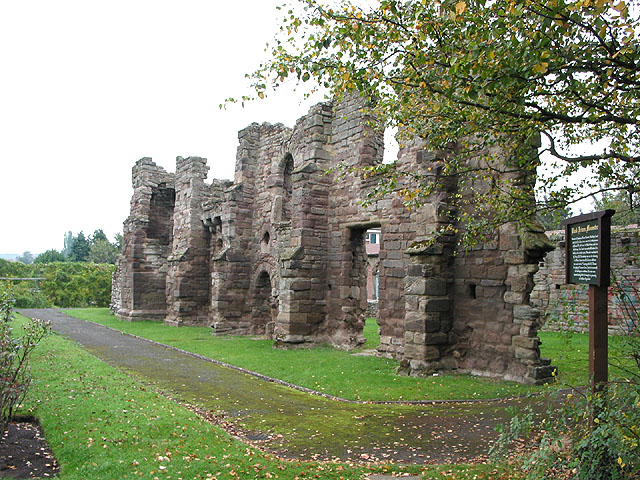
- Ruins of Hereford Blackfriars

- Location within Herefordshire
- 52.060°N 2.713°W
- Periods: Medieval

Scheduled monument
- Official name: Blackfriars Priory
- Designated: 26 November 1928
- Reference no.: 1010797

Blackfriars Priory was a medieval Dominican priory established in the thirteenth century. The remains of the priory, located in Hereford, England, consist of monastery ruins, a cemetery, and a stone preaching cross. The ruins are surrounded by a rose garden established by the local community in 1964.

== Description ==
Blackfriars priory is located on Widemarsh Street in Hereford, England at grid reference SO51184043. The site includes the remains of a Dominican refectory, prior's house, part of the original cloister walls, a stone preaching cross, and a cemetery.

== History ==
The Friars Preachers or Blackfriars arrived in Hereford sometime before 1246 after having been founded in 1215 and establishing an English province in 1221. Multiple parcels of land were granted to the Blackfriars by John Daniel, Bishop Orleton and Edward II. Edward III was reported to be present at the dedication of the church. The priory, located in the parish of St. John, Hereford, was established in 1322 when a chapel and monastic buildings were built. A stone preaching cross and cemetery were added later.

The priory was demolished in 1538 during the Dissolution of the Monasteries. What remained after 1538 were the buildings in the monastery's west range and the fourteenth century Preaching Cross. The monastic land was purchased by John Scudamore (died 1571), and later acquired by Thomas Coningsby. Coningsby combined some of the remaining buildings with the nearby buildings of the Order of St John to create the Coningsby Hospital.

The site was excavated in 1958, and the findings established the location of the cloister walls and the nave of the church. It also established that the priory consisted of a gatehouse, a variety of domestic buildings and separate apartments, adjacent to gardens and orchards. The cemetery is located to the west of the priory and includes a 14th-century stone preaching cross, which was restored in 1864.

== Blackfriars rose garden ==
The first garden beds in the Rose Gardens were planted in March 1964, a gift to the City of Hereford from the Hereford and the West of England Rose Society to mark its centenary. Over the years, a total of 28 rose beds were planted. The rose gardens are being revived in a five-year programme of replanting and tending by volunteers from the community – the Friends of Blackfriars Rose Gardens.
