= William FitzWilliam (Lord Deputy) =

English Lord Deputy of Ireland

Lord Deputy of Ireland

Personal details
- Born: 1526 Milton Hall, Northamptonshire, England
- Died: 22 June 1599 (aged ~73) Milton Hall, Northamptonshire, England
- Children: 5, including Philippa

Sir William FitzWilliam (1526 – 22 June 1599) was an English statesman who served as Lord Justice of Ireland and afterwards Lord Deputy of Ireland. In 1587, as Governor of Fotheringhay Castle, he supervised the execution of the death sentence on Mary, Queen of Scots. He was the member of parliament for Peterborough and represented County Carlow in the Irish House of Commons. He lived at Gainspark, Essex, and Milton Hall. He has been noted for his corruption during his final term as Lord Deputy, which enabled the Irish confederacy during the early years of the Nine Years' War.

== Early life ==
FitzWilliam was born at Milton Hall, Northamptonshire, the eldest son of Sir William (died 1576) and Anne Sapcote, daughter of Sir Richard Sapcote of Elton, and grandson of William Fitzwilliam, Sheriff of London, who had been treasurer and chamberlain to Cardinal Wolsey and purchased Milton Hall in 1506. On his mother's side FitzWilliam was related to the Earl of Bedford, to whom he owed his introduction to King Edward VI.

== Family ==
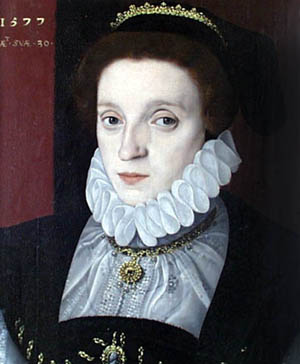
FitzWilliam's wife Lady Anne Sidney, 1577

In 1543, FitzWilliam married Anne (Agnes) Sidney (d. 1602), daughter of Sir William Sidney of Penshurst Place. She was the sister of Frances Radclyffe, Countess of Sussex, who founded Sidney Sussex College, Cambridge. Her brother, Sir Henry Sidney, was married to Lady Mary Dudley and they were the parents of Mary Sidney, Sir Philip Sidney and Robert Sidney, 1st Earl of Leicester. Her brothers-in-law included Sir William Dormer, Sir James Harington and Thomas Radclyffe, 3rd Earl of Sussex. The Fitzwilliams were the parents of five children:

- Sir William Fitzwilliam (died 1618), of Gainspark and Milton Hall. He was MP for Peterborough in 1571, 1584 and 1586. He married Winnifred, daughter of Sir Walter Mildmay and niece of Sir Francis Walsingham. Their son, William, was created the 1st Baron FitzWilliam, 1620.
- John Fitzwilliam (1554–1612)
- Anne Fitzwilliam
- Phillipa Fitzwilliam, married Sir Thomas Coningsby, of Hampton Court, Herefordshire. They were the parents of Fitzwilliam Coningsby.
- Mary Fitzwilliam (died 1601), married Sir Richard Dyer of Great Staughton.

== Member of Parliament ==
He was elected MP for Peterborough in October 1553, 1559 and replaced the deceased existing member in 1581.

== Irish career ==
In 1559 FitzWilliam was appointed Vice-Treasurer of Ireland and elected a member of the Irish House of Commons to represent County Carlow. His conduct as treasurer provoked allegations of corruption against him and, although these were never proven, they dogged him throughout his career. Between 1559 and 1571 he served five times as Lord Justice of Ireland (during the absences of the Earl of Sussex, and of his successor, Sir Henry Sidney). In 1571 he was appointed to the office of Lord Deputy itself, but like Queen Elizabeth's other servants he received scant and infrequent allotments from the Treasury. His government was thus marked by penury and its attendant evils, inefficiency, mutiny and general lawlessness.

FitzWilliam quarrelled bitterly with the Lord President of Connaught, Sir Edward Fitton (1527–1579), but he did manage to compel the troublesome Earl of Desmond into submission in 1574. He disliked the colonial expedition in Ulster of the Earl of Essex, and then had a further quarrel with Fitton. After a serious illness, he was allowed to resign his office.

After his return to England in 1575, FitzWilliam was appointed governor of Fotheringhay Castle, where he supervised the execution of the death sentence on Mary, Queen of Scots. She is said to have given him a portrait of her son James VI which she had hanging on her bed head.

== Final tour in Ireland ==
In 1588 FitzWilliam was again in Ireland as Lord Deputy, and although old and ill he displayed great activity in leading expeditions, and found time to quarrel with Sir Richard Bingham (1528–1599), the new President of Connaught. He relied heavily on the Lord Chief Justice of Ireland, Sir Robert Gardiner, and refused his pleas to be allowed to retire on health grounds, saying that Gardiner was so "wise, temperate and useful" that he could not be spared, in spite of his crushing workload.

His predecessor in office had been Sir John Perrot. FitzWilliam immediately seized on an opportunity to discredit him by giving countenance to the allegations by a renegade priest that Perrot had plotted with King Philip II of Spain to overthrow the Queen. The allegations were wild, but such was the momentum of criticism that came Perrot's way that he was convicted of treason at Westminster, and died while awaiting sentence of death in 1591.

FitzWilliam had pursued aggressive policies in Connaught and Ulster from the start. These policies upset the accommodations that had delivered an unusual peace to much of the island in the preceding years. In 1588 a large portion of the Spanish Armada was wrecked on the Irish coast, and FitzWilliam was responsible for ordering the executions of up to 2,000 survivors.

The Spanish threat was readily dealt with, and FitzWilliam turned up the pressure on those Ulster lords who owed their allegiance to the Earl of Tyrone. One of these lords, the MacMahon, was put to death by royal authority in Monaghan town in 1591, and it became clear that the Dublin government was set on thoroughly curbing the power of the Gaelic leaders of Ulster. Although Tyrone continued to display his loyalty to the crown, the course had been set for a showdown and he went into rebellion in 1595, at the start of the Nine Years' War.

In 1594 FitzWilliam left Ireland for good, and five years later he died at Milton Hall on 22 June 1599 after a long illness.

== Notes ==
Preceded by Sir Thomas Cusack (as Lord Chancellor)	Lord Chancellor of Ireland (as Lord Keeper); 1555	Succeeded by Archbishop Hugh Curwen (as Lord Chancellor)
Preceded by Lords Justices	Lord Deputy of Ireland; 1571–1575	Succeeded by Henry Sidney
Preceded by John Perrot	Lord Deputy of Ireland; 1588–1594	Succeeded by William Russell
