= Hugh Roe McMahon =

Irish nobleman (d. 1590)

Hugh Roe McMahon (Irish: Aodh Rua Mac Mathúna; died September/October 1590) was an Irish Gaelic nobleman and Lord of Monaghan who reigned over Airgíalla from 1589 until his execution in 1590. He was from the McMahon clan of Oriel.

== Family background ==
He was the younger brother of Ross McMahon, the Chief of the Name McMahon. Upon Ross's death, two of his kinsman had claims to the chieftainship: Hugh Roe McMahon was supported by English law (per the surrender and regrant policy) and Brian McHugh Oge McMahon was supported by brehon law. The English Lord Deputy of Ireland, William FitzWilliam, planned to divide Monaghan between the claimants, preventing a potentially bloody succession dispute and also weakening the McMahon clan.

After Ross's death, Hugh Roe McMahon went to Dublin to claim his inheritance. A few days after arriving there, FitzWilliam had three other claimants summoned. FitzWilliam proposed dividing Monaghan four ways. McMahon objected violently, but was threatened with a charge of treason and so ultimately accepted.

== Death ==
Hugh Roe McMahon was sentenced to death in September 1590, after a questionable legal process, and hanged soon after, in what at least one source describes as an act of judicial murder.
