= Ham Castle =

Castle in Worcestershire, England

Ham (or Homme) Castle
- Clifton-upon-Teme, Worcestershire
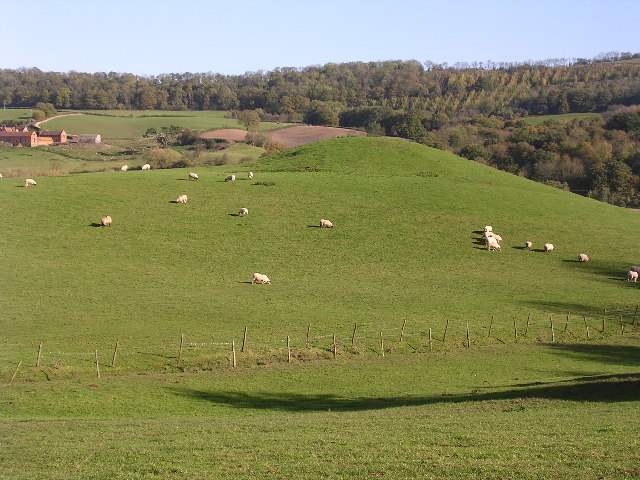
- Homme Castle mound, 2005

Site information
- Type: Motte and bailey
- Open to the public: Yes
- Condition: Earthworks only survive

Location
- Shown within Worcestershire.
- Coordinates: 52.25526°N 2.39001°W

Ham Castle (also known as Home or Homme Castle) is located in Worcestershire at the bottom of a wooded escarpment (and close to the River Teme), within the parish of Clifton-upon-Teme, about 1 mile (1.6 km) east of the village of Clifton-upon-Teme and 4 miles (6.4 km) south of Great Witley.

It was a medieval motte and bailey castle. A hoard of medieval gold and silver was found on the site in the 17th century. Only a mound now remains.

== Archaeology ==
The field in which the earthworks covering the remains of the medieval castle are located slopes from north to south. The motte (mound) is oval with a north-west/south-east orientation. It is about 56 metres (61 yd) long and about 40 metres (44 yd) wide at its widest point and it may have a rock outcrop in its core. It is surrounded by a 1 metre (3.3 ft) high platform. Because of the considerable slope in the field, the height of the motte compared to its immediate surroundings depends on which side is used. On the north side the motte is about 2 metres (6.6 ft) above the surrounding bailey while on the south side it is between 4.2 metres (14 ft) and 5.2 metres (17 ft) high. (Note: Different surveys have return different heights for the mound against the bailey although one estimated the height as 3 metres (9.8 ft) above the 1 metre (3.3 ft) high platform (see Historic England & 114209 and English Heritage WSM00284.)) The summit of the motte is flat, covered with grass and weeds with no visible footings. At the time of one survey (in 1974 or 1986) there had been a fire on the north and south-west of the summit of the motte and stones visible in this area.

The bailey on the south-west side is on a steep embankment (and so is probably not very extensive). The bailey on the north to the east sides rises steeply, while that on the north to west sides is flatter, but ploughing has over the years destroyed visible traces of the outer curtain wall and any internal structures. The traces of a double moat, fed from a spring and the Teme is visible and may have extended around the castle.

== History ==
Ham Castle Farm, in the north-east of the parish, near the Teme, is on the site of the ancient Ham Castle, which, from its commanding position, must at one time have been a stronghold of importance.

Historically, little is known of this castle, which is mentioned for the first time in 1207. It evidently belonged to the owners of the manor of Ham, but seems to have been forfeited for some reason by one of them and given with many of their other estates by King John to Thomas de Galweya. Thomas was ordered in 1207 to deliver the castle (castellum) to William de Cauntelow to keep during the King's pleasure.

No other direct reference to it has been found, apart from a legal record, in 1288, a plea of dower, mentioning a carucate of land in "Castel Homme", in Worcestershire.

It evidently followed the descent of the manor, but in 1275 and a hundred years later the dwelling at Ham is returned as a capital messuage. A stronghold of some kind seems, however, to have survived.

The rest of history of the site may refer to the location now occupied by Ham Castle Farm and its surrounds (some of which are grade II listed structures) that are located about 200 metres (220 yd) from the site of the earth works identified site of the medieval castle.

The house was partly burnt in 1605, and greatly injured during the Civil War. Tradition says it was besieged and much damaged by the Parliamentary army, whose cannonballs were long preserved there. A cannonball which was dug up on the bank opposite Ham Castle was in the possession of the vicar of Clifton in 1924.

The diary of Mistress Joyce Jeffreys, who took refuge there from the Parliamentary forces, contains various entries of fees paid for burying and digging up trunks and other property, according to the movements of the enemy. This upon one occasion seems to have led to the discovery by William Jeffreys, then owner of Ham Castle, of a chest containing "gold and silver and other kind of mettalls", buried in some long forgotten earlier alarm. The vault in which this chest was found was in the middle of "an ancient fort made in the fashion of a half moon".

From the same diary it appears that General Gilbert Gerrard, Governor of Worcester, came to Ham Castle on 12 July 1645 and left the next day.

Habington describes Ham Castle as "now ruinated". The 17th-century house which replaced the castle was burnt to the ground in 1887. The dates 1677 and 1680 with the Jeffreys arms on the hopper heads of the rain-water pipes in the large half-timbered mansion of Ham Castle, then destroyed, showed that rebuilding was done in those years by Henry Jeffreys. Though much defaced and altered before its final disappearance, the old house retained traces of ancient stateliness in its massive staircase, the oak bookshelves of the old library in the roof, and its beautiful garden terraces. On 1 March 1680 Henry Jeffreys paid 15s. hearth tax for fifteen hearths in his house at Ham Castle. The ruins at Ham Castle were reserved in a lease of 1759, and the castle is mentioned in conveyances of the manor in 1805 and 1810.

== See also ==
- Castles in Great Britain and Ireland
- List of castles in England
- Charles Nott, the parson of Shelsley Beauchamp, a neighbouring parish, was a leader of the Clubmen lived during the Civil War.
