= Clifton upon Teme =

Village in Worcestershire, England

Coordinates: 52.253°N 2.421°W

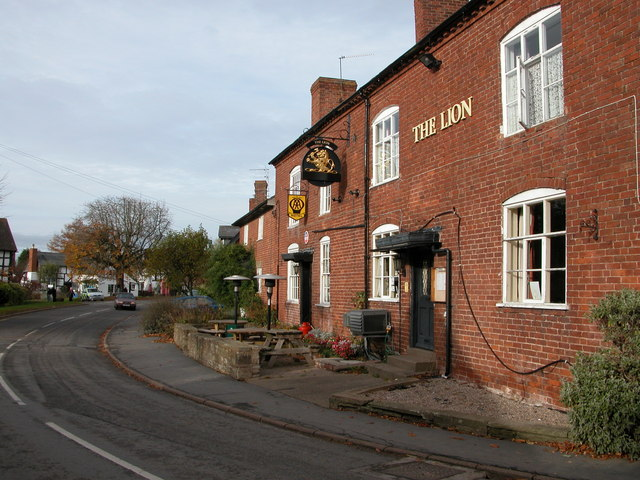

- Location within Worcestershire
- Population: 871 (2021 census)
- Civil parish: Clifton upon Teme
- District: Malvern Hills
- Shire county: Worcestershire
- Region: West Midlands
- Country: England
- Sovereign state: United Kingdom
- Post town: Worcester
- Postcode district: WR6
- Police: West Mercia
- Fire: Hereford and Worcester
- Ambulance: West Midlands

Clifton upon Teme is a village and civil parish in the Malvern Hills district in the county of Worcestershire, England. In 2021 the parish had a population of 871.

== Amenities ==
Named after the River Teme which runs nearby, it has a village shop, parish church (dedicated to Saint Kenelm), nursery and primary school, village hall, veterinary surgery, garage and two pubs, the New Inn and the Lion.

== Notable features ==
There are two grade II* buildings in Clifton upon Teme: the parish church of St Kenelm, and Woodmanton Farmhouse. and further 44 grade II listed buildings or structures. Located outside the village at the bottom of the escarpment (and close to the river Teme), but within the parish is Ham Castle Farm which is the location of three grade II listed buildings and one other grade II structure. Close to it are the earthworks remains of Ham Castle.

== History ==
The village is an excellent example of an Anglo-Saxon settlement overlooking the River Teme, situated on the ancient salt route that led from Droitwich to Leominster.

The earliest surviving mention of the village is in the Latin charter of King Athelstan, granting it to the monks of St. Peter's Monastery in Worcester in 934 AD when it was referred to as Clistun ultra Tame.

During the time of the wars with the Welsh, the manor of Clifton became established and was granted Royal Borough status by Edward III of England in 1377, allowing it to hold a weekly market on Thursdays and an annual four-day fair. The original manor house, built around 1200 on the site of the present Lion Inn, eventually came to be used as a hostelry for travellers en route between Worcester and Tenbury Wells.

Clifton-upon-Teme was in the upper division of Doddingtree Hundred.

Following the Poor Law Amendment Act 1834 Clifton-upon-Teme Parish ceased to be responsible for maintaining the poor in its parish. This responsibility was transferred to Martley Poor Law Union.
