= Knocks (Aghalurcher) =

Townland in County Fermanagh, Northern Ireland

Coordinates: 54.270°N 7.380°W

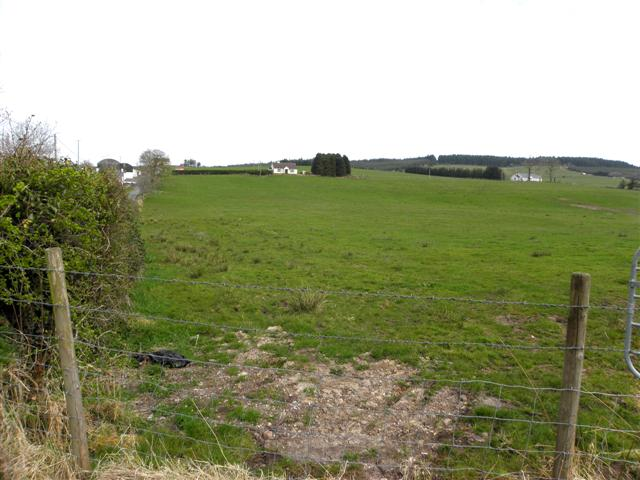
Knocks townland

Knocks (from Irish Cnoic 'hill') is a small townland to the east of Lisnaskea in County Fermanagh, Northern Ireland. It is situated in the historic barony of Magherastephana and the civil parish of Aghalurcher and covers an area of 193 acres (0.3 sq mi).

The name "The Knocks" is locally applied to a larger area around the townland. The area has a primary school, St. Eugene's, and a community centre.

Knocks is bordered by Bunlougher townland to the north, by Coalhill, Eshanummer and Eshnascreen to the west. On the eastern side, Knocks is bordered by Eshbane and Eshcarcoge, and to the south, it shares a boundary with Eshthomas townland.

== See also ==
- List of townlands in County Fermanagh
