= Monaghan (barony) =

Monaghan Muineachán (Irish)
- Barony
- Interactive map of Monaghan
- Sovereign state: Ireland
- County: Monaghan

Area
  - Total: 282.21 km^{2} (108.96 sq mi)

Monaghan (Irish: Muineachán) is a barony in County Monaghan, Ireland.

== Etymology ==
Monaghan barony takes its name from Monaghan town (Irish: Muineachán, "abounding in thickets").

== Location ==
Monaghan is found in central County Monaghan.

Monaghan barony is bordered to the north by Trough; to the southwest by Dartree; to the southeast by Cremorne (all the preceding are also in County Monaghan); to the east by Tiranny, County Armagh; and to the west by Magherastephana and Clankelly, County Fermanagh.

== History ==
The MacMahons were chiefs in medieval times.

== List of settlements ==
Below is a list of settlements in Monaghan barony:

- Ballinode
- Monaghan
- Scotstown
- Smithborough
