= St Comhghall's Secondary School =

Defunct Catholic school in Northern Ireland

Coordinates: 54.261°N 7.453°W

Information
- Motto: Pray and work together
- Religious affiliation: Roman Catholic
- Established: 1970
- Closed: 2017
- Age: 12 to 18
- Enrollment: 490
- Colors: navy blue; silver; white
- Website: www.stcomhghallscollege.co.uk

St. Comhghall's College was a Roman Catholic co-educational school providing secondary level education to pupils from age 12 to 18 years. The school was situated outside Lisnaskea, a small town in County Fermanagh, Northern Ireland. The college opened in September 1970.

The college was named after St. Comhghall an early Irish saint based on Lough Erne. The college motto was "Pray and Work Together".

Most of the students were from Lisnaskea, Maguiresbridge, Newtownbutler, the Knocks and Donagh. The last principal of the college was Gary Kelly and the last vice principal was Brian Armitage.

St. Comhghall's College closed its doors to students in July 2017. It amalgamated with St. Eugene's College Roslea to form a new school called St. Kevin's College, following a decision made by the CCMS and passed by the then Education Minister John O'Dowd. The new school is situated on the old site of St. Comhghall's College. The school was officially unveiled in January 2017 and the event was attended by special guests such as Monsignor Joseph McGuinness and DUP Leader Arlene Foster.

== Sport ==
St. Comhghall's College made local headlines in 1996 after the Under 16 boys team won the All-Ireland. In 2006 the Under 16 girls team made it to the final in the All Ireland. In 2014/15 the U16 boys won the Fermanagh GAA schools championship, which was played in derrylin.

== Academics and the Curriculum ==
In years 8 to 10 the college provided Key Stage 3 education, then from years 11 to 12 the college provided a selection of GCSEs (see table below) and finally in years 13 to 14 the college provided a selection of A Levels (see table below).The college has been noted in the media for having a 100% pass rate at A-Level, meaning all students who studied A-Levels and at the college achieved at least a grade C. At GCSE the school has also had a 100% pass rate meaning all pupils achieved 5 or more GCSEs grades A*-C ranking it as Northern Ireland's best achieving post primary school.

Level	Subject
List of GCSE Subjects Taught
GCSE	Home Economics
GCSE	Business Studies
GCSE	Various Languages
GCSE	Science
GCSE	Religious Studies
GCSE	Music
GCSE	Mathematics
GCSE	ICT
GCSE	History
GCSE	English
GCSE	Art and Design
GCSE	Technology and Design
List of A-Level Subjects Taught
A Level	Physical Education
A Level	Home Economics
A Level	Science
A Level	Business Studies
A Level	Religious Education
A Level	Mathematics
A Level	English
A Level	Technology and Design
A Level	Art and Design

== College Principals ==
Pearse Mulligan served as college principal from the opening of the school in 1970 until 1982. Gary Kelly was principal from 2006 to 2017. Kelly implemented various changes such as introducing more subjects to the school curriculum.

Commenced Post	Resigned Post	Name
1970	1982	Mr. Mulligan
1982	1990	Mr. Maguire
1990	1998	Mr. Dick Tracey
1998	2006	Mr. Hugh Kelly
2006	2017	Mr. Gary Kelly

== Merger ==
In March 2010 the Northern Ireland Commission for Catholic Education published a report which outlined plans that would see St Eugene's College, Rosslea and St. Aidan's High School Derrylin merged into one single college on the site of St. Comhghalls college in Lisnaskea.

Principal of St. Comhghall's Gary Kelly said regarding the future merger

"It's this proposal or nothing, There's a proposal on the table and if that's the way it's going to go, then that's the way it's going to go. As long as we have the best education provision for all the children here, that's all I am interested in. The staff believe in these plans. There has been no mention at all about the safety of jobs, it hasn't been talked about. I suppose on the grand scale of things, with a proposal like this, there are safeguards in place. That's the important thing in all of this. There are safeguards for parents, for pupils and for staff

This merger happened in 2017 with St. Aiden's Derrylin being allowed to stay open and serve the local community with education up to GCSE level. Both St. Comhghall's and St. Eugene's Closed their doors in July 2017 and St. Kevin's College opened in 2017 on the site of St. Comhghall's in Lisnaskea. Mr. Gary Kelly continued on as Principal however there is a new Vice Principal Mrs. McDonald.

== Visit from the President ==
The President of Ireland, Mary McAleese and her husband, Dr. Martin McAleese, who has maternal (McElgunn) roots in Fermanagh paid a visit to St. Comhghalls College on 15 September 2007.

In the President's address to the student body of the college, she recalled the bad old days when people were forced by poverty and politics to emigrate.

The present, however, was different: "By some kind of a miracle, things are beginning to come together", she said, "not by coincidence but by sheer hard work and you young people, you will rove to us and show us the reality which is what Ireland should be like, that there is peace and prosperity. It is going to be an extraordinary Ireland, the best Ireland ever, and you are to be its inheritors and its leaders".

== Notable former pupils ==
- Gerry McHugh MLA – Independent Politician, Fermanagh County Councillor and MLA.

== See also ==
- Diocese of Clogher
- List of secondary schools in Northern Ireland
- Lisnaskea
- Maguiresbridge
- Newtownbutler
- Donagh
