= Aghacramphill =

Townland in County Fermanagh, Northern Ireland

- townland

Irish transcription(s)
  - Derivation: Achadh Creamh Choille
  - Meaning: field of the wild garlic
- Aghacramphill shown within Northern Ireland Aghacramphill (the United Kingdom)
- Coordinates: 54°21′06″N 7°17′27″W
- Sovereign state: United Kingdom
- Country: Northern Ireland
- County: Fermanagh
- Barony: Magherastephana
- Civil parish: Aghalurcher
- First recorded: 1630

Area
  - Total: 131.3 acres (53.15 ha)
- Irish grid ref: H4616144994

Aghacramphill (Irish: Achadh Creamh Choille, meaning 'field of the wild garlic') is a townland in County Fermanagh, Northern Ireland. It is in the historic barony of Magherastephana and the civil parish of Aghalurcher and covers an area of 130 acres.
