= Castle Balfour Demesne =

Townland in County Fermanagh, Northern Ireland

Coordinates: 54.2523°N 7.4423°W

Castle Balfour
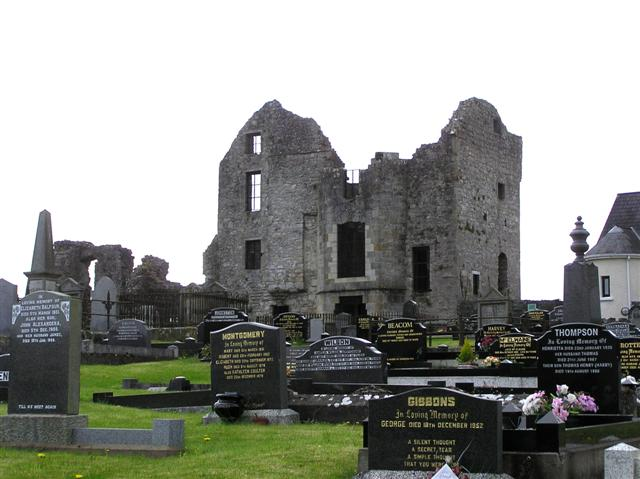
- Castle Balfour, Lisnaskea, County Fermanagh, Northern Ireland

- Location within Northern Ireland
- Irish grid reference: H3634
- District: Fermanagh and Omagh
- County: County Fermanagh
- Country: Northern Ireland
- Sovereign state: United Kingdom
- Postcode district: BT
- Dialling code: 028, +44 28
- UK Parliament: Fermanagh and South Tyrone
- NI Assembly: Fermanagh and South Tyrone

Castle Balfour Demesne is a townland of 201 acres in County Fermanagh, Northern Ireland. It is situated in the civil parish of Aghalurcher and the historic barony of Magherastephana. It contains part of the small town of Lisnaskea, with the remainder in the townland of Lisoneill.

The townland contains the 17th-century remains of Castle Balfour, just off the main street in Lisnaskea, built around 1618 by James, Lord Balfour of Glenawley. The castle was altered in 1652 and damaged in 1689, but remained inhabited into the 19th century. It was restored and conserved in the 1960s and 1990s.

There was also evidence of a very much earlier ringfort (with radiocarbon dates of 359-428 AD) in the townland suggesting the area was inhabited from a very early date.

The listed Church of Ireland Holy Trinity Church is also situated in the townland.

== See also ==
- List of townlands in County Fermanagh
