= Lisoneill =

Townland in County Fermanagh, Northern Ireland

Lisoneill: Irish: Lios Uí Néill
- County: County Fermanagh
- Country: Northern Ireland
- Sovereign state: United Kingdom
- Police: Northern Ireland
- Fire: Northern Ireland
- Ambulance: Northern Ireland

Lisoneill (from Irish Lios Uí Néill, meaning 'O'Neill's fort') is a townland of 145 acres in County Fermanagh, Northern Ireland. It is situated in the civil parish of Aghalurcher and the historic barony of Magherastephana. It contains the main part of the small town of Lisnaskea, with the remainder in the townland of Castle Balfour Demesne.
