= Maurice McGuire =

Maurice McGuire was a priest in Ireland during the 15th century.

The Rector of Aghalurcher, he was Archdeacon of Clogher until his death on 26 April 1423.
