= List of geological faults of Ireland =

This is a list of the named geological faults affecting the rocks of Ireland. Those of Northern Ireland are listed elsewhere.

== Terminology ==
See the main article on faults for a fuller treatment of fault types and nomenclature but in brief, the main types are normal faults, reverse faults, thrusts or thrust faults and strike-slip faults.

=== Key to table ===
- Column 1 indicates the name of the fault. Note that different authors may deploy different names for one and the same feature, or a part of a feature. Conversely the same name may be applied to two different features, particularly in the case of smaller faults with a wide geographic separation.
- Column 2 indicates the county in which the fault occurs. Some traverse two or more counties of course.
- Column 3 indicates the Irish grid reference for the approximate midpoint of the fault (as mapped). Note that the mapped extent of a fault may not correspond to its actual extent.
- Column 4 indicates on which sheet of the Geological Survey of Ireland's 1:50,000 scale geological map series of Ireland, the fault is shown and named (either on map/s or cross-section/s or both).
- Column 5 indicates a selection of publications in which references to the fault may be found. See references section for full details of publication.

== Tabulated list of faults ==
Sortable table of faults
Fault name	County	grid ref	GSI map sheet	book reference/s
Caherconree Fault	Kerry	Q020620		GeolDinglePen
Dunquin Fault	Kerry	Q350020		GeolDinglePen
Fohernamanagh Fault	Kerry	Q500157		GeolDinglePen

== See also ==
- List of geological faults of Northern Ireland
