= Coole (barony) =

Coole An Chúil (Irish)
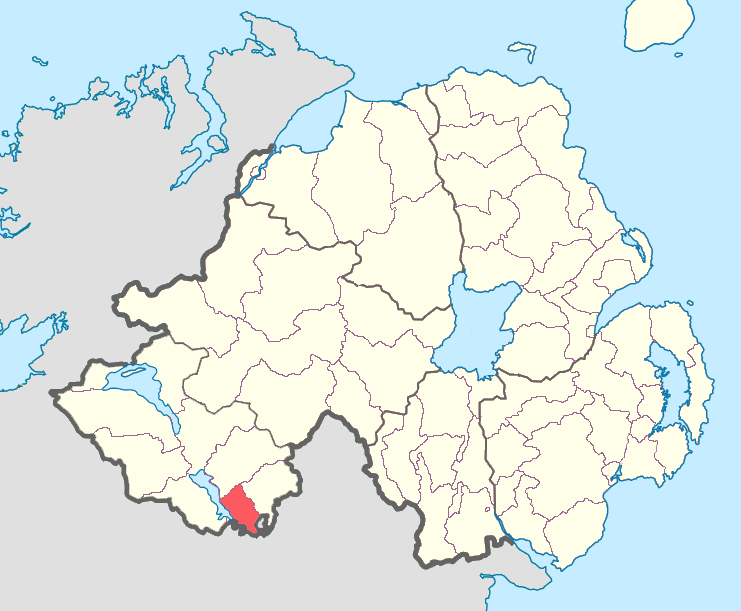
- Location of Coole, County Fermanagh, Northern Ireland.
- Sovereign state: United Kingdom
- Jurisdiction: Northern Ireland
- Province: Ulster
- County: County Fermanagh

Coole (from Irish An Chúil 'corner') is a barony in the south-east of County Fermanagh in Northern Ireland. To its west lies Upper Lough Erne, and it is bordered by three other baronies in Northern Ireland: Knockninny to the west; Magherastephana to the north; and Clankelly. It also borders three baronies in the Republic of Ireland: Dartree (or Dartraige) to the east; Tullygarvey and Loughtee Lower to the south.

== History ==
Coole is based upon the ancient territory of Cuil, which was frequently referred to as the residence of the O'Cassidys (Irish: Ó Caiside). The O'Cassidys became the head physicians of the Maguires, and the territory was a collateral or dynastic branch of the Maguires. In the Annals it appears as Cuil na nOirear, which may have applied to an old half-barony near Enniskillen.

== List of main settlements ==
- Newtownbutler
- Wattlebridge

== List of civil parishes ==
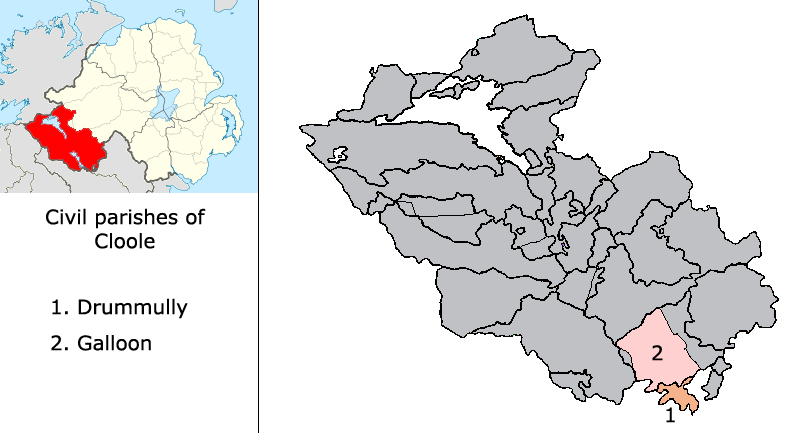
Civil parishes within the barony of Coole, County Fermanagh, Northern Ireland

Below is a list of civil parishes in Coole:

- Galloon (split with the baronies of Clankelly and Knockninny)
- Drummully (split with the barony of Clankelly)
