= St. Kevin's College =

St. Kevin's College can refer to:

- St Kevin's College, Dublin, Ireland
- St Kevin's College, Lisnaskea, Northern Ireland
- St Kevin's College, Melbourne, Australia
- St Kevin's College, Oamaru, New Zealand
