= St Kevin's College, Lisnaskea =

Coordinates: 54.349°N 7.626°W

St Kevin’s College
- Lisnaskea; Northern Ireland

Information
- School type: Secondary School
- Motto: believe, achieve, succeed
- Established: 2017
- Principal: Gary Kelly
- Website: www.stkevinscollege.co.uk

St. Kevin's College is based in Lisnaskea, County Fermanagh, Northern Ireland. It is a Roman Catholic school for boys and girls. It was formed in 2017 as a result of a merger of two schools, St Eugene's College and St.Comhghall's. The principal of St. Kevin's is Gary Kelly and the vice principal is Mrs. McDonalds. The school has over 700 students and is the best performing secondary school in Northern Ireland. The school has opened a new maths department in 2021 and is planning to open a new department in 2023.

The school also has an Instagram page, a Facebook page and a Tiktok account.
