= Shanaghy =

Shanaghy may refer to a number of places in Ireland, including:

- Shanaghy, also known as Ardnaree, a townland in Ballina, County Mayo
- Shanaghy, County Fermanagh, a townland in Aghalurcher civil parish
