= List of Cambridge International Examinations Ordinary Level subjects =

The following is a list of GCE Ordinary Level subjects offered by Cambridge International Examinations (CAIE). More than 40 subjects may be taken.

Cambridge O Levels, Cambridge IGCSE and/or Cambridge International Level 1 or Level 2 Certificates may be taken in the same examination session but certain combinations of subjects are not allowed as described below.

Cambridge O Levels are only available for centres in administrative zones 3, 4 and 5.

Syllabus Code	Syllabus Title	Availability			Notes	Further Details
Syllabus Code	Syllabus Title	May and June	October and November	Private candidates	Notes	Further Details
CIE 1115	English Language (Caribbean)	—N/a	Yes	—N/a	Caribbean area only, candidates in the Caribbean area taking O Level English Language had to enter for this syllabus; last exam in 2010	—N/a
CIE 1119	English Language (Malaysia)	—N/a	Yes	—N/a	Malaysia only	—N/a
CIE 1120	English Language (Brunei)	Yes	Yes	—N/a	Brunei only, candidates in Brunei taking O Level English Language must enter for this syllabus	—N/a
CIE 1123	English Language	Yes	Yes	Yes	Cannot be combined with syllabuses 0500, 0510 and 0511 (IGCSE), 0522 (Level 1/2 Certificate), 1115, 1119, 1120, 1124, 1125, 1126, 1127 and 1128 (O Level)	link
CIE 1124	English Language (Seychelles)	—N/a	Yes	—N/a	Seychelles only, candidates in Seychelles taking O Level English Language had to enter for this syllabus; last exam in 2008	—N/a
CIE 1125	English Language (Mauritius)	No	Yes	—N/a	Mauritius only, candidates in Mauritius taking O Level English Language must enter for this syllabus or syllabus 1126	—N/a
CIE 1126	English Language (Syllabus B) (Mauritius)	No	Yes	—N/a	Mauritius only, candidates in Mauritius taking O Level English Language must enter for this syllabus or syllabus 1125	—N/a
CIE 1127	English Language (Singapore)	Yes	Yes	Yes	Singapore only, last exam in 2014	
CIE 1128	English Language (Singapore)	Yes	Yes	Yes	Singapore only, available from 2013	
CIE 1135	Arabic as a Third Language (Singapore)	Yes	Yes	No	Singapore only	syllabus
CIE 1136	Bahasa Indonesia as a Third Language (Singapore)	Yes	Yes	No	Singapore only	syllabus
CIE 1201	Bahasa Melayu (Brunei)	Yes	Yes	—N/a	Brunei only	—N/a
CIE 2010	Literature in English	Yes	Yes	Yes	Cannot be combined with syllabuses 0408 and 0486 (IGCSE) and 0476 (Level 1/2 Certificate)	link
CIE 2014	Literature in English (Singapore)	No	Yes	Yes	Singapore only; last exam in 2014	syllabus
CIE 2023	Malay Literature (Brunei)	Yes	Yes	—N/a	Brunei only	—N/a
CIE 2047	Islamic Religious Knowledge (Brunei)	Yes	Yes	—N/a	Brunei only	—N/a
CIE 2035 (old code 2048)	(Biblical Studies)	Yes	Yes	Yes	Cannot be combined with syllabuses 0490 (IGCSE) and 2049 (O Level)	link
CIE 2049	Religious Studies (Bible Knowledge) (Singapore)	Yes	Yes	Exclusive	Singapore only	syllabus
CIE 2055	Hinduism	No	Yes	Yes		link
CIE 2056	Islamic Religion and Culture	No	Yes	Yes	Cannot be combined with 0493 (IGCSE) and 2058 (O Level)	link
CIE 2058	Islamiyat	Yes	Yes	Yes	Cannot be combined with 0493 (IGCSE) and 2056 (O Level)	link
CIE 2059	Pakistan Studies	Yes	Yes	Yes	Cannot be combined with syllabus 0448 (IGCSE)	link
CIE 2065	Literature in English (Singapore)	Yes	Yes	Yes	Singapore only; available from 2014	syllabus
CIE 2101	Ulum al-Quran (Brunei)	No	Yes	—N/a	Brunei only	—N/a
CIE 2102	Hafaz al-Quran (Brunei)	No	Yes	—N/a	Brunei only	—N/a
CIE 2103	Tafsir al-Quran (Asas) (Brunei)	No	Yes	—N/a	Brunei only	—N/a
CIE 2134	History (Modern World Affairs)	Yes	Yes	Yes	Cannot be combined with syllabuses 2162 and 2173 (O Level); first exam in 2015, to replace syllabus 2158	link
CIE 2138	History (World Affairs 1917 - 1991) (Singapore)	Yes	Yes	Yes	Singapore only; last exam in 2013	syllabus
CIE 2158	History (World Affairs 1917 - 1991)	Yes	Yes	Yes	Cannot be combined with syllabuses 0470 (IGCSE), 2160, 2162 and 2173 (O Level); last exam in 2014, to be replaced with syllabus 2134 from 2015	link
CIE 2160	History (Central and Southern Africa)	No	Yes	—N/a	Central and Southern Africa only	—N/a
CIE 2162	History (Mauritius)	No	Yes	—N/a	Mauritius only	—N/a
CIE 2171	History (Brunei)	Yes	Yes	—N/a	Brunei only	—N/a
CIE 2173	History (Singapore)	Yes	Yes	Yes	Singapore only; last exam in 2014	syllabus
CIE 2174	History (Singapore)	Yes	Yes	Yes	Singapore only; available from 2014	syllabus
CIE 2192	Combined Humanities (Singapore)	Yes	Yes	Yes	Singapore only; last exam in 2015	syllabus
CIE 2204	Combined Humanities (Singapore)	Yes	Yes	Yes	Singapore only; available from 2014; last exam in 2017	syllabus
CIE 2210	Computer Science	Yes	Yes	Yes	Common with syllabus 0478 (IGCSE); first exam in 2015, to replace syllabus 7010	link
CIE 2217	Geography	Yes	Yes	Yes	Cannot be combined with syllabuses 0460 (IGCSE), 2223 and 2230 (O Level)	link
CIE 2223	Geography (Southern Africa)	No	Yes	—N/a	South Africa only	—N/a
CIE 2230	Geography (Brunei)	Yes	Yes	—N/a	Brunei only	—N/a
CIE 2235	Geography (Singapore)	Yes	Yes	Yes	last exam in 2014	syllabus
CIE 2236	Geography (Singapore)	Yes	Yes	Yes	Available from 2014	syllabus
CIE 2251	Sociology	Yes	Yes	Yes	Cannot be combined with syllabus 0495 (IGCSE)	link
CIE 2267	Combined Humanities (Singapore)	Yes	Yes	Yes	Singapore only; available from 2017	syllabus
CIE 2281	Economics	Yes	Yes	Yes	Cannot be combined with syllabus 0455 (IGCSE)	link
CIE 2284	Economics (Singapore)	No	Yes	Yes	Singapore only; last exam in 2013	syllabus
CIE 3012	French (Singapore)	No	Yes	Yes	Singapore only	syllabus
CIE 3015	French	Yes	No	Yes	Cannot be combined with syllabus 0501 (IGCSE)	link
CIE 3025	German	No	Yes	Yes		link
CIE 3028	German (Singapore)	No	Yes	Yes	Singapore only	syllabus
CIE 3035	Spanish	No	Yes	Yes	Cannot be combined with syllabus 0502 (IGCSE)	link
CIE 3158	Setswana	No	Yes	Yes		link
CIE 3162	Swahili	Yes	No	Yes		link
CIE 3180	Arabic	No	Yes	Yes	Cannot be combined with syllabus 0508 (IGCSE)	link
CIE 3183	Arabic (Brunei)	No	Yes	—N/a	Brunei only	—N/a
CIE 3186	Arabic (Singapore)	No	Yes	Exclusive	Singapore only	syllabus
CIE 3194	Hindi (Singapore)	No	Yes	Yes	Singapore only	syllabus
CIE 3195	Hindi	—N/a	Yes	—N/a		link
CIE 3196	Urdu (Singapore)	No	Yes	Yes	Singapore only	syllabus
CIE 3199	Gujarati (Singapore)	No	Yes	Yes	Singapore only	syllabus
CIE 3202	Nepali	Yes	No	Yes		link
CIE 3203	Panjabi (Singapore)	No	Yes	Yes	Singapore only	syllabus
CIE 3204	Bengali	Yes	No	Yes		link
CIE 3205	Sinhala	Yes	No	Yes	Cannot be combined with syllabus 3206	link
CIE 3206	Tamil	Yes	No	Yes	Cannot be combined with syllabus 3205	link
CIE 3215	Bengali (Singapore)	No	Yes	Yes	Singapore only	syllabus
CIE 3247	First Language Urdu	Yes	No	Yes	Cannot be combined with syllabus 3248	link
CIE 3248	Second Language Urdu	Yes	Yes	Yes	Cannot be combined with syllabus 3247	link
CIE 3249	Burmese (Singapore)	No	Yes	Yes	Singapore only	syllabus
CIE 3260	Thai (Singapore)	No	Yes	Yes	Singapore only	syllabus
CIE 3261	Japanese (Singapore)	No	Yes	Yes	Singapore only	syllabus
CIE 4016	Mathematics (Singapore)	Yes	Yes	Yes	Singapore only; last exam in 2016	syllabus
CIE 4021	Mathematics (Syllabus A) (Mauritius)	—N/a	Yes	—N/a	Mauritius only	—N/a
CIE 4024	Mathematics (Syllabus D)	Yes	Yes	Yes	Cannot be combined with syllabuses 0580 and 0581 (IGCSE), 4021, 4026 and 4029 (O Level)	link
CIE 4026	Mathematics (Syllabus E) (Brunei)	—N/a	Yes	—N/a	Brunei only; last exam in 2010	—N/a
CIE 4029	Mathematics (Syllabus D) (Mauritius)	No	Yes	Yes	Mauritius only; cannot be combined with syllabuses 0580 and 0581 (IGCSE), 4021 and 4024 (O Level)	syllabus
CIE 4037	Additional Mathematics	Yes	Yes	Yes	Common with syllabus 0606 (IGCSE)	link
CIE 4038	Additional Mathematics (Singapore)	Yes	Yes	Yes	Singapore only; last exam in 2014	syllabus
CIE 4040	Statistics	No	Yes	Yes		link
CIE 4047	Additional Mathematics (Singapore)	Yes	Yes	Yes	Singapore only; available from 2014	syllabus
CIE 4048	Mathematics (Singapore)	Yes	Yes	Yes	Singapore only; available from 2016	syllabus
CIE 4049	Additional Mathematics (Singapore)	Yes	Yes	Yes	Singapore only; available from 2021	syllabus
CIE 4345	Accounting (Namibia)	—N/a	Yes	—N/a	Namibia only	—N/a
CIE 5014	Environmental Management	Yes	Yes	Yes		link
CIE 5038	Agriculture	No	Yes	No		link
CIE 5054	Physics	Yes	Yes	Yes	Cannot be combined with syllabuses 0652, 0653 and 0654 (IGCSE) and 5129 (O Level)	link
CIE 5057	Physics (Singapore)	Yes	Yes	Exclusive	Singapore only; last exam in 2014	syllabus
CIE 5058	Physics (with Coursework) (Singapore)	Yes	Yes	No	Singapore only; last exam in 2014	syllabus
CIE 5059	Physics (with Coursework) (Singapore)	Yes	Yes	No	Singapore only; available from 2014; Coursework to be phased out from 2018 (to replace one-time practical assessment)	syllabus
CIE 5064	Physics (Singapore)	Yes	Yes	Exclusive	Singapore only; available from 2014; last exam in 2017	syllabus
CIE 5067	Chemistry (Singapore)	Yes	Yes	Exclusive	Singapore only; last exam in 2014	
CIE 5070	Chemistry	Yes	Yes	Yes	Cannot be combined with syllabuses 0652, 0653 and 0654 (IGCSE) and 5129 (O Level)	link
CIE 5072	Chemistry (with Coursework) (Singapore)	Yes	Yes	No	Singapore only; last exam in 2014	syllabus
CIE 5073	Chemistry (with Coursework) (Singapore)	Yes	Yes	No	Singapore only; available from 2014; Coursework to be phased out from 2018 (to replace one-time practical assessment)	syllabus
CIE 5074	Chemistry (Singapore)	Yes	Yes	Exclusive	Singapore only; available from 2014; last exam in 2017	
CIE 5076	Science (Physics, Chemistry) (Singapore)	Yes	Yes	Yes	Singapore only; available from 2014	syllabus
CIE 5077	Science (Physics, Biology) (Singapore)	Yes	Yes	Yes	Singapore only; available from 2014	syllabus
CIE 5078	Science (Chemistry, Biology) (Singapore)	Yes	Yes	Yes	Singapore only; available from 2014	syllabus
CIE 5090	Biology	Yes	Yes	Yes	Cannot be combined with syllabuses 0653 and 0654 (IGCSE), 5096, 5125, 5126, 5129 and 5130 (O Level)	link
CIE 5094	Biology (with Coursework) (Singapore)	Yes	Yes	No	Singapore only; last exam in 2014	syllabus
CIE 5096	Human and Social Biology	Yes	Yes	Yes	Cannot be combined with syllabuses 0608, 0610, 0653 and 0654 (IGCSE), 5090, 5129 and 5131 (O Level)	link
CIE 5100	Biology (Singapore)	Yes	Yes	Exclusive	Singapore only; last exam in 2014	syllabus
CIE 5108	Biology (Singapore)	Yes	Yes	Exclusive	Singapore only; available from 2014; last exam in 2017	syllabus
CIE 5116	Science (Physics, Chemistry) (Singapore)	Yes	Yes	Yes	Singapore only; last exam in 2014	syllabus
CIE 5117	Science (Physics, Biology) (Singapore)	Yes	Yes	Yes	Singapore only; last exam in 2014	syllabus
CIE 5118	Science (Chemistry, Biology) (Singapore)	Yes	Yes	Yes	Singapore only; last exam in 2014	syllabus
CIE 5124	Science (Physics, Chemistry)	—N/a	Yes	—N/a		link
CIE 5125	Science (Physics, Biology)	—N/a	Yes	—N/a		link
CIE 5126	Science (Chemistry, Biology)	—N/a	Yes	—N/a		link
CIE 5129	Combined Science	Yes	Yes	Yes	Cannot be combined with syllabuses 0608, 0610, 0620, 0625, 0652, 0653 and 0654 (IGCSE), 5054, 5070, 5090, 5096 and 5131 (O Level)	link
CIE 5130	Additional Combined Science	No	Yes	Yes	last exam in 2007	link
CIE 5131	Science for All	—N/a	—N/a	—N/a		—N/a
CIE 5158	Biology (with Coursework) (Singapore)	Yes	Yes	No	Singapore only; available from 2014; Coursework to be phased out from 2018 (to replace one-time practical assessment)	syllabus
CIE 5999	Drama (Singapore)	Yes	Yes	No	Singapore only	syllabus
CIE 6010	Art	Partial	Yes	Partial	Cannot be combined with syllabus 0400 (IGCSE); last exam in 2014, to be replaced with syllabuses 6089 and 6090 from 2015	link
CIE 6030	Woodwork	No	Yes	—N/a	expired	link
CIE 6031	Art (Singapore)	Yes	Yes	Exclusive	Singapore only	syllabus
CIE 6040	Metalwork	No	Yes	—N/a	expired	link
CIE 6043	Design and Technology	No	Yes	No		link
CIE 6050	Fashion and Fabrics	No	Yes	No	Cannot be combined with syllabuses 0638 and 0649 (IGCSE); to be replaced with syllabus 6130 after 2013	link
CIE 6053	Music (Singapore)	Yes	Yes	No	Singapore only; last exam in 2014	syllabus
CIE 6055	Higher Music (Singapore)	Yes	Yes	No	Singapore only; last exam in 2014	syllabus
CIE 6065	Food and Nutrition	Yes	Yes	No	Common with syllabus 0648 (IGCSE)	link
CIE 6075	Home Management	No	Yes	—N/a	last exam in 2007	link
CIE 6080	Physical Education (Singapore)	Yes	Yes	No	Singapore only	syllabus
CIE 6082	Food and Nutrition (Singapore)	Yes	Yes	No	Singapore only; last exam in 2014	syllabus
CIE 6085	Music (Singapore)	Yes	Yes	No	Singapore only; available from 2013	syllabus
CIE 6086	Higher Music (Singapore)	Yes	Yes	No	Singapore only; available from 2013	syllabus
CIE 6087	Food and Nutrition (Singapore)	Yes	Yes	No	Singapore only; available from 2013	syllabus
CIE 6089	Art and Design (Brunei)	Yes	Yes	Yes	Brunei only; cannot be combined with syllabuses 0400 (IGCSE) and 6090 (O Level); first exam in 2015, to replace syllabus 6010	—N/a
CIE 6090	Art and Design	Yes	Yes	Yes	Bangladesh, The Maldives, Mauritius and Pakistan only; cannot be combined with syllabuses 0400 (IGCSE) and 6089 (O Level); first exam in 2015, to replace syllabus 6010	link
CIE 6123	Art (with Coursework) (Singapore)	Yes	Yes	No	Singapore only	syllabus
CIE 6124	Higher Art (Singapore)	Yes	Yes	No	Singapore only	syllabus
CIE 6130	Fashion and Textiles	No	Yes	No	Available from 2014, replacing syllabus 6050; cannot be combined with syllabuses 0638 and 0649 (IGCSE)	link
CIE 7010	Computer Studies	Yes	Yes	Partial	Common with syllabus 0420 (IGCSE); last exam in 2014, to be replaced with syllabus 2210 from 2015	link
CIE 7017	Computer Studies (Singapore)	Yes	Yes	No	Singapore only; last exam in 2014	syllabus
CIE 7048	CDT: Design and Communication	No	Yes	No	available from 2009	link
CIE 7051	Design and Technology (D&T) (Singapore)	Yes	Yes	No	Singapore only	syllabus
CIE 7085	Business Studies (Singapore)	Yes	Yes	Yes	Singapore only	syllabus
CIE 7090	Commercial (Singapore)	Yes	Yes	Exclusive	Singapore only; last exam in 2012	syllabus
CIE 7092	Principles of Accounts (Singapore)	Yes	Yes	Yes	Singapore only; last exam in 2015	syllabus
CIE 7094	Bangladesh Studies	Yes	Future	Yes	Cannot be combined with syllabus 0449 (IGCSE)	link
CIE 7096	Travel and Tourism	No	Yes	Partial	Cannot be combined with syllabus 0471 (IGCSE)	link
CIE 7100	Commerce	Yes	Yes	Yes	Cannot be combined with syllabus 7101	link
CIE 7101	Commercial Studies	No	Yes	Yes	Cannot be combined with syllabuses 0598 (IGCSE), 7090 and 7100 (O Level)	link
CIE 7707	Accounting	Yes	Yes	Yes	Cannot be combined with syllabuses 0452 and 0614 (IGCSE), 4345, 7092 and 7175 (O Level).The Cambridge O Level Principles of Accounts 7110 syllabus has been revised and now has a new title and code: Cambridge O Level Accounting 7707. The last examination series for Cambridge O Level Principles of Accounts 7110 will be November 2019.	link
CIE 7115	Business Studies	Yes	Yes	Yes		link
CIE 7087	Principles of Accounts (Singapore)	Yes	Yes	Yes	Singapore only; available from 2015	syllabus

- Partial means that only some components are available for that session.

== See also ==
- Cambridge International Examinations (CAIE)
- University of Cambridge Local Examinations Syndicate (UCLES)
- GCE Ordinary Level
- GCE Advanced Level
- Cambridge O level and A level Past Paper to Marks Scheme Searcher
- List of CAIE Advanced Level subjects
- GCE Ordinary Level
