= List of geological faults of Northern Ireland =

This is a list of the named geological faults affecting the rocks of Northern Ireland.

== Terminology ==
See the main article on faults for a fuller treatment of fault types and nomenclature but in brief, the main types are normal faults, reverse faults, thrusts or thrust faults and strike-slip faults.

=== Key to table ===
- Column 1 indicates the name of the fault. Note that different authors may deploy different names for one and the same feature, or a part of a feature. Conversely the same name may be applied to two different features, particularly in the case of smaller faults with a wide geographic separation.
- Column 2 indicates the county in which the fault occurs. Some traverse two or more counties of course.
- Column 3 indicates the Irish grid reference for the approximate midpoint of the fault (as mapped). Note that the mapped extent of a fault may not correspond to its actual extent.
- Column 4 indicates on which sheet of the Geological Survey of Northern Ireland's 1:50,000 scale geological map series of Northern Ireland, the fault is shown and named (either on map/s or cross-section/s or both). Some of the faults are also depicted on the 1:250,000 scale geological map of Northern Ireland.
- Column 5 indicates a selection of publications in which references to the fault may be found. See references section for full details of publication.

== Tabulated list of faults ==
Sortable table of faults
Fault name	County	grid ref	GSNI map sheet	book reference/s
Ballyconnell-Belturbet Fault			NIr 57/58	
Ballytober Fault	Antrim	D3304		
Belcoo Fault	Fermanagh	G1842	NIr 44	Mem NI 44
Camlough Fault	Armagh	J0621		
Carnlough Fault	Antrim	D2508		
Clogher Valley Fault	Fermanagh	G4545		
Elagh Fault	Tyrone	H8573		
Great Gaw Fault	Antrim			Lyle P. 2003 (p170,177)
Killadeas - Seskinore Fault	Fermanagh, Tyrone	G4161		
Kinnegoe Fault	Armagh	H0459		
Laghy Fault	Tyrone	H0984		
Newry Fault	Armagh, Down	J0829		
Omagh Fault	Tyrone			Lyle P. 2003 (p117,124,125)
Omagh Thrust	Tyrone	G4573		
Orlock Bridge Fault	Armagh, Down	J5079		Lyle P. 2003 (p41,42)
Pettigoe Fault	Tyrone	H2080		
Sixmilewater Fault	Antrim	J3091		
Tempo - Sixmilecross Fault	Fermanagh	H3547		
Tow Valley Fault	Antrim, Londonderry	C9524		Lyle P. 2003 (p63,65,177,179)

== See also ==
- List of geological faults of England
- List of geological faults of Scotland
- List of geological faults of Wales
- List of geological folds in Great Britain
- Geological structure of Great Britain
