= Tow Valley Fault =

Coordinates: 55.05428°N 6.51423°W

Tow Valley Fault is a geological fault in County Antrim, Northern Ireland.

== See also ==
- List of geological faults in Northern Ireland
