= Ballytober Fault =

Geological fault in County Antrim, Northern Ireland

Coordinates: 54.86604°N 5.92925°W

Ballytober Fault is a geological fault in County Antrim, Northern Ireland.

== See also ==
- List of geological faults in Northern Ireland
