= Michael Sleavon =

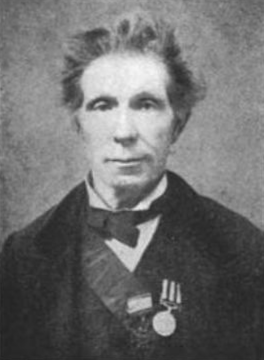
- Born: c. 1826; Magheraculmoney, County Fermanagh
- Died: 15 August 1902 (aged 75-76); Dromard, Kesh, County Fermanagh
- Burial place: Bannagh Roman Catholic Churchyard, Ederney
- Military career
- Allegiance: United Kingdom
- Branch: British Army
- Rank: Corporal
- Units: Royal Engineers
- Conflicts: Indian Mutiny
- Awards: Victoria Cross

Michael Sleavon VC (c. 1826 – 15 August 1902) was an Irish recipient of the Victoria Cross.

== Details ==
Michael Sleavon was born in Magheraculmoney, County Fermanagh. At the age of 31, he was a corporal in the Corps of Royal Engineers during the Indian Mutiny. On 3 April 1858 at Jhansi, India, his actions led to the award of the Victoria Cross:

For determined bravery at the attack of the Fort of Jhansi, on the 3rd of April, 1858, in maintaining his position at the head of a sap, and continuing the work under a heavy fire, with a cool and steady determination worthy of the highest praise.

== Further information ==
He died in Dromard, Kesh, County Fermanagh on 15 August 1902 and was buried in Bannagh Roman Catholic Churchyard, Tubrid.
