= Omagh Thrust =

Geological fault in County Tyrone, Northern Ireland

Coordinates: 54.60224°N 8.85178°W

Geological map of Ireland. The red line marks the Omagh Thrust Fault.

The Omagh Thrust Fault is a geological fault in County Tyrone. It is of one of the most important structural discontinuities in Northern Ireland and an extension of the Highland Boundary Fault which runs through Scotland.

The fault occurred in the Caledonian orogeny, during a late stage of this period of mountain building. Older sequences of Dalriadan metamorphic strata were moved over younger Ordovician ones with the fault as their boundary.

There is access to a view of the fault at Mountfield Quarry, County Tyrone. This has been designated an Area of Special Scientific Interest.

== See also ==
- List of geological faults in Northern Ireland
- Geology of Northern Ireland
