= Gilla Mochua Ó Caiside =

Irish poet

Gilla Mochua Ó Caiside, Irish poet, fl. 12th century.

Ó Caiside was a member of a family situated in what is now County Fermanagh. The Ó Caisides were originally a medical family, who were hereditary physicians to the Maguires. A group of poems attributed to him survive; they were printed by C. Plummer in 1922.
