= Sixmilewater Fault =

Geological fault in County Antrim, Northern Ireland

Coordinates: 54.75013°N 5.98177°W

Sixmilewater Fault is a geological fault in County Antrim, Northern Ireland.

== See also ==
- List of geological faults in Northern Ireland
