= Lisnaskea =

Town in County Fermanagh, Northern Ireland

Coordinates: 54.25°N 7.442°W

Lisnaskea: Irish: Lios na Scéithe
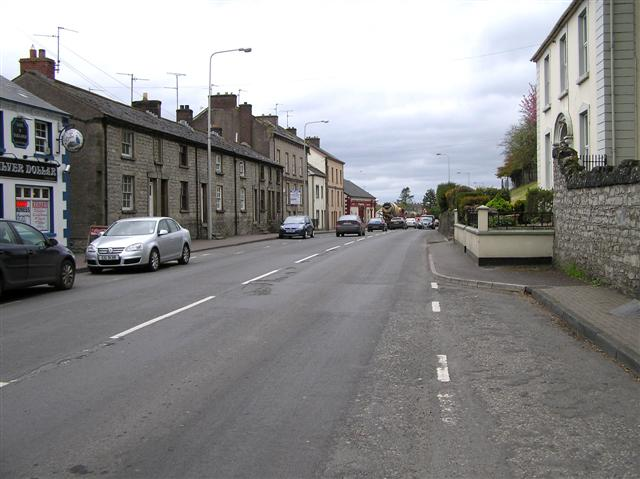
- Lisnaskea's main street, looking northwest

- Location within Northern Ireland
- Population: 3,020 (2021 census)
- Irish grid reference: H3634
- District: Fermanagh and Omagh
- County: County Fermanagh
- Country: Northern Ireland
- Sovereign state: United Kingdom
- Post town: ENNISKILLEN
- Postcode district: BT92
- Dialling code: 028
- UK Parliament: Fermanagh and South Tyrone
- NI Assembly: Fermanagh and South Tyrone

Lisnaskea (from Irish Lios na Scéithe, meaning 'fort of the shield') is the second-biggest settlement in County Fermanagh, Northern Ireland. It is situated mainly in the townland of Lisoneill, with some areas in the townland of Castle Balfour Demesne, both in the civil parish of Aghalurcher and the historic barony of Magherastephana. It had a population of 3,020 people at the 2021 census.

The nearby monument of Sciath Ghabhra is where the Maguires were crowned as kings and chiefs of Fermanagh. The town developed after the Plantation of Ulster and is built around the long main street. At the middle, the old market place, formerly known as The Diamond, contains a high cross (grid ref:H364340) from an early monastery. 19th century buildings include the former market house, corn market and butter market. The Castle Park Leisure Centre is situated just off the main street.

== History ==
The name Lisnaskea comes from Lios na Scéithe meaning "fort of the shield". North of the village, in the townland of Cornashee, is a large burial mound within a round enclosure, which is a scheduled monument. This is believed to be Sciath Ghabhra (Skeagoura), the coronation place of the Maguires, who were kings and chiefs of Fermanagh. Nearby is another ringfort known as Lios Uí Néill (Lisoneill). The name Lisnaskea may be a combination of the 'lis' element of Lisoneill and 'skea' from Skeagoura. There is also evidence of a much earlier ringfort (with radiocarbon dates of 359–428 AD) in the townland of Castle Balfour Demesne, suggesting the area was inhabited from a very early date. The ruins of the old monastery, associated with St Ronan, who died sometime before 635 AD, are to the west of the town.

In 1618, during the Plantation of Ulster, Castle Balfour was built by Scotsman James, Lord Balfour, and its remains are just off the Main Street of Lisnaskea.

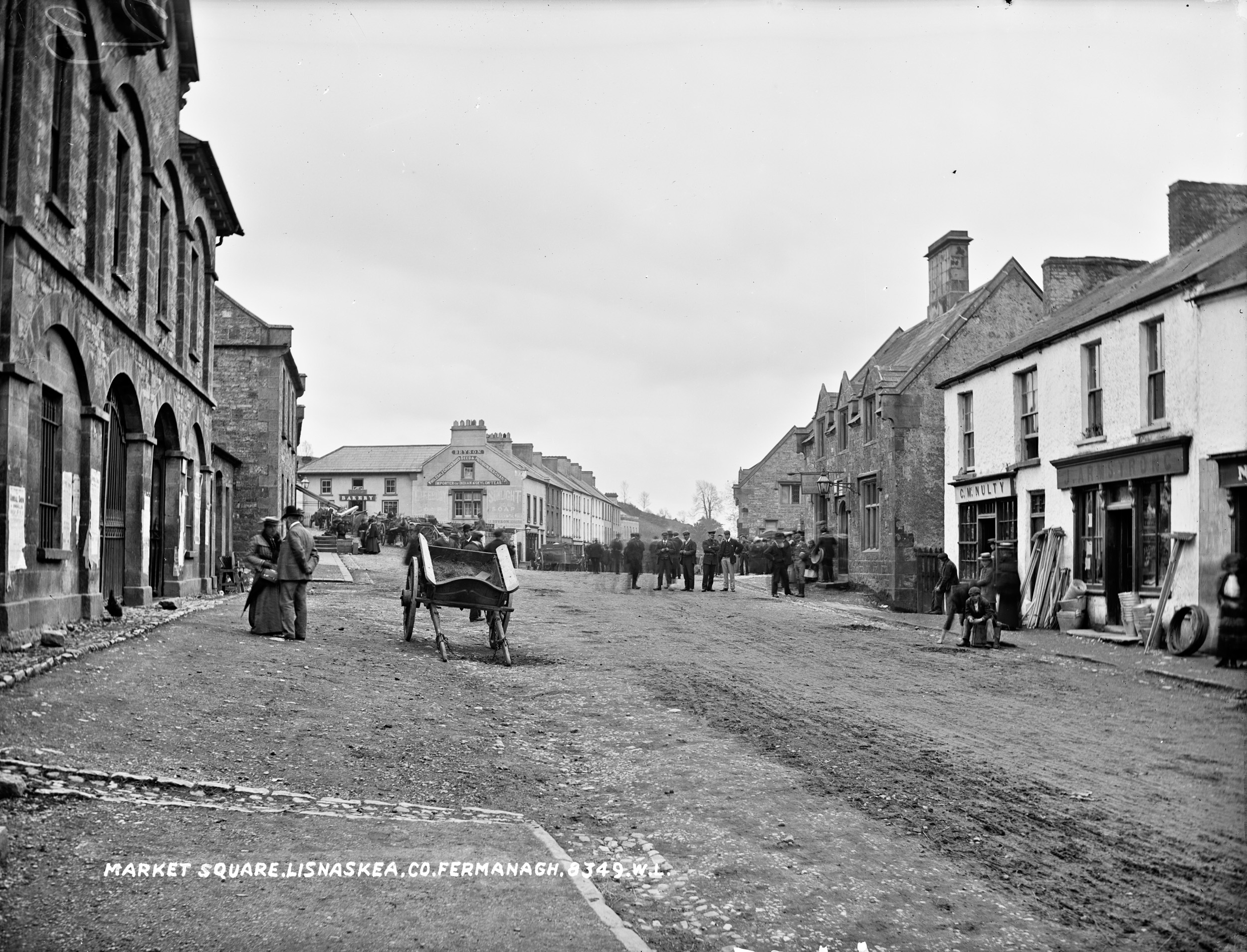
Market Square in Lisnaskea c. 1907

In the Irish Rebellion of 1641, it was noted that: "At Lissenskeah they hanged, or otherwise killed, above 100 persons, most of them of the Scottish nation". The castle was altered in 1652 and damaged in 1689, but remained inhabited into the 19th century. It was restored and conserved in the 1960s and 1990s.

The village came under the control of the Earls of Erne in 1821. They established the market in the town while bolstering and controlling development around the high street.

=== The Troubles ===
In December 2013, suspected dissident republicans fired shots at Lisnaskea PSNI station. There were no casualties.

=== Workhouse ===
Lisnaskea Poor Law Union was formally declared on 27 June 1840, and in August Sir Arthur Brooke was elected chairman. The workhouse was built (at a total cost of over £6,400) on a six-acre site to the south of Lisnaskea purchased from Lord Erne to accommodate 500 inmates, the first of whom were received on 25 February 1843. During 1846, the number of inmates rose from 263 to 817 by the end of the year.

In 1847, additional accommodation was erected for 130 inmates. During 'The Troubles' in the early 1920s, the workhouse was used to house soldiers of the Royal Hampshire Regiment. The workhouse later resumed its operation until 1940 when it was used for men of the 8th Battalion of the Sherwood Foresters. The inmates were transferred to Enniskillen, and in 1948 to Armagh. Eventually, part of the workhouse was used for a time as the headquarters of Lisnaskea Fire Brigade. Later, the buildings were adapted for a mixture of residential and commercial use.

A large iron pot, said to have held 300 gallons of gruel, rested at one time in its gardens. In July 2011, part of the upper floor of the building was completely gutted in a fire, believed to be malicious.

== Sport ==
The local Gaelic Athletic Association (GAA) team, Lisnaskea Emmetts, have won 20 Fermanagh Senior Football Championship titles. In addition to Gaelic football, they also field teams in ladies football and hurling. They won the All-Ireland Intermediate Club Football Championship in 2011, and also won the ladies' equivalent later that year.

== Climate ==
Lisnaskea experiences a maritime climate with cool summers and mild winters.

Climate data for Lisnaskea (1991–2020 normals)
Month	Jan	Feb	Mar	Apr	May	Jun	Jul	Aug	Sep	Oct	Nov	Dec	Year
Record high °C (°F)	13.5 (56.3)	15.6 (60.1)	16.1 (61.0)	22.1 (71.8)	25.8 (78.4)	29.0 (84.2)	30.2 (86.4)	29.0 (84.2)	25.6 (78.1)	20.6 (69.1)	16.1 (61.0)	14.5 (58.1)	30.2 (86.4)
Mean daily maximum °C (°F)	8.1 (46.6)	8.8 (47.8)	10.4 (50.7)	13.3 (55.9)	16.2 (61.2)	18.4 (65.1)	19.6 (67.3)	19.2 (66.6)	17.2 (63.0)	13.7 (56.7)	10.4 (50.7)	8.4 (47.1)	13.7 (56.7)
Daily mean °C (°F)	5.0 (41.0)	5.2 (41.4)	6.6 (43.9)	8.7 (47.7)	11.4 (52.5)	14.0 (57.2)	15.5 (59.9)	15.2 (59.4)	13.2 (55.8)	10.1 (50.2)	7.1 (44.8)	5.3 (41.5)	9.8 (49.6)
Mean daily minimum °C (°F)	2.0 (35.6)	1.7 (35.1)	2.8 (37.0)	4.2 (39.6)	6.6 (43.9)	9.6 (49.3)	11.5 (52.7)	11.2 (52.2)	9.1 (48.4)	6.5 (43.7)	3.8 (38.8)	2.1 (35.8)	5.9 (42.6)
Record low °C (°F)	−14.5 (5.9)	−11.7 (10.9)	−9.5 (14.9)	−7.0 (19.4)	−3.0 (26.6)	−2.1 (28.2)	0.2 (32.4)	0.8 (33.4)	−1.6 (29.1)	−5.5 (22.1)	−7.9 (17.8)	−14.2 (6.4)	−14.5 (5.9)
Average precipitation mm (inches)	102.4 (4.03)	83.1 (3.27)	76.8 (3.02)	65.2 (2.57)	70.8 (2.79)	69.6 (2.74)	87.6 (3.45)	101.3 (3.99)	76.9 (3.03)	107.7 (4.24)	105.5 (4.15)	117.1 (4.61)	1,064 (41.89)
Average precipitation days (≥ 1.0 mm)	17.1	14.4	14.5	13.0	13.1	12.3	14.6	15.8	14.5	15.6	16.6	17.2	178.6
Mean monthly sunshine hours	43.7	67.6	101.7	142.4	169.5	140.4	121.7	124.5	104.2	82.7	52.6	32.8	1,183.8
Source 1: Met Office
Source 2: Starlings Roost Weather

== Education ==
=== Primary level ===
Lisnaskea has the county's only Irish medium preschool and primary school. Naíscoil agus Búnscoil an Traonaigh.

Primary schools in the area in St Eugene's Knocks Primary School, The Moat Primary School and St Ronan's Primary School.

=== Secondary level ===
At second level, St Kevin's College (also known as St Kevin's Secondary School) is located at Derryree in Lisnaskea. It was formed, in 2017, following the merger of St Comhghall's College (a Roman Catholic school in Lisnaskea which operated from 1970 until 2017) and St Eugene's College in Rosslea.

Another school, Lisnaskea High School (Castle Balfour Demesne), was the town's only non-Catholic high school. It was amalgamated with nearby Devenish College in 2013. Since then, 75% of the school's students transferred to Devenish College, with other students transferring to Erne Integrated College and Fivemiletown High School.

=== Libraries ===
A new public library was opened in Main Street on 8 April 2015 by Libraries NI at a cost of £1.28m. It is spread over two floors with a special children's library and conference rooms.

== Transport ==
Lisnaskea railway station opened on 26 August 1858 and was shut on 1 October 1957. The station was opened by the Dundalk and Enniskillen Railway, later named the Irish North Western Railway. In 1876 it became part of the Great Northern Railway (Ireland).

== Demographics ==
National Identity of Lisnaskea residents (2021)
Nationality	Per cent
Irish	50.8%
Northern Irish	27.8%
British	20.3%

=== 2021 census ===
On census day in 2021, the usually resident population of Lisnaskea Settlement was 3,020. Of these:

- 76.09% belong to or were brought up in the Catholic religion and 18.97% belong to or were brought up in a 'Protestant and Other Christian (including Christian related)' religion.
- 16.59% indicated that they had a British only identity, 47.21% had an Irish only identity and 22.88% had a Northern Irish only identity.

=== 2011 census ===
On census day 2011 (27 March 2011), the usually resident population of Lisnaskea Settlement was 2,956, accounting for 0.16% of the NI total.

- 98.51% were from the white (including Irish Traveller) ethnic group;
- 75.61% belong to or were brought up in the Catholic religion and 22.43% belong to or were brought up in a 'Protestant and Other Christian (including Christian related)' religion; and
- 23.65% indicated that they had a British national identity, 43.27% had an Irish national identity and 30.82% had a Northern Irish national identity. Respondents could indicate more than one national identity
- 16.21% had some knowledge of Irish;
- 2.48% had some knowledge of Ulster-Scots; and
- 4.68% did not have English as their first language.

=== 2001 census ===
Lisnaskea is classified as an intermediate settlement by the NI Statistics and Research Agency (NISRA) (i.e. with population between 2,250 and 4,500 people). On census day 2001 (29 April 2001), there were 2,739 people living in Lisnaskea. Of these:

- 23.5% were aged under 16 years and 18.9% were aged 60 and over
- 46.8% of the population were male and 53.2% were female
- 74.1% were from a Catholic background and 24.5% were from a Protestant background
- 7.0% of people aged 16–74 were unemployed.

== Notable people ==
- Arlene Foster (born 1970), former First Minister of Northern Ireland and former Leader of the DUP, Baroness Foster of Aghadrumsee. As a child, she moved with her family to Lisnaskea.
- Rachel Horne (born 1979), journalist and newsreader with Virgin Radio UK. She previously worked for BBC News. She was raised near Lisnaskea, and is married to the comedian and television presenter Alex Horne.
- Seán Lynch (born 1954), Sinn Féin politician who was an MLA for Fermanagh and South Tyrone from 2011 until 2021. He was formerly a member of the Provisional IRA. Lynch was raised on the outskirts of Lisnaskea, and he continues to live in the town.
- Frank Maguire, MP for Fermanagh and South Tyrone from 1974 to 1981, ran a pub in the town.
- Áine Murphy, a Sinn Féin politician who has served as an MLA for Fermanagh and South Tyrone since 2011. She is from Lisnaskea.
- Johnny Patterson (1840–1889), circus showman and songwriter lived for a time in the village. He wrote many popular songs including The garden where the praties grow and The stone outside Dan Murphy's door.
