= Tiranny =

Tiranny Tuath Threana(Irish)
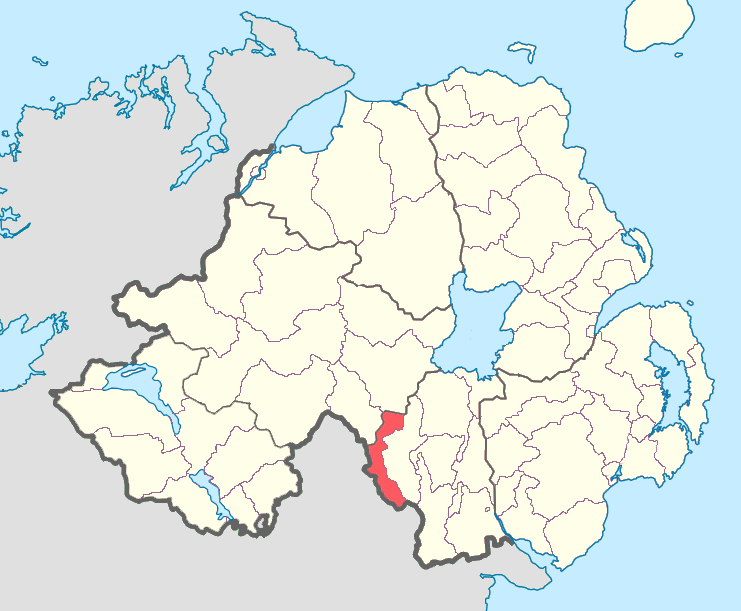
- Location of Tiranny, County Armagh, Northern Ireland.
- Sovereign state: United Kingdom
- Country: Northern Ireland
- County: Armagh

Tiranny (from Irish Tuath Threana, meaning 'territory of Trena') is a barony in County Armagh, Northern Ireland. It lies on the western boundary of the county, bordering County Tyrone to its west and County Monaghan in the Republic of Ireland to its south. It is bordered by three other baronies in Northern Ireland: Dungannon Lower and Dungannon Upper to the north-west; and Armagh to the east. It also borders two baronies in the Republic of Ireland; Cremorne to the south and Trough to the west.

== Etymology ==
The name Tiranny is a softened form of Toughranie, an anglicisation of Tuath Threana. The form Tiranny was created by the Ordnance Survey and led to the incorrect conjecture by some such as John O'Donovan that the first element of the name derived from the Irish word tír, meaning "country".

Older phonetic forms of Tuatha Threna included Toaghrany, Toyghrayny, Toaghraine, Toaghranye, Towrany, Tuterany, Toghrany, Toorany, Turrany, and Torany, all of which are found in records from the early seventeenth century.

The second element Threna is derived from the Uí Threna (English: descendants of Trena), the name of a tribe that settled on the western boundaries of modern County Armagh, where the barony of Tiranny is located. In various Elizabethan maps of Ulster, they are recorded in the anglicised forms of O'Traney, O'Trany, Outraine, and Traney, before the term Tuath Threana was used.

== History ==
The Uí Threna were descended from Trena, the great-grandson of Colla Fo Chrí, one of the Three Collas, and where part of the over-kingdom of Airgíalla.

In the north-east of Tiranny, south of the River Blackwater there was a sub-territory called Clanaul, the original name of the parish of Eglish. The name is preserved in the form Glenaul which was used as the name for the local district electoral division of the former Armagh Poor Law Union. The name derives from the Irish Cluain Dabhail, which means "meadow of Dabhal", noted as the ancient name of the River Blackwater. Clanaul is also recorded as Clandavle, and in the Tynan Charter of 1455 as Clondowyll.

To the east of Tiranny lay the territory of Tuath Echach (English: territory of Aughy), anglicised as Tooaghy, now the barony of Armagh. It takes its name from the Uí Echach (English: tribe of Aughy), whose ancestor Echach was the brother of Trena the ancestor of the Uí Threna. They are also recorded as the Uí Eochaidh.

== List of settlements ==
Below is a list of settlements in Tiranny:

- Middletown
- Tynan

== List of civil parishes ==
Below is a list of civil parishes in Tiranny:

- Eglish (split with barony of Armagh)
- Derrynoose (also partly in barony of Armagh)
- Keady (also partly in barony of Armagh)
- Tynan (also partly in barony of Armagh)
