= Camlough Fault =

Geological fault in Northern Ireland

Camlough Fault is a NNW–SSE–trending dextral (right-lateral) strike-slip fault in County Armagh, Northern Ireland. It forms part of a broader network of Cenozoic faults across the province. Aeromagnetic and gravity surveys show that it displaces the Palaeogene Slieve Gullion Complex ring-dyke by about 2 km. To the north-north-west it links with the Markethill Fault, although its surface trace is buried beneath Oligocene Lough Neagh Group sediments. To the east the fault steps roughly 10 km to become the Portrush Fault, and to the south-east it cuts the Carlingford Complex, where its position is marked by strong magnetic anomalies. These right-lateral movements record significant Cenozoic deformation driven by both Alpine compression and mantle plume-related extension.

In the Mid-Palaeocene, movement on the Camlough Fault helped form the Lough Neagh pull-apart basin. This focused subsidence beneath the modern lake and allowed unusually thick sequences of Palaeogene basalts and overlying Oligocene clays to accumulate.

Further north-east, the fault is defined by a sudden shift in Silurian strike at Thompson's Bridge (from E–W to E 40° N). Bailey & McCallien note that it shows dextral offset at the reservoir but sinistral movement at Flurrybridge, suggesting distinct block movements on either side of the fault. During the last glaciation, ice flow exploited the Camlough Fault zone to scour out the valley now occupied by the narrow ribbon lake Cam Lough, the fault acting as a line of weakness that guided glacial erosion.

== See also ==
- List of geological faults in Northern Ireland
