= Kinnegoe Fault =

Geological fault in County Armagh, Northern Ireland

Coordinates: 54.47945°N 7.93904°W

Kinnegoe Fault is a geological fault in County Armagh, Northern Ireland.

== See also ==
- List of geological faults in Northern Ireland
