= Devenish College =

Coordinates: 54.338°N 7.635°W

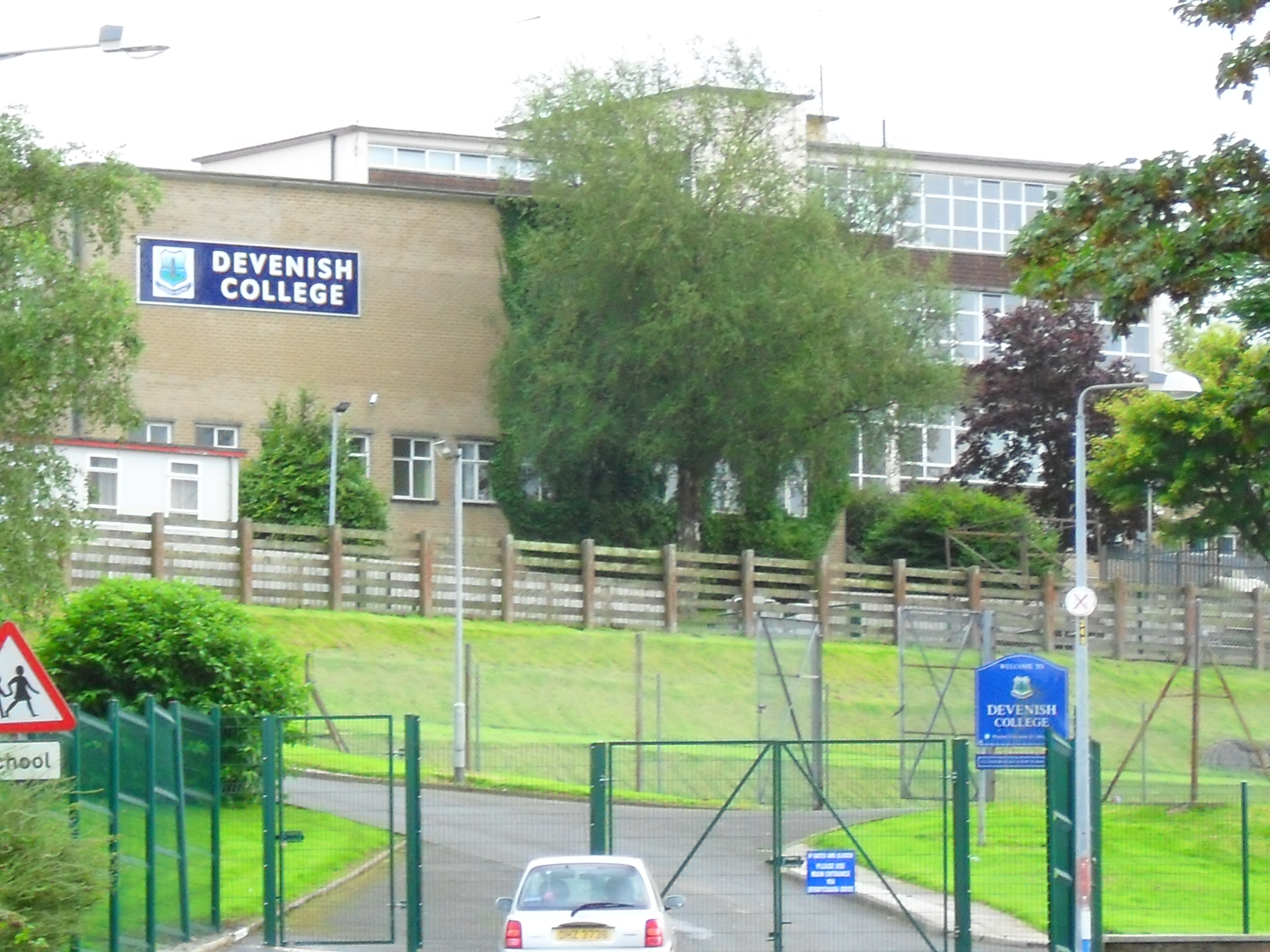

Location
- 151 Tempo Road; Enniskillen, County Fermanagh, BT74 6JL; Northern Ireland

Information
- Type: Controlled school
- Established: 2004
- Principal: Simon Mowbray
- Gender: Co-educational
- Age: 11 to 18
- Houses: Caldwell, Crom, Necarne and Tully
- Website: http://www.devenishcollege.com/

Devenish College is a secondary school located in Enniskillen, County Fermanagh, Northern Ireland. It lies within the Western Education Authority area.

In October 2023 the school moved to a new campus in the Tempo Road area. It was originally planned for construction in 2007. Construction began in 2019. After construction began, the build was later delayed several times due to the COVID-19 pandemic, originally to be completed by November 2021. It cost £25.6m.

== Notable former pupils ==
- Roy Carroll (Derby County and former Northern Ireland & Manchester United goalkeeper)
- Kyle Lafferty (Northern Ireland and Rangers F.C. striker)
