= Pettigoe Fault =

Geological fault in County Tyrone, Northern Ireland

Coordinates: 54.66772°N 7.69079°W

Pettigoe Fault is a geological fault in County Tyrone, Northern Ireland.

== See also ==
- List of geological faults in Northern Ireland
