= Clankelly =

Clankelly Clann Cheallaigh (Irish)
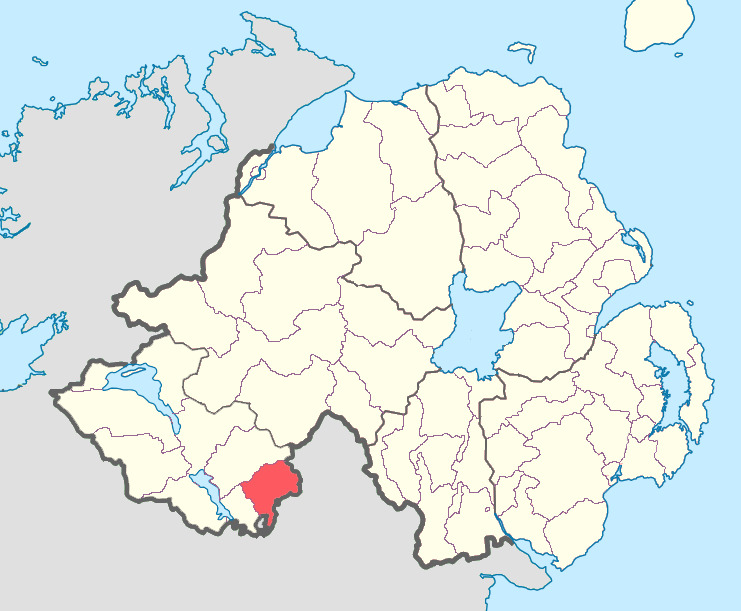
- Location of Clankelly, County Fermanagh, Northern Ireland.
- Sovereign state: United Kingdom
- Country: Northern Ireland
- County: Fermanagh

Clankelly (Irish: Clann Cheallaigh, meaning Clan Kelly or, more literally, 'Offspring of Ceallaigh') is a barony in County Fermanagh, Northern Ireland. It is the only barony in County Fermanagh not connected to Lough Erne. It is bordered by two other baronies in Northern Ireland: Coole to the south-west; and Magherastephana to the north-west. It also borders two baronies in the Republic of Ireland: Monaghan to the north-east; and Dartree to the south-east.

== History ==
Clankelly takes its name from Cellach, son of Tuathal, a king of the Ui Chremthainn. The MacDonnell (Irish: Mac Domhnaill) sept of the Clann Cheallaigh are noted here, and by the 13th century, the O'Cannons (Irish: Ó Canannain), who had been ousted as kings of Cinel Conaill, settled here for a period.

== List of main settlements ==
- Rosslea

== List of civil parishes ==
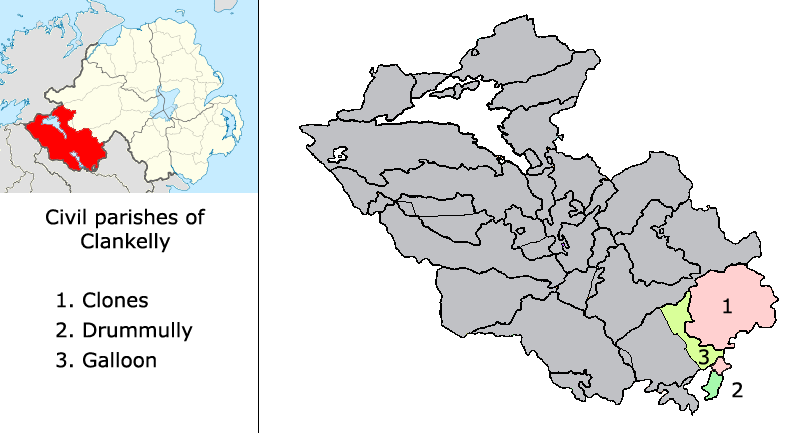
Civil parishes within the barony of Clankelly, County Fermanagh, Northern Ireland

Below is a list of civil parishes in Clankelly:

- Clones
- Drummully (split with barony of Coole)
- Galloon (split with baronies of Coole and Knockninny)
