= Clogher Valley Fault =

Geological fault in Northern Ireland

Coordinates: 54.35074°N 8.84658°W

Clogher Valley Fault is a geological fault in County Fermanagh, Northern Ireland. The focus of deformation during the Variscan Orogenic Cycle in Northern Ireland was located on, and between, two major faults. In the north is the northern-bounding fault of the Midland Valley Terrane, the Castle Archdale Fault-Omagh Thrust Fault zone, while in the south is the Clogher Valley Fault. Carboniferous rocks located between these faults were affected by strike-slip, associated with intermittent dextral transpression and transtension. Between the Clogher Valley Fault and the Southern Upland Fault, the southern bounding fault of the Midland Valley Terrane, the Carboniferous rocks are relatively undeformed.

== See also ==
- List of geological faults in Northern Ireland
