= Dartree =

Dartree Dartraí
- Barony
- Interactive map of Dartree
- Sovereign state: Ireland
- County: Monaghan

Area
  - Total: 241.23 km^{2} (93.14 sq mi)

Dartree (Irish: Dartraí) is a barony in County Monaghan, Ireland.

== Etymology ==
Dartree is known in Irish as Dartraí from the ancient kingdom Dartraighe, named after the n-Dartraighi or Dairtre people.

== Location ==
Dartree barony is in the west of County Monaghan. It is bordered to the northeast by Monaghan barony; to the southeast by Cremorne barony (both in County Monaghan); to the west by Clankelly, County Fermanagh; and to the south by Tullygarvey, County Cavan.

== List of settlements ==
- Clones
- Drum
- Newbliss
- Rockcorry
- Scotshouse
