= Great Gaw Fault =

Great Gaw Fault is a geological fault in County Antrim, Northern Ireland.

== See also ==
- List of geological faults in Northern Ireland
