= Cremorne (barony) =

Cremorne Críoch Mhúrn (Irish)
- Barony
- Interactive map of Cremorne
- Sovereign state: Ireland
- County: Monaghan

Area
  - Total: 341.99 km^{2} (132.04 sq mi)

Cremorne (Irish: Críoch Mhúrn) is a barony in County Monaghan, Ireland.

== Etymology ==
Cremorne is known in Irish as Críoch Mhúrn from the Old Irish Crích Mugdornd, border of the Mugdorna (Murnú), a pre-Celtic or early Celtic people who inhabited much of Ulster before being pushed out by the Gailenga. This people also give their name to the Mourne Mountains and Mourne barony.

== Location ==
Cremorne is found in east County Monaghan.

Cremorne barony is bordered to the north by Monaghan; to the northwest by Dartree; to the south by Farney (all the preceding are also in County Monaghan); to the east by Tiranny, Upper Fews and Armagh, County Armagh; and to the southwest by Clankee and Tullygarvey, County Cavan.

== History ==
Up to about AD 800, the Mugdorna territory stretched from Monaghan to the River Boyne at Navan. O'Hanraghty (O hInnreachtaigh) settled in this barony from Ui Meith Macha in County Louth following the Norman invasion. The Leslie family is cited in more recent times as Earl of Rothes.

== List of settlements ==
Below is a list of settlements in Cremorne barony:

- Annyalla
- Ballybay
- Castleblayney
- Clontibret
