= Belcoo Fault =

Geological fault in County Fermanagh, Northern Ireland

Coordinates: 54.312°N 7.810°W

Belcoo Fault is a geological fault in County Fermanagh, Northern Ireland.

== See also ==
- List of geological faults in Northern Ireland
