= Newry Fault =

Geological fault in County Armagh, Northern Ireland

Coordinates: 54.19860°N 6.34589°W

Newry Fault is a geological fault in County Armagh, Northern Ireland.

== See also ==
- List of geological faults in Northern Ireland
