= Carnlough Fault =

Geological fault in Northern Ireland

Coordinates: 54.90401°N 6.05204°W

Carnlough Fault is a geological fault in County Antrim, Northern Ireland.

== See also ==
- List of geological faults in Northern Ireland
