= Killadeas–Seskinore Fault =

Coordinates: 54.49400°N 8.91126°W

The Killadeas–Seskinore Fault is a geological fault in County Fermanagh, Northern Ireland.

== See also ==
- List of geological faults in Northern Ireland
