= Elagh Fault =

Geological fault in County Tyrone, Northern Ireland

Coordinates: 54.59809°N 6.68562°W

Elagh Fault is a geological fault in County Tyrone, Northern Ireland.

== See also ==
- List of geological faults in Northern Ireland
