= Omagh Fault =

Omagh Fault is a geological fault in County Tyrone, Northern Ireland.

== See also ==
- List of geological faults in Northern Ireland
