= Tempo–Sixmilecross Fault =

Geological fault in County Fermanagh, Northern Ireland

Coordinates: 54.37047°N 7.46224°W

Tempo–Sixmilecross Fault is a geological fault in County Fermanagh, Northern Ireland.

== See also ==
- List of geological faults in Northern Ireland
