= Derrynoose =

Village in County Armagh, Northern Ireland

Coordinates: 54.235°N 6.774°W

Derrynoose: Irish: Doire Núis
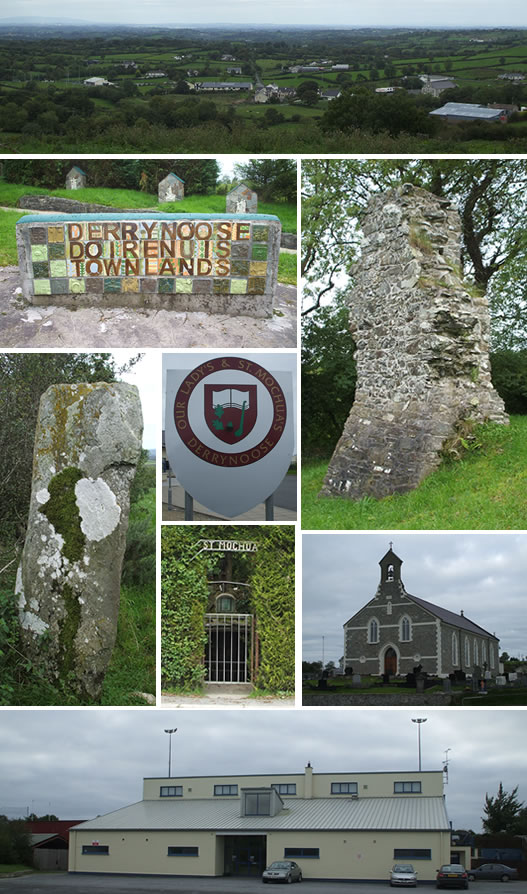
- Clockwise from top: Central Derrynoose as viewed from the standing stone, the remaining wall of the old chapel, the local chapel, the community centre/GAA club building, the standing stone, the stations of the cross, the heraldic shield of Our Lady's and St Mochua's Primary School and the entrance to the holy well.

- Location within Northern Ireland
- Population: 2,956 (2001 Census)
- Irish grid reference: H800300
- District: Armagh City, Banbridge and Craigavon
- County: County Armagh
- Country: Northern Ireland
- Sovereign state: United Kingdom
- Post town: KEADY
- Postcode district: BT60
- Dialling code: 028
- UK Parliament: Newry and Armagh
- NI Assembly: Newry and Armagh

Derrynoose (from Irish Doire Núis, meaning 'oakwood of new milk') is a village and civil parish in south County Armagh, Northern Ireland, 4.5 km south-west of Keady.

The village lies partly in the townland of Mullyard (in the civil parish of Derrynoose) and partly in the townland of Crossnamoyle (in the civil parish of Keady). The civil parish is situated in the historic baronies of Armagh and Tiranny and is within the Armagh City and District Council area.

== History ==
Derrynoose was one of several Catholic border villages in Armagh that would have been transferred to the Irish Free State had the recommendations of the Irish Boundary Commission been enacted in 1925.

== Demography ==
Derrynoose is classed as Rural according to the Statistical Classification and Delineation of Settlements Report 2005. On Census Day 29 April 2001 the resident population of Derrynoose ward was 2,956. Of this population,

- 30.1% were under 16 years old and 12.3% were aged 60 and above.
- 84.3% identified as Catholic and 15.4% as Protestant or other Christian background.

== Services ==
The nearest hospital to Derrynoose is Daisy Hill Hospital. Primary education is provided by Our Lady's & St Mochua's Primary School.

The local GAA club, St Mochua's (Cumann Naomh Mochua), is the main sporting outlet for the community and plays Gaelic Football in the Intermediate league and championship in Armagh and hurling in the Senior league and championship. The local community centre and GAA club use the same building, where facilities include a social club bar and kitchen facilities.

There was formerly a locally owned shop and post office. There are a few local businesses including A&M Commercials, The Derryvale Inn pub, Albert Keenan Coal & Oil Armagh Trading Ltd, and M&S Freight Forwarding Ltd.

== Places of interest ==
Places of interest include "The Standing Stone", St Mochua's Well, "The Stations of The Cross", St Mochua's Chapel, "The Old Chapel Ruins and Graveyard", The Emigration Stone and Listrakelt Fort. The site of the medieval parish church is marked by the ruins of a church built about 1622 in the townland of Listarkelt.

== Civil parish of Derrynoose ==
The civil parish is sometimes known as Maddan, where the present Church of Ireland church is located. The civil parish contains the village of Derrynoose.

=== Townlands ===
The civil parish contains the following townlands:

- Ballynagolan
- Brootally
- Carnagh
- Cargalisgorran
- Carrickabolie
- Carryhugh
- Cormeen
- Crossbane
- Crossreagh (also known as Doohat)
- Dernalea
- Derryhennet
- Doohat (also known as Crossreagh)
- Drumacanver
- Drumgar
- Drumgreenagh
- Drumherney
- Drumhirk
- Drummeland
- Drumnahavil
- Farnaloy
- Fergort
- Kilcreevy Etra
- Kilcreevy Otra
- Killyreavy
- Knockrevan
- Lisdrumbrughas
- Lisglynn
- Lislea
- Lissagally
- Listarkelt
- Maddan
- Maghery Kilcrany
- Mowillin
- Mullyard
- Roughan
- Rowan
- Tamlaght
- Tivnacree
- Tullycallidy
- Tullyhirm

== See also ==
- List of civil parishes of County Armagh
