= Laghy Fault =

Geological fault in County Tyrone, Northern Ireland

Coordinates: 54.70397°N 7.86114°W

Laghy Fault is a geological fault in County Tyrone, Northern Ireland.

== See also ==
- List of geological faults in Northern Ireland
