= List of Advanced Level subjects =

This is a list of Advanced Level (usually referred to as A-Level) subjects.

== A ==
- Accounting
- Afrikaans
- Ancient History
- Art and Design
- Arabic

== B ==
- Bengali
- Biblical Hebrew
- Biblical Studies
- Biology
- Built Environment
- Business

== C ==
- Chemistry
- Chinese
- Classical Civilisation
- Classical Greek
- Criminology
- Computer Science

== D ==
- Dance
- Design and Technology
- Design and Textiles
- Digital Media and Design
- Digital Technology
- Drama
- Drama and Theatre

== E ==
- Economics
- Electronics
- English Language
- English Language and Literature
- English Literature
- Environmental Management
- Environmental Science
- Environmental Technology

== F ==
- Fashion and Textiles
- Food Science and Nutrition
- Film Studies
- French
- Further Mathematics

== G ==
- Geography
- Geology
- German
- Global Perspectives and Research
- Greek
- Gujarati

== H ==
- Health and Social Care
- Hindi
- Hinduism
- History
- History of Art

== I ==
- Information Technology
- Irish
- Islamic Studies
- Italian

== J ==
- Japanese
- Journalism

== L ==
- Latin
- Law
- Life and Health Sciences

== M ==
- Marine Science
- Mathematics
- Media Studies
- Modern Hebrew
- Moving Image Arts
- Music
- Music Technology

== P ==
- Punjabi
- Performing Arts
- Persian
- Philosophy
- Physical Education
- Physics
- Polish
- Politics
- Portuguese
- Product Design
- Psychology

== R ==
- Religious Studies
- Russian

== S ==
- Sociology
- Software Systems Development
- Spanish
- Sports Science
- Statistics

== T ==
- Tamil
- Thinking Skills
- Travel and Tourism
- Turkish

== U ==
- Urdu

== W ==
- Welsh

== Withdrawn subjects ==
- Anthropology
- Archaeology
- Citizenship Studies
- Classics
- Communication and Culture
- Creative Writing
- Critical Thinking
- Dutch
- Economics and Business
- Engineering
- General Studies
- Global Development (AS)
- Home Economics
- Human Biology
- Humanities
- Information and communication technology
- Leisure studies
- Performance studies
- Pure Mathematics
- Quantitative Methods (AS)
- Science in Society
- Use of Mathematics (AS)
- World Development

== See also ==
- List of CIE Advanced Level subjects
