= Trough (barony) =

Truagh An Triúcha (Irish)
- Barony
- Interactive map of Truagh
- Sovereign state: Ireland
- County: Monaghan

Area
  - Total: 151.26 km^{2} (58.40 sq mi)

Truagh (/ˈtruː/; Irish: An Triúcha) is a barony in the north of County Monaghan in Ireland.

== Etymology ==
Trough or Truagh is known in Irish as An Triúcha (Old Irish trícha cét, "cantred").

== Location ==
Trough is found in north County Monaghan, south of the Ulster Blackwater.

Trough barony is bordered to the south by Monaghan, County Monaghan; to the northwest by Clogher, County Tyrone; and to the northeast by Lower Dungannon, County Tyrone.

== History ==
The Mac Kenna were chiefs of Trough. O'Clerkin is also noted here.

== List of settlements ==
Below is a list of settlements in Trough barony:

- Emyvale
- Glaslough
