= List of Cambridge International Examinations Advanced Level subjects =

Following are the disciplines in which Cambridge International Examinations (CIE) of Cambridge Assessment (UCLES) offers General Certificate of Education (GCE) Advanced Level and/or Advanced Subsidiary Level (AS/A Level) qualifications:

Syllabus Code	Course Title	Notes
CIE 8001	General Paper	AS Level only
CIE 8004	General Paper	AS Level only
CIE 8024	Nepal Studies	AS Level only
CIE 8041	Divinity	AS Level only
CIE 8053	Islamic Studies	AS Level only
CIE 8058	Hinduism	AS Level only
CIE 8274	Language and Literature in English (US)	available in the US only under the BES pilot; AS Level only; available from 2013
CIE 8275	Global Perspectives (US)	available in the US only under the BES pilot; AS Level only; available from 2013
CIE 8276	French Language (US)	available in the US only under the BES pilot; AS Level only; available from 2013
CIE 8277	French Literature (US)	available in the US only under the BES pilot; AS Level only; available from 2013
CIE 8278	Spanish Language (US)	available in the US only under the BES pilot; AS Level only; available from 2013
CIE 8279	Spanish Literature (US)	available in the US only under the BES pilot; AS Level only; available from 2013
CIE 8281	Japanese Language	AS Level only
CIE 8283	Classical Studies	AS Level only; expired in 2011
CIE 8287	English Language (US)	available in the US only under the BES pilot; AS Level only; available from 2013
CIE 8290	Environmental Science	AS Level only
CIE 8291	Environmental Management	AS Level only
CIE 8436	Thinking Skills	AS Level only; expired in 2007
CIE 8660	Research Project	AS Level only
CIE 8663	Music	AS Level only
CIE 8664	Portuguese	expired in 2006
CIE 8665	Spanish – First Language	AS Level only
CIE 8666	Physical Education	AS Level only
CIE 8667	Afrikaans Literature	AS Level only; expired
CIE 8668	Arabic Literature	AS Level only; expired
CIE 8669	Chinese Literature	AS Level only
CIE 8670	French Literature	AS Level only
CIE 8671	German Literature	AS Level only; expired
CIE 8672	Portuguese literature	AS Level only
CIE 8673	Spanish Literature	AS Level only
CIE 8674	Urdu Literature	AS Level only; expired
CIE 8675	Hindi Literature	AS Level only
CIE 8679	Afrikaans Language	AS Level only
CIE 8680	Arabic Language	AS Level only
CIE 8681	Chinese Language	AS Level only
CIE 8682	French Language	AS Level only
CIE 8683	German Language	AS Level only
CIE 8684	Portuguese Language	AS Level only
CIE 8685	Spanish Language	AS Level only
CIE 8686	Urdu language	AS Level only; available in November only
CIE 8687	Hindi Language	AS Level only
CIE 8688	Marathi Language	AS Level only
CIE 8689	Tamil Language	AS Level only
CIE 8690	Telugu Language	AS Level only
CIE 8693	English Language	AS Level only; expired in 2013 (replaced with syllabus 9093)
CIE 8695	Language and Literature in English	AS Level only
CIE 8703	Music	AS Level only; available in May only; expired in 2006
CIE 8719	Higher Mathematics	expired in 2006
CIE 8779	Afrikaans – First Language	AS Level only
CIE 8780	Physical Science	AS Level only; available in November only; available from 2011
CIE 8922	Diploma in Business	A Level only; expired in 2004
CIE 8923	Career award in Business	A Level only; expired in 2003
CIE 8928 – 8229	Diploma in Business	A Level only
CIE 8928 – 8229	Diploma in ICT Skills	A Level only
CIE 8987	Global Perspectives	AS Level only; available from 2012
CIE 9011	Divinity	A Level only
CIE 9012	?	
CIE 9013	Islamic Studies	A Level only
CIE 9014	Hinduism	A Level only
CIE 9018	Syariah	A Level only
CIE 9019	Usuluddin	A Level only
CIE 9084	Law	
CIE 9089	History (US)	available in the US only under the BES pilot; available from 2015; replaces syllabus 9279
CIE 9093	English Language	available from 2014; replaced syllabus 8693
CIE 9183	Art and Design (US)	available in the US only under the BES pilot; available from 2013
CIE 9184	Biology (US)	available in the US only under the BES pilot; available from 2013
CIE 9185	Chemistry (US)	available in the US only under the BES pilot; available from 2013
CIE 9186	Bahasa Melayu	available in Brunei only
CIE 9231	Further Mathematics	A Level only
CIE 9274	Classical Studies	available from 2011
CIE 9275	Economics (US)	available in the US only under the BES pilot; available from 2013
CIE 9276	Literature in English (US)	available in the US only under the BES pilot; available from 2013
CIE 9277	Physics (US)	available in the US only under the BES pilot; available from 2013
CIE 9278	Geography (US)	available in the US only under the BES pilot; available from 2013
CIE 9279	History (US)	available in the US only under the BES pilot; available from 2013; expires in 2014 (will be replaced with syllabus 9089)
CIE 9280	Mathematics (US)	available in the US only under the BES pilot; available from 2013
CIE 9281	French (US)	available in the US only under the BES pilot; A Level only; available from 2013
CIE 9282	Spanish (US)	available in the US only under the BES pilot; A Level only; available from 2013
CIE 9332	Dress and Textiles	A Level only; expired in 2008
CIE 9336	Food studies	A Level only
CIE 9351	Geometrical and Mechanical Drawing	A Level only; expired in 2007
CIE 9385	Music (US)	available in the US only under the BES pilot; available from 2013
CIE 9389	History	available from 2015; replaced syllabus 9697
CIE 9395	Travel and Tourism	
CIE 9396	Physical Education	available in November only; available from 2010
CIE 9631	Design and Textiles	
CIE 9608	Computer Science	to be replaced by CIE 9618 (Computer Science) by 2022
CIE 9618	Computer Science	
CIE 9626	Information Technology	available from 2017; replaced syllabus 9713
CIE 9676	Urdu	A Level only
CIE 9679	Afrikaans	A Level only
CIE 9680	Arabic	A Level only
CIE 9686	Urdu – Pakistan only	A Level only
CIE 9687	Hindi	A Level only
CIE 9688	Marathi	A Level only
CIE 9689	Tamil	A Level only
CIE 9690	Telugu	A Level only
CIE 9691	Computing	
CIE 9692	?	
CIE 9693	Marine Science	
CIE 9694	Thinking Skills	available from 2007
CIE 9695	Literature in English	
CIE 9696	Geography	
CIE 9697	History	expired in 2014 (replaced with syllabus 9389)
CIE 9698	Psychology	
CIE 9699	Sociology	
CIE 9700	Biology	
CIE 9701	Chemistry	
CIE 9702	Physics	
CIE 9703	Music	
CIE 9704	Art and Design	
CIE 9705	Design and Technology	
CIE 9706	Accounting	
CIE 9609	Business Studies	
CIE 9708	Economics	
CIE 9709	Mathematics	
CIE 9713	Applied ICT	expired in 2017 (replaced with syllabus 9626)
CIE 9714	?	
CIE 9715	Chinese	A Level only
CIE 9716	French	A Level only
CIE 9717	German	A Level only
CIE 9718	Portuguese	A Level only
CIE 9719	Spanish	A Level only

== See also ==
- University of Cambridge International Examinations – CIE
- Cambridge Assessment – UCLES
- Advanced/Advanced Subsidiary Level – AS/A Level
- List of Advanced Level subjects
