= Aghalurcher =

Civil parish in Northern Ireland

Coordinates: 54.23°N 7.444°W

- Civil parish
- Location within Ireland
- Jurisdiction: Northern Ireland
- Province: Ulster
- County: County Fermanagh
- Barony: Magherastephana

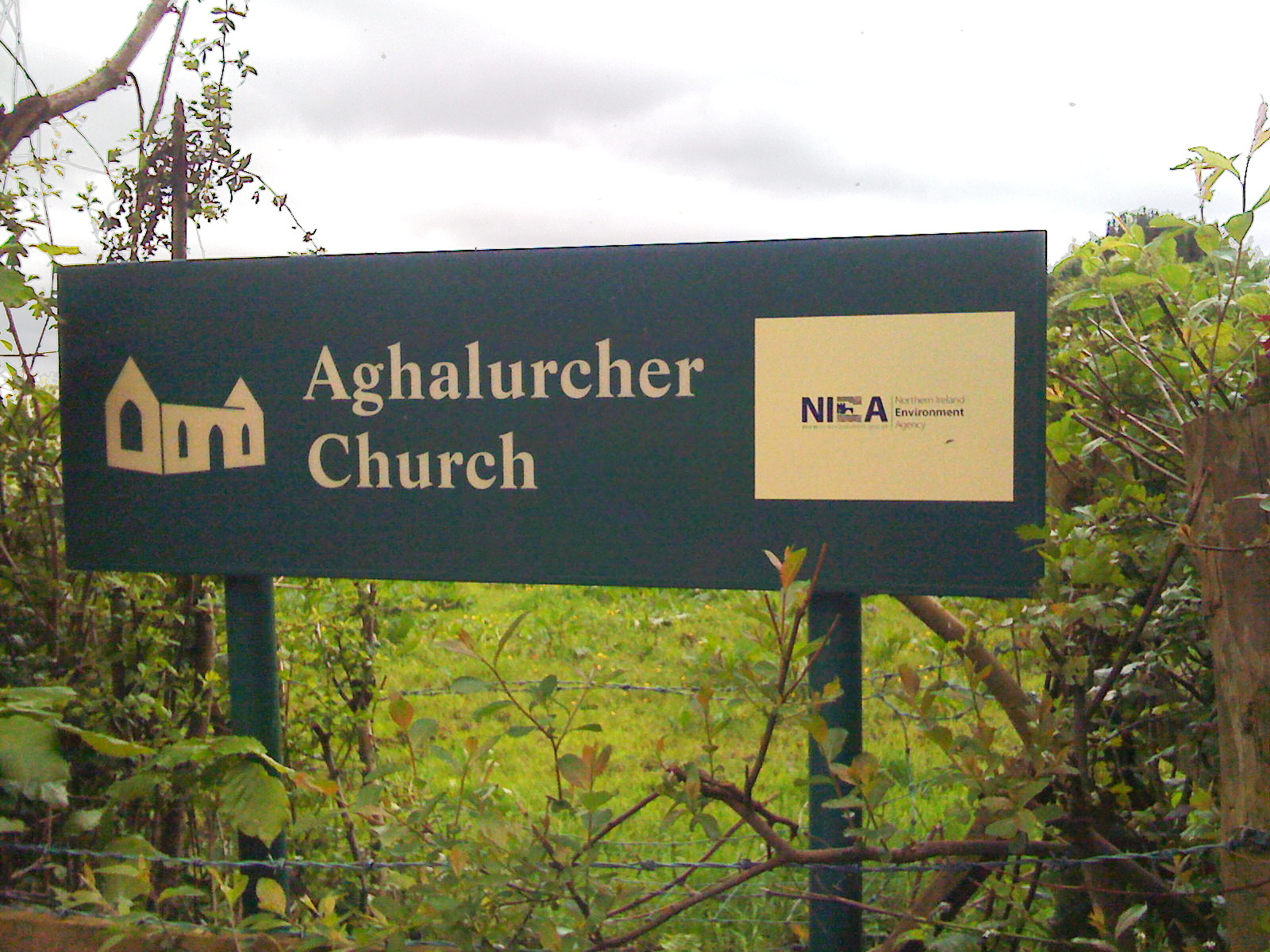
Sign on right side of road indicates entrance to church grounds

Aghalurcher is a civil parish located mainly in the barony of Magherastephana in County Fermanagh and partly in the barony of Clogher in County Tyrone, Northern Ireland.

== Townlands of Aghalurcher in County Fermanagh ==
The parish comprises the following 239 townlands in County Fermanagh:

- Acres
- Aghacramphill
- Aghalurcher Glebe
- Aghamore North
- Aghamore South
- Aghavoory
- Agheeghter
- Aghinure
- Aghnaskew
- Altagoaghan
- Altawark
- Altmartin
- Altnaponer
- Atnamollyboy
- Attybaron
- Attyclannabryan
- Ballymacaffry
- Ballymakenny
- Barnhill
- Bohattan
- Boleyhill
- Brobrohan
- Bunnahesco
- Bunnahola Island
- Carrickawick
- Carrickmacosker
- Carricknabrattoge
- Carrickpolin
- Carrowgarragh
- Carrowhony
- Castle Balfour Demesne
- Cavanagarvan
- Cavanaleck
- Claraghy
- Clay
- Cleen
- Cleenriss
- Clonmacfelimy
- Coalhill
- Colebrook Demesne
- Comaghy
- Congo
- Coolaran
- Coolbeg
- Coolcrannel
- Coollane
- Cooltrane
- Cooneen
- Corfannan
- Corlacky
- Corlough
- Cornakessagh
- Cornarooslan
- Cornashannel
- Cornashee
- Corrachrow
- Corraclare
- Corradillar
- Corralongford
- Corranewy
- Corrard
- Cran
- Creaghamanone Island
- Creaghanameelta Island
- Creaghanarourke Island
- Creaghanchreesty Island
- Creaghawaddy Island
- Croaghan
- Crockadreen
- Crockaness
- Crocknagowan
- Crocknagrally
- Crocknanane
- Crummy
- Curragh
- Curraghfad
- Currogs
- Curryann
- Cushwash
- Derrintony
- Derryasna
- Derrychaan
- Derrychulla
- Derrycorban
- Derrycrum
- Derrycullion
- Derryhurdin
- Derryloman
- Derrynavogy
- Derryree
- Doocharn
- Dooederny
- Doogary
- Dooross
- Drumany
- Drumbad Beg
- Drumbad More
- Drumbaghlin
- Drumbrughas North
- Drumbrughas South
- Drumcon
- Drumcoo
- Drumcramph
- Drumcrin
- Drumcru
- Drumcunny
- Drumgoon
- Drumguiff
- Drumhack
- Drumharriff
- Drumhaw
- Drumleagues Big
- Drumleagues Little
- Drumliff
- Drumlught
- Drummack
- Drummeer
- Drumroo
- Drumroosk
- Ederdacurragh
- Edergole
- Edergole Island
- Erdinagh
- Eshanummer
- Eshbane
- Eshbralley
- Eshcarcoge
- Eshmeen
- Eshnagorr
- Eshnascreen
- Eshnasillog Beg
- Eshnasillog More
- Eshthomas
- Eskeragh
- Farranaconaghy
- Farranacurky
- Farranasculloge
- Foglish
- Forfey
- Friar's Island
- Garvaghy
- Garvoghill
- Geddagh Island
- Glasdrumman
- Gortacharn
- Gortgarran
- Grogey
- Henrystughan
- Hollybrook
- Inishcorkish
- Inishcreenry (Island)
- Inishfausy
- Inishleague (Island)
- Irishcollan
- Inishore
- Inishroosk
- Inishturk
- Keenaghy
- Killarbran
- Killashanbally
- Killybane
- Killycloghy
- Killycrutteen
- Killygullan
- Killynamph
- Killypaddy
- Killyrover
- Kilmore North
- Kilmore South
- Kilronan
- Kiltenamullagh
- Kingstown
- Kinmore
- Knocks
- Knocks
- Lebally
- Legatillida
- Leraw
- Lisadearny
- Lisduff
- Lislea
- Lisnagole
- Lisoneill
- Littlehill
- Longfield
- Lough Hill
- Lurganbane
- Macknagh
- Millwood
- Moneymakinn
- Moneyneddy
- Mongibbaghan
- Moughley
- Mountjoy Island
- Mullaghfad
- Mullaghkeel or Ballymackilroy
- Mullaghmakervy
- Mullaghmore
- Mullynaburtlan
- Mullynascarty
- Mullynavale
- Munville
- Naan Island South
- Oghill
- Owenskerry
- Rabbit Island
- Rafintan
- Ramult
- Raw
- Rossbeg
- Rossgad
- Rossmacaffry
- Rossmacall
- Rossmacole
- Shanaghy
- Sheebeg
- Slush Hill
- Sraharory
- Stripe
- Tatteevagh
- Tattenabuddagh
- Tattenaheglish
- Tattenalee
- Tattinderry
- Tattynuckle
- Tattyreagh
- Tireeghan
- Tirenny
- Toney
- Trahanacarrick Island
- Trannish (Island)
- Tully North
- Tully South
- Tullykenneye
- Tullyneevin

== Townlands of Aghalurcher in County Tyrone ==
The parish comprises the following 17 townlands in County Tyrone:

- Alderwood
- Artclea
- Beagh
- Breakly
- Crockacleaven
- Crocknahull
- Cullentra
- Cullynane
- Kill
- Kiltermon
- Loughermore Glebe
- Mullaghmore
- Rahack Glebe
- Relessy
- Tattanellan
- Timpany
- Tircar

== See also ==
- List of civil parishes of County Fermanagh
- List of civil parishes of County Tyrone
- List of townlands in County Fermanagh
- List of townlands in County Tyrone
