= Magherastephana =

Magherastephana An Machaire Steafánach (Irish)
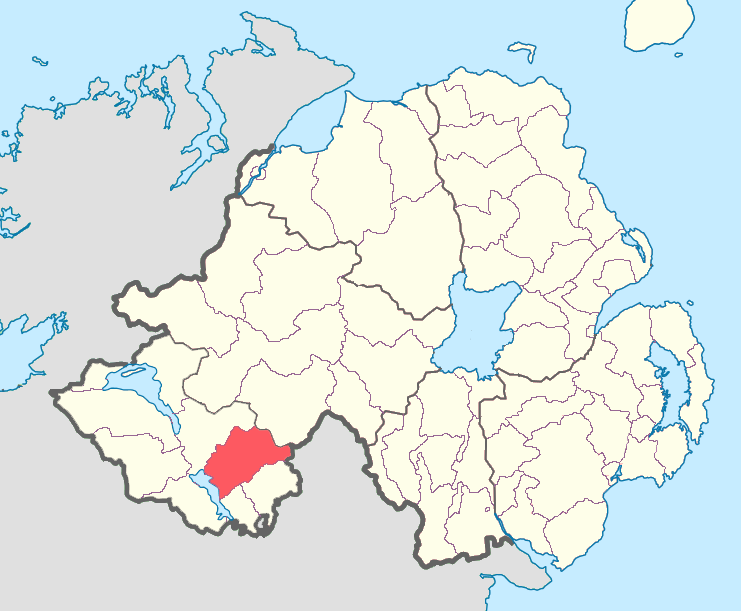
- Location of Magherastephana, County Fermanagh, Northern Ireland.
- Sovereign state: United Kingdom
- Jurisdiction: Northern Ireland
- Province: Ulster
- County: Fermanagh

Magherastephana is a barony in County Fermanagh, Northern Ireland. To its south-west lies Upper Lough Erne, and it is bordered by five other baronies: Tirkennedy to the west; Knockninny to the south-west; and Coole to the south; Clankelly to the south-east; and Clogher to the north-west.

== History ==
The barony of Magherastephana is first recorded in 1520 in the Annals of the Four Masters, as Machaire Stefanach, and in Annals of Ulster in 1530 as (an) Machaire Steabhanach. The origins of the name however are unknown.

Irish scholar John O'Donovan alleged that it was named after a Steafán (Stephen) who was the son of Odhar, the progenitor of the Maguires, and a figure from the 10th century. The problem however is that the name Stephen didn't arrive into Ireland until the 12th century when the Normans brought it in with them, and in which case came in the form of Estievne, which became Gaelicised as Stiabhna, Sdíomnha, Stiana, Steimhín and Sleimhne. The modern Irish forms of Steafán and Stiofán are much later borrowings from English.

If Machaire Steafánach involved the Norman name Fitzstephan, which is gaelicised as Mac Steafáin, the proper form would be Machaire na Steafánach, however Steafánach appears to have the function of an adjective. The closest parallels to other gaelicised Norman names in baronies would be Bharóideach (Barretts) and Choistealach (Costello).

The MacCaffery (Irish: Mac Gafraidh) sept of the Clan Maguire were centered at Ballymacaffry within this barony. They would become one of the five most powerful families in Fermanagh by 1580.

== List of main settlements ==
- Brookeborough
- Lisnaskea
- Maguiresbridge

== List of civil parishes ==
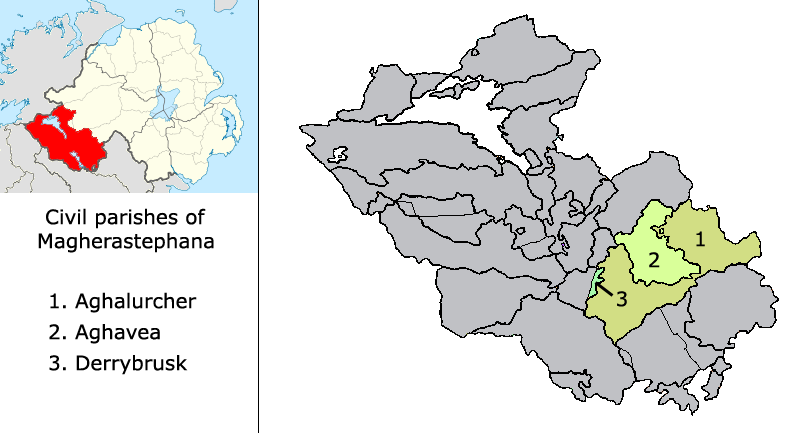
Civil parishes within the barony of Magherastephana, County Fermanagh, Northern Ireland

Below is a list of civil parishes in Magherastephana:

- Aghalurcher (split with barony of Clogher)
- Aghavea
- Derrybrusk (also partly in barony of Tirkennedy)
