= County Fermanagh =

County in Northern Ireland

County Fermanagh Contae Fhear Manach (Irish) Coontie Fermanay (Ulster-Scots)
- County
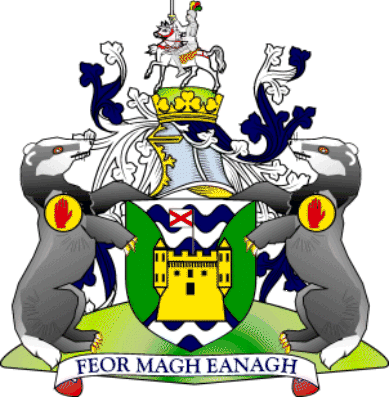
- Coat of arms
- Nickname: The Lakeland County
- Motto: Feor Magh Eanagh (Irish) "the Country of the Lakes"
- Country: United Kingdom
- Constituent country: Northern Ireland
- Province: Ulster
- Established: 1584/85
- County town: Enniskillen

Area
  - Total: 715 sq mi (1,851 km^{2})
  - Land: 653 sq mi (1,691 km^{2})
- Highest elevation (Cuilcagh): 2,182 ft (665 m)

Population (2021)
  - Total: 63,585
  - Rank: 29th
  - Density: 97.39/sq mi (37.60/km^{2})
- Time zone: UTC±0 (GMT)
  - Summer (DST): UTC+1 (BST)
- Postcode area: BT
- Area code: 028
- Contae Fhear Manach is the Irish name; Countie Fermanagh, Coontie Fermanagh and Coontie Fermanay are Ulster Scots spellings (the latter used only by Dungannon & South Tyrone Borough Council).

County Fermanagh (/fərˈmænə/, fər-MAN-ə; from Irish Fir Manach / Fear Manach, meaning 'men of Manach') is one of the six counties of Northern Ireland, one of the nine counties of Ulster and one of the traditional thirty-two counties of Ireland.

The county covers an area of 1,691 km^{2} (653 sq mi) and had a population of 63,585 as of 2021. Enniskillen is the county town and largest in both size and population.

Fermanagh is one of four counties of Northern Ireland to have a majority of its population from a Catholic background, according to the 2011 census.

== Geography ==
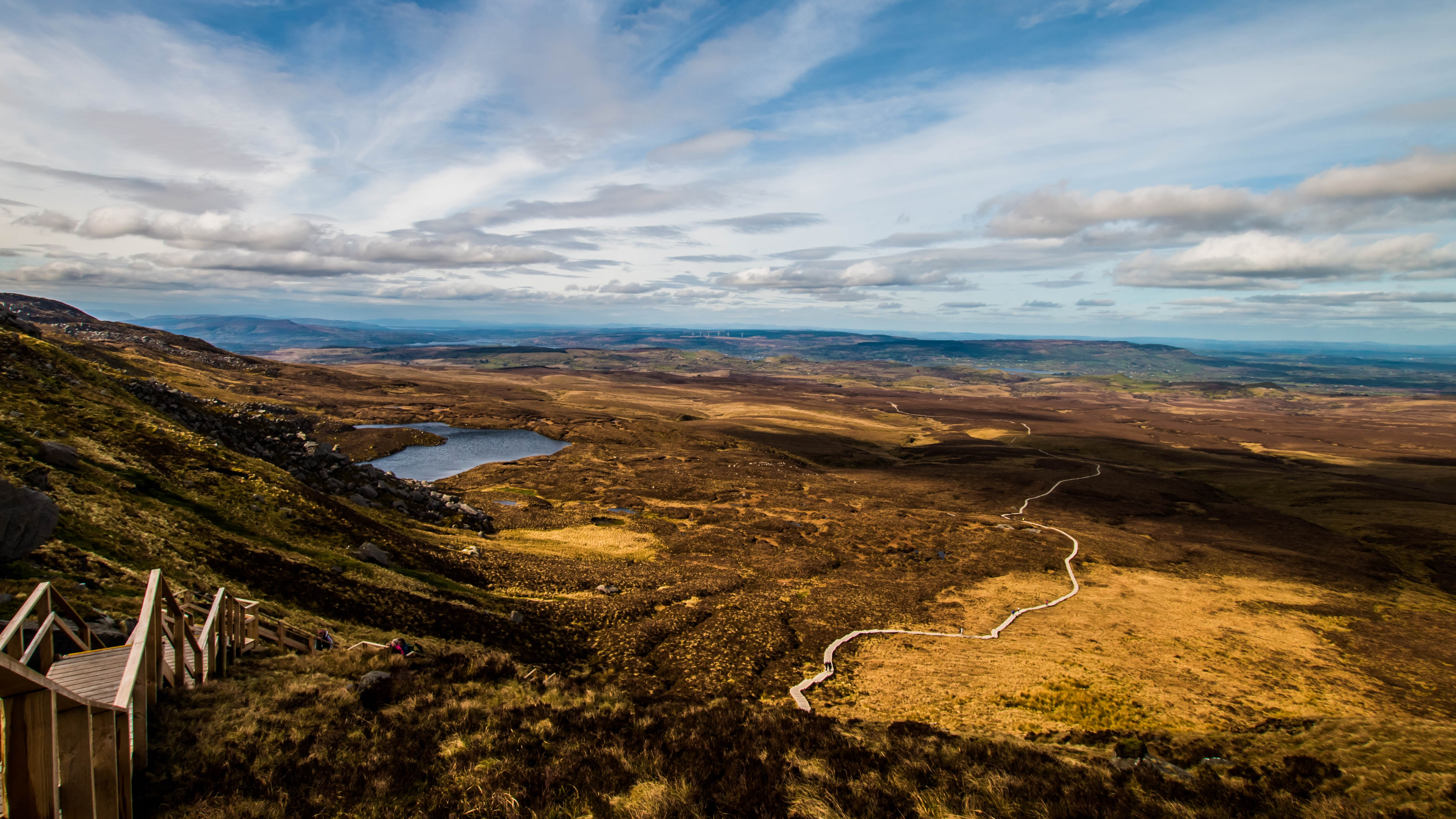
The Cuilcagh range, on the Cavan/Fermanagh border.

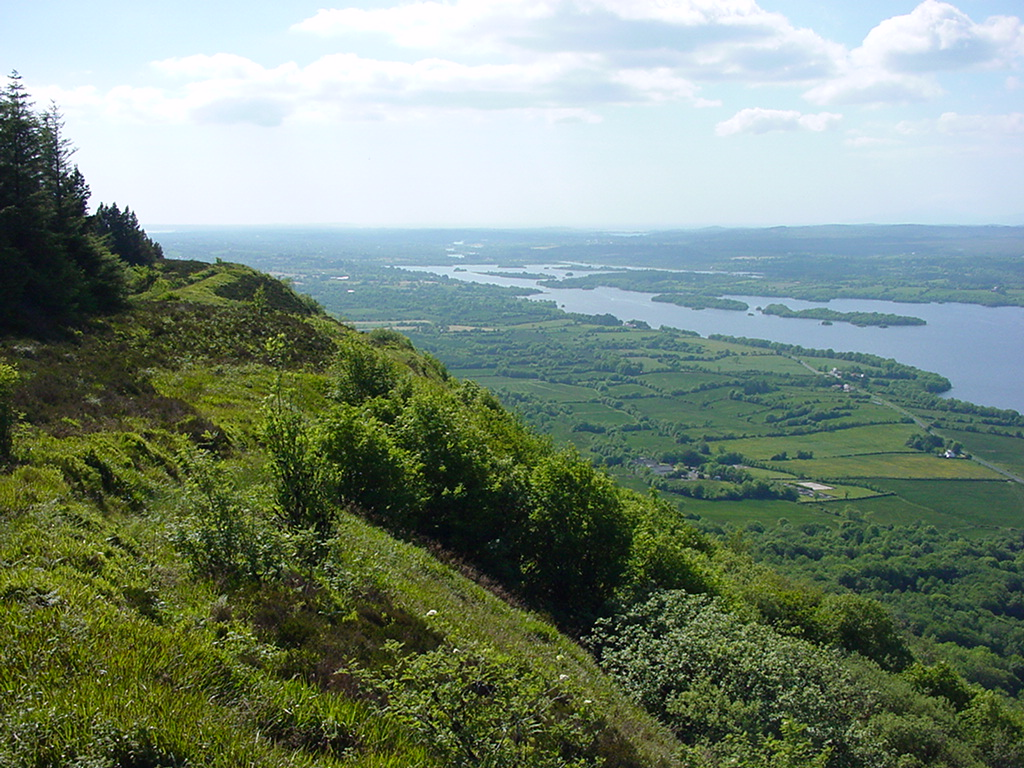
Lower Lough Erne

Fermanagh spans an area of 1,851 km^{2} (715 sq; mi), accounting for 13.2% of the landmass of Northern Ireland. Nearly a third of the county is covered by lakes and waterways, including Upper and Lower Lough Erne and the River Erne. Forests cover 14% of the landmass (42,000 hectares). It is the only county in Northern Ireland that does not border Lough Neagh.

The county has three prominent upland areas:

- the expansive West Fermanagh Scarplands to the southwest of Lough Erne, which rise to about 350m,
- the Sliabh Beagh hills, situated to the east on the Monaghan border, and
- the Cuilcagh mountain range, located along Fermanagh's southern border, which contains Cuilcagh, the county's highest point, at 665m.

The county borders:

- County Tyrone to the north-east,
- County Monaghan to the south-east,
- County Cavan to the south-west,
- County Leitrim to the west, and
- County Donegal to the north-west.

Fermanagh is by far the least populous of Northern Ireland's six counties, with just over one-third the population of Tyrone, the next least populous county.

It is approximately 120 km (75 mi) from Belfast and 160 km (99 mi) from Dublin. The county town, Enniskillen, is the largest settlement in Fermanagh, situated in the middle of the county.

The county enjoys a temperate oceanic climate (Cfb') with cool winters, mild humid summers, and a lack of temperature extremes, according to the Köppen climate classification.

The National Trust for Places of Historic Interest or Natural Beauty manages three sites of historic and natural beauty in the county: Crom Estate, Florence Court, and Castle Coole.

=== Geology ===
The oldest sediments in the county are found north of Lough Erne. These so-called red beds were formed approximately 550 million years ago. Extensive sandstone can be found in the eastern part of the county, laid down during the Devonian, 400 million years ago. Much of the rest of the county's sediments are shale and limestone dating from the Carboniferous, 354 to 298 million years ago. These softer sediments have produced extensive cave systems such as the Shannon Cave, the Marble Arch Caves and the Caves of the Tullybrack and Belmore hills. The carboniferous shale exists in several counties of northwest Ireland, an area known colloquially as the Lough Allen basin. The basin is estimated to contain 9.4 trillion cubic metres of natural gas, equivalent to 1.5 billion barrels of oil.

The county is situated over a sequence of prominent faults, primarily the Killadeas – Seskinore Fault, the Tempo – Sixmilecross Fault, the Belcoo Fault and the Clogher Valley Fault which cross-cuts Lough Erne.

== History ==
The Menapii are the only known Celtic tribe specifically named on Ptolemy's 150 AD map of Ireland, where they located their first colony—Menapia—on the Leinster coast c. 216 BC. They later settled around Lough Erne, becoming known as the Fir Manach, and giving their name to Fermanagh and Monaghan. Mongán mac Fiachnai, a 7th-century King of Ulster, is the protagonist of several legends linking him with Manannán mac Lir. They spread across Ireland, evolving into historic Irish (also Scottish and Manx) clans.

The Annals of Ulster which cover medieval Ireland between AD 431 to AD 1540 were written at Belle Isle on Lough Erne near Lisbellaw.

In the early 9th century, the Erne was considered to be the boundary of Connacht and Ulster, specifically the over-kingdom of Airgíalla. The Fir Manach proper, Tirkennedy and Magherastephana, along with Clankelly were part of the western Airgíalla group-kingdom of Uí Creamthainn with its seat at Clogher, whereas Lurg was associated with the northern Airgíalla branch of Uí Fiachrach centred at Ardstraw.

Fermanagh was a stronghold of the Maguire clan and Donn Carrach Maguire (died 1302) was the first of the chiefs of the Maguire dynasty. However, on the confiscation of lands relating to Hugh Maguire, Fermanagh was divided in a similar manner to the other five escheated counties among Scottish and English undertakers and native Irish. The baronies of Knockninny and Magheraboy were allotted to Scottish undertakers, those of Clankelly, Magherastephana and Lurg to English undertakers and those of Clanawley, Coole, and Tyrkennedy, to servitors and natives. The chief families to benefit under the new settlement were the families of Cole, Blennerhasset, Butler, Hume, and Dunbar.

Fermanagh was made into a county by a statute of Elizabeth I, but it was not until the time of the Plantation of Ulster that it was finally brought under civil government.

The closure of all the lines of Great Northern Railway (Ireland) within County Fermanagh in 1957 left the county as the first non-island county in the UK without a railway service.

== Administration ==
Historical population
Year	Pop.	±%
1653	5,498	—
1659	7,102	+29.2%
1821	130,997	+1744.5%
1831	149,763	+14.3%
1841	156,481	+4.5%
1851	116,047	−25.8%
1861	105,768	−8.9%
1871	92,794	−12.3%
1881	84,879	−8.5%
1891	74,170	−12.6%
1901	65,430	−11.8%
1911	61,836	−5.5%
1926	57,984	−6.2%
1937	54,569	−5.9%
1951	53,044	−2.8%
1961	51,531	−2.9%
1966	49,886	−3.2%
1971	50,255	+0.7%
1981	51,594	+2.7%
1991	54,033	+4.7%
2001	57,527	+6.5%
2011	61,805	+7.4%
2021	63,585	+2.9%

The county was administered by Fermanagh County Council from 1899 until the abolition of county councils in Northern Ireland in 1973. With the creation of Northern Ireland's district councils, Fermanagh District Council became the only one of the 26 that contained all of the county from which it derived its name. After the re-organisation of local government in 2015, Fermanagh was still the only county wholly within one council area, namely Fermanagh and Omagh District Council, albeit that it constituted only a part of that entity.

For the purposes of elections to the UK Parliament, the territory of Fermanagh is part of the Fermanagh and South Tyrone Parliamentary Constituency. This constituency elected Provisional IRA hunger-striker Bobby Sands as a member of parliament in the April 1981 Fermanagh and South Tyrone by-election, shortly before his death.

== Demographics ==
Religious Background in Fermanagh (2021)
Religion	Per cent
Catholic	58.8%
Protestant and Other Christian	35.5%
None	4.6%
Other faiths	1.1%

=== 2011 census ===
On Census Day (27 March 2011), the usually resident population of Fermanagh Local Government District, the borders of the district were very similar to those of the traditional County Fermanagh, was 61,805. Of these:

- 0.93% were from an ethnic minority population and the remaining 99.07% were white (including Irish Traveller)
- 59.16% belong to or were brought up in the Catholic religion and 37.78% belong to or were brought up in a 'Protestant and Other Christian (including Christian related)' religion
- 37.20% indicated that they had a British national identity, 36.08% had an Irish national identity and 29.53% had a Northern Irish national identity

=== 2021 Census ===
On Census Day (2021), the usually resident population of Fermanagh Local Government District, the borders of the district were very similar to those of the traditional County Fermanagh, was 63,585. Of these:

- 58.8% belong to or were brought up in the Catholic religion and 35.5% belong to or were brought up in a 'Protestant and Other Christian (including Christian related)' religion.

=== Community background and religion ===
Religion or religion brought up in (2021 Census)
Religion or religion brought up in	Number	(%)
Catholic	37,399	58.8
Protestant and other Christian	22,559	35.5
None (no religion)	2,947	4.6
Other	680	1.1
Total	63,585	100.0

Religion (2021 Census)
Religion	Number	(%)
Christian	55,892	87.9
Catholic	35,412	55.7
Church of Ireland	13,065	20.5
Methodist	2,552	4.0
Presbyterian	1,989	3.1
Other Christian (including Christian related)	2,874	4.5
Protestant and Other Christian: Total	20,480	32.2
Other	601	0.9
Islam	216	0.3
Hinduism	50	0.08
Other religions	335	0.5
None/not stated	7,092	11.2
No religion	5,885	9.3
Religion not stated	1,207	1.9
Total	63,585	100.0

Religious affiliation of Fermanagh residents according to Historical Censuses
Year	Total population	% Roman Catholics	Number of Roman Catholics	% Presbyterians	Number of Presbyterians	% Church of Ireland and other Episcopalians	Number of Church of Ireland and other Episcopalians	% Methodists	Number of Methodists	% Other denominations	Number of Other denominations
1861	105,788	56.5%	59,751	1.8%	1,909	38.4%	40,608	3.3%	3,455	<0.1%	45
1871	92,768	55.9%	51,876	1.9%	1,813	37.8%	35,072	4.1%	3,794	0.3%	239
1881	84,879	55.8%	47,359	2.0%	1,708	36.4%	30,874	5.7%	4,863	0.1%	75
1891	74,170	55.4%	41,102	1.8%	1,312	36.2%	26,869	6.4%	4,779	0.2%	107
1901	65,430	55.3%	36,198	2.0%	1,282	35.3%	23,099	7.2%	4,744	0.2%	107
1911	61,836	56.2%	34,740	2.0%	1,264	34.2%	21,123	6.5%	4,028	1.1%	681
1926	57,984	56.0%	32,455	2.5%	1,461	33.6%	19,496	6.3%	3,663	1.6%	909
1937	54,569	55.3%	30,196	3.0%	1,616	33.4%	18,252	6.4%	3,486	1.9%	1,019
1951	53,044	55.6%	29,461	3.4%	1,799	32.8%	17,411	6.4%	3,399	1.8%	974
1961	51,531	53.2%	27,422	3.9%	2,021	33.3%	17,141	6.7%	3,465	2.9%	1,482

=== Ethnicity ===
Ethnic group (2021 Census)
Ethnic group	Number	(%)
White: Total	62,583	98.4
White: British/Irish/Northern Irish/English/Scottish/Welsh (with or without non-UK or Irish national identities)	60,244	94.7
White: Other	2,199	3.5
White: Irish Traveller	135	0.2
White: Roma	4	0.006
Other ethnic groups: Total	1,002	1.6
Asian or Asian British	501	0.8
Black or Black British	122	0.2
Mixed	304	0.5
Other: Any other ethnic group	75	0.1
Total	63,585	100.0

=== Country of birth ===
Country of birth, 2021 Census
Country of birth	Number	(%)
United Kingdom and Ireland	60,433	95.0
Northern Ireland	52,063	81.9
England	3,477	5.5
Scotland	420	0.7
Wales	98	0.2
Republic of Ireland	4,375	6.9
Europe	2,139	3.4
European Union	2,047	3.2
Other non-EU countries	92	0.2
Rest of World	1,013	1.6
Middle East and Asia	468	0.7
North America, Central America and Caribbean	243	0.4
Africa	187	0.3
Antarctica, Oceania and Other	85	0.1
South America	30	0.05
Total	63,585	100.0

=== Main languages ===
Main languages of all usual residents over the age of 3 (2021 Census)
Main language	Usual residents aged 3+	(%)
English	59,081	96.4
Polish	649	1.1
Lithuanian	389	0.6
Bulgarian	200	0.3
Irish	138	0.2
Latvian	115	0.2
All other languages	745	1.2
Total (usual residents aged 3+)	61,316	100.0

=== Knowledge of Irish ===
Ability in Irish of all usual residents over the age of 3 (2021 Census)
Ability in Irish	Number	(%)
Speaks, reads, writes and understands Irish	2,703	4.4
Speaks and reads but does not write Irish	509	0.8
Speaks but does not read or write Irish	2,336	3.8
Understands but does not read, write or speak Irish	3,114	5.1
Other combination of skills	929	1.5
Has some knowledge of Irish: Total	9,591	15.6
No ability in Irish	51,725	84.4
Total (usual residents aged 3+)	61,316	100.0

- In County Fermanagh, 1.91% claim to use Irish daily and 0.22% claim that Irish is their main language.

=== Knowledge of Ulster Scots ===
Ability in Ulster Scots of all usual residents over the age of 3 (2021 Census)
Ability in Ulster Scots	Number	(%)
Speaks, reads, writes and understands Ulster Scots	490	0.8
Speaks and reads but does not write Ulster Scots	319	0.5
Speaks but does not read or write Ulster Scots	1,194	1.9
Understands but does not read, write or speak Ulster Scots	2,468	4.0
Other combination of skills	395	0.6
Has some knowledge of Ulster Scots: Total	4,866	7.9
No ability in Ulster Scots	56,450	92.1
Total (usual residents aged 3+)	61,316	100.0

- 0.99% claim to use Ulster Scots daily in County Fermanagh.

=== National identity ===
National identity (2021 Census)
National identity	Number	%
Irish only	24,341	38.3%
British only	16,678	26.2%
Northern Irish only	13,543	21.3%
British and Northern Irish only	2,863	4.5%
Irish and Northern Irish only	1,168	1.8%
British, Irish and Northern Irish only	602	0.9%
British and Irish only	305	0.5%
Other identity	4,086	6.4%
Total	63,585	100.0%
All Irish identities	26,653	41.9%
All British identities	20,920	32.9%
All Northern Irish identities	18,481	29.1%

== Industry and tourism ==
Agriculture and tourism are two of the most important industries in Fermanagh. The main types of farming in the area are beef, dairy, sheep, pigs and some poultry. Most of the agricultural land is used as grassland for grazing and silage or hay rather than for other crops.

The waterways are extensively used by cabin cruisers, other small pleasure craft and anglers. The main town of Fermanagh is Enniskillen (Inis Ceithleann, 'Ceithleann's island'). The island town hosts a range of attractions including the Castle Coole Estate and Enniskillen Castle, which is home to the museum of The Royal Inniskilling Fusiliers and the 5th Royal Inniskilling Dragoon Guards. Fermanagh is also home to The Boatyard Distillery, a distillery producing gin.

Attractions outside Enniskillen include:

- Belleek Pottery
- Castle Archdale
- Crom Estate
- Cuilcagh Boardwalk Trail
- Devenish Island
- Florence Court
- Marble Arch Caves
- Tempo Manor

== Settlements ==
The classification of settlements by NISRA defines six categories following the 2011 census (ignoring Belfast and Derry City which have their own separate categories), namely; Large towns, Medium towns, Small towns, Intermediate settlements, Villages and Small villages or hamlets. The majority of the settlements in County Fermanagh lie within the final category, five within the village category and one each in the intermediate settlements and medium towns categories. No settlements in the county are classified as Large towns or Small towns.

=== Large towns ===
(population of 18,000 or more and under 75,000 at 2021 Census)

- none

=== Medium towns ===
(population of 10,000 or more and under 18,000 at 2021 Census)

- Enniskillen

=== Small towns ===
(population of 5,000 or more and under 10,000 at 2021 Census)

- none

=== Intermediate settlements ===
(population of 2,250 or more and under 4,500 at 2021 Census)

- Irvinestown
- Lisnaskea

=== Villages ===
(population of 1,000 or more and under 2,250 at 2021 Census)

- Ballinamallard
- Kesh
- Lisbellaw
- Maguiresbridge

=== Small villages or hamlets ===
(population of less than 1,000 at 2021 Census)

- Aghadrumsee
- Arney
- Ballycassidy
- Belcoo
- Bellanaleck
- Belleek
- Boho
- Brookeborough
- Carrybridge
- Clabby
- Coa
- Derrygonnelly
- Derrylin
- Donagh
- Ederney
- Florencecourt
- Garrison
- Killadeas
- Killesher
- Kinawley
- Lack
- Letterbreen
- Lisnarick
- Magheraveely
- Monea
- Newtownbutler
- Pettigo (partially)
- Rosslea
- Springfield
- Tamlaght
- Teemore
- Tempo
- Wattlebridge

=== Population of Settlements ===
Settlement	Irish	2001 Population	2011 Population	2021 Population
Arney / Skea	an Arna / Sceach	114	125	134
Ballinamallard	Béal Átha na Mallacht	1,340	1,432	1,364
Ballycassidy / Laragh / Trory	Baile Uí Chaiside / Lathrach / Treabhraigh	315	363	357
Belcoo / Holywell	Béal Cú / Dabhach Phádraig	486	540	439
Bellanaleck	Bealach na Leice	213	532	714
Belleek	Béal Leice	836	904	968
Brookeborough	Achadh Lon	517	452	438
Clabby	Clabaigh	198	268	282
Derrygonnelly	Doire Ó gConaíle	594	678	574
Derrylin	Doire Loinne	423	640	656
Donagh	Domhnach	255	179	164
Ederney	Eadarnaidh	554	587	553
Enniskillen	Inis Ceithleann	13,599	13,790	14,120
Florencecourt / Drumlaghy	Mullach na Seangán / Druim Lathaighe	135	91	102
Garrison	an Garastún	357	351	392
Irvinestown	Na Cairn / Baile an Irbhinigh	1,801	2,264	2,320
Kesh	an Cheis	972	1,036	1,101
Killadeas	Cill Chéile Dé	90	63	82
Killesher / Derrylester	Cill Laisre / Doire an Leastair	N/A	N/A	59
Kinawley	Cill Náile	75	141	142
Lack	an Leac	114	111	111
Letterbreen	Leitir Bhruín	N/A	68	51
Lisbellaw	Lios Béal Átha	1,046	1,102	1,085
Lisnarick	Lios na nDaróg	219	238	203
Lisnaskea	Lios na Scéithe	2,739	2,960	3,006
Magheraveely	Machaire Mhílic	N/A	66	N/A
Maguiresbridge	Droichead Mhig Uidhir	774	1,038	1,029
Monea	Maigh Niadh	114	206	248
Newtownbutler	an Baile Nua	943	987	972
Pettigo (Portion in Co. Fermanagh)	Paiteagó	81	63	76
Roslea	Ros Liath	554	528	482
Springfield	Achadh an Fhuaráin	69	73	69
Tamlaght	Tamhlacht	276	409	341
Teemore	an Tigh Mór	N/A	184	161
Tempo	an tIompú Deiseal	533	489	458

Population statistics were not made available from the 2001, 2011 and 2021 censuses, where noted with an "N/A".

== Subdivisions ==
Baronies

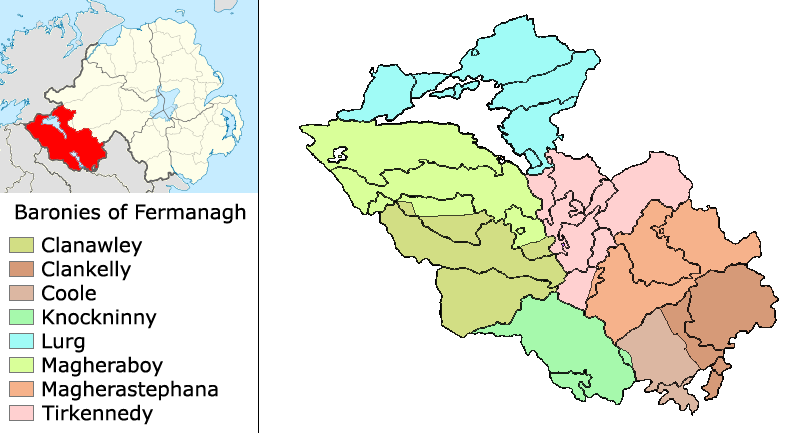
Baronies of County Fermanagh within Northern Ireland with civil parish boundaries

- Clanawley
- Clankelly
- Coole
- Knockninny
- Lurg
- Magheraboy
- Magherastephana
- Tirkennedy

Parishes

Townlands

== Media ==
Newspapers

- The Fermanagh Herald
- The Impartial Reporter

== Education ==
There are 41 primary schools currently in operation in County Fermanagh, 10 secondary schools, one special school and one further education college.

Primary Schools

- Aghadrumsee Primary School
- Ballinamallard Primary School
- Belleek Primary School
- Brookeborough Primary School
- Bunscoil an Traonaigh, Lisnaskea-The only Irish Medium School in the county
- Derrygonnelly Primary School
- Enniskillen Integrated Primary School
- Enniskillen Model Primary School
- Florencecourt Primary School
- Holy Trinity Primary School -Amalgamation of St. Theresa's and St. Michael's PS
- Irvinestown Primary School
- Jones Memorial Primary School
- Kesh Primary School
- Killyhommon Primary School, Boho
- Lack Primary School
- Lisbellaw Primary School
- Maguiresbridge Primary School
- Moat Primary School, Lisnaskea
- St Columban's Primary School, Belcoo
- St Davog's Primary School, Belleek
- St John the Baptist Primary School, Roscor
- St Joseph's Primary School, Donagh
- St Joseph's Primary School, Ederney
- St Macartan's Primary School, Aghadrumsee - Amalgamation of Cornagague PS, Magheraveely and Corranny PS
- St Martin's Primary School, Garrison
- St Mary's Primary School, Brookeborough
- St Mary's Primary School, Killesher
- St Mary's Primary School, Maguiresbridge
- St Mary's Primary School, Arney
- St Mary's Primary School, Newtownbutler
- St Mary's Primary School, Teemore
- St Mary's Primary School, Tempo
- St Naile's Primary School, Kinawley
- St Ninnidh's Primary School, Derrylin
- St Patrick's Primary School, Derrygonnelly
- St Patrick's Primary School, Mullanaskea
- St Paul's Primary School, Irvinestown
- St Ronan's Primary School, Lisnaskea
- St Tierney's Primary School, Roslea
- Tattygar Primary School, Lisbellaw
- Tempo Primary School

Secondary Schools

- Devenish College, Enniskillen - Amalgamation of Ballinamallard Duke of Westminster, Kesh Duke of Westminster and Lisnaskea High School
- Enniskillen Royal Grammar School - Amalgamation of Potora Royal School and Collegiate Grammar School
- Erne Integrated College, Enniskillen
- Mount Lourdes Grammar School, Enniskillen - Girls Catholic Grammar
- Saint Kevin's College, Lisnaskea- Amalgamation of St Eugene's College, Roslea and St. Comhghall's College, Lisnaskea
- St Aidan's High School, Derrylin
- St Fanchea's College, Enniskillen
- St Joseph's College, Enniskillen
- St Mary's College, Irvinestown
- St Michael's College, Enniskillen - Boys Catholic Grammar

Further Education College

- South West College, Enniskillen Campus

Special School

- Willowbridge Special School

Closed Schools

- St Mary's High School, Belleek -Brollagh Closed 2021
- St. Eugene’s College, Roslea - Closed 2017
- St. Eugene’s Primary School, Knocks - Closed 2013
- Lisnaskea High School - Closed 2013
- Corranny Primary School - Closed 2012
- Cornagague Primary School- Closed 2012
- Duke of Westminster High School, Ballinamallard - Closed 2004
- Kesh Duke of Westminster - Closed 2004
- Ashwoods Primary School - Closed 1968
- St Mary's Primary School, Bannagh - Closed 1960/70s

== Sport ==
Fermanagh GAA has never won a Senior Provincial or an All-Ireland title in any Gaelic games, it is only one of two counties to win neither title. There are 22 GAA clubs in the county, this is the second least of all 32 counties (Longford now has the least, with 21 GAA clubs).

Only Ballinamallard United F.C. take part in the Northern Ireland football league system. All other Fermanagh clubs play in the Fermanagh & Western FA league systems. Fermanagh Mallards F.C. played in the Women's Premier League until 2013.

Enniskillen RFC was founded in 1925 and is still going. There is also a rugby league team, the Fermanagh Redskins

Famous football players from Fermanagh include –

- Sandy Fulton
- Jim Cleary
- Roy Carroll
- Harry Chatton
- Barry Owens
- Kyle Lafferty

== Notable people ==
Famous people born, raised in or living in Fermanagh include:

- John Armstrong (1717–1795), born in Fermanagh, Major General in the Continental Army and delegate in the Continental Congress
- Samuel Beckett (1906–1989), author and playwright from Foxrock in Dublin, educated at Portora Royal School
- Darren Breslin, traditional musician
- The 1st Viscount Brookeborough, Prime Minister of Northern Ireland, 1943–1963
- Denis Parsons Burkitt (1911–1993), doctor, discoverer of Burkitt's lymphoma
- Roy Carroll (born 1977), association footballer
- Edward Cooney (1867–1960), evangelist and early leader of the Cooneyite and Go-Preachers
- Brian D'Arcy (born 1945), C.P., Passionist priest and media personality
- Brendan Dolan (born 1973), professional darts player for the PDC
- Adrian Dunbar (born 1958), actor
- Arlene Foster, Baroness Foster of Aghadrumsee (born 1970), politician
- Neil Hannon (born 1970), musician
- Robert Kerr (1882–1963), athlete and Olympic gold medalist
- Kyle Lafferty (born 1987), Northern Ireland International association footballer
- Charles Lawson (born 1959), actor (plays Jim McDonald in Coronation Street)
- Francis Little (1822–1890), born in Fermanagh, Wisconsin State Senator
- Terence MacManus (c. 1823–1861), leader in Young Irelander Rebellion of 1848
- Michael Magner (1840–97), recipient of the Victoria Cross
- Peter McGinnity, Gaelic footballer, Fermanagh's first winner of an All-Star Award
- Martin McGrath, Gaelic footballer, All-Star winner
- Ciarán McMenamin (born 1975), actor
- Gilla Mochua Ó Caiside (12th century), poet
- Aurora Mulligan, director
- Barry Owens, Gaelic footballer, two-time All-Star winner
- Sean Quinn (born 1947), entrepreneur
- Michael Sleavon (1826–1902), recipient of the Victoria Cross
- Joan Trimble (1915–2000), pianist and composer
- Oscar Wilde (1854–1900), author and playwright, educated at Portora Royal School
- Gordon Wilson (1927–1995), peace campaigner and Irish senator

== Surnames ==
The most common surnames in County Fermanagh at the time of the United Kingdom Census of 1901 were:

1. Maguire
2. McManus
3. Johnston
4. Armstrong
5. Gallagher
6. Elliott
7. Murphy
8. Reilly
9. Cassidy
10. Wilson

== Railways ==
The railway lines in County Fermanagh connected Enniskillen railway station with Derry from 1854, Dundalk from 1861, Bundoran from 1868 and Sligo from 1882.

The railway companies that served the county, prior to the establishment by the merger of Londonderry and Enniskillen Railway, Enniskillen and Bundoran Railway the Dundalk and Enniskillen Railway which was later named the Irish North Western Railway, thus forming the Great Northern Railway (Ireland). By 1883 the Great Northern Railway (Ireland) absorbed all the lines except the Sligo, Leitrim and Northern Counties Railway, which remained independent throughout its existence.

In October 1957 the Government of Northern Ireland closed the GNR line, which made it impossible for the SL&NCR continue and forced it also to close.

The nearest railway station to Enniskillen is Sligo station which is served by trains to Dublin Connolly and is operated by Iarnród Éireann. The Dublin-Sligo railway line has a two-hourly service run by Iarnród Éireann. The connecting bus from Sligo via Manorhamilton to Enniskillen is route 66 operated by Bus Éireann.

== See also ==
- Abbeys and priories in Northern Ireland (County Fermanagh)
- Castles in County Fermanagh
- Extreme points of the United Kingdom
- High Sheriff of Fermanagh
- List of parishes of County Fermanagh
- List of places in County Fermanagh
- List of townlands in County Fermanagh
- Lord Lieutenant of Fermanagh
- People from County Fermanagh
