= McCaul =

Origin
- Meaning: "Son of Battle Chief"
- Region of origin: County Tyrone, Ireland.

Other names
- Variant forms: McCawell, McCall

McCaul, also spelt MacCawell is an Irish surname, derived from the Gaelic Mac Cathmhaoil, meaning the "son of Cathmhaol", descendant of being implied. The name Cathmhaoil itself is derived from cath mhaol meaning "battle chief". The Mac Cathmhaoil were the leading family of Cenél Fearadhaigh, of the Uí Néill, and were based around Clogher in modern-day County Tyrone, Northern Ireland. They were one of the seven powerful septs that supported the O'Neills. Mac Cathmhaoil is now rare in Ulster as it has been Anglicised under various different forms such as, Campbell, McCawl, Caulfield, McCall, Alwell, Callwell, McCowell, Cowell, McCuill, Howell, MacHall, and McQuade.

The height of their power was in the 12th century where their territory covered most of modern County Tyrone, and deep into County Fermanagh. By the mid fourteenth century their power in Fermanagh, was broken by the rise of the Maguires. Having controlled the seat of power of the diocese of Clogher, the MacCawells provided many abbots, deans, canons etc. to it and mostly neighbouring dioceses including six bishops and two archbishops. By the end of the sixteenth century there appears to have been a large migration of the sept into the modern counties of Down and Armagh.

== History ==
The MacCathmhaoils took their patronymic name from Cathmhaol in the 12th century, descended from Feradhach (or Fearadhaigh), grandson of Eoghan son of "Niall of the Nine Hostages" a 5th-century Irish King . They were the leading sept of Cenél Fearadhaigh, sometimes called Cenél Fearadhaigh Theas or Cinel-Farry, based in the barony of Clogher, to distinguish them from the offshoots of Cenél Fearadhaigh who remained in Inishowen or thereabouts. After this expansion into mid Ulster with Cenél nEoghain, the MacCathmhaoils were fixed in the Clogher area of County Tyrone, the former capital and inauguration site of Airgíalla. As Cenél Fearadhaigh, it was their function to hold a bastion for Cenél nEoghain against Cenél Conaill on the northwest and the descendants of the Three Collas on the south-west and south.

In the Annals of the Four Masters, under 1185 (16 years after the Norman invasion of Ireland), the second mention is made of a MacCathmhaoil with "Gillchreest MacCathmhaoil, head chieftain of the Cineal Fereadaidh being "the chief of the councils of the north of Ireland", who was slain by Teag O'hEighnigh (O'Heaney) from Tir-Manach (Fermanagh), aided by Muintir Chaonain (O'Keenan). This Gillchreest MacCathmhaoil, was also head chieftain of clan Aongusa (Magennis? McCann?) of eastern Ulster, clan Dubhinreacht (O'Dubhin? Devaney), clan Fogarty O'Ceannfhoda (Tirkennedy in Fermanagh), and clan Colla of Fermanagh." The townland name Druim Mhic Cathmhaiol (Cathmhaoil's Ridge) on the border of Armagh and Louth might attest to a regional leadership role (in the "Councils of the North") organizing the defenses of Ulster against the Normans. The family name, in a much truncated form, is also preserved in the townland name Clonmakate in north Armagh adjacent to Maghery, (near Lough Neagh and the Blackwater); the original form was Cluain Mhic Cathmhaoil 'Mac Cathmhaoil's meadow'. The inauguration of the Cineal Fereadaidh Chiefs probably happened at ancient royal site of Clochar Mac nDaimhín.

They receive mention in Ceart Ui Néill being one of the three, along with MacMurchaidh and O'Devlin, classed as "fircheithearna" (select fighting men or foot soldiers i.e. "true kerns") of Ui Néill. A Kern (soldier) was a Gaelic soldier, specifically a light infantryman of Gaelic Ireland during the Middle Ages. From Ceart Ui Néill 14. "it is their duty to take and to guard hostages; and they are bound by their office to keep watch for the first three nights in camp and on a hosting..." and elsewhere "In his time, it was usual to for victorious conquerors to take captives, usually of exalted rank, as hostages for the good (i.e. subservient) subsequent behaviour of the vanquished".

Later they became an important church family. They were also Brehons (judges of Irish law) in Cenél nEoghain (Tyrone), are famous in Irish history for their learning and the many dignitaries they supplied to the church. In Cenél nEoghain about this time, 1300, the Mac Cathmhaoils were the hereditary advisers of the king, being one of the seven main septs of the Cenél nEoghain Ui Neill. The family's importance is obvious from a glance at the events listed in connection with them under MacCathmhail in the index to the Annals of Ulster.

== Family tree ==
This is one version of a list of male descendants from Niall of the Nine Hostages to Raghnall MacCathmhaoil who is claimed as being the first to use the Mac Cathmhaoil surname, seven generations removed from the ancestor whose name he chose to bear:

- Niall of the Nine Hostages; Eógain (son of Niall); Muiredach mac Eógain; Fearach (or Feradach), a brother of Muircheartach, brother of Muirchertach mac Muiredaig (Mac Ercae) and Fergus Mor; Fiachra; Fichna; Suibne Menn (or Suibne mac Fiachnai); Edalach; Donchar; CuGabhana; Conan; Donachar; Cathmhaoil; Breasal; Murtogh; Fogartach; Maoilcolum; Suibhneach; Colla; Raghnall MacCathmhaoil; Cu Uladh; and Giollachrist (died 1185).

== The annals ==
Below are some entries from the annals, the Annals of Ulster and The Annals of the Four Masters regarding the MacCathmhaoil (anglicized as MacCawell) the leading sept of Cenél Fearadhaigh. Note: Alternative spelling found are listed after name.

- 967, Cionaedh Ua Cathmhaoil, airchinnech Dhoire Chalgaigh, d'ecc in aen-mi. Meaning Cionaedh descendant of Cathmhaoil, erenagh of Dhoire Chalgaigh (the early name of the ecclesiastical center at Derry) died this year. Note: Cionaedh means born of fire, and was also the name of the first King of the Scots and Picts Kenneth MacAlpin.
- 1180, the son of Niall Ua Coemain (O' Keenan) was killed by Donnchadh Mac Cathmail and Donnchadh himself was killed therein. Note: The Hui Caeman (Muinter-Caemhain) ruled Magh Leamhna (Plain of Elm river), the area around Clogher, until about 1180 when they were ousted from the lordship of that region by the MacCathmhaoil.
- 1185, Gillchreest MacCathmhaoil, royal chief of the Cineal Fereadaidh, clan Aongus (Mac Cana), clan Dubhinreacht (Mac Ualgharg or McGoldrick Lords of Hy Dubhinreacht in Clogher), clan Fogarty O'Ceannfhoda (Ó Daimhín Lords of Tirkennedy in Fermanagh), and clan Colla (of Tir-Manach), and head of counsel of the North of Érinn, was slain on the 2nd of Nones (6th) of May by O'hEighnigh (O'Heaney) chiefs in Fermanagh (and Arch Kings of Airgíalla) before the Maguire ascendence in 1202, aided by Muinter-Caemhain (O'Keenan); and they carried off his head, which was obtained from them at the end of a month afterwards. Note: Fogarty O'Ceannfhoda was a 5th-century Airgailla chieftain Fergus Cennfhota 'long-head' of Ui Chrimhthain who had descendants known as Ui Chennfhota and the kingdom of Tir Cennfhota, later anglicized to Tirkennedy.
- 1216, Murchadh Mac Cathmail, royal chief of Cenel- Feradhaigh, died through miracle of St. Colum-cille.
- 1238, Flaithbertach Mac Cathmail, arch-chief of Cenel-Feradhaigh, crown of championship and generosity of the Gaidhil (Irish Gael) and arch-chief, moreover, of Clann-Conghaile (Connelly) and Ui-Cennfhoda (Tirkennedy) in Tir-Manach (Fermanagh), was killed by Donnchadh Mac Cathmail, his own kinsman, in treachery.
- 1252, Conchobur Mac Cathmhail, royal Chief of Cenel Feradhaigh and of many territories besides, tower of hospitality and valour of the North of Ireland, peace-maker of Tirconnell, Tír Eoghain (Tyrone), and Airgíalla, was killed by the routs of the people of Brian O'Neill, while defending his protegees against them, he himself being under the safeguard of O'Gormly and O'Kane. For older translation found in British Museum see reference.
- Mac Cathmhaoil chiefs of Kinel-Farry (Cineal Fereadaidh), slain: Murrough 1215, Flaherty 1238, Donough 1251 (slain by the people of Airgíalla), Conor 1252, Donslevy 1262 (slain by Yellow Hugh Buidha O'Neill), Gillapatrick 1370.
- 1261, A great victory was gained by O'Donnell (Donnell Óg) over Niall Culanagh O'Neill in a battle, in which many of the chiefs of Kinel-Owen, under the conduct of Mac Cawell, Chief of Kinel-Farry, and many other chiefs not mentioned here, were killed or taken prisoners. AFM
- 1262 DonnSléibhe (Donslevy) Mac Cathmhaoil was slain by Yellow Hugh Buidha O'Neill.
- Mac Cathmhaoils slain: Cu-Uladh 1346, Cu-Uladh, son of Gillapatrick 1370, Donough 1346, Donough son of Edmund (died of wounds) 1518.
- 1355, a Cattle Raid example and a battle between O'Donnell and O'Neill (with Mac Cathmail) from 1366
- Brian Mac Cathmhaoil (Bernard MacCamoeil), Bishop of Clogher (1356–1358). He died of the plague in 1358.
- 1362, Ruaidhri, son of Domnall Ua Neill, was killed by Maelechlainn (Mac Cathmaoil), with one shot of (a bow) an arrow. Note: An earlier Domnall Ua Neill was grandson of the 10th century O'Neill Clan founder Niall Glúndub. The name Maelechlainn means "Devotee of St Sechnall" who is thought to be a 5th-century Italian bishop that preceded St Patrick.
- 1365, when Malachy of the Mac Cathmhaoil, the ruling house of Clogher, Tyrone, slew an O'Neill of Tír Eoghain, Malachy was known as 'Maelechainn Mac in Ghirr meic Mac Cathmhaoil'. Translated his name is 'Malachy the son of the Short-Fellow Mac Cathmhaoil'. This feat of slaying an O'Neill warranted a change of name so he became Malachy mac in ghirr or simply Malachy MacGirr. Later this family survived the Ulster Plantation, receiving a number of grants of lands at the time. They are to be found later in the 1660s as taxpayers in the Clogher Valley and elsewhere in Tyrone. Today the family is generally found as McGirr, McGerr, McKerr and in the English version as Short.
- Cu-Uladh Mac an Ghirr Mac Cawell (died 1368), chief of his own tribe and a son of his, who was a learned and illustrious professor of Sciences, died in England.
- 1370, Gillapatrick Mac Cawell, Chief of Kinel-Farry; Cu-uladh, his son, and his wife, the daughter of Manus Mac Mahon, were treacherously slain by the sons of Hugh Mac Cawell. Murrough, his Gillapatrick's brother then became Chieftain of Kinel-Farry.
- 1376, Richard Mac Cathmail (Mac Cawell) was slain by Philip Mag Uidhir (Philip Maguire), the king of Fir-Manach and Domnall Ua Neill (Donnell O Neill).
- 1403, Cú Uladh mac Giolla Patraicc Meic Cathmaoil (Cu Uladh Mac GillaPatrick McCawell) was treacherously slain at an assembly by his own people.
- Donough Mac Cawell, Chief of the two Kinel-Farrys, was slain by Maguire in 1404.
- 1427, Siobhan (Joan), daughter of the bishop Mac Cathmhail, wife of Maurice Mag Uidhir (Maguire), that is, of the great Archdeacon, died on the 13th of the Kalends of February 20 Jan.; one, that maintained a hospital or hospice at Claen inis (now Cleenish) and at Ros-oirther (or Rossorry), in Fermanagh for six and fifty years reputably, humanely and charitably. Note: Claen inis or Cleenish (sloping Island on Lough Erne) was a monastic site founded by St Sinnell in the 6th century, an early instructor of Columbanus, who was said to be the most learned man in Ireland or Britain. Ros-oirther or Rossorry, was a monastery founded in 480 by St. Fanchea and a church in 1048 in Magheraboy, Fermanagh.
- Art Mac Cathmhaoil (Arthur MacCamoeil), Bishop of Clogher (1390–1432) a pious man, who had kept a house of public hospitality for the poor and indigent, died, after penance in 1432.
- 1434, O'Donnell and his son Turlough heir to the lordship of Tirconnell and Mac Cawell went in search of plunder and booty in another direction and their evil fortune brought them into collision with a large body of English cavalry who surrounded them. They contended with them for a long time until Turlough O'Donnell, Mac Cawell, Hugh Mac an Easpuig Mac Cawell and many others were slain and this was on the day after Michaelmas After the loss of his people O'Donnell was taken prisoner and delivered up to the son of John Stanley the King's Deputy, who had shortly before arrived in Ireland, and who sent him to be imprisoned in Dublin.
- 1444, Duvcovla daughter of Thomas Maguire, Lord of Fermanagh and wife Owen Mac Cathmhaoil a humane charitable and truly hospitable woman died. The old Irish name Dubh-choblaith pronounced Duvcovla means dark victory.
- 1461, Mac Cawell i.e. Brian Lord of Kinel Farry died and Owen Mac Cawell was made lord.
- 1480, O'Donnell went upon an excursion into Tyrone accompanied by the sons of Art O'Neill and the sons of Felim O'Neill, and committed great depredations on Mac Cawell in Kinel Farry and slew Brian, the son of Turlough Roe, son of Henry O'Neill and the son of Mac Cawell, i.e. James. O'Neill and his sons happened to be in their neighbourhood at that time, and the sons of O'Neill and Mac Cawell pursued the preys, and slew the son of Art O'Neill a distinguished captain, who was along with O'Donnell. O'Donnell however carried off the preys and returned in triumph to his residence with numerous spoils.
- 1481, the son of GillaPatrick Mac Cawell with many others not enumerated were killed when a great war arose between the O'Neill.
- 1492, Donnell, son of Henry, son of Owen O'Neill, and Gilla-Patrick MacCawell (MacCathmhaoil), were taken prisoners; and Edmond MacCawell was slain by the sons of Redmond McMahon of Airgíalla, i.e. Glasny and Brian. Many others besides these were slain and taken prisoners on that occasion. Donnell, however, made his escape from the castle of Muineachan (Monaghan) a week after his capture.
- 1493, A brawl between the Cenel-Feradhaigh themselves in Clochar (of Ui-Daimin) and Aedh, son of Mac Cathmail, namely, son of Edmond, son of Brian Mac Cathmail, was slain there and Brian, son of Toirdelbach, son of Aengus, son of the Dwarf, was slain there also, namely, the Sunday before May Day (or Bealtaine). Note: The Irish word for dwarf Abhartach is also the name of an early Irish death defying character.
- 1498, GillaPatrick Mac Cawell, Henry O'Neill, Felim McMahon and a great number of the other chiefs of the province were slain in a conflict between the O'Neill.
- William (Uilliam) Oge Mac Cathmhaoil, Son of Art, Dean of Clogher died 1508. Note: he was brother of Eoghan Bishop of Clogher.
- 1508 Great depredations were committed by Art, the son of Con O'Neill, upon the Kinel-Farry. Owen, the son of O'Neill, and the sons of Mac Cawell, overtook him; and Aengus MacSorley 'Bacagh' (the Irish nickname bacach, meaning lame), was slain on the side of Art; but Art himself made his escape from them, and carried off the prey. Note: Art is lightly Art Oge O'Neill the half brother of Conn Bacach O'Neill, 1st Earl of Tyrone and son of Conn Mor who would become head of the O'Neills from 1513 to 1519.
- 1515 Eoghan Mac Cathmhaoil (Eugene Mac Camoeil, Owen), Bishop of the Diocese of Clogher (1505–1515). Owen, the son of Art, son of John, son of Art Mac Cawell, Bishop of Clogher, died. He was buried in St Macartan's Cathedral.
- 1518, in a raid on the territory of Brian O'Neill, Brian met them at Donaghanie (Domhnach-an-eich meaning Church/Sunday of the Horse, near Omagh), and defeated them. Hugh, the son of Donnell O'Neill was taken prisoner and Donough Mac Cawell, the son of Edmond was wounded and many of the Kinel Farry were slain. Mac Cawell died of his wounds afterwards. Note: According to a local legend, the horse belonged to St Patrick and it achieved fame by kicking and killing an amphibious creature which emerged from Lough Patrick! It may also be an older sacred site! Donaghanie could be derived from Dun Eachaidh for 'fort of the horseman' perhaps referring to St Eachaidh who was a fifth century Clones saint, an hours horse ride away. Or did the horse belong to Donn "god of the dead" portrayed as a phantom horseman riding a white horse? Donn is considered an aspect of The Dagda "the great God" also known as "the horseman" and is the origin of the Irish "Loch nEachach" for Loch Neagh.
- 1519, in another raid on the territory of Brian O'Neill at Sliabh Troim (mountain of elder or elderberry) by Domnall O'Neill with the McCathmaoils, Cu-Uladh and Thomas sons of Edmund McCathmaoils and Edmund and Brian two sons of Gilla-Padraic McCathmail were slain. The defeat having taken place at Clogherny, Omagh. Note: Elder or Trom was one of the sacred flowering trees carried in procession at Beltane and a townland called Beltany lies just below it. Sliabh Troim and Clogherny have boggy ground, which may have contributed to their deaths.

== Reformation and dissolution ==
The religious and political turmoil of late medieval, Early Modern Ireland, reformation (1517–1750), Counter-Reformation (1545–1648) is reflected in some of these figures. For the church, it became a "battleground for profit and cultural hegemony" where after the Plantation of Ulster a new Protestant ruling class took ownership and later instituted the Penal Laws. Sources found in texts other than the Annals of the Four Masters. (see Dissolution of Monasteries in Ireland) and Clogher & St. Marcartan's Cathedral, history 500–1970)

- Neal McCamal, Rector of Termonayncomagn died 1367 conveyed to the Primate Milo Sweetman at his manor of Termonfeckin' (near Drogheda inside the Pale). Note: A Termon (in Irish Tearmann), means place of sanctuary, were lands associated with the Church. As territory connected to a church or monastery, it enjoyed certain immunities, privileges and protection as sanctuary lands (though not all church land was termon land). The tenants of termon land were called termoners which is thus a generic name for coarbs and erenaghs.
- Domhnall Mac Cathmhaoil, Bishop of Derry (1415–1419), died 1419, previously Archdeacon of Glendalough and clerk of the diocese of Dublin where he was noted for his skill in Canon law. His name was also written as Donald Mackatmail.
- John McKathmayl (Mackathmeyl, McCamul or McCawell). 1441: Rector of Argull (Errigle Keerogue in Clogher, Tyrone), Prebendary of Termon (church lands) and one of the beneficed clergy of Tullaghogue, Tyrone. 1441, 19 May: A definitive sentence, "in causa beneficiale," ..."A complaint for non-residence at Argull, preferred against John McKathmayl." 1445, 21 Nov.: Excommunication, inter alia (among other things), against John McKathmayl for not paying the Archdeacon his proxies; Note: proxies were certain sums of money which parish priests pay yearly to the bishop or archdeacon. "There was a suspicion that the Gaelic chiefs wished to make the Rectory hereditary in some of their own families; as the coarb-ships and erenaghies had been and were." In 1424 he "received papal dispensation, as the son of a bishop (Arthur McCathmhaoil) and an unmarried woman related in certain degrees of affinity, to be promoted to all, even holy orders... says he is of a race of dukes..."
- Eoghan McCawell, Dean of Armagh (1505–1549) "Armagh's cathedral was in a poor state at the start of the sixteenth century and suffered from a devastating fire in 1511. Under Dean Eoghan McCawell (1505–1549) the edifice was renovated, and soon after his death the cathedral was described by Lord Chancellor Cusack as 'one of the fairest and best churches in Ireland'. The archbishop had to work with the dean and chapter in managing the archiepiscopal estates. All leases of the see lands and the tithes attached to the archbishop's mensa had to be endorsed with the seal of the dean and chapter. The seal was kept under three locks, the keys to which were held by the dean, chancellor and precentor of Armagh... The primary responsibility of the dean and chapter of Armagh was to ensure that the fabric of the cathedral was well-maintained, and that the liturgy was celebrated in a manner appropriate for the mother-church of the archdiocese." Note: mensa is that portion of the property of a church which is appropriated to defraying the expenses either of the prelate or of the community which serves the church.
- James MacCawell, (McCaghwell), is listed as the first Church of England Anglican Archbishop of Cashel 1567–1570. Although now called Anglican, the church at the time considered itself Catholic and so technically James was still a Catholic Bishop and Ireland had dealt with competing influences before under Norman and Gaelic lordships and an early schism with Rome over the date of Easter. James was appointed in October 1567 by Elizabeth I, however, a few months before Maurice MacGibbon was appointed Archbishop by Pope Pius V in June, which lead to a conflict between the two Bishops as Second English Schism was developing: "McCaghwell who had been before disappointed of the Down bishopric (appointed by Elizabeth in 1564, but never consecrated), through terror of Shane O'Neill was wounded, with a Skeine (an Irish knife or dagger), by Archbishop MacGibbon". Furthermore, in 1568 Archbishop MacGibbon was said to have taken rival Archbishop McCaghwell "out of his own house and carried him to Spain." Another source says "Soon after his appointment to Cashel, a worse fate was in store for him: for when he ventured beyond the Pale to claim his flock in the name of her Majesty, he was assailed and arrested by the people, and sent off a prisoner to Spain in the safe keeping of the kerne of Fitzmaurice. " Note: In 1570 Pope Pius V excommunicated Queen Elizabeth I and later in 1584 she would have Archbishop MacGibbons successor Dermot O'Hurley tortured and executed for treason (for not converting to Protestantism). Failure for James to accept Elizabeth's supremacy over the church or to accept her appointments could have led to a similar fate.
- Patrick MacCaul, Bishop of Dromore (in present-day County Down), appointed 23 (or 26) January 1576; died bef. February 1589.
- Miler Cawell, Bishop of Killala (in present-day County Mayo), appointed vicar apostolic by papal brief on 15 May 1591 (N.S.). Note: Miler is an anglization of the Gaelic name Maol Mhuire meaning Devotee of Mary also written as Miles and Milo.
- Owen MacCawell, Archdeacon of St. Columba Derry, the Union of Donebooe (DunDoe) 1612–1622. Member of Jury of "The Inquisition to distinguish between crown and church lands" taken at Limavady, (then in County Coleraine, now in County Londonderry) on 30 August 1609.
- Aodh MacCathmhaoil (1571–1626), Irish Franciscan theologian and Archbishop of Armagh (Aodh means fire) trained at one of the bardic poetry schools still operating in Ulster and was made tutor to Hugh O'Neill, The O'Neill's sons; went to Spain on defeat of the Gaelic earls, entered the Franciscan Order at Salamanca and later became Catholic Archbishop of Armagh and Primate of Ireland.

== Plantation and dispossession ==
The Plantation of Ulster and penal laws (1607-1920s) period is reflected in these figures, where it was said, "With only two, or perhaps three exceptions, every native landlord, and every native tenant within the bounds of the six counties was dispossessed and displaced;..." Later the Penal Laws were intended to degrade the Irish so severely that they would never again be in a position to seriously threaten Colonial rule. From sources other than (and after) the Annals of the Four Masters, with names spelled as they were found.

- Hugh McCawell, Captain: commander of 600 men with Rory and Gillispick McReverin (McGiverin) in the Army of Hugh O'Neill during Nine Years' War (1594–1603). Note: McReverin is most likely a misspelling of McGiverin another leading family in Cenel Ferry.
- 1607 Flight of the Earls, Fearghas MacCathmhaoil (Scholar), listed as being one of about 100 who left with Hugh Ó Néill. From the book Imeacht Na nIarlaí The Flight of the Earls 1607–2007 by Cardinal Tomás Ó Fiaich
- 1610 Plantation of Ulster, Land Grants: Grant to Hugh McCawell, jjent., Tullinecrosse, one balliboe, 60 acres. Rent, 13*. 57. (Tulnacross, Dungannon Upper, Tyrone) Note: Tulaigh na croise means "Hill of the cross".
- 1611 Grant to Owen McCowell (McCawell), Bovidie (Boith Mhéabha meaning Maeve's hut/monastic cell) in the barony of Coleraine. Bovevagh now listed in Keenaght (barony); Owen was one of 13 native Irish given freehold title of some of the confiscated land of Donnell Ballagh O'Cahan who was then in the tower of London.
- 1609–1614 Pardons: Pardon was granted among others to Edmond Duffe Mc Cawell (Black Edmond), James Rowe Mc Cawell (Red James), Edmond Brier Mc Cawell (Fair-haired Edmond). In 1610 to Patrick Oge Mc Cawell (young Patrick). In 1612 to Tirlagh Grome Mac Cawell (Blue/Green Tirlagh), yeoman/kern (yellow Tirlagh), Brien Glasse McOwen McCawell (Green Brien, son of Owen Mc Cawell). In 1613 to Brien Daire Mc Cawell, Donnell Carragh Mc Cawell, yeomen (kern) of Tyrone county. In 1614 pardon among others to Tirlagh Mc Manus Boy Mc Cawell (Turlough, son of Yellow/Bui Manus Mc Cawell), of Killetragh, Tyrone county. From the Pardon lists, English Patent Rolls, James I. Note: McCawells named Turlough where possibly named after The O'Neill Mor Turlough Luineach O'Neill (1532–1595).
- 1631 Tyrone Tenant Lists: Patricke McCawell houldeth Aghnegarry (in Barony of Omagh), being 1 balliboe. Listed in Inquisition held at Dungannon, 1 May 1631. Hugh McCawell, 60 acres to Hugh McCawell, gent. in County of Tyrone: Precinct of Donganon Note: A balliboe, meaning cow-land was a Gaelic division of land, the common English translation for a variety of small local land units that varied in name and meaning throughout Ireland. Roughly synonymous with 'Townland'.
- 1631 The Inquisitions on Attainder (Lands Seized By The King 1631): The said Richard Cooper (1500 acres graunted to him by Ires patents) contrary to the intent and effect of the said Ires, hath sett severall balliboes within the said proportion unto the meer Irish viz; "Torlogh Groome McCawell held the balliboe called Roveagh(Raveagh) and Graghrafynn. Bryen McCawell did hould the towne and balliboe of land called Lysnely (Lisanely Irish Lios an Ailigh 'ringfort of the stony place'), and Bryen O'Neel and Gilgroome O'Connogher held the balliboes called Lysraneese(Raneese), Derrywarde(Derrybard from Doire Barda'oakwood of the guard' or Ir. Doire Baird 'oakwood of the poet'), and Garvallagh. All the said severall balliboes and peells of lands become forfeitt. Conogher Mc'Ghir being a meer Irishman doth plough, pasture, and graise, upon the balliboe of land called Ballyorran (Baile Uaráin' meaning townland of the spring or fountain') within the proportion of Bally [----] barony of Clogher, and therefore the rents and profits of said balliboe are become forfeited to the King" Charles I of England, for being rented to meer Irish.
- 1639 Tyrone Tenant Lists: Inquisition held at Koragh, (Sixmilecross), in 1614 Teige m'Caell (born at Killanele bar Dung.) in Derrybroghes, 1616 (for 1? year) Pattric' m'Cawell (born in town of Wexford) in Branar, 1614 for 1 year Tirlagh Oge m'Cawell (born at Clane in said co.) in Doogerry, Neale Garave m'Cowell (born at Ballentacken) in Tiremany are listed as tenants(among others) of Earl and Countess of Castlehaven.
- 1641 Rebellion/War: Torlogh Grome McCawell and his sons Donnell & Bryen McCawell, Clogher. Planter John Kairnes said that he had been robbed and had stolen from by the Shane Oge O'Neell, Bryen McShane Oge O'Neell, Torlogh Grome McCawell and Shane McCawell of Fenaghdrome, (Fernaghandrum, Clogher, Tyrone) among others. Examination of Henry McCawell – 1653/6/9 (regarding 1641) " ...his brother Patrick McCawell agreed (as this examinant was informed) with Capten Morris and his brother Thomas Morris to carry them by water along Logh Neagh to some place... but by reason of a Storme that was then on the Logh, were forced to retorne with this examinant and his brother Patrick to Mountjoy Castle...where they both remayned prisoners for one night and then set them both at liberty and being asked if he sawe or heard of any of Capten Morrisse his company murdered..." Examination of John Morris "...Aforesaid Patrick Mccawell with us; but he most Earnestly Crying to Mr Hastings for Gods sake to put him Ashoare, least (said he) that Thorlacgh G Quin, who then was Governor of Mountioy Castle, should kill his father,..." Note: The 1641 Depositions are witness testimonies mainly by Protestants, but also by some Catholics, from all social backgrounds, concerning their experiences of the 1641 Irish rebellion. The testimonies document the loss of goods, military activity, and the alleged crimes committed by the Irish insurgents.
- Yoemen/Kern during 1641 Rebellion: Agholy McCawell, Fergus McCawell of Down and Murtagh McCowell, of Ballinlogh, Down. Note: The name Agholy comes from the Irish Eachmhílidh 'horse-soldier', and has strong County Down associations.
- 1642 Father Henry Caghwell, Professor of Philosophy, Studied Humanities at Louvain and Philosophy at Douai. Confined to his bed due to sickness, he was dragged from his house in Dublin by soldiers, scourged and cudgeled in the public square and left dying. He was then thrown in prison and later shipped in a dying condition to France with 20 other priests, where he made an unexpected recovery with "great care" from the Rector of the Jesuit College in Rochelle. He later returned to Ireland where he died a few days later attending the sick. It was actions like these that drove many, such as Irish Franciscan philosopher and theologian John Punch towards revolutionary thought and a reassessment of Scotist philosophy arguing that "the Stuarts had lost the right to rule Ireland for natural reasons, not supernatural ones; because the Stuarts were tyrants, not because they were Protestants."
- 1648 Naoisie McCamell, Captain in the Ulster Army, lead an assault on Carradrumruiske (Carrick-on-Shannon), a main fording point of the Shannon, during the Irish Confederate Wars. Colonel Rory Maguire, former MP of Fermanagh lead 5 or 6 regiments of soldiers, and more reinforcements (regiments of Ulick Burke) from Teige O'Ruarike at Jamestown, County Leitrim, lay siege to the fort and ordered a sconce ditch to be filled with "1500 or 2000 bundles of faggot" or sticks for the assault. He gave Captain Noisie his own "armour of proof" but unfortunately was found shot dead (likely by a matchlock musket) after the fort was taken, much to the grief of his men, "All their victory and triumph was turned to moane and lamentations..." Note: Rory Maguire was brother of Connor Maguire, 2nd Baron of Enniskillen. Ulick Burke would have his land confiscated under Cromwell with the 1652 Act of Settlement but gain it back in the 1662 Act of Settlement.
- 1659 Petty's Survey: 12 McCawell households are listed (out of 255 Irish households) in the Barony of Oneilland in north Armagh. Note: The Pender/Petty Survey along with the Down Survey of 1655–56 was "clearly part of the preparatory work for the mass confiscations that took place under the Cromwellian Commonwealth Dictatorship" and for tax levying purposes.
- 1663 Armagh Hearth Tax Rolls: Torlogh McCawell (1 Fire hearth), Collowe McCawell of Ballyreagh (1 Fire hearth). Cormock McCawell & Patrick Modder McCawell of Corcloghan (1 Fire hearth). Donnell McCawell of Tolly (1 Fire hearth). 2 shillings where due on each heart. Phellem (Féilim) McCawell, Kiltibritt Note: Collowe is the 17th century version of heroic name Cú Uladh 'hound of Ulster' and Modder/Madra is Irish for dog.
- 1666 Tyrone Hearth Tax Rolls: Donachy McCawell, Patrick Cawell Shanlus (Shanliss, Clonoe Parish, Barony of Dungannon), Ferragh McCawell Claoge (Cloghog, Clonoe Parish, Barony of Dungannon on Banks of Lough Neagh, now Dungannon Middle )
- 1666, Charles (alias Cahel) McCawell, declared a rebel on 25 June 1666. After supporting the Restoration of the Stuart monarchy of Charles II (1660–1685) in 1660 there was an expectation by Catholic Irish that they would have some of their own land restored. After the disappointment of the 1662 and 1665 Acts of Settlement many turned to open revolt and looked to other means of survival. Note: This may be the same Charles who in 1701 couldn't afford the sublease under John O'Hanlon a tenant of Lucas Pointz, if so his life may have been similar to other tóraidhe or rapparee "outlaw" Irish such as Redmond O'Hanlon who resisted colonial rule.
- 1668 Rebellion: Carragh McCawell late of the parish of Donagh Cavagh (Donacavey, Clogher, Tyrone), and others declared "Rebels and traitors" in June 1668, Proclamation of the Lord Deputy and Council for being in arms against the Kings authority in Tyrone, Monaghan, Antrim and Down. Pursued by the Kings good subjects they escaped in the woods and mountains. The reward set on the head of each rebel is £10. Note: £10 was about the yearly wage of a day Labourer, so perhaps about £20,000 in today's money. Proclamation of the Lord Lieutenant and Council (23 April 1669), states that "Carragh McCawell is since killed" and regarding other rebels "all who comfort, relieve or abet them, will be considered traitors in the like degree" Note: The name Carragh is likely Gaelic for a stone pillar (a standing stone).

== Jacobites and Republicans ==
With the defeat of James II in 1690, most native Irish were reduced to the role of a servant class within their own country. In this era, Catholics are not permitted to vote, join the armed forces, bare arms, even for protection, or be educated as Catholics abroad. They made up 70% of the population of around 2 million, yet own only 5% of the land. While the hope that the Jacobites would regain their power diminished, new hope arose from abroad with the revolutions and new republics in USA and France.

- 1701 Charles McCawell (alias Cahir) sub leaser in Aghantaraghan (just below Poyntzpass), Orior Lower, County Armagh: "Defendant Edward Courtney replies, 6 Nov., 1701, that the said John O'Hanlon had a lease of said lands from Francis Lucas, Esq., who was guardian to Lucas Pointz, a minor, grandson and heir to Sir Toby Pointz, deceased, and the said lease commenced in or about Nov., 1694. Cahir McCawell, finding himself not able to pay the rent of the townland of Aghentaragh, applied to Edward Courtney, he then living near and having a considerable stock; and requested said Courtney to take said lease from him (McCaul), alleging that the lands were very convenient for his (Courtney's) stock. Courtney agreed to do so, provided Loghlin Donnelly made over his right and title thereto, which was so done. Donnelly the 2nd husband of Jane O'Hanlon soon afterward died without taking out probate of John O'Hanlon's will. Said Joane married a third time with Plt. Bryan Mullane, who in right of his wife came administrator of said John O'Hanlon, and has taken out probate of his will, and has become entitled to said lease, which he and his wife now demand from Edward Courtney..." Note: Sir Toby Pointz received a grant of 500 acres for his military service which was part of the forfeited lands of the O'Hanlons and built a fortress or bawn in Acton, County Armagh, half a mile above Poyntzpass with a colony of 24 cottages for English settlers.
- Diocese of Derry, Index of wills: Owen McCawell of Drumragh (ridge of the ringfort), (Omagh East, Tyrone), A.D. 1718. Thomas McCawell of Drumragh, 1723. Robert McCawell Drumragh, 1734. Hugh McCawell, 1737, to be buried in the churchyard of Clogher.
- Clogher Diocese District, Index of wills, Registry Armagh: Rev. Fergus McCawell, Cornamuck (Hill of the Pig), (Omagh East, Tyrone), 1758. Patrick McCawell, Bolies (Buaile 'summer milking place'), County Tyrone, A.D, 1790. Hugh McCawell, Aughanameena (fine/small field), County Monaghan, 1802. Owen McCawell, Cavan (Chabháin meaning Valley or Hollow), (Omagh East, Tyrone), 1806. Bernard McCawell, Scotstown, County Monaghan, 1809.
- 1700s Penal transportation: Micheal McCowell, County Tyrone, in March 1741, was convicted of being a vagabond with hundreds of other native Irish and ordered deported (usually to North America before 1776). Note: A vagabond is defined has someone without a home and/or a job. Charles and Edmund McCowell, County Tyrone, in April 1742, both convicted of sheep stealing and ordered deported. Pat Campbell, otherwise McCavill, County Armagh in 1742 was convicted of being a Vagabond and ordered deported. Examined by Deputy Clk. Edward Fleming. Note: "Sometimes Deportation ships were converted from slave-trading ships, the 100-plus transport vessels carried up to 300 convicts, in appalling conditions. Convicts who survived the horrendous passage were cleaned. Then they were advertised in newspapers and sold into indentured servitude, with men priced at up to 20 pounds and women up to 9 pounds. The human cargo trade made fortunes for those involved on both sides of the Atlantic" and encouraged a vicious cycle of colonial oppression and a corrupt justice system.
- 1758 James McCawell and Janet Martian christening of Dorothea McCawell on 1 Feb, in Irvine, Ayr, Scotland.
- 1766 Roger McCamel, George McCamel and Charles McCamel listed as "Papists{RC}" in Magherafelt in the Dioceses of Armagh in the barony of Loughenshollen, County Londonderry during the Religious census of Magherafelt County Londonderry, 28th day of March 1766.
- 1766 Robert McCawell. Fr. Robert McCawell is listed as being the parish priest of Camus, Tyrone.
- 1769 Muntgear McCawell, shop and Innkeeper on Short St, Charlestown, Boston
- 1780 Thomas McCawell. Father Thomas McCawell vicar general replaced Bishop Philip McDevitt as pastor of Urney, Tyrone when McDevitt is said to have removed his see from Urney to Derry about 1780. McCawell was a graduate of the Sorbonne in Paris.
- 1796 Spinning Wheel List: John McCawel [McCaul], awarded 2 spinning wheels. Hugh McAwel [McCaul], awarded 1 spinning wheel. (Flaxseed Premiums) Drumragh Parish, Omagh, Tyrone.
- The Defenders: Robert Caulfield tried in Dublin City in 1795, for being part of "The Defenders" an agrarian secret society and was sentenced to 7 years in penal servitude in Australia. Deported on the Britannia I in 1797, he "received 200 lashes for planning ship mutiny & allowing Miles Mulhalls irons to be cut" Note: Miles Mulhalls, originally a soldier in 55th Regiment, was tried for stealing spurs and sentenced to 7 years. He "escaped in Rio de Janeiro". 21 died on ship, including 6 defenders (political prisoners) died after receiving over 300 lashes, 2 women died, one who commit suicide by jumping overboard and another who tried the same outside Rio. About 40 Defenders (most were given Life sentences at trial) and one Orangeman were given 300 lashes for planning a mutiny and others given lashes for taking the defenders oath. An enquiry into the conduct of Captain Dennott (Demmett) was held in Sydney on his "callous and brutal" treatment of the convicts produced little consequence.
- James Caulfield, Catholic Bishop of Ferns, Wexford from 1786 to 1814. During the 1798 Rebellion, Bishop Caulfield like the other Irish Catholic bishops supported the government line. He was regarded as a collaborator (or mediator) with the British and he ordered all Catholics to surrender their arms and be loyal to "the good gracious King George III". He denounced Father Murphy and the other priests who took part in the Wexford Rising. (see poem by Seamus Heaney and song by Patrick Joseph McCall written 1898 Boulavogue) Note: With the promise of Catholic Emancipation in the late 1700s and the setup of Maynooth seminary in 1795 they probably considered it ill-advised to rock the boat. However many reformers despaired of peaceful change, particularly in the lack of Tithe reform.
- Cemetery headstone: IHS./ James McCawell died / May ye 5th, 1812. Aged 50 yrs./ Also his wife Eleanor / Martin died 1 February 1795 / Aged 55 yrs. Lord / Have Mercy on their souls. An inscriptions from Donaghcavey Cemetery (or Findonagh) Note: LATIN- in hoc signo spes mea (I.H.S.) – In this sign (the cross of Christ) is my hope.

== Famine and emigration ==
In 1801 the Act of Union was passed by the Parliament of Ireland abolishing itself in reaction to the Rebellion of 1798. The second United Irishmen Rebellion failed in 1802 and Catholic emancipation didn't happen until 1829, but without Tithe reform so the Tithe war followed from 1831 to 1836. Poverty, lack of opportunity, high rents and discrimination forced thousands to leave for North America, the largest exodus happening during the Great Irish Famine (1845–49) leading to an estimated 1 million deaths and emigration of a further 1 million people. However many emigrated before this time, and for some Nova Scotia was the first stop in the New World, where "McCaul Island", near Cape Breton, would bear testament to some family members new home. Many new branches of the family formed abroad including the "Caul" in Canada who many have gotten the "Mc" dropped in their name perhaps due to being orphaned as a result of the famine. Others came from better circumstances but still chose to emigrate. Still Catholics, faced much of the same institutionalized discrimination in the new world.

- Thomas McCawell (or Campbell), Parish of Fintona, County Tyrone. Listed in 1837 as being in the Ribbonmen, a popular movement active against landlords and their agents.
- 1847 Great Famine: John & Helen McCawell famine immigrants to Canada, died on route or on Grosse Isle, Quebec, Canada. Two of the (mostly Irish) 7553 buried there. The island was the site of an immigration depot which predominantly housed Irish immigrants coming to Canada, many on coffin ships, to escape the Great Famine, 1845–1849. During the Famine period, an estimated half-million Irish were evicted from their cottages. Many unscrupulous landlords simply paid to send their penniless tenant families overseas to British North America.
- 1847 Emigrants: Orphans. 16 August, John Caul, age 4, in good health. Richard Caul, 3, sick. 22 Aug, James Caul, 10, healthy, came on Marchioness of Abercorn. 2 Oct, Elizabeth Caul, 6, well. Listed as Adopted: Mary Caul, age 14, adopted by Mr. John Brooman. Taken from "Semi-monthly Return of RC Orphan Children in charge of the Archbishop of Quebec and principality... 12th July 1847". Also North American Passenger Lists 1847–1849, 19 May 1847, Derry to Philadelphia: John Caul 26 tailor and Margaret 21 spinster. The barque is listed as 'owned by F. S. Means and others of Boston' with F. S. Means as master.
- John McCaul (1807–1887), Irish-born musician, Canadian educator, theologian, and the second president of the University of Toronto from 1848 to 1853.
- Alexander McCaul (1799–1863), an Irish Hebraist and missionary to the Jews.
- Charles McCaul (1839–1900), Carpenter, Builder and Contractor in Philadelphia, PA in the late 1800s. He emigrated from Derry on board the Caledonia on 13 May 1867. Described as one of the most prominent builders in the US at the time of his death, he was "engaged in the building line from the earliest boyhood" in Derry. He built school houses, institutions, banks, factories, breweries, prisons, residences, powerhouses & car barns, store & office buildings, an early skyscraper, and hotels throughout the Philadelphia area.

== People ==
There was a late-nineteenth-century national revival of interest in the Irish language and Irish Gaelic culture (including folklore, sports, music and arts). Irish had diminished as a spoken tongue, partially as a result of the famine and poverty, remaining the main daily language only in isolated rural areas. Some of these figures were part of that revival.

- Patrick Joseph McCall (1861–1919), Irish songwriter and poet, known mostly for popular ballads: "Follow me up to Carlow", "The Boys of Wexford", "Boolavogue and "Kelly the Boy from Killanne"
- Seosamh Mac Cathmhaoil, (1879–1944), Irish poet and lyricist, remembered best for words he supplied to traditional airs, such as My Lagan Love
- Seaghan Mac Cathmhaoil (1883–1962), (brother of poet Seosamh), illustrator; author of engravings in Ethna Carbery, Winds of Eirinn (1906) and Art Nouveau illustrations for Mary Hutton's translation of the Táin Bó Cúailnge (1924 ed.), and other works including designs for the 1913 "Irish Historic Pageant", held at the 69th Regiment Armory in New York, United States
- Joseph John Campbell (1904–1987), Irish American mythologist, philosopher, writer and lecturer, best known for his work in comparative mythology, religion and many aspects of the human experience
- Brad McCaul, US Surfing Champion 1971, Psychology PhD, appeared in surfing documentary Pacific Vibrations(1970)
- Damien McCaul, Tyrone Gaelic footballer
- Gerry McCaul, former Dublin Gaelic football player and manager.
- Michael McCaul, American lawyer and politician, Republican U.S. Representative for Texas's 10th congressional district
- Simon Cowell (born 1959), English A&R executive, television producer, entrepreneur, and television personality
- Donna and Joseph McCaul, represented Ireland in the Eurovision Song Contest 2005
