= Heaney =

List for surname of Irish origins

Heaney, Ó hEignigh
- Language: Gaelic

Origin
- Meaning: descendant of horseman siu
- Region of origin: Ireland

Other names
- Variant forms: Ó hEanaigh, Eichnech, Eochaidh, Eicnig, Ó hEinigh, Ó hÉanaí, O'Heaney, Hegney, Heagney, O'Hicknie, O'Hicgnie, Haigney, O'Hicknie, ó hÉanna, Heeney, Higney

Heaney is a surname of Irish origin. It is an Anglicisation of the Gaelic Ó hEignigh, thought to be based on the Gaelic Eochaidh a personal name meaning "horseman". It was previously mistakenly thought to derive from Éan, Gaelic for Bird.

Versions of it are written in the Annals from the 8th century and has a diverse array of modern derivations and origins.

Heaneys were chiefs of Fermanagh and Kings of Airgíalla before the expansion south of Uí Néill branches Cenél Fearadhaigh and Cenél nEoghain into Airgíalla and the rise of The Maguires in Fermanagh. They became allies to repel the Normans in the 13th century.

- 1127, Gillachrist Ua hEighnigh, king of Feara-Manach, and chief king of Oirghiall, died in Clochar-Uí-nDaimhin (then the Royal capital of Airgíalla), after choice penance.

Notable people with this surname include:

- Aidan Heaney, retired English football player
- Andrew Heaney, baseball player
- Bob Heaney, Canadian former ice hockey player
- Charles Heaney, American photographer and painter
- Craig Heaney, British actor of screen, stage and radio
- Dermot Heaney, former Irish Gaelic footballer
- Francis Heaney, crossword compiler
- Frank Heaney, (1886–1937), Irish footballer
- Gerald William Heaney, (1918–2010), federal judge on the United States Court of Appeals
- Gerald Heaney (magician), (1899–1974), American magician
- Geraldine Heaney, Irish-Canadian ice hockey head coach
- Harry Heaney, emeritus Professor of Organic Chemistry
- Joe Heaney (AKA Joe Éinniú), (1919–1984), was an Irish traditional (sean nós) singer from County Galway, Ireland
- Katie Heaney, American writer
- Lawrence R. Heaney, American mammalogist, ecologist and biogeographer
- Mark Heaney, drummer
- Mehgan Heaney-Grier, champion free diver, fashion model, actress, conservationist, and TV personality
- Nathan Heaney (born 1989), English professional boxer
- Neil Heaney, English former footballer
- Noble Sproat Heaney (1880–1955), American gynecologist
- Patrick Heeney, (1881–1911), sometimes spelt Heaney, was an Irish composer whose most famous work is the music to the Irish national anthem "Amhrán na bhFiann" (English: "The Soldier's Song")
- Robert S. Heaney, author and Professor of Theology
- Sarah Heaney, Scottish television presenter
- Seamus Heaney (1939–2013), Irish poet, playwright and translator, awarded the Nobel Prize in Literature for 1995
- Stewart Heaney, Canadian cricketer
- Thomas Heaney, Australian rules footballer
- Tim Heaney, (1914–1996), South African cricketer
