= Sutra (disambiguation) =

A Sutra is a kind of text in Hinduism, Buddhism and Jainism. Sutra or Sutras may also refer to:

- Scomi SUTRA, the Mumbai monorail system
- Sutra (newspaper), a Serbian newspaper published for two months in 2007
- Sutras (album), a 1996 album by Scottish singer/songwriter Donovan
- Sistema Único de Trámite Legislativo (SUTRA), the legislative information database of the Legislative Assembly of Puerto Rico
- a condom brand sold by DKT International

== See also ==
- Sutta (disambiguation), in Pali
- Kama Sutra (disambiguation)
- Suture (disambiguation)
- Sutrah, a barrier used in prayer in Islam
- Sura, a division of the Quran in Islam
