= Tullanafoile =

Townland in County Tyrone, Northern Ireland

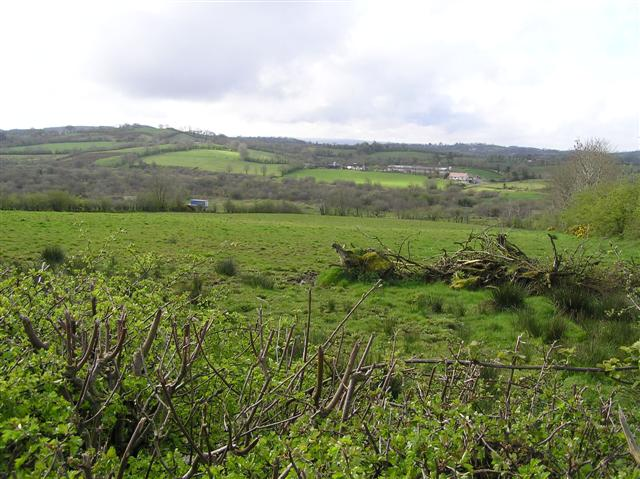
Tullanafoile townland in 2009

Tullanafoile is a townland in County Tyrone, Northern Ireland. It is situated in the barony of Clogher and the civil parish of Clogher and covers an area of 515 acres.

The name derives from the Irish: Tulaigh na Feola (Hill of the flesh) or tullach na f-aille (Hill of the cliff).

In 1841 the population of the townland was 200 people (32 houses) and in 1851 it was 180 people (27 houses).

== See also ==
- List of townlands of County Tyrone
