= Heagney =

Heagney is a surname. Notable people with the surname include:

- Denis Heagney (1898–1942), Australian rules footballer
- Muriel Agnes Heagney (1885–1974), Australian trade unionist and feminist
- Robert W. Heagney, American lawyer and politician

== See also ==
- Heaney
