= Cloneblaugh =

Townland in County Tyrone, Northern Ireland

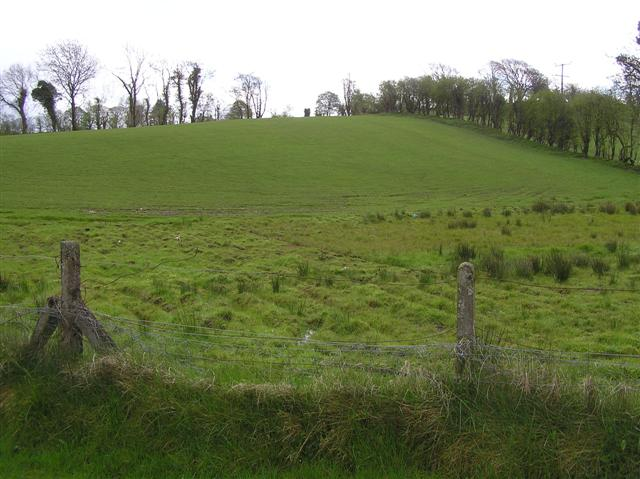
Cloneblaugh townland in 2009

Cloneblaugh is a townland in County Tyrone, Northern Ireland. It is situated in the historic barony of Clogher and the civil parish of Clogher and covers an area of 308 acres.

The name derives from the Irish: Cluain Bláthach (Flowery lawn or meadow).

The population of the townland declined during the 19th century:

Year	1841	1851	1861	1871	1881	1891
Population	150	95	90	75	68	58
Houses	27	17	16	13	13	14

== See also ==
- List of townlands of County Tyrone
