= Flaithbertach =

Flaithbertach is an Irish language male name meaning 'bright ruler'. It is also the origins of the Irish surname Flaithbheartaigh, Anglicised as Laverty and Lafferty in Ulster, and Flaverty and Flaherty in Connacht. It might refer to:

- Flaithbertach mac Loingsig (died 765), High King of Ireland
- Flaithbertach mac Inmainén (died 944), King of Munster and abbot of Scattery Island
- Flaithbertach Ua Néill (died 1036), King of Ailech
- Flaithbertach Mac Cathmhaoil (died 1238), arch-chief of Cenel-Feradhaigh, crown of championship and generosity of the Gaidhil (Irish Geal) and arch-chief, moreover, of Clann-Conghaile (Connelly) and Ui-Cennfhoda (Tirkennedy) in Tir-Manach (Fermanagh).
- Muireadhach ua Flaithbheartach (died 1034)
