= Tullanavert =

Townland in County Tyrone, Northern Ireland

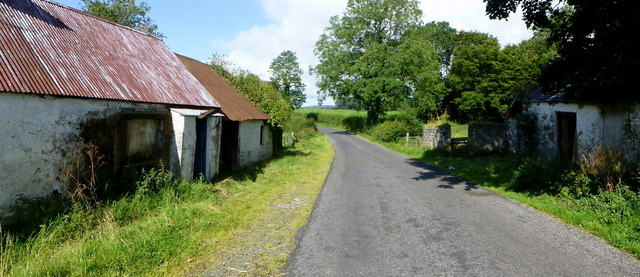
A road in Tullanavert

Tullanavert is a townland in County Tyrone, Northern Ireland. It is situated in the barony of Clogher and the civil parish of Clogher and covers an area of 246 acres.

The name derives from the Irish: Tulaigh na bhFeart (Hill of the Graves).

In 1841 the population of the townland was 130 people (19 houses) and in 1851 it was 101 people (15 houses).

The writer, William Carleton (1794 - 1869), was educated in local hedge schools in Clogher area including one in Tullanavert.

== See also ==
- List of townlands of County Tyrone
