= Tamlaght =

Tamlaght can refer to:

- Tamlaght, County Fermanagh, a small village in County Fermanagh, Northern Ireland
- Tamlaght, County Londonderry, a small village in County Londonderry, Northern Ireland
- Tamlaght, County Antrim, a townland in County Antrim, Northern Ireland
- Tamlaght, County Armagh, a townland in County Armagh, Northern Ireland
