= Moriertach Magenis =

Moriertach Magenis was a priest in Ireland during the 15th century.

The Incumbent at Derryvullan, he was Archdeacon of Clogher until his death on 18 February 1441.
