= Aughey =

Coordinates: 54.2772°N 7.5835°W

Aughney: Irish: Achadh Aodha
- Location within Northern Ireland
- County: County Fermanagh
- Country: Northern Ireland
- Sovereign state: United Kingdom
- Police: Northern Ireland
- Fire: Northern Ireland
- Ambulance: Northern Ireland

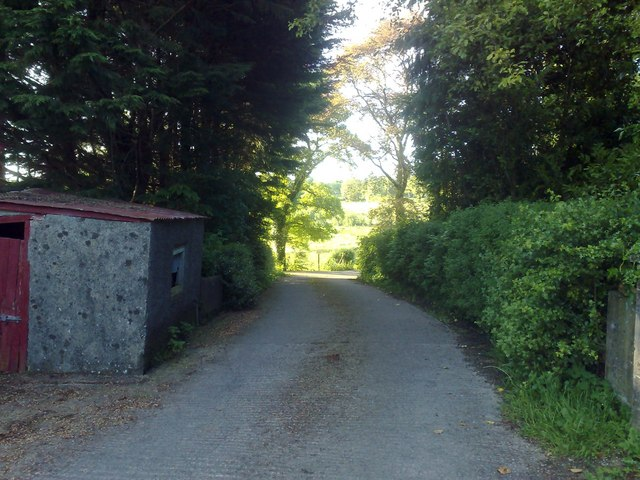
Laneway in Aughey townland in 2009

Aughey (from Irish Achadh Aodha, meaning 'Small Bear') is a townland of 109 acres in County Fermanagh, Northern Ireland. It is situated in the civil parish of Derryvullan and the historic barony of Tirkennedy.

== See also ==
- List of townlands in County Fermanagh
