= Tullylinton =

Townland in County Tyrone, Northern Ireland

Tullylinton is a townland in County Tyrone, Northern Ireland. It is situated in the barony of Clogher and the civil parish of Errigal Keerogue and covers an area of 176 acres.

The name derives from the Irish: Tulaigh Linton (Linton's hill) or tulaigh lanntain (Hill of the commons).

In 1841 the population of the townland was 99 people (13 houses) and in 1851 it was 60 people (13 houses).

The excavation of the site of a standing stone (grid ref:H610586) before the removal of the site, found no trace of a socket or ancient activity.

== See also ==
- List of townlands of County Tyrone
