= Milholland =

Milholland is a surname. Notable people with this surname include:

- Inez Milholland (1886–1916), American suffragist, lawyer and peace activist
- James Milholland (1887–1956), president of Pennsylvania State University
- John Milholland (1860–1925), American businessman
- R. K. Milholland (born 1975), American webcomic author
- Vida Milholland (1888–1952), American women's rights activist; sister of Inez

== Other ==
- Milholland Legal Eagle, an ultralight aircraft designed by Leonard Milholland

== See also ==
- Cary Millholland Parker (1902–2001), American landscape architect (note the different spelling)
- Mulholland
