= Tamlaght, County Fermanagh =

Coordinates: 54.3173°N 7.5801°W

Tamlaght: Irish: Tamhlacht
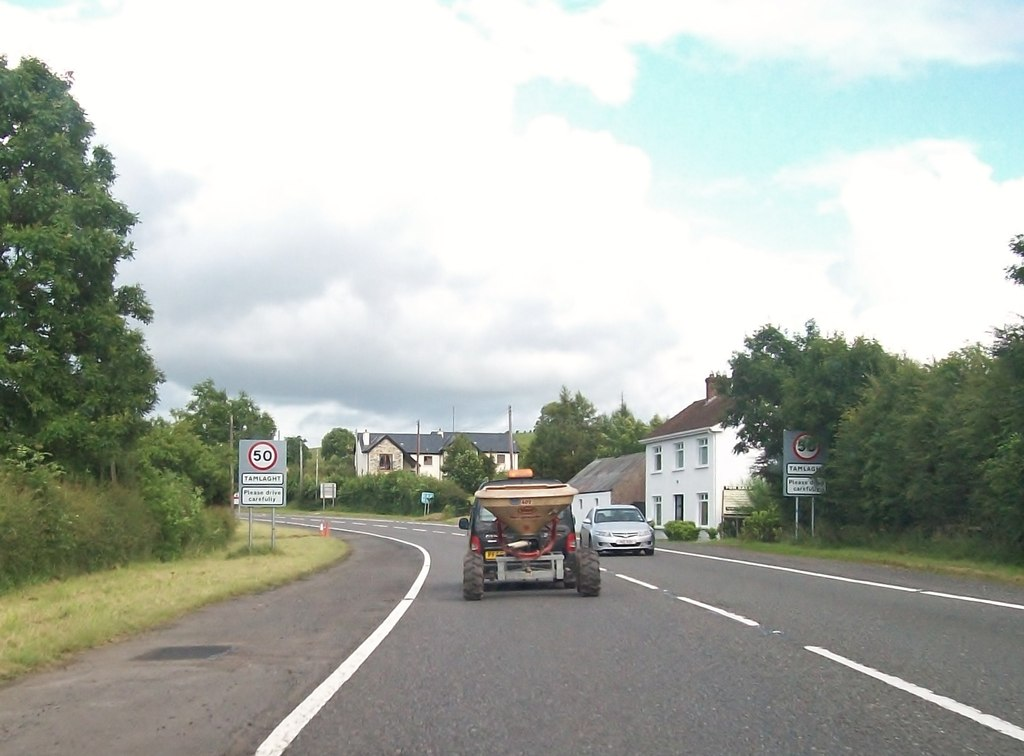
- Entering Tamlaght from Enniskillen

- Location within Northern Ireland
- Population: 341
- County: County Fermanagh
- Country: Northern Ireland
- Sovereign state: United Kingdom
- Post town: ENNISKILLEN
- Postcode district: BT74
- Dialling code: 028
- Police: Northern Ireland
- Fire: Northern Ireland
- Ambulance: Northern Ireland

Tamlaght (from Irish Tamhlacht, meaning 'burial pit, consisting of "támh", meaning plague, and "leacht", meaning grave or memorial stone') is a townland (of 185 acres) and village in County Fermanagh, Northern Ireland, 4.5 km south-east of Enniskillen. It is situated in the civil parish of Derryvullan and the historic barony of Tirkennedy. In the 2021 Census it had a population of 341 people.

== People ==
- Roy Carroll, goalkeeper who was brought up in Tamlaght
- Lord Anthony Hamilton, son of James Hamilton, 4th Duke of Abercorn, and Lady (Katie) Hamilton live at Killyreagh House, on Ballylucas Road.

== See also ==
- List of townlands in County Fermanagh
- List of towns and villages in Northern Ireland
