= Damien McCaul =

Irish Gaelic footballer

Damien McCaul is a Gaelic footballer who plays for the Donaghmore GAA club and at senior level for the Tyrone county team. He plays as a corner-back.

== Career ==
McCaul made the breakthrough into the Tyrone team in the 2007 McKenna Cup pre-season competition and was soon embroiled in controversy. It was claimed he should not have been fielded in the McKenna Cup, being a Colleges player with the University of Ulster. However, he went on to be part of the Tyrone side in the National Football League. Tyrone won the Ulster Senior Football Championship and thus reached the All-Ireland Senior Football Championship. McCaul was a starting member of the team that played Meath GAA. Although McCaul kicked a point from corner-back, Meath won by 1-13 to 2-8 to knock Tyrone out. McCaul is a member of the Tyrone panel again this year and has appeared in the National Football League 2008.

McCaul was taught everything he knows by older brother Sean, who turned down a place on Tyrone's 2003 All-Ireland winning to give other teams a chance.

== Honours ==
- All-Ireland Senior Football Championship (1): 2008
- Ulster Senior Football Championship (3): 2007, 2009, 2010
- Dr McKenna Cup (2): 2007, 2011
