= Sutta =

Sutta may refer to:

- The Pali version of the Sanskrit term Sutra
  - In Buddhism, a discourse of the Buddha: see Sutra and List of suttas
  - Sutta Nipata, is a Buddhist scripture
  - Sutta Piṭaka, The second of the three divisions of the Tripitaka or Pali Canon
- Sutta Pazham, is a 2008 Indian Tamil language adult comedy thriller film
- Sutta Kadhai, 2013 Indian Tamil-language black comedy film

== See also ==
- Sutra (disambiguation)
