= Arney (civil parish) =

Civil parish (administrative land area) in Northern Ireland

Arney (Cleenish)
- Civil parish
- Location within Northern Ireland
- Coordinates: 54.295474°N 7.640252°W
- Country: United Kingdom
- Region: Northern Ireland

Arney is a civil parish located in the barony of Clanawley and Tirkennedy in County Fermanagh, Northern Ireland. It is located in the Roman Catholic Diocese of Clogher.

== History ==
The parish of Arney was historically known as the parish of Cleenish (from Irish Claoininis).

== Area ==
The parish has a total area of 134.2 km² / 33,164.3 acres / 51.8 square miles.
