= Clanawley =

Clanawley Clann Amhlaoibh (Irish)
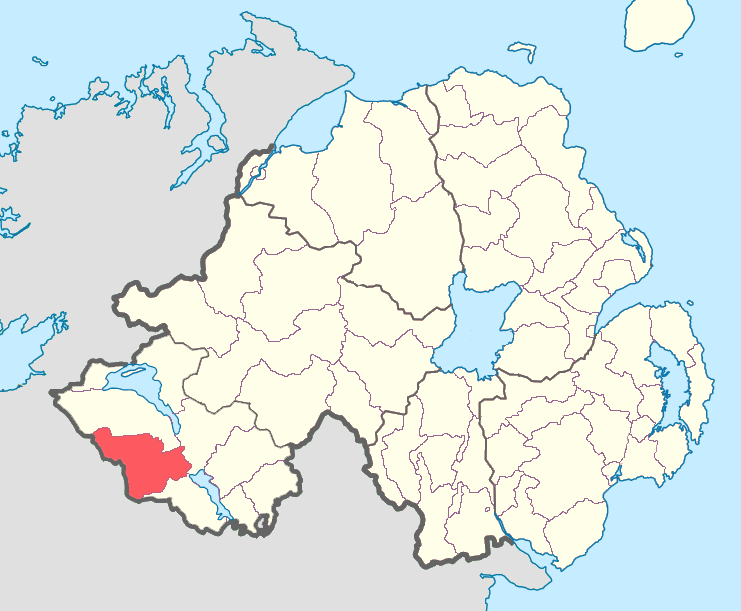
- Location of Clanawley, County Fermanagh, Northern Ireland.
- Sovereign state: United Kingdom
- Country: Northern Ireland
- County: Fermanagh

Clanawley (from Irish Clann Amhlaoibh 'Clan Awley') is a barony in County Fermanagh, Northern Ireland. To its east lies Upper Lough Erne, and it is bordered by three other baronies: Magheraboy to the north; Tirkennedy and Knockninny to the east. It also borders three baronies in the Republic of Ireland: Tullyhaw to the south; and Drumahaire and Rosclogher to the west.

== History ==
The territory of Clanawley was first recorded in 1306, and derives its name from Amhlaoibh, the son of the first Maguire king of Fermanagh, Donn Carrach Mag Uidhir. This makes the MacAwleys (Irish: Mac Amhlaoibh) a branch of the Maguires. The name Amhlaoibh is derived from the Norse name Olaf, which became popular in a number of Gaelic families.

Amblaoibh Mag Uidhir when he died in 1306 is noted as being the taísech (chief) of the small sept or territory of Muintir Pheodacháin. It was also spelt Clonawley and Scoticised to Glenawley during the plantation of Ulster.

== List of civil parishes ==
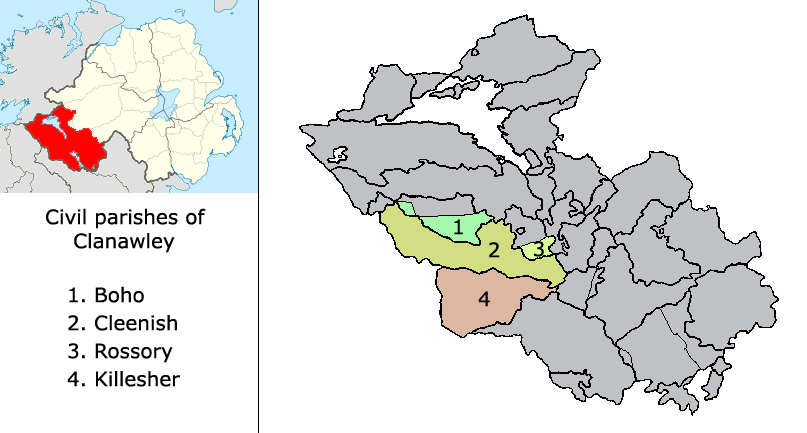
Civil parishes within the barony of Clanawley, County Fermanagh, Northern Ireland

Below is a list of civil parishes in Clanawley:

- Boho, County Fermanagh (split with barony of Magheraboy)
- Cleenish (split with baronies of Magheraboy and Tirkennedy)
- Killesher
- Kinawley (also partly in baronies of Knockninny, County Fermanagh and Tullyhaw, County Cavan)
- Rossory (split with barony of Magheraboy)
