= Noble Sproat Heaney =

American gynecologist (1880–1955)

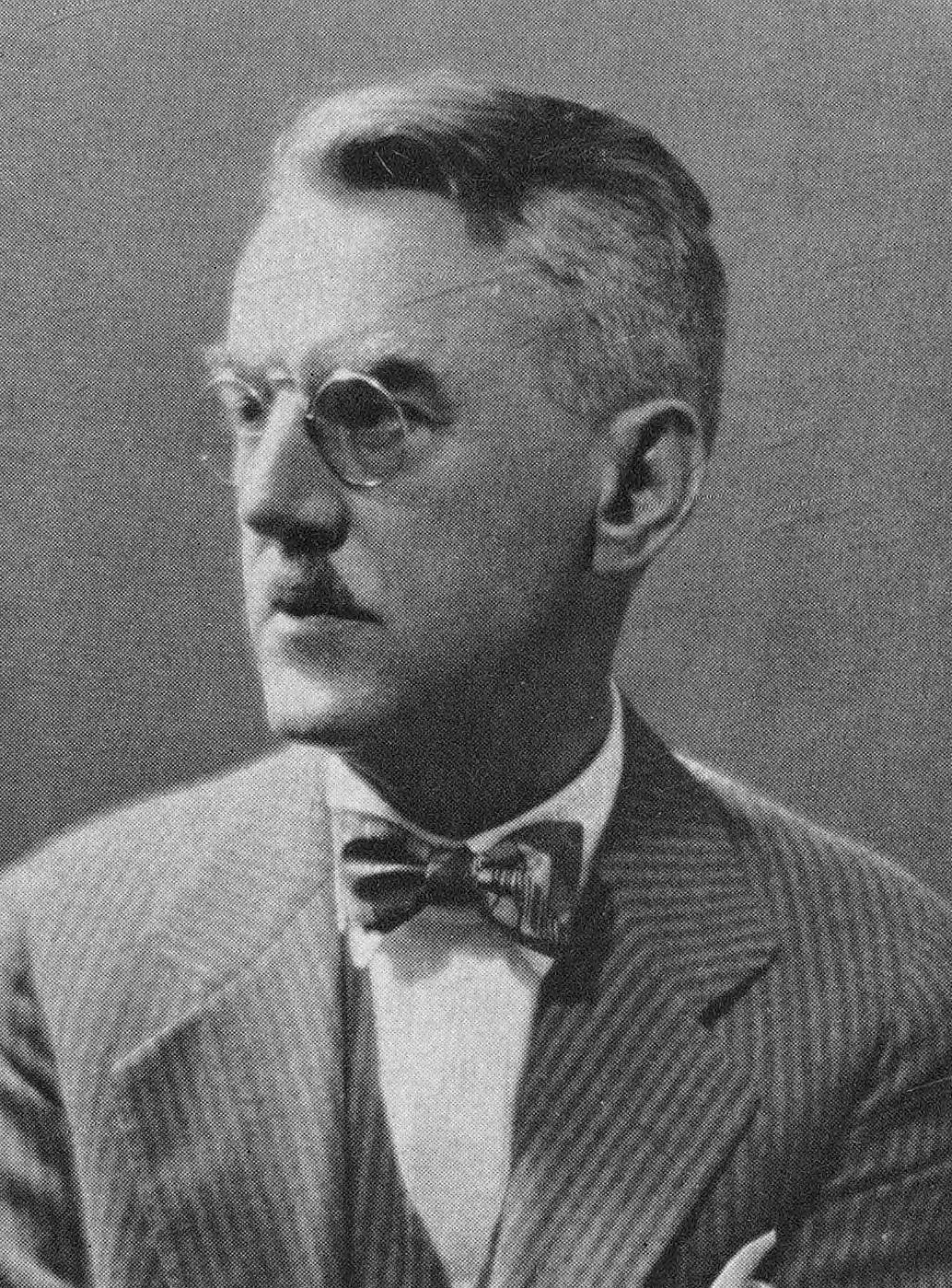
- Born: May 8, 1880; Mendon, Illinois, United States
- Died: September 26, 1955 (aged 75); Los Angeles, California, United States
- Occupation: Gynecologist
- Known for: Heaney stitch

Noble Sproat Heaney (May 8, 1880 – September 26, 1955) was an American gynecologist. Born to a family of farmers outside Mendon, Illinois, Heaney took up medicine and studied in Illinois and in Europe. He practiced at Presbyterian Hospital in Chicago, leading its gynecology department from 1919 until 1946, and taught at Rush Medical College. Heaney relocated to Los Angeles, California, in 1946, where he practiced at the Presbyterian and Hollywood Hospitals until his retirement in 1951. Heaney was a prominent proponent of vaginal approaches to hysterectomies. He developed several tools and techniques used in vaginal surgery, including the Heaney needle holder and the Heaney stitch.

== Biography ==
Heaney was born outside Mendon, Illinois, on May 8, 1880. The Heaneys were a family of farmers who lived in a log cabin, which had been built by Heaney's Irish-born grandfather upon immigrating to the United States and had reportedly been a stop on the Underground Railroad. Heaney was named after his uncle, Noble, with his middle name Sproat taken from his mother's maiden name. He went by Sproat Heaney.

Heaney enrolled at Knox College, where he completed his premedical education. During this period, his favorite aunt, Alice Heaney, died following a vaginal hysterectomy; in an obituary in the Proceedings of the Institute of Medicine of Chicago, Edward Allen attributed Heaney's interest in gynecology to her death. Heaney continued his studies at Rush Medical College in Chicago, graduating in 1904. After an internship at Presbyterian Hospital between January 1905 and July 1906, he moved to Omaha, Nebraska, where he served as an assistant to Palmer Findley. Heaney began to specialize in gynecology.

After working at the Presbyterian Hospital in Chicago and the University of Nebraska, Heaney decided to seek further instruction and traveled to Europe. From October 1907 through May 1908, he was at the Universitäts-Frauenklinik in Heidelberg, Germany, where he apprenticed under Alfons Rosthorn. He then moved to Vienna, Austria, interning at the Universitäts-Frauenklinik until February 1909 and working with Ernst Wertheim. In 1909, Heaney returned to the United States, again settling in Chicago. Heaney was a fellow of the American Gynecological Society, being elected in 1913 and serving as vice-president in 1931 and as president in 1938.

Heaney continued to practice at Presbyterian Hospital, where he headed the department of gynecology from 1919 to 1946. In the 1930s, Heaney began to advocate for the use of vaginal hysterectomies over abdominal approaches. He promoted a policy of "careful boldness", writing, "Those who persist in perfecting themselves in the technique of vaginal hysterectomy gradually disregard more and more of the contraindications so insistently laid down by those with little or no familiarity with the operation." In a 1935 article, at a time when subtotal abdominal approaches were the most common form of hysterectomy, he reported 627 surgeries using the vaginal approach and only 3 deaths.

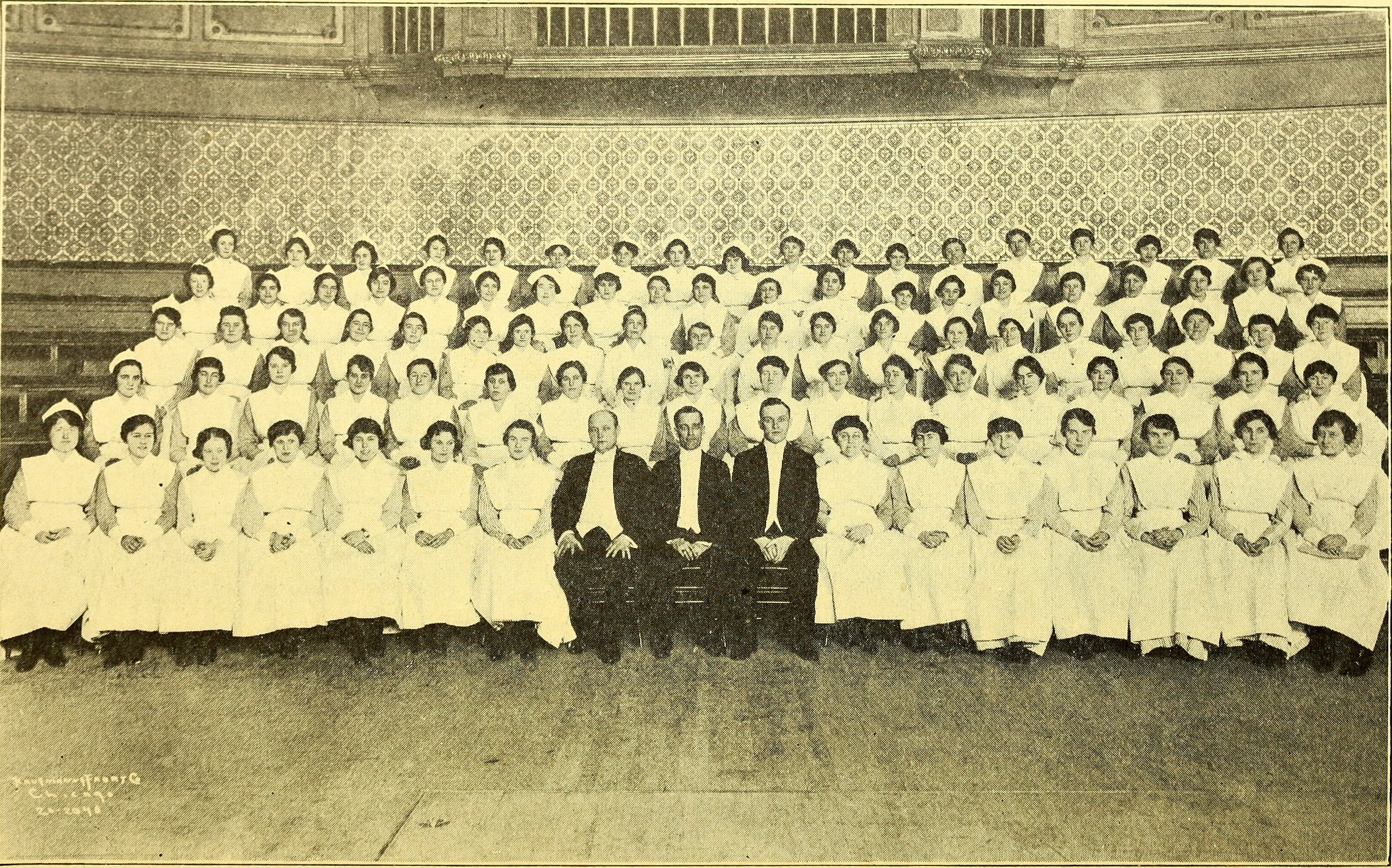
Heaney (center) at Presbyterian Hospital, 1919

Heaney designed several tools for vaginal surgery, including the Heaney needle holder and Heaney clamps. Heaney also developed the Heaney stitch, an approach to vaginal hysterectomies in which the peritoneum is closed with a pursestring suture after the parametrial stumps are sutured extraperitoneally to the lateral vaginal wound. This approach provides lateral support, which helps prevent prolapse and avoids intraperitoneal bleeding.

In 1943, Heaney served as president of the medical staff at Presbyterian Hospital under medical director William G. Hibbs. He also taught at Rush Medical College, where he served as chairman of the Department of Obstetrics and Gynecology. He moved to Los Angeles in 1946. He continued to practice medicine until 1951, working at the Presbyterian and Hollywood Hospitals. A heavy smoker, Heaney was treated for gastric ulcers on several occasions. Heaney died on September 26, 1955, of cerebrovascular disease.

== Personal life ==
Heaney married twice. He married Floy Chamberlin of Rockford, Illinois, in 1908, while he was the United Kingdom. This marriage produced four children. At the time of his death, Heaney was married to Ruth Ainsworth Heaney. Concurrently with his practice, Heaney ran a commercial dairy farm in Glen Ellyn, Illinois. The farm exhibited its bulls and cows at the Illinois State Fair.

== Selected publications ==
- Heaney, N. Sproat (1934). "A Report of 565 Vaginal Hysterectomies Performed for Benign Pelvic Disease". American Journal of Obstetrics and Gynecology. 28 (5): 751–755. doi:10.1016/S0002-9378(34)90071-5.
- Heaney, N. Sproat (1935). "A Series of 627 Vaginal Hysterectomies Performed for Benign Disease with Three Deaths". American Journal of Obstetrics and Gynecology. 30 (2): 269–272. doi:10.1016/S0002-9378(35)90172-7.
- Heaney, N. Sproat (1940). "Vaginal Hysterectomy – Its Indications and Technique". The American Journal of Surgery. 48: 284–288. doi:10.1016/S0002-9610(40)90259-8.

== Works cited ==
- Allen, Edward (1956). "Noble Sproat Heaney (Obituary)". Proceedings of the Institute of Medicine of Chicago. 21: 43–45.
- Annual Announcement and Catalogue of the Rush Medical College. Vol. 3. Chicago: Rush Medical College. 1934.
- Annual Report of the Presbyterian Hospital in the City of Chicago. Chicago: Presbyterian Hospital of Chicago. 1943.
- "A Quincy Boy Is Married". Quincy Journal. Quincy, Illinois. October 3, 1908. p. 5.
- Baskett, Thomas F. (2005). "Hysterectomy: Evolution and Trends". Best Practice & Research Clinical Obstetrics & Gynaecology. 19 (3): 295–305. doi:10.1016/j.bpobgyn.2004.11.007. PMID 15985249.
- Baskett, Thomas F. (2019). "Heaney, Noble Sproat (1880–1955)". Eponyms and Names in Obstetrics and Gynaecology. Cambridge University Press. pp. 176–177. doi:10.1017/9781108421706.140. ISBN 978-1-108-33671-0.
- "Dr. Noble S. Heaney". The New York Times. New York. September 28, 1955. p. 35.
- "Illinois State Fair". Guernsey Breeder's Journal. Vol. 50, no. 7. October 1, 1936. pp. 572–574.
- Keene, Floyd Elwood (1930). Album of the Fellows of the American Gynecoogical Society, 1876-1930. Philadelphia: William J. Dornan.
- Miskry, Tariq; Magos, Adam (2001). "Mass Closure: A New Technique for Closure of the Vaginal Vault at Vaginal Hysterectomy". British Journal of Obstetrics and Gynaecology. 108 (12): 1295–1297. doi:10.1016/S0306-5456(01)00299-6. PMID 11843394.
