= Tim Heaney =

South African cricketer (1914–1996)

Personal information
- Full name: John Llewellyn Heaney
- Born: 14 August 1914; Mossel Bay, Cape Province, South Africa
- Died: 14 July 1996 (aged 81); Humansdorp, Eastern Cape, South Africa
- Batting: Left-handed
- Bowling: Slow left-arm orthodox

Domestic team information
- Years: Team
- 1934–35 to 1950–51: Transvaal

Career statistics
Competition	First-class
Matches	29
Runs scored	277
Batting average	11.08
100s/50s	0/0
Top score	47
Balls bowled	8060
Wickets	100
Bowling average	21.83
5 wickets in innings	5
10 wickets in match	0
Best bowling	6/45
Catches/stumpings	3/0
- Source: Cricinfo, 6 October 2020

John Llewellyn "Tim" Heaney (14 August 1914 – 14 July 1996) was a South African cricketer who played first-class cricket for Transvaal from 1935 to 1952.

Tim Heaney was an accurate slow-left-arm spin bowler. In his first Currie Cup match after World War II he took 6 for 45 off 28 eight-ball overs in the first innings against Rhodesia. A week earlier, in a first-class friendly match against Natal, he had taken 6 for 73 off 33 overs in a match Transvaal lost by an innings.
