= Charles Heaney =

American painter and printmaker

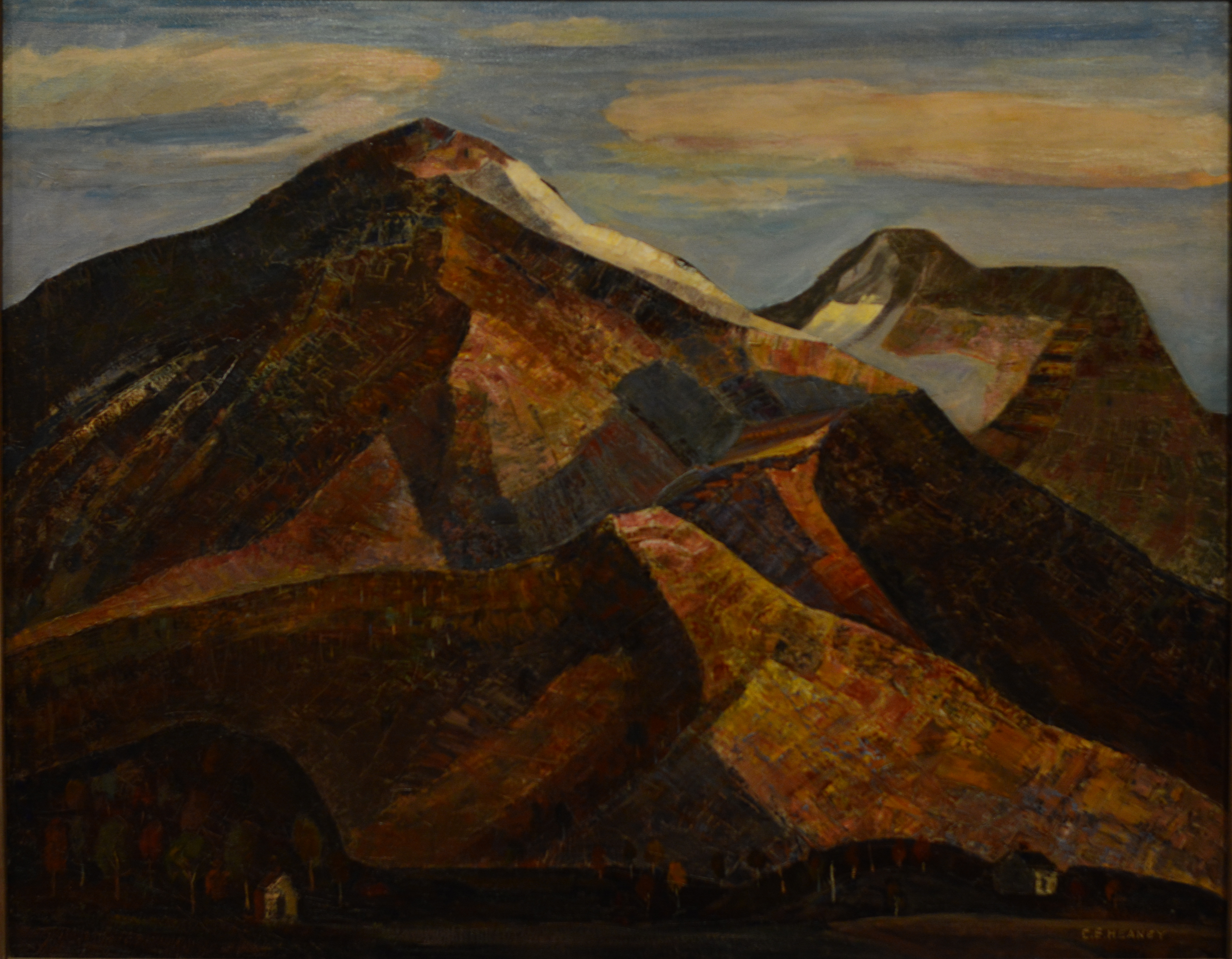
Mountains, a 1938 oil painting by Charles Heaney

Charles Edward Heaney (1897–1981) was an American painter and printmaker. During the Great Depression in the 1930s, he worked for the Works Progress Administration as an artist and did several works featuring Mount Hood and Timberline Lodge as the subject matter.

== Early life ==
Charles Heaney was born on August 22, 1897, in Oconto Falls, Wisconsin. His father died, then Charles moved with his mother and sister to Portland, Oregon, in 1913. At 16 or 17, he apprenticed as an engraver, but dabbled in art until he attended the Museum Art School in Portland.

== Career ==
Although Heaney started as a painter, he moved toward printmaking later as his career progressed. Like many Oregon artists, he was strongly influenced by his friend C. S. Price. Heaney adopted C.S. Price's ideal of the simple life, with almost obsessive dedication to his art.

Heaney loved Eastern Oregon, where he traveled extensively and regularly worked from memory or sketches when he returned to the studio to paint the landscapes he loved. Like Price, Heaney spent time as a WPA artist in the 1930s, painting several pictures for the Timberline Lodge on Mount Hood, several of which still hang in the lodge.

In 1980, the Oregon Historical Society honored Charles Heaney with an extensive exhibit of his life's work, borrowed from many private collections. In 1982, a year after Heaney's death, Bush Barn Art Center in Salem, Oregon, featured an extensive retrospective, showing many paintings not previously exhibited. In 2005, a retrospective of his work with more than 100 paintings and prints was put on by the Hallie Ford Museum of Art at Willamette University in Salem. Heaney died in 1981 in Portland.
