= Mulholland =

Mulholland or Mullholland (/mʌlˈhɒlənd/ mul-HOL-ənd) is a surname. It is the anglicized form of Irish: Ó Maolchalann, lit. '"descendant of Maolchalann", a personal name meaning "chief of the calends"'.

Notable people with the surname include:

- Alan Mulholland, Irish Gaelic footballer and manager
- Bob Mulholland, "senior advisor and longtime chief spokesperson" of the California Democratic Party
- Clara Mulholland (1849–1934), Irish writer
- Colm Mulholland (1928 or 1929–2025), Irish Gaelic footballer
- Dale Mulholland, former US professional soccer player
- Evan Mulholland, Australian politician
- Frank Mulholland, Lord Mulholland PC KC (born 1959), Scottish judge
- Greg Mulholland (born 1970), British politician
- Helen Mulholland, master blender of Irish whiskey
- Inez Mullholland, suffragist, labor lawyer, World War I correspondent, and public speaker
- Jim Mulholland (born 1949), American screenwriter
- Jimmy Mulholland (1938–1994), Scottish footballer
- Joe H. Mulholland, American politician
- Joan Trumpauer Mulholland, Civil Rights / integration activist
- Josiah Mulholland, Irish Gaelic footballer
- Peter Mulholland (c.1953–2021), Australian rugby league football coach
- Robert Mulholland, politician and businessman of Ontario
- Rosanne Mulholland, Brazilian actress
- St. Clair Augustine Mulholland, American Civil War colonel
- Terry Mulholland, former Major League Baseball pitcher
- William Mulholland, civil engineer in Los Angeles circa 1900

== See also ==
- Milholland
- Mulholland Drive, Los Angeles
- Mulholland Madness
- Mulholland Drive (film)
- Mulholland Falls
- "Mullholland", the seventh episode of the first season of Kipo and the Age of Wonderbeasts.
