= Katie Heaney =

American writer (born 1986)

- Born: 1986 (age 39–40); Minnesota, United States
- Website: www.katieheaney.com

Katie Heaney (born 1986) is an author and former BuzzFeed editor and senior writer for The Cut. Her books include Never Have I Ever, Dear Emma, Would You Rather?, Girl Crushed, and The Year I Stopped Trying.

== Career ==
Heaney's first book, written while she was working as an editor at BuzzFeed, was Never Have I Ever: My Life (So Far) Without a Date, published in 2014. The memoir chronicles her life up until age 25 and recounts how she had not, before that point, had a boyfriend.

In 2016, Heaney's modernization of Jane Austen's Emma was published.

In 2018, Heaney published a second memoir, Would You Rather?: A Memoir of Growing Up and Coming Out. Would You Rather? deals with Heaney's path to coming out and realizing her sexuality.

Her first young adult novel, Girl Crushed, was published in 2020.

Her second young adult novel, The Year I Stopped Trying, was published in 2021. In 2021, Heaney published a controversial article in The Cut titled, "The Memory War."

Shortly after, fellow journalist Carrie Poppy released a series of letters to the editor on Medium, including one from memory expert Elizabeth Loftus, demonstrating a large number of factual and contextual errors committed by Heaney in her recount of statements made by her interviewees and her summary of memory research.

== Personal life ==
Heaney was born and raised in St. Paul and Shoreview, Minnesota. She came out as gay at age 28 in 2015. From 2019 to 2023, Heaney was married to Lydia Jackson. She now lives in Los Angeles.

== Works ==
- Never Have I Ever: My Life (So Far) Without a Date (2014)
- Dear Emma (2016)
- Public Relations (2017 – with Arianna Rebolini)
- Would You Rather?: A Memoir of Growing Up and Coming Out (2018)
- Girl Crushed (2020)
- The Year I Stopped Trying (2021)
