= Sutrah =

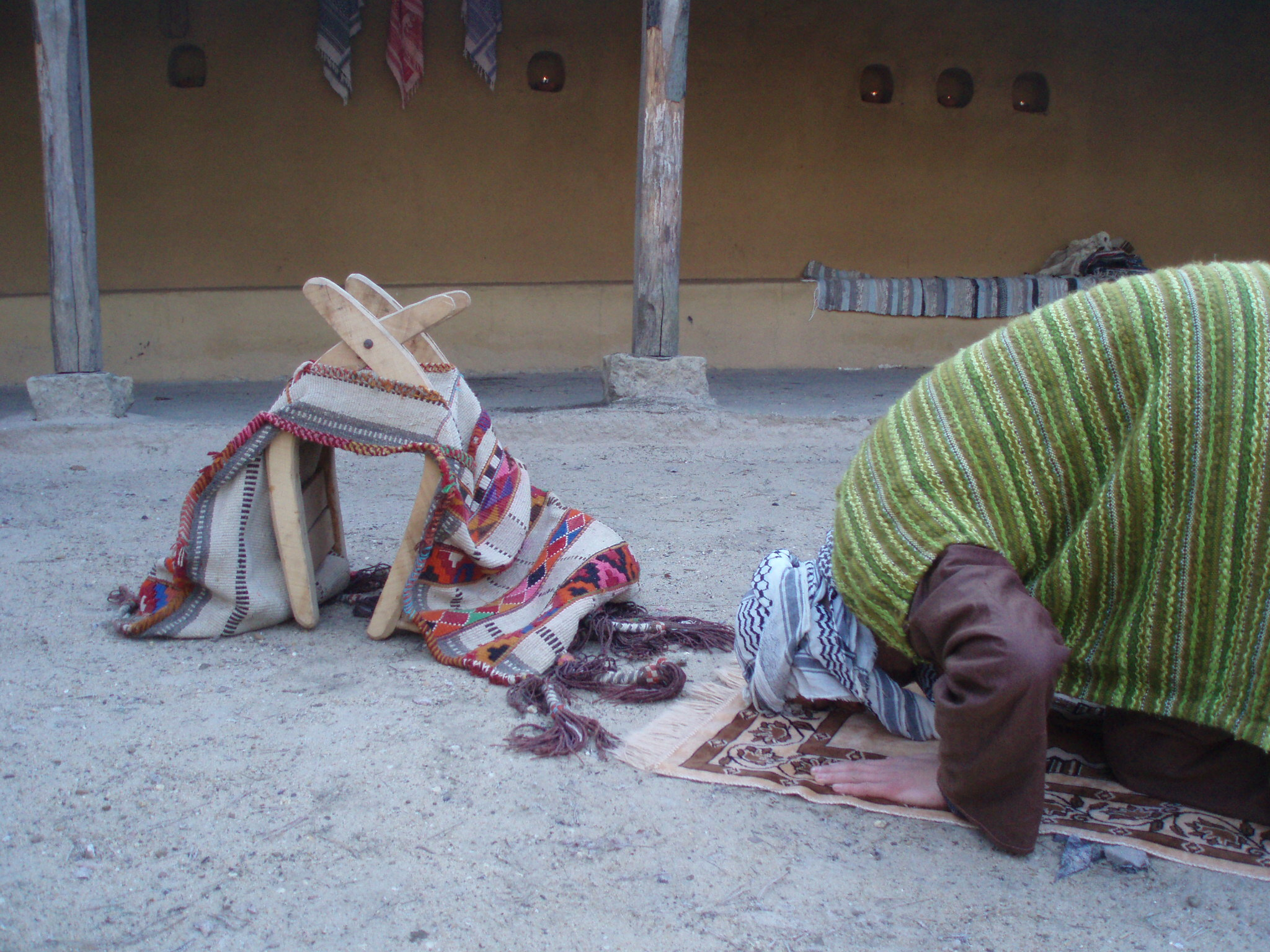
Muslim prayer with using a sutrah

A sutrah (Arabic: سترة lit., "screen, cover") is an object used by a person performing salat as a barrier between himself and one passing in front of him. The person praying should be positioned at less than or equal to three forearms' length away from the Sutrah. The Sutrah’s height must be no less than one forearm's length (i.e. the height of the rear end of a camel's saddle), whereas its width has no stipulated size. The Sutrah is compulsory for anyone performing salat (unless a Sutrah cannot be found after searching).

While it is apparent that it might appear like the performer is praying to the object in front of him/her, it's not absolutely necessary while praying. It can be substituted by facing a wall or simply blocking the way of a passer with a hand. It is also forbidden for someone to pass in-between a person praying and his Sutrah, or to pass closer than 3 forearms' length to the person who has no Sutrah in front of him (because 3 forearms' length is the furthest distance which one can stay away from a Sutrah). However, a person is allowed to pass between the rows of a congregational salat.

== Hadiths related to Sutrah ==
Sahl ibn Abu Hathmah narrated: رواه سهل بن أبو هاثماه The Prophet said: "When one of you prays facing a sutrah he should keep close to it, and not let the devil interrupt his prayer."

Abu Saeed Al Khudri narrated: رواه أبو سعيد الخدري The Prophet said: "When one of you prays facing a sutrah he should keep close to it, and not let anyone pass in front of it."

The Messenger of Allah said: لا تصل إلا إلى سترة، ولا تدع أحداً يمر بين يديك، فإن أبى فلتقاتله؛ فإن معه القرين "Pray facing a sutrah, and let no one cross in front of you while praying. If he insists, then prevent him by force because he is accompanied by shaitan."

Taking sutrah is a confirmed Sunnah as narrated in many hadiths. For example, it was narrated from `Abdur-Rahman ibn Abu Sa`id that his father said: “The Messenger of Allah (peace be upon him) said: ‘When anyone of you performs prayer, let him pray facing towards a Sutrah, and let him get close to it, and not let anyone pass in front of him. If someone comes and wants to pass in front of him, let him fight him, for he is a Shaitan (Satan).’”

== Rulings on Sutrah ==
According to Hanafi Madhab, one's prayer will not be nullified if someone crosses one without sutrah.

== See also ==
- Salat
