= Derryvullan =

Derryvullan: Irish: Doire Mhaoláin
- County: County Fermanagh
- Country: Northern Ireland
- Sovereign state: United Kingdom
- Police: Northern Ireland
- Fire: Northern Ireland
- Ambulance: Northern Ireland

Derryvullan (from Irish Doire Mhaoláin, meaning 'Mullan's oak wood') is a civil parish and townland (of 296 acres) in County Fermanagh, Northern Ireland. The civil parish is situated in the historic baronies of Tirkennedy and Lurg. Derryvullan townland is in the portion of the parish of the same name in Tirkennedy.

The ruins of an 18th-century church mark the site of an early church in Derryvullan.

== Civil parish of Derryvullan ==
The civil parish includes the villages of Irvinestown and Lisnarick and the house at Castle Coole.

=== Townlands ===
The civil parish includes the following townlands:

=== A ===
Agharainy, Arda, Ardlougher, Aughey

=== B ===
Ballindullagh Inward, Ballindullagh Outward, Ballintarsan, Ballymactaggart, Boyaghan, Bracky, Brownhill, Bunaninver, Burfits Hill

=== C ===
Cantytrindle, Carran Little, Carranboy, Carry, Cassidy, Castle Coole, Castle Irvine Demesne, Cavanacross, Cavancarragh, Clenaghisle, Cloghcor, Coolaness, Coolbuck, Coolisk, Crockaleen, Cules Long, Cules Short, Cullaghmore, Cultiagh, Curraghlare

=== D ===
Derrybeg, Derryclawan, Derryhillagh, Derrynanny, Derryveone, Derryvullan, Doonan, Dring, Drogan, Dromore, Drumadravy, Drumaran, Drumarky, Drumbo, Drumbulcan, Drumcaw, Drumcrin, Drumcrooil, Drumduff, Drumhirk, Drumhoney, Druminshin Beg, Druminshin More, Druminshinardagh, Drummal, Drummee, Drummonaghan, Drumpeen, Drumsara, Drumshane, Drumskool, Drumsluice, Drumskea, Duross

=== E ===
Ederdaglass (also known as Hollybank)

=== F ===
Farnaght, Feddan, Forthill

=== G ===
Gaffer Island, Glenall, Glenkeen, Glenross, Gortmessan, Gull Rock

=== H ===
Hollybank (also known as Ederdaglass), Horse Island, County Fermanagh, Horse Island

=== I ===
Inish Conra, Inish Dacharne, Inish Davar, Inish Divann, Inish Doney, Inish Garve, Isle Namanfin

=== K ===
Keeran, Killyvannan, Knock Island, Knockroe (Archdall), Knockroe (Irvine)

=== L ===
Lackaghboy, Leambreslen, Levaghy, Lignameeltoge, Liscreevin, Lisreagh, Lissan

=== M ===
Milltate, Milltate, Monalla, Moneykee, Mountdrum, Moynaghan North, Moynaghan South, Mullies, Mullybrack, Mullybreslen, Mulrod

=== R ===
Rahall, Rossachrin, Rossclare, Rossfad, Rossgweer, Rossigh, Rossinnan, Rossmore

=== S ===
Shallany, Shankill, Slee, County Fermanagh, Slee

=== T ===
Tamlaght, Tatnamallaght, Tattygare, Tattymacall, Tedd, Townhill, Tully, Tullyclea, Tullylammy, Tullynagarn

=== W ===
Whitehill North, Whitehill South

== See also ==
- List of townlands in County Fermanagh
- List of civil parishes of County Fermanagh
