= Magheraboy =

Magheraboy An Machaire Buí (Irish)
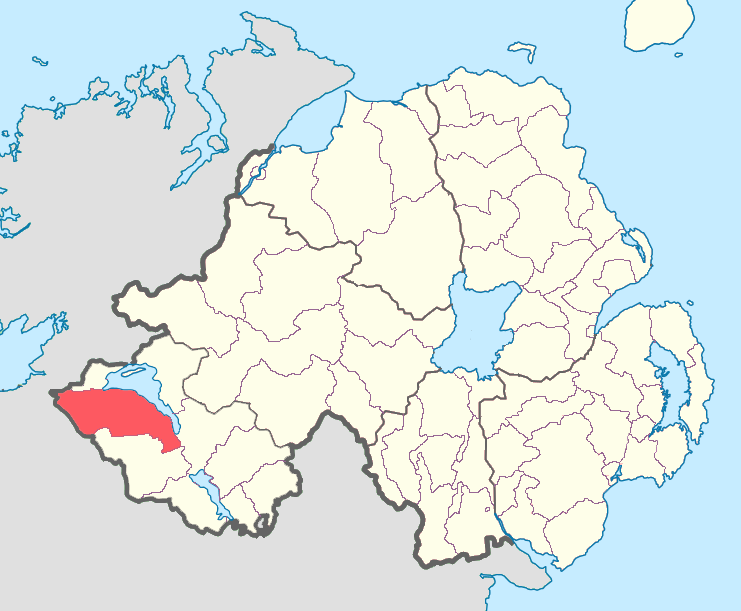
- Location of Magheraboy, County Fermanagh, Northern Ireland.
- Sovereign state: United Kingdom
- Country: Northern Ireland
- County: Fermanagh

Magheraboy (from Irish machaire buí 'yellow plain') is a barony in County Fermanagh, Northern Ireland. To its east lies Lower Lough Erne, and it is bordered by three other baronies in Northern Ireland: Lurg to the north; Tirkennedy to the east; and Clanawley to the south It also borders two baronies in the Republic of Ireland: Tirhugh to the north; and Rosclogher to the south. The westernmost point (near the Irish farm Mangern) of Magheraboy is also the westernmost point of Northern Ireland. (8° 10' 38" west of Greenwich).

== History ==
The name Magheraboy doesn't receive a mention until 1585, when it is described in the Composition Book of Connacht as "the halfe Toe (tuatha) of Magheraboy". It was the Composition of Connacht in 1585, during the reign of Elizabeth I, that most of the modern baronies and counties of Ulster would first be created.

The barony's boundaries, however, coincide with those of an ancient territory known as Tuath Ratha (people/tribe of the fort), the principal family of which was the O'Flanagans (Irish: Ó Flannagáin), the ruling family of the Cenél Cairbre Tuath Ratha. The O'Flanagans were an important medieval family based at Ballyflanagan (present day townland of Aghamore) in Magheraboy, and they once controlled the entire western side of Lower Lough Erne from Belleek to Belmore Mountain.

The O'Flanagans were related to the ruling family of the Uí Néill kingdom of Cairbre Droma Cliabh. Another small sept of the Uí Néill, the Cenél Láegaire, settled in Magheraboy in the early Christian period.

== List of main settlements ==
- Belleek (south of the River Erne)
- Derrygonnelly
- Enniskillen (west of the River Erne)

== List of civil parishes ==
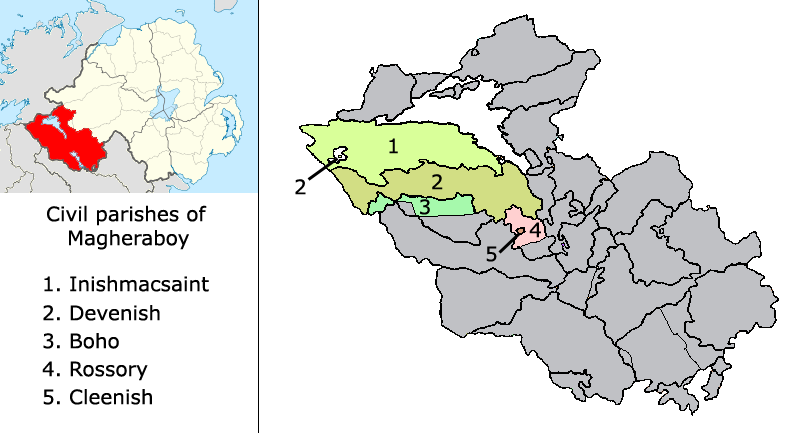
Civil parishes within the barony of Magheraboy, County Fermanagh, Northern Ireland

Below is a list of civil parishes in Magheraboy:

- Boho (split with barony of Clanawley)
- Cleenish (split with the baronies of Clanawley and Tirkennedy)
- Devenish
- Inishmacsaint
- Rossorry (split with barony of Clanawley)
