= Suture =

Suture, literally meaning "seam", may refer to:

== Arts, entertainment, and media ==
- Suture (album), a 2000 album by American Industrial rock band Chemlab
- Suture (film), a 1993 film directed by Scott McGehee and David Siegel
- Suture (band), an early 1990s band with Kathleen Hanna, Sharon Cheslow, and Doug Birdzell

== Healthcare ==
- Suture (anatomy), a rigid joint between hard parts of animals
  - Suture (joint), concerning the major joints in the bones of the cranium
  - Ammonitic suture, the intersection of the septum with the outer shell in ammonites
  - Facial suture (trilobite), divisions in the cephalon (head) of most trilobites, along which the exoskeleton splits during molting
- Surgical suture, a stitch used by doctors and surgeons to hold tissue together

== Science ==
- Suture (geology), a major fault through an orogen or mountain range
- Suture, a seam in a fruit capsule
