= Tirkennedy =

Tirkennedy Tír Cheannada (Irish)
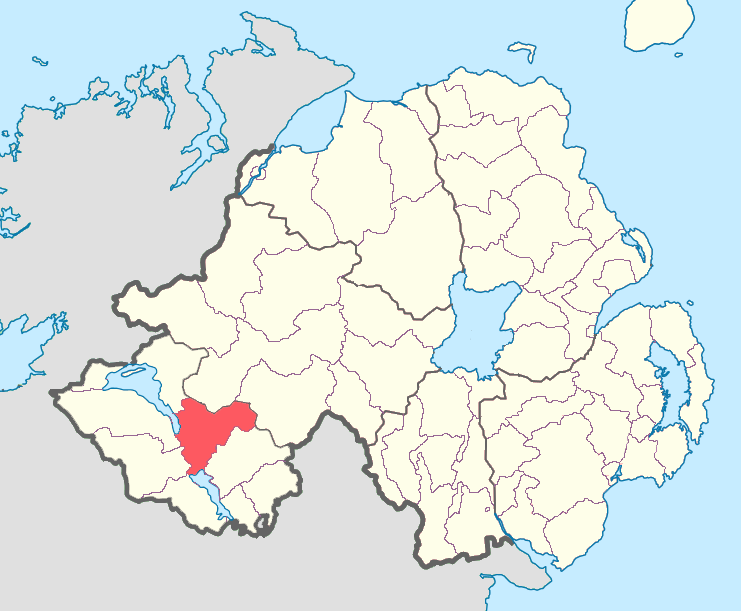
- Location of Tirkennedy, County Fermanagh, Northern Ireland.
- Sovereign state: United Kingdom
- Country: Northern Ireland
- County: Fermanagh

Tirkennedy (from Irish Tír Cheannada 'country of the long-head') is a barony in County Fermanagh, Northern Ireland. To its west lies Lower Lough Erne and south Upper Lough Erne, and it is bordered by seven other baronies: Clanawley and Magheraboy to the west; Lurg and Omagh East to the north; Clogher to the east; Magherastephana and Knockninny to the south.

== History ==
Despite its name, Tirkennedy has nothing to do with the modern personal name of Kennedy, which derives from Cennétig (ugly/rough headed). Rather it takes its name from the epithet of Fergus son of Cremthann, the eponymous ancestor of the Ui Chremthainn, the predominant tribe of the western Airgialla. Fergus lived in the late fifth century AD. He was known as Cennfhota (long-head). His descendants became known as the Ui Chennfhota, with the kingdom of Tir Cennfhota receiving its first mention in the Annals in 1349.

Chieftains of Tirkennedy at the beginning of the Maguire’s reign over Fermanagh in the late 1200s were the Magunshinan, originally Mac Uinsionnain but anglicised to Nugent. The Devine (Irish: Ó Daimhín) sept were cited as Lords of Tirkennedy, and were a leading Fermanagh sept up to and including the fifteenth century, when the O'Neills broke their power to the north and the Maguires to the south. Under the Maguires, the MacManus sept became hereditary supervisors of the fisheries in Tirkennedy.

The early Anglicisation of "Tircannada" recorded in the 1609 escheated counties map is claimed as being more accurate than the present form of "Tirkennedy".

== List of main settlements ==
- Ballinamallard
- Enniskillen (east of the River Erne)
- Lisbellaw
- Tempo

== List of civil parishes ==
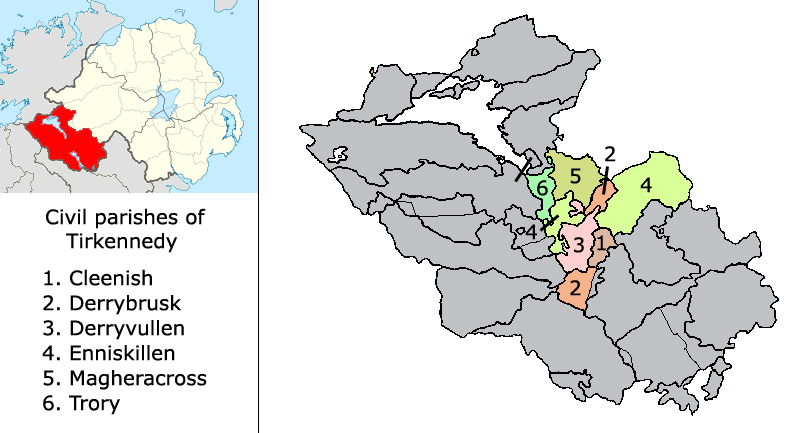
Civil parishes within the barony of Tirkennedy, County Fermanagh, Northern Ireland

Below is a list of civil parishes in Tirkennedy:

- Cleenish (split with baronies of Magheraboy and Clanawley)
- Derrybrusk (also partly in barony of Magherastephana)
- Derryvullan (also partly in barony of Lurg)
- Enniskillen
- Magheracross (split with barony of Omagh East)
- Trory (also partly in barony of Lurg)
