= Clogher (barony) =

Clogher Clochar (Irish)
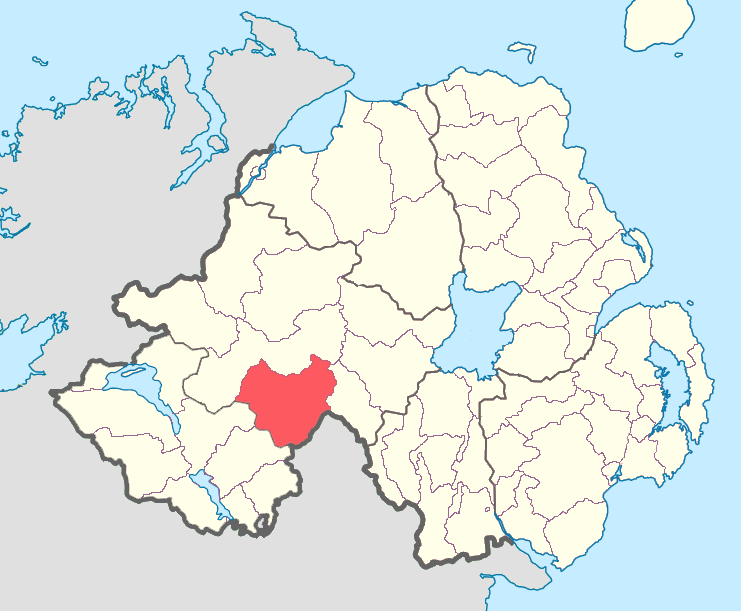
- Location of Clogher, County Tyrone, Northern Ireland.
- Sovereign state: United Kingdom
- Country: Northern Ireland
- County: Tyrone

Clogher is a barony in County Tyrone, Northern Ireland. It is bordered by four other baronies in Northern Ireland: Omagh East to the north; Dungannon Lower to the east; Magherastephana to the south; and Tirkennedy to the south-west. It also borders two baronies in the Republic of Ireland: Trough and Monaghan both to the south-east.

In the eighteenth century Clogher barony was sometimes called Upper Dungannon, by contrast with the then barony of Dungannon; it is not to be confused with the modern Dungannon Upper barony created by the 1837 subdivision of Dungannon barony.

== History ==
The Barony of Clogher is situated at the centre of the old Ui Cremthainn Kingdom of Clogher that was in existence in the 5th to 10th Centuries.

When the Cenél Fearadhaigh conquered the Clogher area from the Fir Manach (Fermanagh) Muintir Coeman around 1180AD, much of the area became known as Kinel Ferady, an anglicisation of a branch of the Cenél nEóghain, the Cenél Fearadhaigh, meaning kindred/descendants of Ferry. This territory was divided into two ancient districts.

The Mac Cathmhaoil (English: McCaul, Campbell, MacCawell, MacCall) were the leading sept of the Cenél Fearadhaigh, and one of the seven powerful septs supporting O'Neill. The Maolgeimridh (English: Mulgomery, Montgomery) and Maolpadraig (English: Mulpatrick, Kilpatrick) septs are recorded as being in possession of the two districts of the Cenél Fearadhaigh at one stage.

The Cenél Fearadhaigh by the 12th century controlled a large portion of County Tyrone and had penetrated deep into County Fermanagh. By the mid-13th century however, the power of the Cenél Fearadhaigh in Fermanagh was broken.

When the baronies of Ulster were being created by the English around 1585, the general manner was to name it after the principal town or castle lying within the area, in which they held their court, baron, and jail. This resulted in Kinel Ferady being renamed to Clogher.

== List of main settlements ==
- Augher
- Ballygawley
- Clogher
- Fintona
- Fivemiletown

== List of civil parishes ==
Below is a list of civil parishes in Clogher:

- Aghalurcher (split with barony of Magherastephana)
- Clogher
- Donacavey (split with barony of Omagh East)
- Errigal Keerogue
- Errigal Trough
