= Jeremy Henderson =

- Born: Jeremy John Christmas Henderson; 25 December 1952; Lisbellaw, County Fermanagh, NI
- Died: 28 April 2009 (aged 56); Boho, County Fermanagh, NI
- Resting place: Churchyard at Boho Parish Church, County Fermanagh, NI
- Education: Kingston University, Chelsea School of Art, London, England
- Known for: Painting
- Movement: Abstract, lyrical abstraction,
- Spouse: Patricia Martinelli

Jeremy Henderson was an Anglo-Irish artist and painter. Henderson was Artist in Residence at Kingston University, with art exhibited at the Royal Academy and National Art Collections.

== Life ==
Jeremy Henderson was born at Lisbellaw, County Fermanagh, on 25 December 1952, to James Douglas Alexander Henderson, who managed the family business of Henderson & Eadie, and Doris Josephine née Watson. He attended Portora Royal School in Enniskillen, where the art master, Angus Bryson, spotted Henderson as an exceptional student.

From 1972 to 1973 Henderson studied an Arts Foundation course at Ulster University. From 1973 to 1976 he studied Fine art at Kingston University, London, achieving a Bachelor of Arts first class honours degree under the tutelage of Terry Jones, returning in 1977 as Artist in Residence. In the same year he became the first recipient of the Stanley Picker Fellowship Award in Painting. Between 1978 and 1979 Henderson completed a MA postgraduate in Fine Art at Chelsea School of Art under the tutelage of the artist John Hoyland.

In 1980 Henderson started his professional artistic journey, developing abstract techniques, creating large canvases with complex layers of overlaid and inter-worked paint. Henderson lived and painted in London for 20 years before relocating back to Ireland. In the mid-1980s he worked in a studio adjacent to the house he shared with his partner, Jenni Stone with whom he had a daughter named Emerald.

In 1990 Henderson moved to the Cooperage Studio, Brick Lane, London, sharing the top floor with sculptor David Fusco and artist Bryan Benge, a friend from Kingston University. Benge says "Every Summer the studios in the East End became part of the open studios programme. . . . . He was an intelligent and incredibly accomplished Painter". It was here, separated from his partner and virtually penniless, he devoted himself entirely to his work, living in a tent, donated by Benge's parents, inside the studio .

Henderson was married once: in 1995 to the actress Patricia Martinelli with whom he subsequently had a daughter in 1997, Bella-Lucia. Henderson remained married, living in the remote village of Boho in Northern Ireland until his death, brought on by a brain tumour, on 28 April 2009. He remained a prolific artist throughout his life.

== Work ==
In 1975 Henderson exhibited for Stowells Trophy at the Royal Academy. Two years later, in 1977, Henderson became Artist in Residence at Kingston University.

During the mid-1980s Henderson's work became recognised by private and public collectors, including Bono, leader of the Irish rock band U2. During this period Henderson sold his first work to the National Art Collection (1986). 'Cuilcagh Under A Renaissance Sky' was purchased for Fermanagh County Museum with a grant from the Arts Council of Northern Ireland during his first solo exhibition "Around a Border" in Ireland. This was followed by 3 more acquisitions via the Arts Council during the 1980s, who have continued to support his work into the new millennium acquiring "If Hobbema had Seen Ireland" (1989) in 2004 via Art Fund with support from the Esmée Fairbairn Foundation. His work is exhibited by Arts Council England

Henderson began "Palinurus in Soho" in 1991, a series of 12 paintings depicting night time rooftop scenes across London, painted from an attic in Kingly Street. Exhibited at the Anna Bornholt Gallery in 1992, ten of the series were acquired by a single private collector. The other two are in a private collection in London, together with a number of Henderson’s other works.

Around 2000 Henderson became more influenced by Greek and Irish symbolism, in particular White Island, the Book of Kells and Sheela na gig, reflected in much of the art produced from this time onward. In 2001 Henderson created a set of enamel Manuscripts for the William Jefferson Clinton Centre in Enniskillen. Henderson was interested in enamelling because of the possibilities that it offered to him as a colourist and in the behaviour of gestural mark-making. The process was made possible when he was introduced to Andrew Morley, the authority on enamel sign making.

Henderson's work is held in the private collection of the entrepreneur Vincent Ferguson, owner of Fitzwilton Plc and Independent News & Media PLC. His work held in the Smurfit Art Collection of Smurfit Kappa Group.

Exhibitions & Awards for Henderson's work include; The Royal Academy, Stowells Trophy-1975, Institute of Contemporary Arts, London-New Contemporaries, Artscribe Prize-1978, Whitworth Gallery, Manchester, Northern Young Contemporaries, Semper Idem, Tandava Stasis-1979, Round House Gallery, London, A Sense of Ireland-1980, Fenderesky, Belfast-"Paintings Across a Border"[solo]-1986, Arts Council Gallery, Belfast-"Present Memories"-1987, Hendricks Gallery-Dublin-Present Memories-1987, Fenderesky, Belfast-"Landscape Now"-1987, Art Advice/Hendriks International Gallery-New York-"New Art from Ireland" & "Landscapes from Ireland"-1988, Atlantis Gallery, London-"Hill of History"-1994

== Description of Work ==
Henderson's painting style transitioned greatly from his early days favouring the mediums of Oil on Canvas; Oil on Paper; Watercolour; Gouache; Charcoal; Acrylic; Vitreous Enamel, using calligraphy in much of his work. His early vividly coloured geometric patterns were in the abstract contemporary style of the period. From the early 1980s his style developed into lyrical abstraction. Later with the transition to landscape scenes, typically of the Irish borders and coast, many layers of paint are used to build depth into each picture. In reference to these paintings Henderson says, "In my paintings the time of day is indeterminable, the weather changeable, something has happened or is about to happen".

In 1986 Ted Hickey, Keeper of Art at Ulster Museum wrote, "To state the obvious these landscapes are not careful delineations of picturesque landscape; they are essentially emotional and concerned with ideas about the nature of art and intended to stimulate and provoke rather than reassure". Liam Kelly critiques the 1987 Present Memories exhibition live of BBC Radio

In Henderson's 1989 work 'If Hobbema Had seen Ireland', exhibited at Fenderesky Gallery 1994 'Paintings Exhibition' and subsequently acquired via Art UK, the style is compared to that of Meindert Hobbema, as reflected in the title and reviewed by Fermanagh County Museum Curator in the Art UK 2004 Review.

Artistic influences include: Hans Hoffmann, Barnett Newman, Mark Rothko, and John Hoyland. Henderson, frequently associated with Samuel Beckett and Jack B Yeats was influenced by his homeland; his early environment, growing up around weaving, yarns and dyeing, the regions political turmoil, symbolism, and in later life his chronic illness, expressed in his more sombre paintings.

John Hutchinson, critic and director of the Douglas Hyde Gallery wrote in the Sunday Independent that Henderson's paintings, "'demonstrate the fruitfulness of the no man's land between abstraction and representation", and "His images deliberately evoke the picturesque and romantic landscape conventions that originated in the late 18th century.....as well as the expressionist subjectivity of painters such as Jack B Yeats". Due to Henderson's disinterest in the commercialisation of his work he is sometimes referred to as Ireland's Invisible Genius.

Henderson described the evolution of his work, after returning to Ireland in 1993, saying, "Since returning to Ireland my work has become less concerned with resting landscape painting in a cultural context more appropriate to our times, but has come full circle towards an internalised organic abstraction which characterised my more intuitive approach until the early eighties"

== Public Art ==
In 2001 Henderson was commissioned by the Arts Council of Northern Ireland to create a set of enamel Manuscripts for the William Jefferson Clinton Centre in Enniskillen, inaugurated by President Bill Clinton in 2002, in commemoration of the Remembrance Day bombings of 1987.
