= St Macartan's Cathedral =

St Macartan's Cathedral may refer to cathedral churches of the Diocese of Clogher in the following denominations:

Church of Ireland

- St Macartan's Cathedral, Clogher
- St Macartin's Cathedral, Enniskillen

Roman Catholic

- St Macartan's Cathedral, Monaghan
