= Diocese of Clogher =

The Diocese of Clogher is an ecclesiastical jurisdiction recognized by the Church of Ireland and Roman Catholic Church:

- Diocese of Clogher (Roman Catholic)
- Diocese of Clogher (Church of Ireland)

See also

- Bishop of Clogher, the pre-Reformation, Church of Ireland and Roman Catholic bishops
