= Charles Ovenden =

Irish Anglican priest and author (1846–1924)

- Born: Charles Thomas Ovenden; 11 September 1846; Enniskillen, County Fermanagh, Ireland
- Died: 9 July 1924 (aged 77); Earlscliffe, Baily, County Dublin, Ireland
- Religion: Christianity (Anglican)
- Church: Church of Ireland

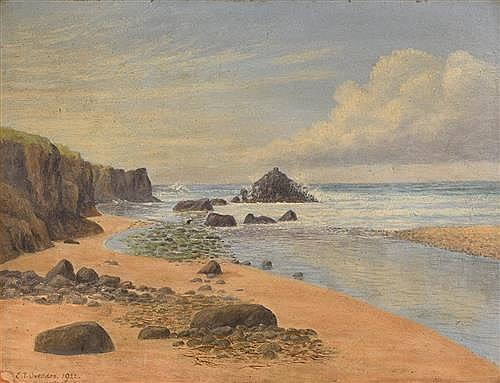
Seascape (1922) by Charles Ovenden

Charles Thomas Ovenden (11 September 1846 – 9 July 1924) was an Irish Anglican priest, author, and Dean of St. Patrick's Cathedral, Dublin of the Church of Ireland.

== Early life and education ==
Born in Enniskillen, Northern Ireland he was educated at the Portora Royal School, Enniskillen and Trinity College, Dublin.

== Career ==
Ordained in 1870, his first position was as a curate at Magdalene Church, Belfast. Later he was Rector of Dunluce, County Antrim and then Succentor at St Patrick's Cathedral, Dublin. He was Rector of Portrush from 1884 to 1886 when he became Precentor of Clogher. In 1903 he became Dean of Clogher before moving to Dublin in 1911.

During World War I he protested the German submarine actions and while the Dean of St. Patrick's Church was quoted by The Telegraph as saying that he prays with all heart "that [the German] knavish tricks might be confounded".

== Personal life ==
He married Isabella Mary Ovenden (née Robinson) in 1871. Their daughters were paediatrician Isabella (‘Ella’) Gertrude Amy Webb (16 October 1877–1946) and Florence Irene Harriet Wynne-Finch (née Ovenden). They raised Charles Ovenden's niece, confusingly also named Isabella Gertrude Webb but born 28 October 1877. The later child's parents, William Henry (Charles' brother) and Edith Ovenden née Lamb, fought contentious divorce and custody proceedings in New Zealand, as a result of which a judge placed Webb's cousin in the custody of Charles and Isabella in Ireland.

Church of Ireland titles
Preceded by George Tottenham	Dean of Clogher; 1903–1911	Succeeded by Arthur Newburgh Haire-Forster
Preceded by John Henry Bernard	Dean of St Patrick's Cathedral, Dublin; 1911–1924	Succeeded by Hugh Jackson Lawlor
