= John Hodson (bishop) =

Anglican bishop

John Hodson, D.D. was an Anglican bishop.

He held livings at Louth, Drogheda, Beaulieu, Donagh and Errigal-Trough. He was Dean of Clogher from 1661 to 1667; and Bishop of Elphin from then until his death on 18 February 1686.

Church of Ireland titles
Preceded by Robert Berkeley	Dean of Clogher; 1661–1667	Succeeded by John Roane
Preceded by John Parker	Bishop of Elphin; 1667–1686	Succeeded by Simon Digby
