= County Fermanagh War Memorial =

World Wars memorial, Enniskillen, Northern Ireland

- United Kingdom
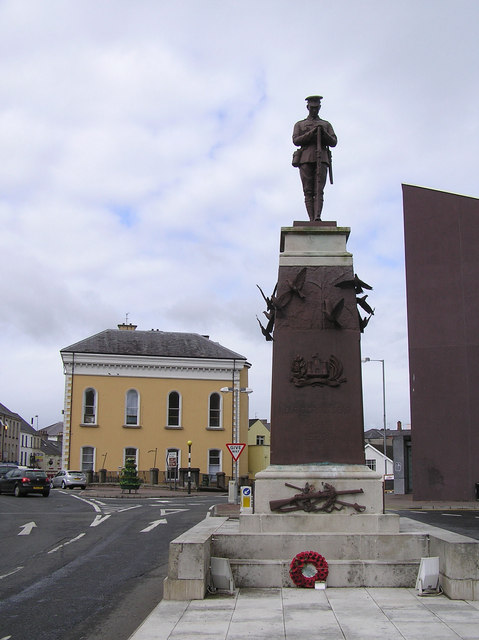
- Front of the war memorial. At the back left is the Orange Hall and at right the Clinton Centre.
- For British military dead of the First and Second World Wars. Also those civilians killed in the 1987 IRA bombing at this site.
- Unveiled: 24 October 1922
- Location: 54°20′40″N 7°38′03″W; Enniskillen, County Fermanagh, Northern Ireland
- "Our Glorious Dead"

The County Fermanagh War Memorial (also known as the Enniskillen War Memorial) stands in Enniskillen, County Fermanagh, Northern Ireland. It was originally constructed to commemorate the men of the town killed during the First World War, particularly those serving with the local regiments, the 6th (Inniskilling) Dragoons and the Royal Inniskilling Fusiliers. It was later altered to also commemorate those killed in the Second World War.

The memorial was the site of an IRA bombing on 8 November 1987, during a Remembrance Sunday ceremony. Photographs of the war memorial in the aftermath became emblematic of this stage of The Troubles and the site was visited shortly afterwards by British prime minister Margaret Thatcher for a rescheduled remembrance ceremony. The memorial was renovated in 1990-91 and a new section added to commemorate those killed in the bombing. The memorial has been visited by the Irish Taoiseach on Remembrance Sunday each year since 2012.

== Original memorial ==
The County Fermanagh War Memorial Committee was formed after the First World War and in 1920 sought designs for a war memorial by a notification posted in the Architect and Building News. The estimated cost was stated to be £1,500 and the deadline for entries was 20 November. A winning design had been chosen by early 1921.

The memorial was built by Gaffin & Co., whose showroom, the Carrara Marble and Granite Works, was at 63 Regent Street in London. The main figure is of a British First World War soldier, in peaked cap with a rifle, resting on arms reversed. This was cast in bronze from a sculpture by a Northern Irish artist. The artist could not find a suitable photograph to work from so based the soldier on a painting by William Gibbes Mackenzie displayed at Belfast City Hall, which shows Thomas McNeilly of the Royal Irish Rifles standing at the temporary cenotaph erected in Belfast for the city's Peace Day commemoration on 9 August 1919.

The sculpture stood on a limestone plinth is engraved with the phrase "OUR GLORIOUS DEAD" and the years "1914-1918". The plinth also showed the names, ranks, decorations and regiments of 612 local men killed in the war and a coat of arms featuring Enniskillen Castle, which is associated with the local 6th (Inniskilling) Dragoons and Royal Inniskilling Fusiliers regiments. The stepped base has a bronze depiction of a crossed sword and rifle, reflecting the roles of the two regiments (cavalry and infantry). The monument was unveiled by the last Lord Lieutenant of Ireland Edmund FitzAlan-Howard, 1st Viscount FitzAlan of Derwent on 24 October 1922. At the unveiling wreaths were laid by Catholic and Protestant war orphans and an honour guard was provided by the Royal Inniskilling Fusiliers, the Lincolnshire Regiment and the Royal Horse Artillery. Four senior non-commissioned officers from the Fusiliers stood guard at each corner of the memorial during the unveiling ceremony.

Following the Second World War the dates "1939-1945" and the names of the dead from that war (including those who served with the Merchant Navy) added to the plinth.

== 1987 bombing ==
Standing at the war memorial, children hand in hand,
Another year is over - perhaps we understand,
That words of love are stronger than the words of hate.
Let us not forget what happened on Remembrance Day.
What ever you believe in, what ever flag you wave,
Let us not forget what happened on Remembrance Day

— From the last verse of "At the War Memorial" by Chris de Burgh

World War I memorials in Ireland had been targeted by Republicans before and during The Troubles, being seen as symbols of the British Army. The Provisional Irish Republican Army (IRA) carried out a bombing at the County Fermanagh War Memorial during a Remembrance Sunday ceremony on 8 November 1987. This killed 11 civilians attending the ceremony and injured 63 others, one of those injured never regained consciousness and died of his injuries in December 2000. The war memorial was damaged by flying debris, which pockmarked the plinth.

The war memorial immediately became a symbol of this period of The Troubles. A photograph of the memorial and the bomb-damaged St Michael's Hall community centre was featured on the front page of the Irish Times the day after the bombing. Similar photographs featured in the newspaper over the following two days. The death toll from this bombing, and news of a second, larger bomb planned to explode the same day at a ceremony in Tullyhommon, shocked many people and led to a loss of support for the IRA in the Republic of Ireland.

In response to the bombing the British prime minister Margaret Thatcher attended a rescheduled remembrance ceremony at the war memorial on 22 November. The bombing had the effect of increasing attendance at remembrance ceremonies across Ireland and led to the Royal British Legion resuming sales of remembrance poppies in the Republic of Ireland. The British-Irish singer Chris de Burgh's song "At the War Memorial" was written in response to the attack.

== 1990-91 renovation and recent history ==
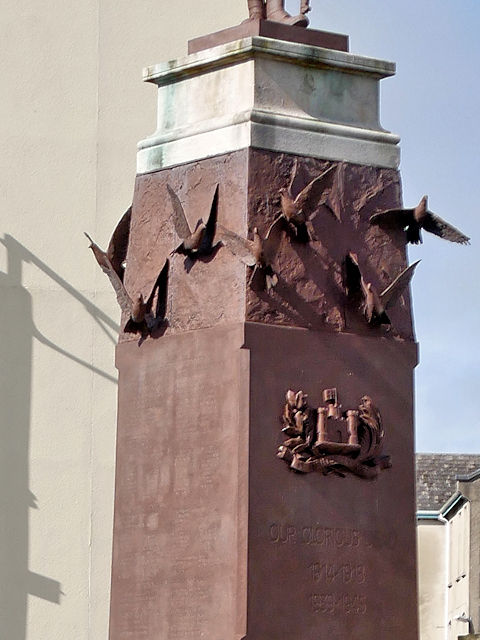
Detail of the additional section of plinth added to commemorate victims of the 1987 IRA bombing

The County Fermanagh War Memorial was renovated in 1990-91 by Phillip Flanagan and Richard Pierce. The world war engravings were recut and a new section, 1 metre (3.3 ft) high, added to the plinth. The additional section contains depictions of 11 doves (each a unique sculpt) to commemorate those killed in the 1987 bombing and their names were also added to the memorial. The central section of the plinth was also painted dark red around this time (photographs from 1987 show it as natural stone). After the renovation, the memorial stands 6 metres (20 ft) high and approximately 4 metres (13 ft) square in plan.

In 2012 the Irish Taoiseach Enda Kenny visited the memorial on Remembrance Sunday to lay a green laurel wreath on behalf of the Irish government. This marked the start of an annual tradition that was continued by his successor, Leo Varadkar.

A separate memorial to the 12 people whose deaths were caused by the 1987 bombing was unveiled on 8 November 2017 (the 30th anniversary of the event). it was initially sited on land owned by the Catholic Church's St Michael's Diocesan Trust but was removed within hours as the church had not granted its permission. In 2019 it was announced that the memorial would be installed at The Clinton Centre, which stands on the site of a building destroyed by the bombing. There are plans to carry out works to visually connect the new memorial with the existing war memorial.

== Gallery ==
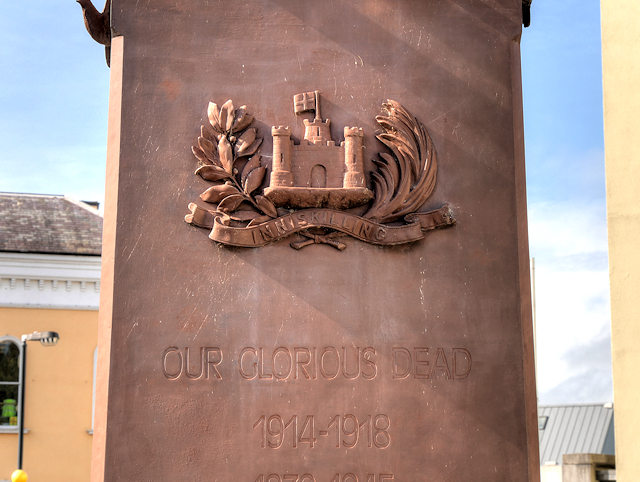
Detail of the main inscription and coat of arms

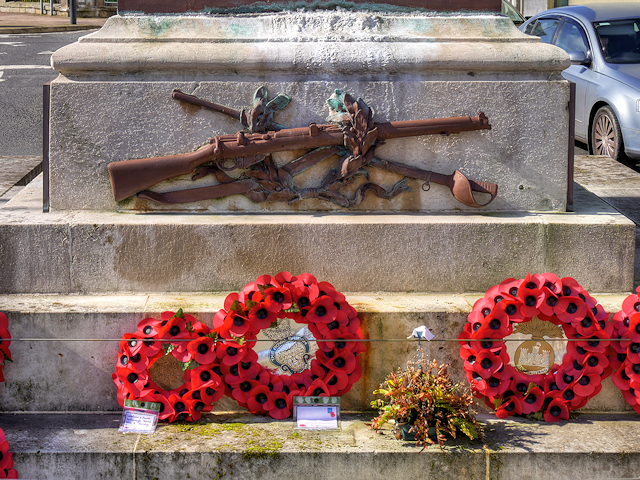
Detail of crossed rifle and sword at the base of the plinth

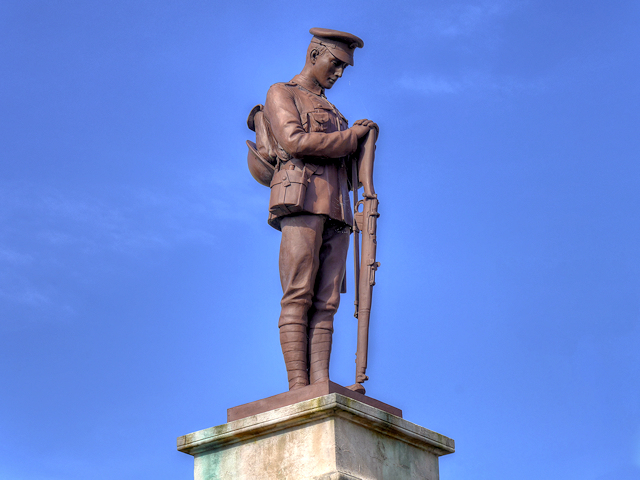
Detail of the sculpture atop the plinth

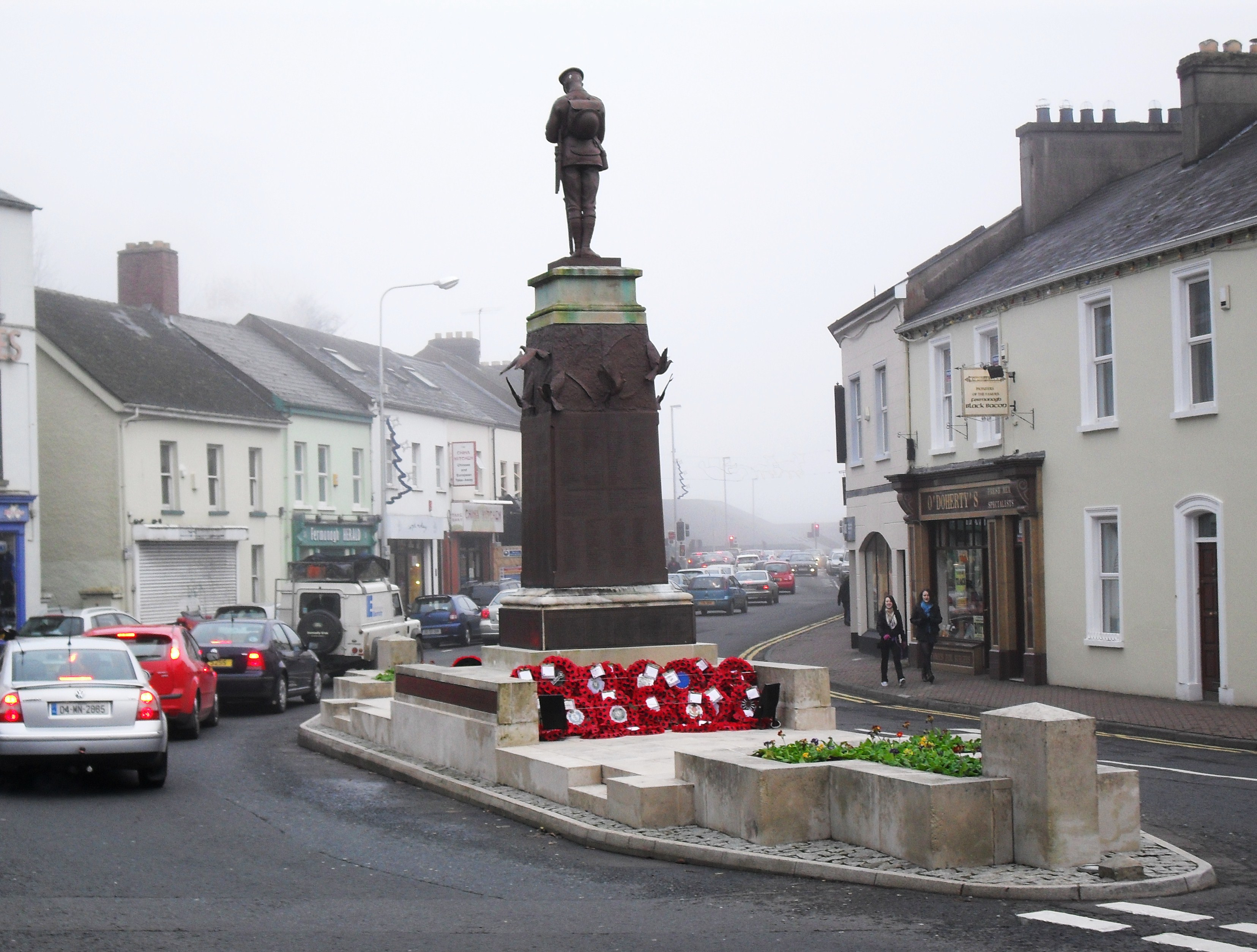
The rear of the memorial
