= Royal Inniskilling Fusiliers =

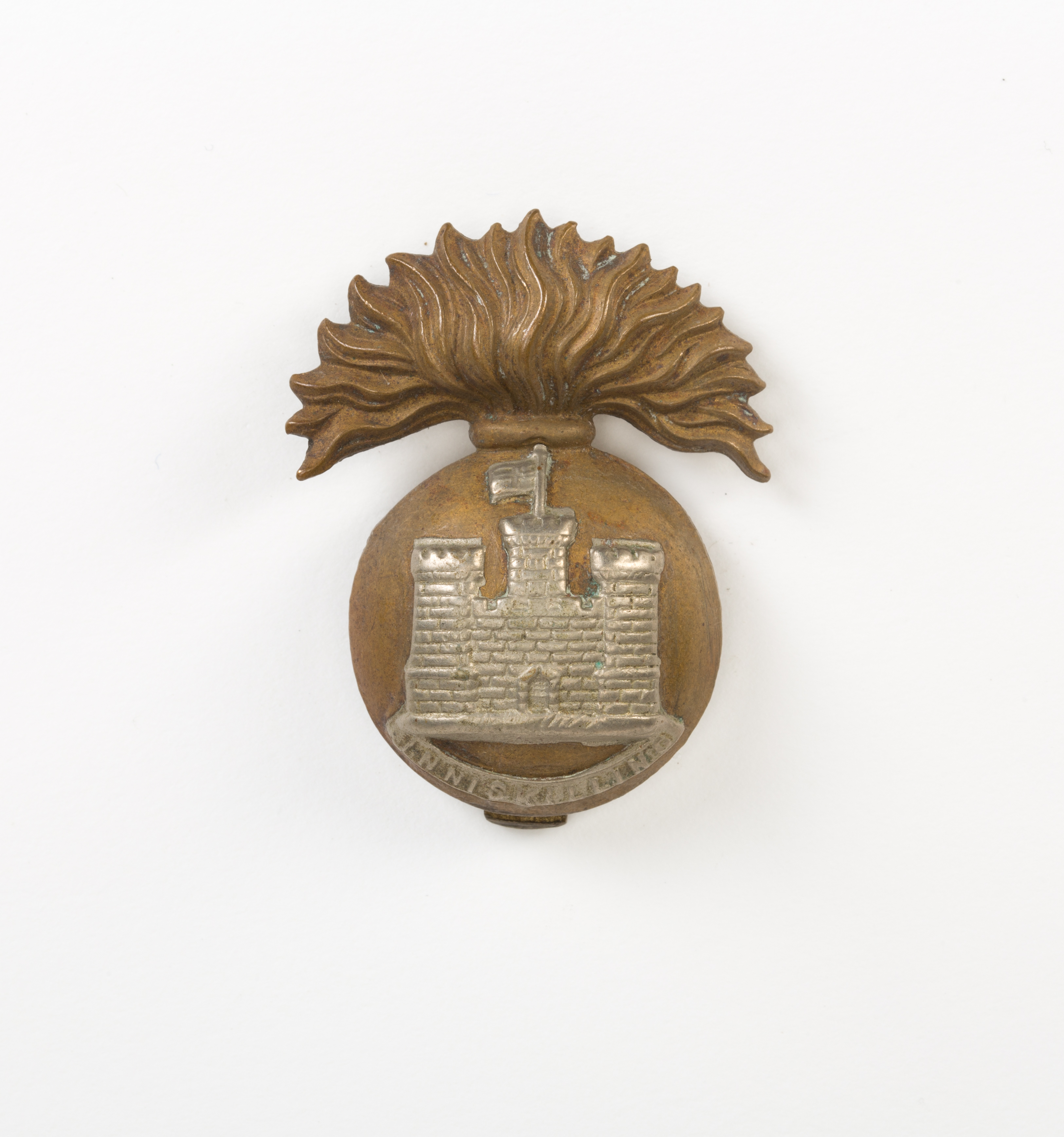
- Regimental cap badge between 1881 and 1916
- Active: 1881–1968
- Country: United Kingdom
- Branch: British Army
- Type: Infantry
- Role: Line infantry
- Size: 1 Regular battalion at amalgamation (10 during the Great War)
- Garrison/HQ: St Lucia Barracks, Omagh
- Nickname: The Skins
- Motto: Nec Aspera Terrant (By difficulties undaunted) (Latin)
- Colors: Blue facings
- March: Quick – The Sprig of Shillelagh & Rory O'More; Slow – Eileen Alannah
- Anniversaries: Waterloo Day, 18 June; Somme Day, 1 July
- Engagements: Badajoz, Waterloo, Gallipoli, Burma

Commanders
- Colonel of the Regiment: Prince Henry, Duke of Gloucester

Insignia
- Hackle: Grey
- Tartan: Saffron (pipes)

The Royal Inniskilling Fusiliers was an Irish line infantry regiment of the British Army in existence from 1881 until 1968. The regiment was formed in 1881 by the amalgamation of the 27th (Inniskilling) Regiment of Foot and the 108th Regiment of Foot.

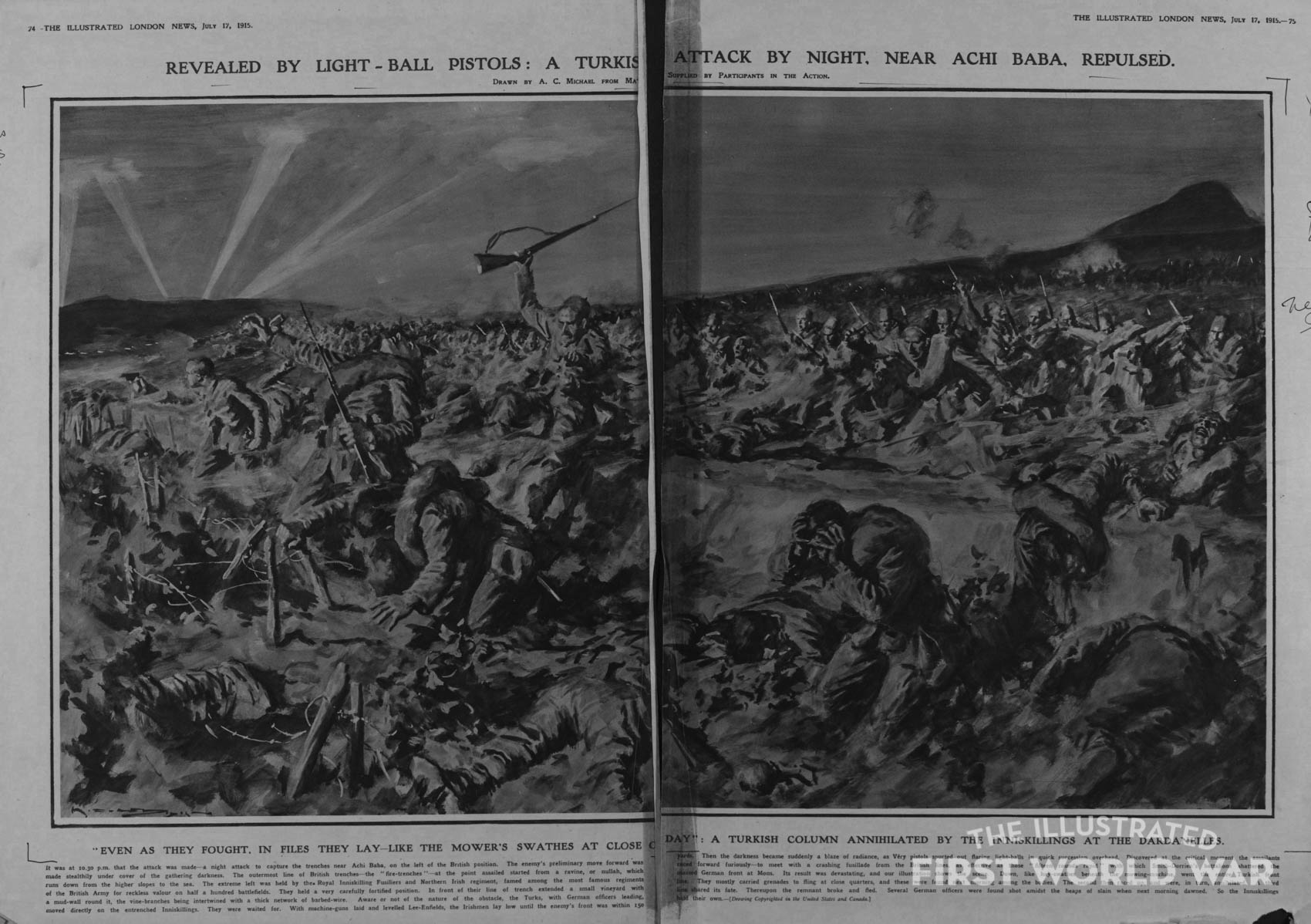
Arthur Cadwgan Michael illustration of a flare lighting up an Ottoman attack on Royal Inniskilling Fusiliers' positions near Achi Baba, Gallipoli

It saw service in the Second Boer War, the First World War and the Second World War. In 1968 it was amalgamated with the other regiments in the North Irish Brigade, the Royal Ulster Rifles, and the Royal Irish Fusiliers (Princess Victoria's) into the Royal Irish Rangers.

== History ==
=== 1881 – 1914 ===
On 1 July 1881 the 27th (Inniskilling) Regiment of Foot and the 108th Regiment of Foot were redesignated as the 1st and 2nd Battalions, The Royal Inniskilling Fusiliers, respectively. In 1903 the Regiment was granted a grey hackle for their fusilier raccoon-skin hats to commemorate the original grey uniforms of the Inniskilling Regiment.

The regimental district comprised the city of Derry and the counties of Donegal, Londonderry, Tyrone and Fermanagh in Ireland, with its garrison depot located at St Lucia Barracks in Omagh. The local militia regiments also became part of the new regiment:

- Fermanagh Light Infantry Militia – became 3rd Battalion
- Londonderry Light Infantry – became 4th Battalion, then converted to artillery
- Royal Tyrone Fusiliers – became 5th, then 4th Battalion
- Prince of Wales's Own Donegal Militia – became 6th, then 5th Battalion

Militarily, the whole of Ireland was administered as a separate command within the United Kingdom with Command Headquarters at Parkgate (Phoenix Park) Dublin, directly under the War Office in London.

Under the Childers system, one regular battalion of each regiment was to be at a "home" station, while the other was abroad. Every few years, there was to be an exchange of battalions. In the period from the regiment's formation to the outbreak of the Second Boer War, the two regular battalions were stationed as follows:

Location of 1st Battalion (ex 27th Foot)	Years	Location of 2nd Battalion (ex 108th Foot)	Years
Hong Kong	1881–1883	England	1881–1882
Straits Settlements and Singapore	1883–1886	Ireland	1882–1886
South Africa	1886–1889	England	1886–1888
England	1889–1893	India and Burma (fought in Tirah Campaign of 1897)	1888–1899
Ireland	1893–1899	India and Burma (fought in Tirah Campaign of 1897)	1888–1899

==== Second Boer War ====
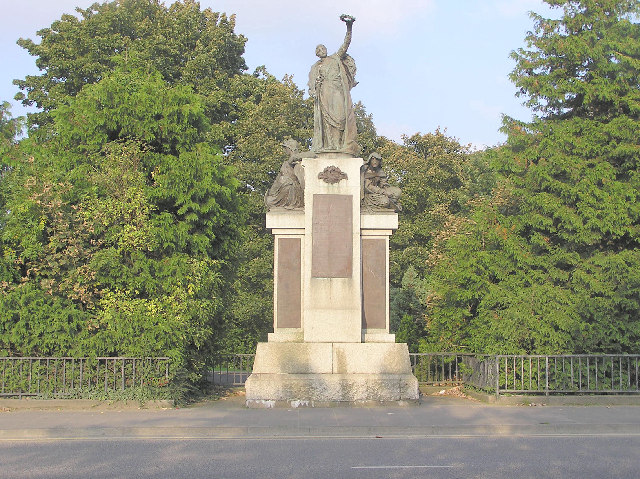
Boer War memorial to the men of the Inniskilling Fusiliers in Omagh

In October 1899 war broke out between the United Kingdom and the Boer Republics in what is now South Africa. The 1st Battalion landed at Durban, where they became part of the 5th (Irish) Brigade. The battalion was involved in a series of military reverses at the hands of the Boers, which became known as the "Black Week", culminating in defeat at the Battle of Colenso.

The unit subsequently took part in the Tugela Campaign before helping relieve Ladysmith in early 1900. The regiment lent its name to "Inniskilling Hill", which was taken by the 5th brigade on 24/25 February 1900. The war ended with the Treaty of Vereeniging in June 1902, and the 1st Battalion stayed in South Africa until January 1903, when 434 officers and men left Cape Town for home.

The 2nd Battalion arrived in South Africa from India only in the late stages of the war and saw little action.

Following the war in South Africa, the system of rotating battalions between home and foreign stations resumed as follows:

Location of 1st Battalion (ex 27th Foot)	Years	Location of 2nd Battalion (ex 108th Foot)	Years
Ireland	1902–1907	Egypt	1902–1908
Crete and Malta	1907–1911	Ireland	1908–1910
China	1911–1913	England	1910–1914
India	1913–1915	England	1910–1914

In 1908, the Volunteers and Militia were reorganised nationally, with the former becoming the Territorial Force and the latter the Special Reserve. There were no Territorial units in Ireland; the three militia battalions were reorganised with the 4th (Royal Tyrone Militia) becoming the 3rd (Reserve) Bn, the 3rd (Fermanagh Militia) becoming the 4th (Extra Reserve) Bn, and the 5th (Donegal Militia) being disbanded.

=== First World War ===
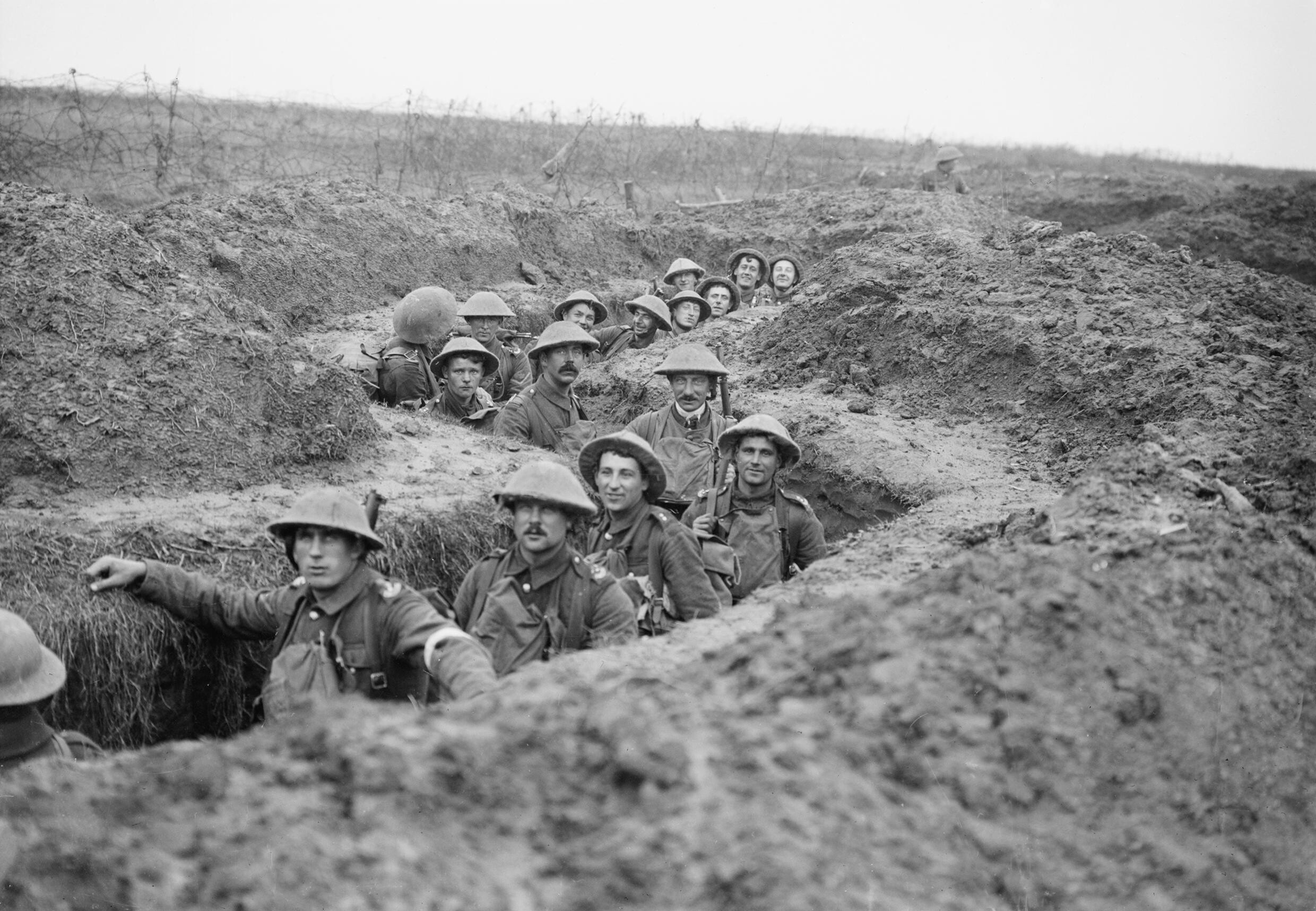
Soldiers of the Royal Inniskilling Fusiliers at the Battle of Cambrai in November 1917

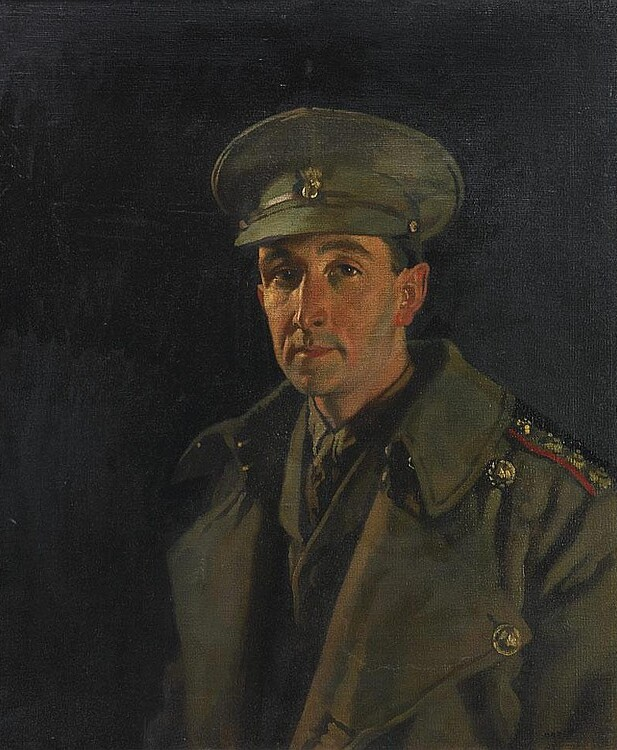
Portrait of Captain Wood of Royal Inniskilling Fusiliers painted by Sir William Orpen in 1919

==== Regular Army ====
The 1st Battalion, which had been serving in India, returned home in January 1915. It was landed at Cape Helles on the Gallipoli peninsula as part of the 87th Brigade in the 29th Division in April 1915. It was evacuated from Gallipoli to Egypt in January 1916 and then landed at Marseille in March 1916 for service on the Western Front.

The 2nd Battalion landed at Le Havre as part of the 12th Brigade in the 4th Division in August 1914 for service on the Western Front and was heavily involved at the Battle of Le Cateau in August 1914.

==== Special Reserve ====
The 3rd and 4th Battalions fulfilled their role of training reinforcement drafts for the 1st and 2nd Bns. Both were stationed in Northern Ireland until April 1918 when they moved to Oswestry in the Welsh Borders and were amalgamated, at the same time absorbing the 12th (Reserve) Bn (originally formed from the depot companies of the 9th, 10th and 11th Bns).

==== New Armies ====
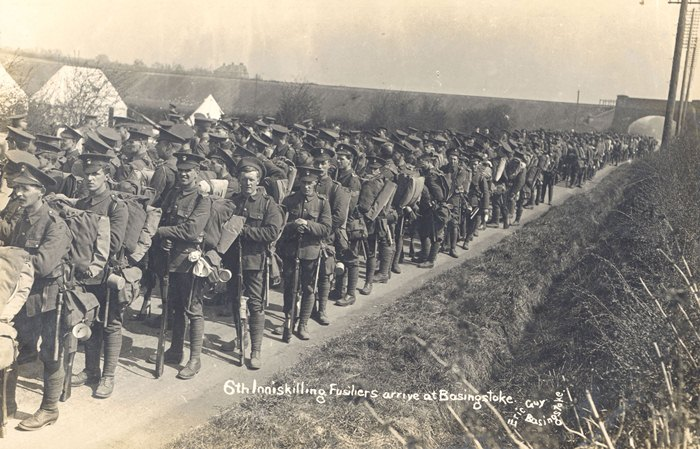
Men of the 6th (Service) Battalion, Royal Inniskilling Fusiliers, at Basingstoke, Hampshire, 1915.

The 5th (Service) Battalion and 6th (Service) Battalion landed at Suvla Bay at Gallipoli as part of the 31st Brigade in the 10th (Irish) Division in August 1915, but it was moved to Salonika in September 1915 for service on the Macedonian front. It was moved to France in May 1918 for service on the Western Front.

The 7th (Service) Battalion and 8th (Service) Battalion landed in France as part of the 49th Brigade in the 16th (Irish) Division in February 1916 for service on the Western Front.

The 9th (Service) Battalion (County Tyrone), the 10th (Service) Battalion (Derry), and the 11th (Service) Battalion (Donegal and Fermanagh) landed in France as part of the 109th Brigade in the 36th (Ulster) Division in October 1915 for service on the Western Front.

During the 1916 Easter Rising in Dublin, the 12th (Reserve) Battalion fought against rebels of the Irish Citizen Army. Two soldiers of the battalion were killed and seven were wounded. The 13th (Garrison) Battalion was formed in France in June 1918 from No 7 Garrison Guard Battalion, composed of 'B1' medical category men. After rigorous training it dropped the 'Garrison' designation in July, and then served as a frontline battalion in 40th Division during the final advance to victory.

=== Inter War ===
After the war, the Childers system was resumed, with the 1st Battalion moving to India for foreign service, and the 2nd Battalion based on Salisbury Plain for home service. With the independence of the Irish Free State in 1922, all the Irish line infantry regiments of the British army regiments were to be disbanded. However, this decision was later amended to exclude four battalions. After a successful campaign by the Royal Irish Fusiliers (Princess Victoria's), the Army agreed that the disbandment would not be of the most junior regiment but of the two most junior battalions. These were the 2nd Battalion, Royal Irish Fusiliers, the old 89th Foot, and the 2nd Battalion, Inniskillings, the old 108th Foot.

The Inniskillings moved from India to Iraq in 1922, returning to Shorncliffe, England in 1925. They were stationed in Northern Ireland from 1927 to 1933, before moving to Aldershot. They resumed foreign service in 1934, moving to Shanghai and then Singapore two years later.

In 1937 there was an expansion of the army, and the 2nd Battalion was re-raised at Omagh, moving to Catterick in the following year. The 2nd Battalion of the Royal Irish Fusiliers was also reformed, and the arrangement of 1922 ended. The 1st Inniskillings moved to Wellington, Madras in 1938. The two battalions were in these locations when the Second World War broke out in 1939.

=== Second World War ===
In addition to the 1st and 2nd Battalions, both part of the Regular Army, the regiment raised three other battalions (5th, 6th and 70th) to fight in the Second World War.

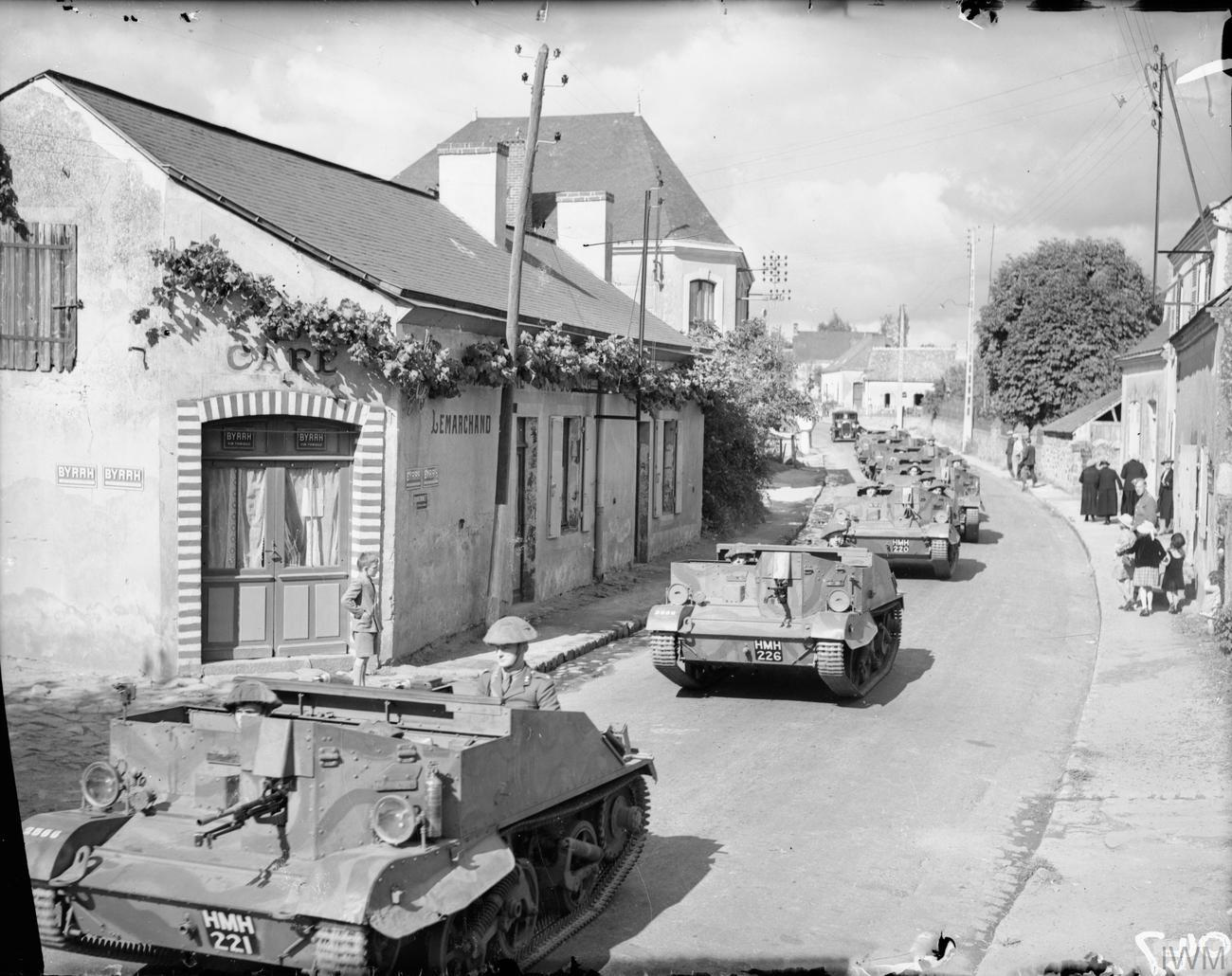
Men of the 2nd Battalion, Royal Inniskilling Fusiliers in France, September 1939.

The 1st Battalion was a Regular Army unit stationed in British India on the outbreak of war. It spent the entire war there, fighting in the early stages of the Burma campaign. In 1942 the battalion was flown to Burma to help stem the Japanese advance, and in 1943 took part in the operations in the Arakan peninsular with the 48th Indian Infantry Brigade, part of the 14th Indian Infantry Division.

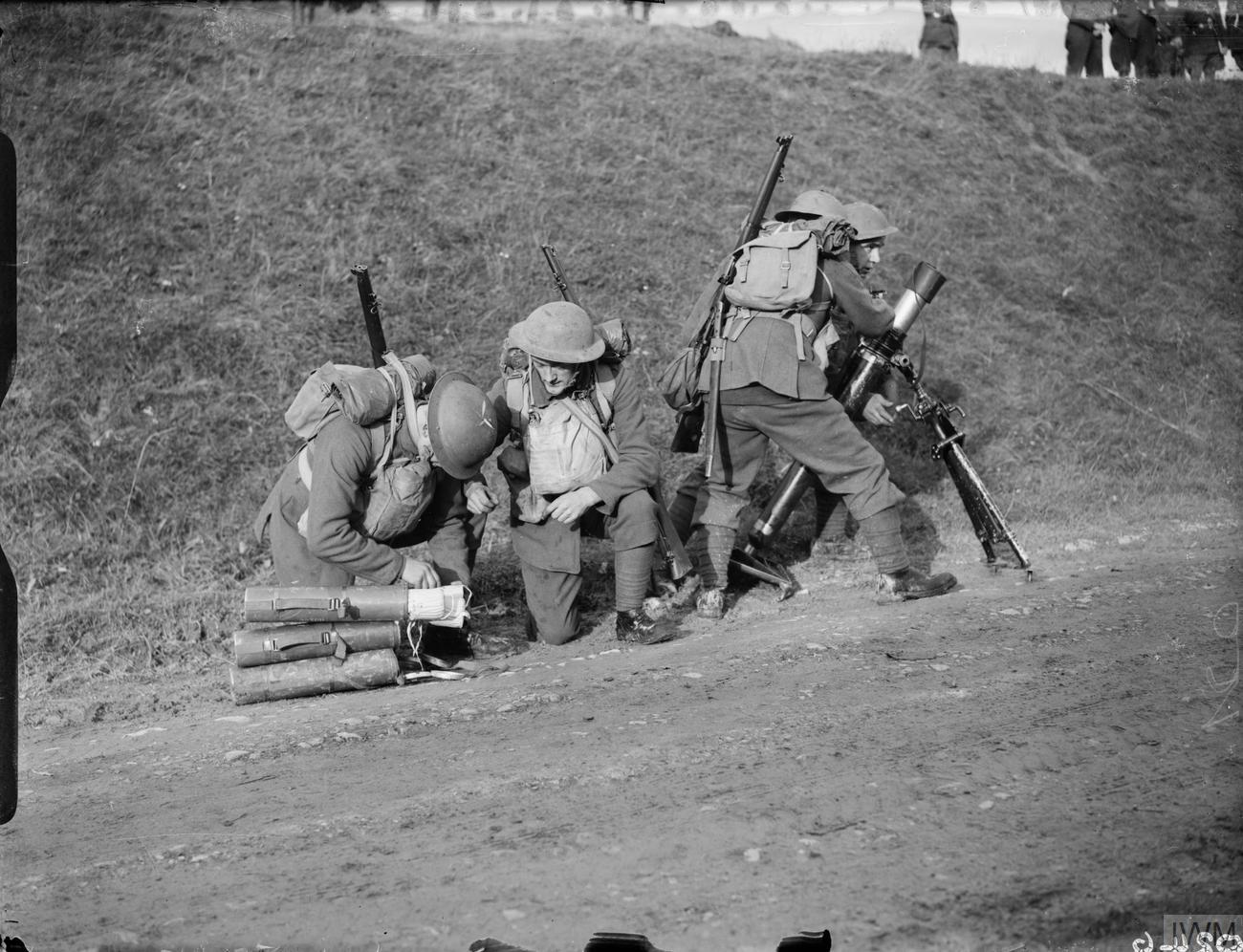
A 3-inch mortar of 2nd Royal Inniskilling Fusiliers being demonstrated, 4 November 1939.

The 2nd Battalion, a Regular Army unit, was serving in the 13th Infantry Brigade, alongside 2nd Wiltshire Regiment and 2nd Cameronians (Scottish Rifles), part of 5th Infantry Division. It was sent to France in late 1939 after war was declared. The battalion, as part of the BEF, was among those that were evacuated from Dunkirk after desperate fighting as the rearguard to the retreating BEF. The battalion was reduced to 215 persons, all ranks.

After re-fitting, the 2nd Battalion, with the rest of 5th Division, left England in 1942 for the East Indies. They traveled to Madagascar, where they fought the Vichy French in a brief campaign in Madagascar to ensure that the Japanese did not occupy the island to interdict Allied shipping. They continued to British India, Persia and Syria. They deployed for Operation Husky, the invasion of Sicily, followed by that of Italy, now serving with the British Eighth Army in both.

In July 1944, while resting in Palestine after seeing severe fighting at Anzio, the 2nd Battalion absorbed many personnel of the 6th Battalion and transferred to 38th (Irish) Infantry Brigade, of the 78th Battleaxe Infantry Division. It remained with this formation for the rest of the war. With absorbing the men of the 6th Battalion, the 2nd Battalion was at a new War Establishment strength of 43 officers and 900 other ranks. The battalion would see service in the battles around the Gothic Line in August–September 1944, and later in the final offensive in Italy in April 1945.

The 5th Battalion was a hostilities-only unit raised in 1940. It never served overseas and remained in the United Kingdom for the war. It served as a home defence formation assigned to the 144th Brigade in the 48th (South Midland) Infantry Division, and briefly to the 199th (Manchester) Brigade in the 55th (West Lancashire) Infantry Division. In 1944, the battalion became a training formation. It was also tasked with providing drafts for overseas fighting formations. In this capacity, it was assigned to the 45th Infantry Brigade and was initially part of the 80th Infantry (Reserve) Division and later part of the 38th Infantry (Reserve) Division.

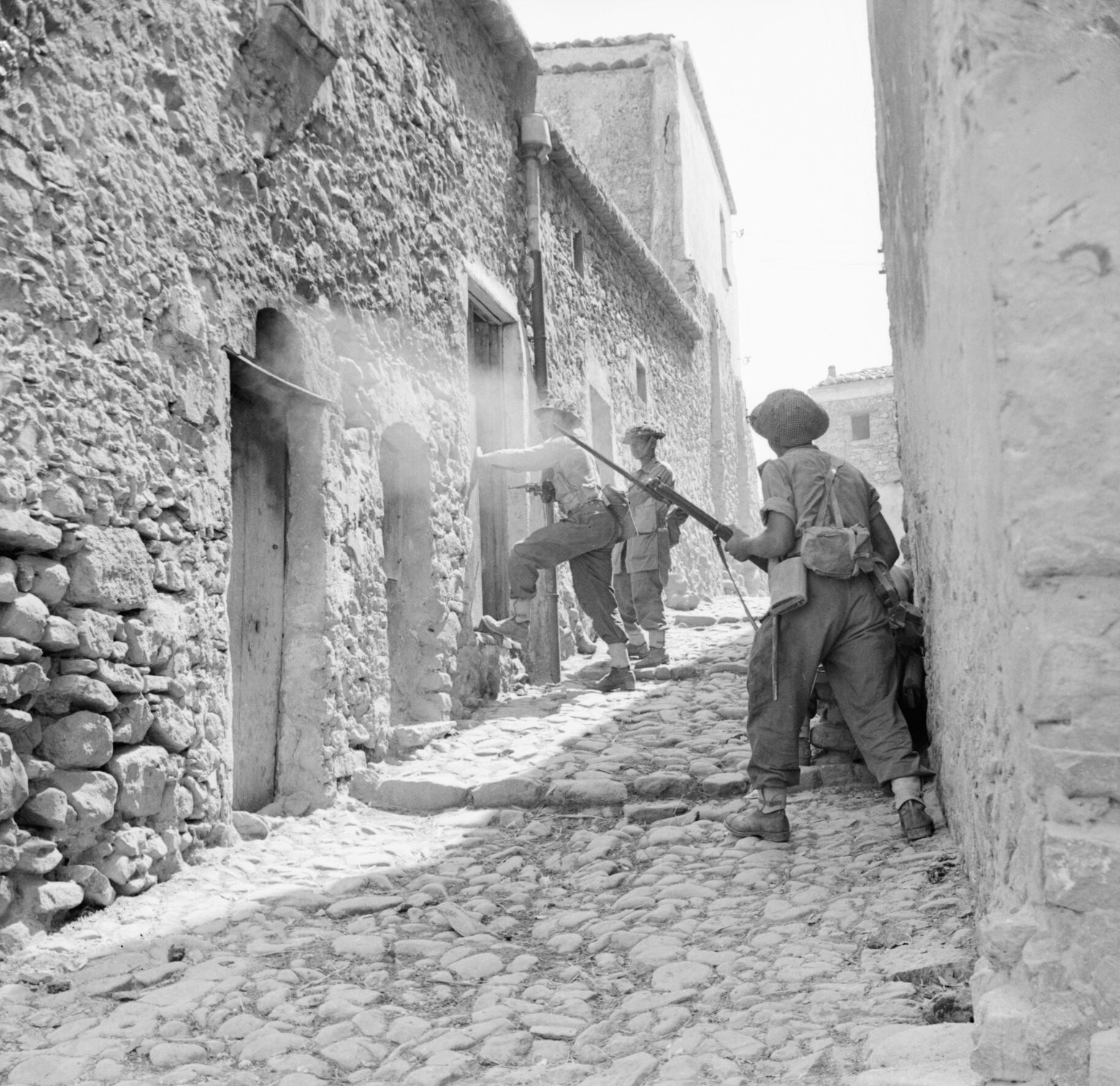
Men of the 6th Inniskillings clearing houses during the Battle of Centuripe, during the Allied invasion of Sicily, August 1943.

The 6th Battalion was a war-service battalion created in October 1940. In early 1942 the battalion was assigned to the 210th Independent Infantry Brigade (Home), serving alongside 1st Battalion, Royal Irish Fusiliers and 2nd Battalion, London Irish Rifles. The brigade was under command of Brigadier The O'Donovan and was later redesignated 38th (Irish) Infantry Brigade, which was part of the 6th Armoured Division. During the fighting in Italy, the 6th Battalion would serve in the same theatre as the 2nd Battalion. The 6th Battalion fought in the Tunisian Campaign in North Africa in 1942–1943 with the rest of the 6th Armoured Division, part of the British First Army, and the 2nd Battalion took part in the landings in Sicily and then Italy.

In February 1943 the 6th Skins, Irish Brigade included, was exchanged for 1st Guards Brigade and joined the 78th Battleaxe Division, considered to be one of the best divisions of the British Army during the Second World War. It remained with them until disbandment in 1944. The 6th Battalion fought in Sicily and Italy, most notably at Centuripe in Sicily, where its unexpected assault on the hilltop town took the Germans by surprise and earned the 78th Division great praise in their first battle with the British Eighth Army. In Italy the battalion fought at the terrible Battle of Monte Cassino and in the pursuit north of Rome, but it was disbanded after the battles at Lake Trasimene in June 1944 due to a shortage of manpower. Its place in the Irish Brigade was taken by the 2nd Inniskillings, from the 5th Infantry Division, which absorbed many of the personnel of 6th Inniskillings, with the rest of the men going elsewhere in the Irish Brigade.

The 70th (Young Soldiers) Battalion was raised during the war for those young soldiers who had volunteered and had not yet reached the age to be conscripted. The battalion never saw active service abroad. It was disbanded in 1943, due to the British government lowering the age of consent for conscription.

=== Post War ===
After the war, the 1st Battalion returned to India from Burma. After a stay in Hong Kong, the regiment fought in the Malayan Emergency against pro-independence and communist guerrillas known as the Malayan National Liberation Army. In 1948 both regular battalions were amalgamated as the 1st Battalion, the Royal Inniskilling Fusiliers. In 1949, after a brief spell at home, the battalion went to the West Indies. It returned to the United Kingdom in April 1951. In 1952 it was presented with the Freedom of Enniskillen, the town of its founding. Later that year it went abroad to the Suez Canal Zone and afterwards to Kenya, where it helped to suppress the Mau Mau Uprising. In the latter country, it received the Freedom of Nairobi in perpetuity, the first and so far only time that a British regiment has been so honoured by a colonial city. For a short time, from April 1952, the 2nd Battalion was reformed and saw service in Egypt and Cyprus, where it was in action against EOKA insurgents.

The 1st Battalion returned to England in 1955. After two years at the School of Infantry, it went to Germany, being stationed in Berlin and Wuppertal. In 1960 half of the battalion was back in Kenya with a detachment in Bahrain. In 1961 the battalion flew into Kuwait when the sheikdom was threatened by Iraq. The battalion returned to England in 1962, stationed at Gravesend.

In April 1968 the 1st Battalion had its final operational deployment, when Tactical Headquarters and B Company were ordered at short notice to Bermuda to reinforce the Bermuda Regiment in aiding the Bermuda Police Force, with trouble brewing on the island due to a tense political situation. Following a peaceful election, the detachment returned to Worcester in preparation, with the remainder of the battalion, for the final regimental chapter. At midnight on 30 June 1968, following a nostalgic ceremony, the regimental flag was lowered for the last time.

=== Amalgamation ===
On 1 July 1968, the Royal Inniskilling Fusiliers, the Royal Ulster Rifles and the Royal Irish Fusiliers became the Royal Irish Rangers (27th Inniskilling, 83rd and 87th). The date of 1 July was chosen as it marked the fifty-second anniversary of the first day of the Battle of the Somme, in which battalions of all three merging regiments fought.

== Regimental museum ==
The Inniskillings Museum (for the Royal Inniskilling Fusiliers and the 5th Royal Inniskilling Dragoon Guards) is based at Enniskillen Castle

== Battle honours ==
Borne on the Regimental Colours (including the combined honours of the 27th and 108th Foot):

- Martinique 1762 ¶
- Havannah ¶
- St Lucia 1778–96 ¶
- Maida †
- Busaco †
- Badajoz †
- Salamanca †
- Vitoria †
- Pyrenees †
- Nivelle †
- Orthes †
- Toulouse
- Peninsula †
- Waterloo †
- South Africa 1835, 1846–47♦
- Central India ‡
- Relief of Ladysmith
- South Africa 1899–1902

† Awarded to 27th Foot
‡ Awarded to 108th Foot
¶ Awarded in 1909 for services of the 27th Foot
♦ Awarded in 1882 for services of 27th Foot

Borne on the Queen's Colour (10 selected honours each for the First and Second World Wars):

- Le Cateau
- Somme 1916, '18
- Ypres, 1917, '18
- St Quentin
- Hindenburg Line
- France & Flanders
- Macedonia, 1915–17
- Landing at Helles
- Gallipoli, 1915–16
- Palestine, 1917–18
- North-West Europe 1940
- Djebel Tanngoucha
- North Africa, 1942–43
- Centuripe
- Sicily, 1943
- Garigliano Crossing
- Cassino II
- Italy, 1943–45
- Yenangyaung, 1942
- Burma, 1942–43

== The Regimental Chapel ==
The Regimental chapel is in St Macartin's Cathedral, Enniskillen.

== Great War memorials ==
- Ulster Tower Memorial, Thiepval, France.
- Irish National War Memorial Gardens, Dublin.
- Island of Ireland Peace Park, Messines, Belgium.
- Menin Gate Memorial, Ypres, Belgium.
- County Fermanagh War Memorial, Enniskillen, Northern Ireland

== Victoria Cross ==
Recipients of the Victoria Cross:

- Captain Gerald Robert O'Sullivan, 1st Battalion. 1/2 July 1915, Gallipoli.
- Sergeant James Somers, 1st Battalion. 1/2 July 1915, Gallipoli.
- Captain Eric Norman Frankland Bell, (attached to 4th Trench Mortar Battery) 1 July 1916, Thiepval.
- Lieutenant Colonel John Sherwood-Kelly (Norfolk Regiment) CMG DSO, commanding 1st Battalion, 20 November 1917, Marcoing, Cambrai.
- Second Lieutenant James Samuel Emerson, 9th Battalion, 6 December 1917, Hindenburg Line, Cambrai.
- Private James Duffy, 6th Battalion, 27 December 1917, Kereina Peak, Palestine.
- Lance Corporal Ernest Seaman, 2nd Battalion, 29 September 1918, Terhand, Belgium.
- Private Norman Harvey, 1st Battalion, 25 October 1918, Ingoyghem, Belgium.

== Regimental Colonels ==
Colonels of the Regiment were:

- 1881–1884: (1st Battalion) Gen. Randal Rumley (ex 27th Foot)
- 1881: (2nd Battalion) Gen. Sir Edward Harris Greathed, KCB (ex 108th Foot)
- 1881–1886: (2nd Battalion) Gen. Hon. Sir Arthur Edward Hardinge, KCB, CIE
- 1886–1898: (2nd Battalion) Lt-Gen. Sir James Talbot Airey, KCB
- 1884–1891: (1st Battalion) No appointment
- 1891–1893: (1st Battalion) Lt-Gen. John Neptune Sargent, CB
- 1898–1902: Lt-Gen. William Roberts, CB
- 1902–1911: Gen. Nathaniel Stevenson
- 1911–1923: Gen. Sir Archibald James Murray, GCB, GCMG, CVO, DSO
- 1923–1941: Lt-Gen. Sir Travers Edwards Clarke, GBE, KCB, KCMG
- 1941–1947: F.M. Sir Claude John Eyre Auchinleck, GCB, GCIE, CSI, DSO, OBE
- 1947–1960: Brig. Eric Edward James Moore, DSO
- 1960–1966: Maj-Gen. Denis Grattan Moore, CB
- 1966–1968: Maj-Gen. Ewing Henry Wrigley Grimshaw, CB, CBE, DSO
- 1968 Regiment amalgamated with The Royal Ulster Rifles and The Royal Irish Fusiliers to form the Royal Irish Rangers

== See also ==
- List of British Army regiments (1881)
