= John McNutt (priest) =

Irish priest

John Alexander Miller McNutt (1914–1992) was Dean of Clogher from 1982 until 1984.

He qualified from Edgehill Theological College, Belfast (a Methodist institution) in 1937; and was ordained into the Church of Ireland a decade later. He began his Anglican ministry with a curacy at Drummullan. He was Rector of Trory from 1957 to 1973; Rural Dean of Enniskillen from 1959 to 1965; Chaplain to the Bishop of Clogher from 1965 to 1973; Rural Dean of Kilskeery from 1967 to 1973; Rector of Magheracross from 1973 to 1984; Prebendary of Clogher Cathedral from 1973 to 1980; and its Chancellor from 1980 to 1984.

Church of Ireland titles
Preceded by Thomas Clements	Dean of Clogher; 1982–1984	Succeeded by Brian Desmond Anthony Hannon
