= Arthur Haire-Forster =

Irish religious figure

Arthur Newburgh Haire-Forster JP (1846–1932) was Dean of Clogher from 1911 until his death. He was High Sheriff of Monaghan in 1898.

He was educated at Portora Royal School and Trinity College, Dublin and ordained in 1869. After a curacy in Collinstown he was the incumbent at Currin from 1874 to 1876. From 1876 to 1900 he was on the staff of his old college. Later he was Rector of Clogher. He was also Prebendary of Clogher from 1901 to 1911.

He died on 3 January 1932.

Church of Ireland titles
Preceded by Charles Thomas Ovenden	Dean of Clogher; 1911–1932	Succeeded by Hugh MacManaway
