= Dean of Clogher =

Church of Ireland official

The Dean of Clogher is a dignitary of the Diocese of Clogher within the Church of Ireland. The title may be held by any licensed incumbent in the diocese, not necessarily the rector of one of the cathedral parishes of Clogher. The Dean, with the Cathedral chapter, has responsibility for the cathedral life of St Macartan's, Clogher and St Macartin's, Enniskillen.

The current incumbent is Kenny Hall, rector of Enniskillen.

== Deans of Clogher ==
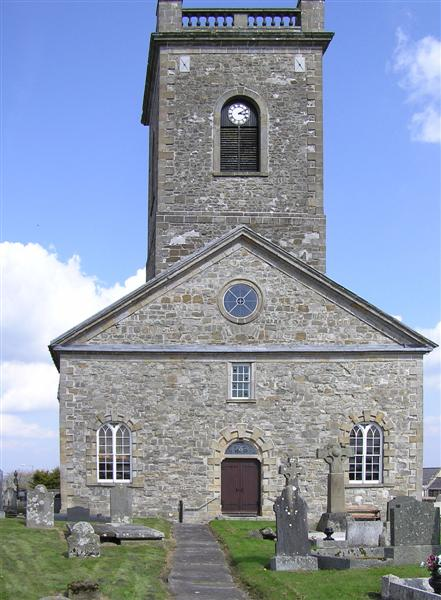
St Macartan's Cathedral, Clogher

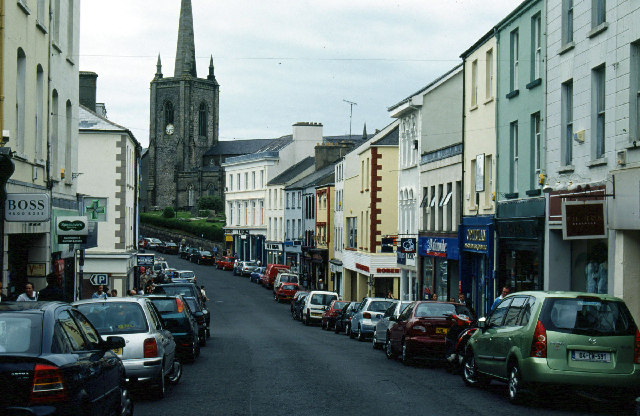
St Macartan's Cathedral, Enniskillen

- 1390 Peter O'Heoghain
- 1411 Donal O'Heoghain
- 1422–1451 Philip O'Mulloyre
- ?–1498 Charles Maguire
- ?–1508 William McCaghwell
- 1530–? Odo
- 1606 Robert Openshawe (afterwards Dean of Connor)
- 1617 Robert Berkeley (aka Barclay)
- 1660/1–1667 John Hodson (afterwards Bishop of Elphin, 1667)
- 1667–1675 John Roan (afterwards Bishop of Killaloe, 1675)
- 1675–1682 Richard Tennison (afterwards Bishop of Killala, 1682 and Bishop of Meath, 1697)
- 1682–1716 Joseph Wilkins
- 1716–1724 William Gore (afterwards Dean of Down, 1724)
- 1724–1727 Jonathan Smedley
- 1727/8–1730 Pascal (or Paul) Ducasse
- 1730 Edward Cresset
- 1737/8–1743 John Copping
- 1743–1761 William Langton
- 1761–1763 Edward Young (afterwards Bishop of Dromore, 1763)
- 1763–1781 Richard Woodward (afterwards Bishop of Cloyne, 1781)
- 1781–1799 Cadogan Keatinge
- 1799–1805 John Beresford (afterwards Bishop of Cork and Ross, 1805)
- 1805–1825 Richard Bagwell
- 1826–1861 Robert Maude
- 1862–1873 Ogle Moore
- 1873–1899 Thomas Le Ban Kennedy
- 1900–1903 George Tottenham
- 1903–1911 Charles Thomas Ovenden (afterwards Dean of St Patrick's Cathedral, 1911)
- 1911–1932 Arthur Newburgh Haire-Forster
- 1932–1950 Hugh MacManaway
- 1950–1958 Robert McTighe
- 1959–1962 William Morris
- 1962–1966 Robert Mollan
- 1966–1982 Thomas Clements
- 1982–1984 John McNutt
- 1985–1986 Brian Hannon (afterwards Bishop of Clogher, 1986)
- 1986–1989 Nevil O'Neill
- 1989–1994 John McCarthy
- 1995–2004 Thomas Moore
- 2005–2009 Raymond Thompson
- 2009–present Kenny Hall
