= John Edward Healy =

Irish journalist and barrister

John Edward Healy (1872–1934) was an Irish journalist and barrister and was editor of The Irish Times from 1907 until 1934. His 27 years as editor is the longest for that position at the paper.

== Early life and education ==
Healy was born on St. Patrick's day 1872, in Drogheda, County Louth, the son of a solicitor, James Stanislaus Healy, and his wife Kate Mary Appleyard, who was the daughter of a Church of Ireland clergyman. Educated at Drogheda Grammar School and Trinity College Dublin, he graduated with a degree in Literature and Classics, winning prizes while at college. He studied law and was called to the bar in 1906 although he never practised.

== Career and political involvement ==
Healy taught in Rathmines and at Alexandra College. A journalist, he wrote for the Dublin Evening Mail, and was editor of it for two years, before joining The Irish Times. During his time at The Irish Times he also served as special representative in Ireland for The Times of London.. A member of the Church of Ireland, he served as editor of The Church of Ireland Gazette.

Healy was a staunch Unionist, and shots were fired at his home during the War of Independence. He defended the Unionist cause in his writings in The Irish Times as noted in his obituary in The Times of London which described him as "the protagonist of a losing cause".

== Personal life ==
Healy married Adeline Alton in 1898 and had two sons. Ernest Alton Healy was a flight lieutenant with the Royal Air Force, and Lewis Edward Healy was a journalist. He died in 1934 at the age of 62.
