= Thomas Clements =

Irish dean (1916–1983)

Thomas Clements (3 February 1916 – 15 November 1983) was an Irish clergyman who served as the Dean of Clogher from 1966 until 1982.

Clements was born in Cloghan, County Offaly on 3 February 1916. He was educated at Trinity College, Dublin, and ordained in 1940. After curacies in Belfast, Ballymachugh and Mullaghdun he held incumbencies at Finner and Enniskillen until his time as dean.

Clements regularly travelled to the United States to give sermons. In 1981, he gave a sermon in New York and discussed The Troubles. He died on 15 November 1983, at the age of 67.

Church of Ireland titles
Preceded by Robert Augustine Mollan	Dean of Clogher; 1966–1982	Succeeded by John Alexander Miller McNutt
