= Jackson Lawlor =

Irish priest

Hugh Jackson Lawlor (11 December 1860 – 26 December 1938) was an Irish Anglican priest and author. He is best remembered for his term as Dean of St Patrick's Cathedral, Dublin.

Hugh Jackson Lawlor was born in Ballymena, County Antrim. He was educated at Drogheda Grammar School, Rathmines School, Dublin and Trinity College Dublin from where he graduated with BA in mathematics in 1882, getting his MA in 1885. For a while in the 1880s, he was an examiner in mathematics for the Intermediate Board of Education. He was a curate at Christ Church, Kingstown (modern day Dunleary) from 1885 to 1893 then an assistant to Archbishop King's Lecturer in Divinity at Trinity College Dublin. He was Senior Chaplain of St Mary's Cathedral, Edinburgh from 1893 to 1898 and then Professor of Ecclesiastical History at the University of Dublin. From 1924 until his retirement in 1933 he served as the (Church of Ireland) Dean of St Patrick's Cathedral, Dublin.

Coat of arms of Jackson Lawlor
Notes Confirmed 29 April 1925 by Sir Nevile Rodwell Wilkinson, Ulster King of Arms. Crest On a wreath of the colours an arm embowed vested Sable cuffed Argent the hand Proper grasping a short sword Or. Escutcheon Quarterly 1st & 4th Or a lion rampant Gules on a canton Azure a crescent Argent 2nd & 3rd Argent three martlets Gules within a bordure Or (Cairnes). Motto Fortis Et Fidelis

Church of Ireland titles
Preceded by Charles Thomas Ovenden	Dean of St Patrick’s Cathedral, Dublin; 1924–1933	Succeeded by Thomas Arnold Harvey
