= Norman Harvey =

English soldier (1899–1942)

Norman Harvey VC
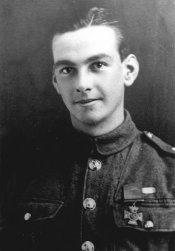
- Born: 6 April 1899; Newton-le-Willows, Lancashire, England
- Died: 16 February 1942 (aged 42); Haifa, Mandatory Palestine
- Burial place: Khayat Beach War Cemetery, Haifa
- Military career
- Allegiance: United Kingdom
- Branch: British Army
- Rank: Company Quartermaster Sergeant
- Units: South Lancashire Regiment; Royal Inniskilling Fusiliers; Royal Engineers
- Conflicts: World War I: Hundred Days Offensive; World War II: Mediterranean and Middle East theatre †
- Awards: Victoria Cross

Company Quartermaster Sergeant Norman Harvey VC (6 April 1899 –16 February 1942) was a British Army soldier and an English recipient of the Victoria Cross, the highest and most prestigious award for gallantry in the face of the enemy that can be awarded to British and Commonwealth forces. He re-enlisted in World War II and was killed in action.

== Early life ==
Harvey was born on 6 April 1899 in Bull Cottages, Newton-le-Willows to Charles William and Mary Harvey. He married Nora Osmond. He was initially educated at St Peter's Church of England School before working briefly at Messrs Randall in the High Street, from where he took up employment with Messrs Caulfields' at Newton.

In November 1914, three months after the outbreak of World War I, he joined the South Lancashire Regiment of the British Army, aged just 15, and was wounded while serving on the Western Front with his regiment.

== World War I ==
Harvey was 19 years old, and a Private in the 1st Battalion, The Royal Inniskilling Fusiliers, British Army during the First World War when on 25 October 1918 at Ingoyghem, Belgium, he performed a deed for which he was awarded the Victoria Cross:

=== Citation ===
No. 42954 Pte. Norman Harvey, 1st Bn., R. Innis. Fus. (Newton-le-Willows).

For most conspicuous bravery and devotion to duty near Ingoyghen on the 25th October, 1918, when his battalion was held up and suffered heavy casualties from enemy machine guns. On his own initiative he rushed forward and engaged the enemy single-handed, killing 20 opposing soldiers and capturing two guns. Later, when his company was checked by another enemy strong point, he again rushed forward alone and put the enemy to flight.

Subsequently, after dark, he voluntarily carried out, single-handed; an important reconnaissance and gained valuable information. Pte. Harvey throughout the day displayed the greatest valour, and his several actions enabled the line to advance, saved many casualties, and inspired all.

— London Gazette

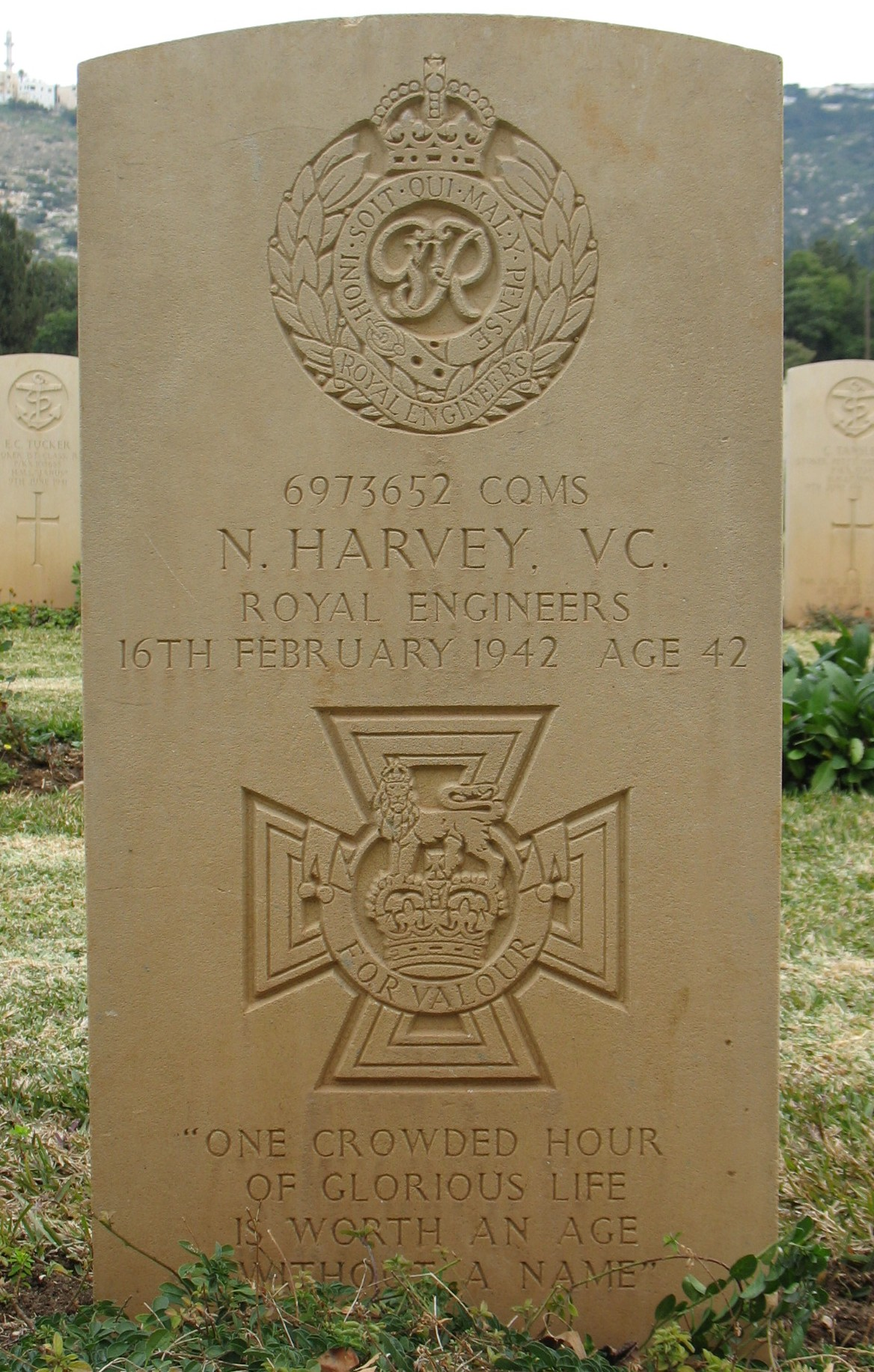
Harvey's grave in Khayat Beach cemetery, Haifa, Israel

== World War II ==
=== Death ===
Harvey enlisted into the Royal Engineers in 1939 and joined 199 Railway Workshop Company. He was promoted to company quartermaster sergeant in April 1941. He was killed in action, near Haifa, Mandatory Palestine (now Israel) on 16 February 1942.

== Victoria Cross ==
Harvey's VC is displayed at the Regimental Museum of The Royal Inniskilling Fusiliers in Enniskillen Castle, Enniskillen, Northern Ireland.

== Bibliography ==
- Napier, Gerald (1998). The Sapper VCs: The Story of Valour in the Royal Engineers and Its Associated Corps. The Stationery Office. ISBN 978-0117728356.
- Gliddon, Gerald (2014) [2000]. The Final Days 1918. VCs of the First World War. Stroud, Gloucestershire: History Press. ISBN 978-0-7509-5368-9.
