= George Tottenham =

George Tottenham (20 October 1825 – 20 October 1911) was Dean of Clogher from 1900 to 1903.

He was the 10th son of Lord Robert Ponsonby Tottenham Loftus, Bishop of Clogher from 1822 to 1850, and the Hon. Alicia Maude, daughter of Cornwallis Maude, 1st Viscount Hawarden. He was educated at Sherborne and Trinity College, Cambridge. Ordained in 1849, after curacies in Donaghmore and Tynan he was Rector of Inishmacsaint. He was also Dean of St. Patrick's Cathedral, Dublin and was made a Freeman of Dublin in 1861. He married Emily Frances Maclean, the eldest surviving daughter of Rev. William Maclean, Prebendary of Tynan, County Armagh. Together, they had seven children, only one of whom, Edward, went on to have children of his own.

Church of Ireland titles
Preceded by Thomas Le Ban Kennedy	Dean of Clogher; 1900–1903	Succeeded by Charles Thomas Ovenden
