= Drogheda Grammar School =

Irish multi-denominational school

Coordinates: 53°43′8″N 6°18′13″W

- Drogheda Grammar School
- Drogheda; Ireland

Information
- Type: Private, independent, coeducational Day school
- Motto: Floreat (flourish) - Every individual is of value and has something to contribute.
- Denomination: Quaker
- Established: 1669; 357 years ago
- Head of campus: Hugh Baker
- Staff: 58
- Enrolment: c. 520
- Colours: Green, Red and Black
- Website: droghedagrammarschool.ie

Drogheda Grammar School is an Irish co-educational multi-denominational school, located on Mornington Road, Drogheda, County Louth.

== History ==
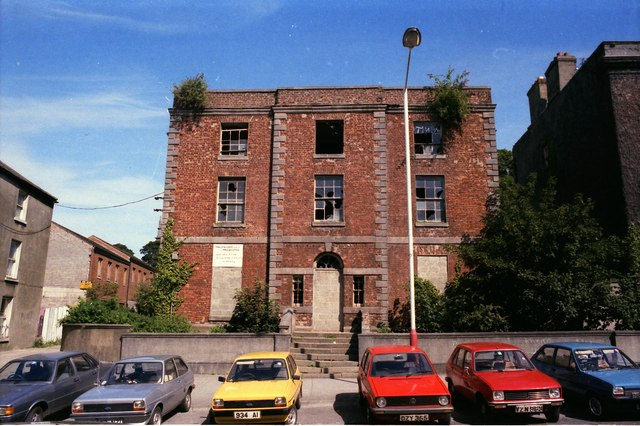
Mr. Clarke's Free School, Laurence St., Drogheda in June 1984

Drogheda Grammar School was founded under Royal Charter in 1669 by Erasmus Smith and is one of the oldest secondary schools in Ireland. It was originally a boys' boarding school, but is now a co-educational day school with over 500 pupils.

It is owned by a company with charitable status called Drogheda Grammar School Ltd. This structure was set up in the early 1950s when a group of local people (mostly Quakers) saved the school from closure. Although the school is not a Quaker school, it is run under the Quaker principle of "every individual is of value and has something to contribute".

The school's campus, located just outside Drogheda, consists of a Regency house flanked by woodland, with classroom and dormitory buildings and playing fields.

== Campus ==
Drogheda Grammar School is located on 18 acres in a rural setting off of Mornington Road, Drogheda, County Louth. The original building on its current campus was owned by Chief Justice Henry Singleton. The school opened a new building in 2012. This building includes a library/writing centre, technology workshop, DCG room, and a Home Economics room. There is a small reflection room which has a stained glass window originally made in contribution to the memory of a student who died in 1942 by Harry Clarke Stained Glass Studio in the 1940s and was in storage since 1976 after the school was moved from Lawrence Street. The school has three tennis courts, four playing pitches, a large gymnasium, and a floodlit AstroTurf pitch.

== Past pupils ==
- Balthazar Foster, 1st Baron Ilkeston (physician and Liberal MP)
- Arthur Wellesley, 1st Duke of Wellington (soldier and Prime Minister)
- Jackson Lawlor (Anglican priest and writer)
- Edward Moore (Bishop of Kilmore, Elphin and Ardagh)
- Sir Henry Cuthbert (lawyer and politician in Australia)
- Henry Grattan (politician)
- Henry Flood (politician)
- Robert Adrain (United Irishman and politician)
- John Cunningham (poet, dramatist and actor)
- Richard Lovell Edgeworth (politician, writer and inventor)
- John Edward Healy (longest serving editor of the Irish Times)
- Derek Landy (author and screenwriter)
- John Robert Leslie (Irish academic)
- Jill Meagher (Irish Australian homicide victim)
- Henry Singleton (Chief Justice of Ireland)
- George Forbes, 3rd Earl of Granard (Royal Navy commander)
- John Kells Ingram (Irish mathematician, economist and writer)
- Deirdre Gogarty (Irish boxer)
- Jonathan Kelly (Irish folk/rock singer and musician)
- Alexander Williams (1846–1930, Irish painter, singer and taxidermist)
