= John Roan (bishop) =

17th-century Church of Ireland bishop

John Roan, D.D. (died 5 September 1692) was a Church of Ireland Bishop of Killaloe.

He was born in Wales and educated at Brasenose College, Oxford and awarded Doctor of Divinity (D.D.) by Trinity College Dublin in 1666. He was made pro-vice-chancellor of the university the following year; and also appointed Dean of Clogher.

Roan was chaplain to James Margetson, Archbishop of Armagh, who appointed him Bishop of Killaloe. He was consecrated in June 1675 and was one of the few Anglican bishops to remain in Ireland during the subsequent religious strife of the Williamite war in Ireland, for which he suffered financially.

Roan died in office in 1692 at the Episcopal House at Killaloe and was buried in Killaloe Cathedral. His tomb is inscribed: "Hic jacet corpus Joannis Roan, S.S. Theologiae Doctoris, Laonensis Episcopi, qui obiit 5° die Septembris, A.D. 1692." (Here lies the body of John Roan, DD and Bishop of Killaloe, who died on 5 September 1692)
