= The Clinton Centre =

Coordinates: 54°20′40″N 07°38′05″W

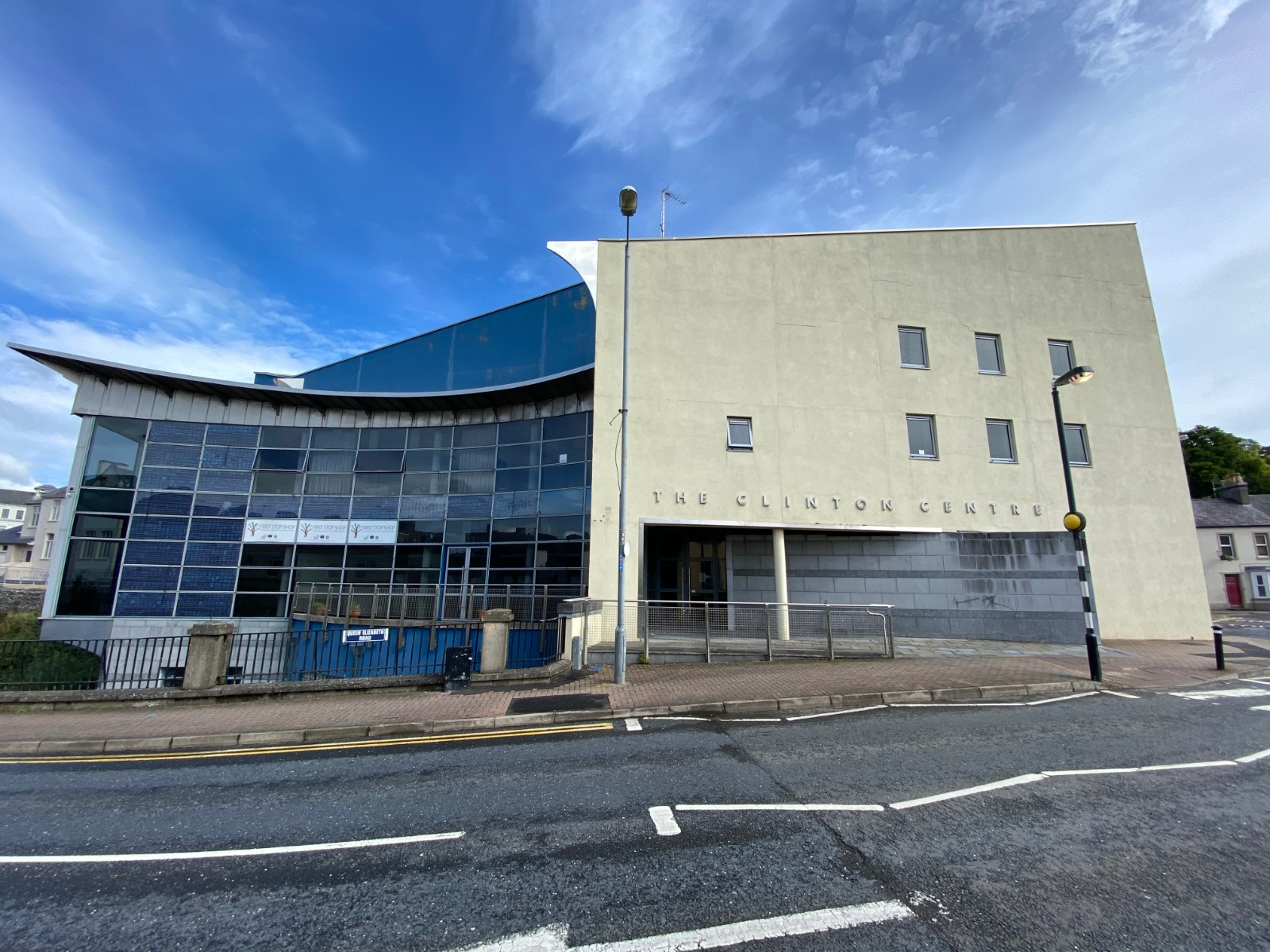
The Clinton Centre from the island of Enniskillen

The Clinton Centre is situated on the site of the Remembrance Day bombing of 8 November 1987 in Enniskillen, County Fermanagh, Northern Ireland, in which the Provisional Irish Republican Army murdered 12 and injured 63 with a time bomb. Former President of the United States of America Bill Clinton gave his name to the facility in dedication to peace and prosperity in Ireland and around the world and has visited the site several times along with his wife, Hillary Clinton.

== History of the building ==
The building stands on the site of the Reading Rooms owned by St. Michael's Catholic Church which was destroyed in the bombing in 1987. The Centre was conceived as part of the Higher Bridges Project, bridging this site with the former Enniskillen Orange Hall.

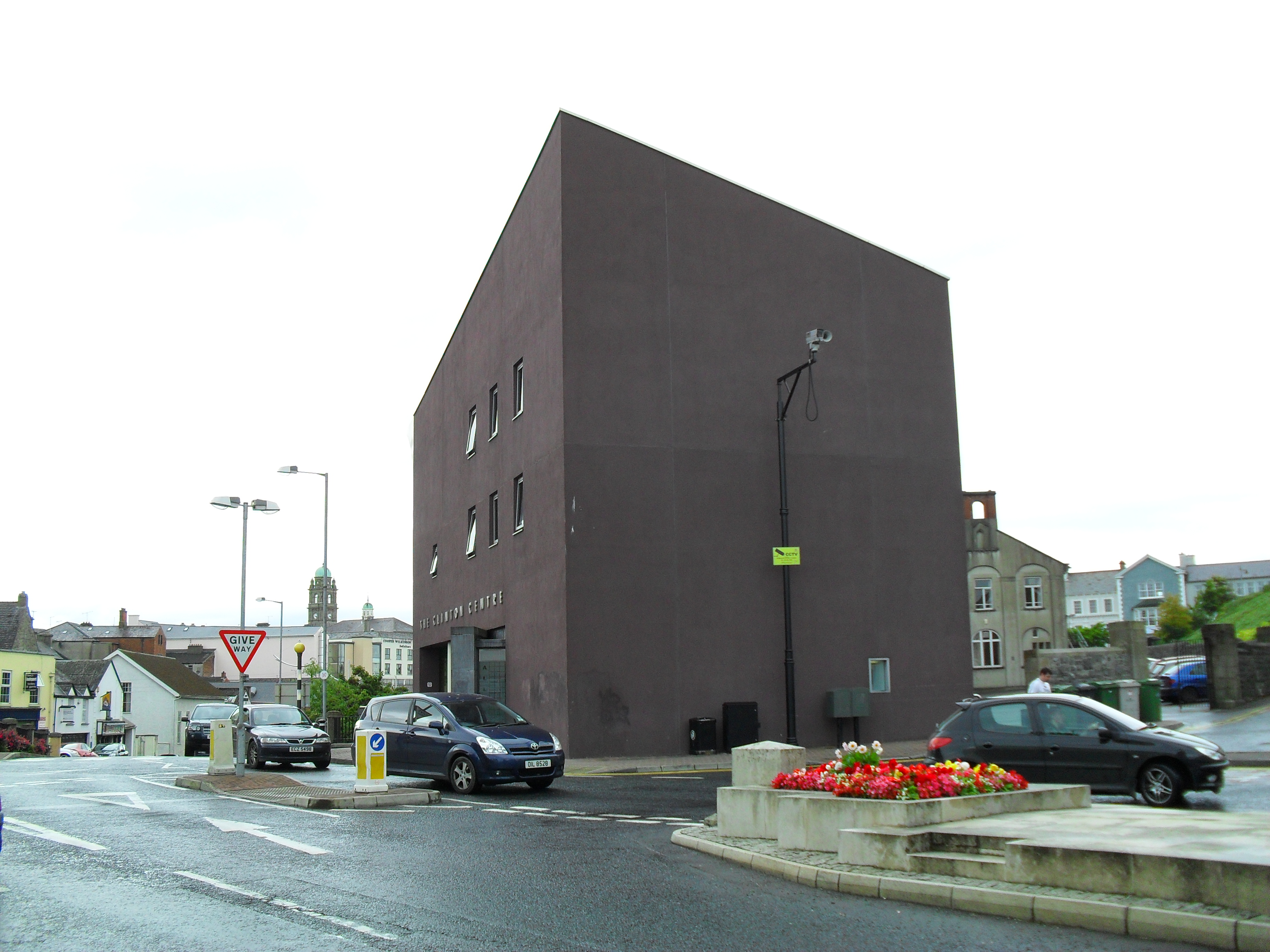
The Clinton Centre, old view

Plans were laid in 2000 to construct a new structure to balance the restored Orange Hall, a listed building. This was coordinated by Fermanagh-University Partnership Board.

In 2001 President Bill Clinton visited the site, returning again in 2002 to officially open the building and lend his name to it. During a subsequent visit in 2004, when he was accompanied by his wife Senator Hillary Clinton, he witnessed the work being undertaken within the centre in peace-building projects. The Centre housed a fully equipped conference floor, a restaurant, internet cafe and Art Gallery. Hostelling International Northern Ireland managed The Bridges Youth Hostel within the Clinton Centre until December 2012.

In October 2017, Dublin City University, Ulster University and University of Massachusetts (UMass) came together in a joint initiative to renew and enhance the peace-building vision of the Clinton Centre in Enniskillen. President Clinton announced the initiative during a visit to Belfast. The new agreement will see the three universities unite to create a new, sustainable operational model for the Centre, in keeping with President Clinton’s commitment to peace and reconciliation on the island of Ireland. The plan will deliver a programme of both academic and cultural activities and events in the Centre over the next three years.

In 2019 the non-profit organization UISCE (Understanding Ireland Socially, Culturally and Economically) launched a volunteer program to reestablish the purpose of the building, with a view to primarily becoming an educational hub for students and emerging leaders focussing on peace building.
