= St Macartan's Cathedral, Clogher =

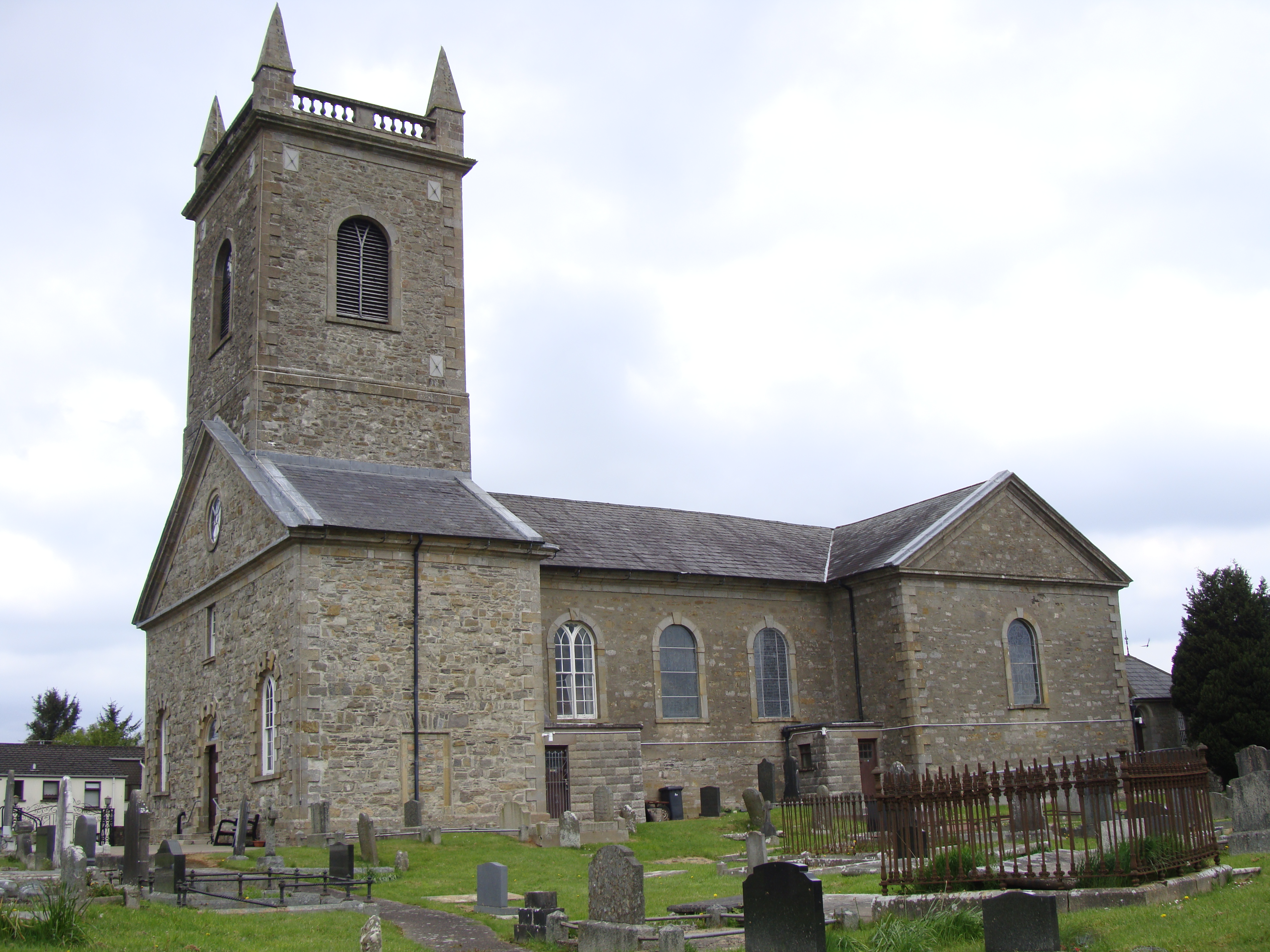
- St Macartan's Cathedral, Clogher
- St Macartan's Cathedral, Clogher
- 54°24′39″N 07°10′19″W
- Location: Clogher, County Tyrone
- Country: Northern Ireland
- Denomination: Church of Ireland
- Website: https://clogher.anglican.org/Parishes/index.php?p=clogher&pg=7

Architecture
- Architect: James Martin
- Completed: 1744

Administration
- Province: Province of Armagh
- Diocese: Diocese of Clogher

Clergy
- Bishop: The Right Reverend Ian Ellis
- Rector: Vacant
- Dean: The Very Revd Kenneth Hall

St Macartan's Cathedral, Clogher is one of two cathedral churches in the Diocese of Clogher (the other is St Macartin's Cathedral, Enniskillen) in the Church of Ireland. It is in the village of Clogher, County Tyrone, Northern Ireland in the ecclesiastical province of Armagh.

It was designed in 1744 by architect James Martin in a neo-classical style.

== History ==
According to tradition a monastery and bishopric were founded in Clogher circa 490 by St. Macartan on the orders of his friend Saint Patrick.

In 1041, the church of Clogher was rebuilt, and dedicated to the memory of St. Macartin. It was again rebuilt in 1295 by Matthew M'Catasaid, Bishop of Clogher, but burnt to the ground on 20 April 1396 along with two chapels, the abbey, the court of the bishops, and thirty-two other buildings with all their contents. In 1610 the abbey and its revenues were confiscated by King James I and given to the Diocese of Clogher.

The present building was erected on the site in 1744 and contains some fine stained-glass windows. Located near the church are the remains of two high crosses and a five-foot high sundial.

== Burials ==
- Brian Mac Cathmhaoil, Bishop of Clogher (1356–1358). He died of the plague in 1358.
- Art Mac Cathmhaoil (Mac Cawell), Bishop of Clogher (1390–1432) a pious man, who had kept a house of public hospitality for the poor and indigent, died after penance in 1432.
- Robert Leslie (died 1672), Bishop of Clogher

== See also ==
- Dean of Clogher
