= St Macartin's Cathedral, Enniskillen =

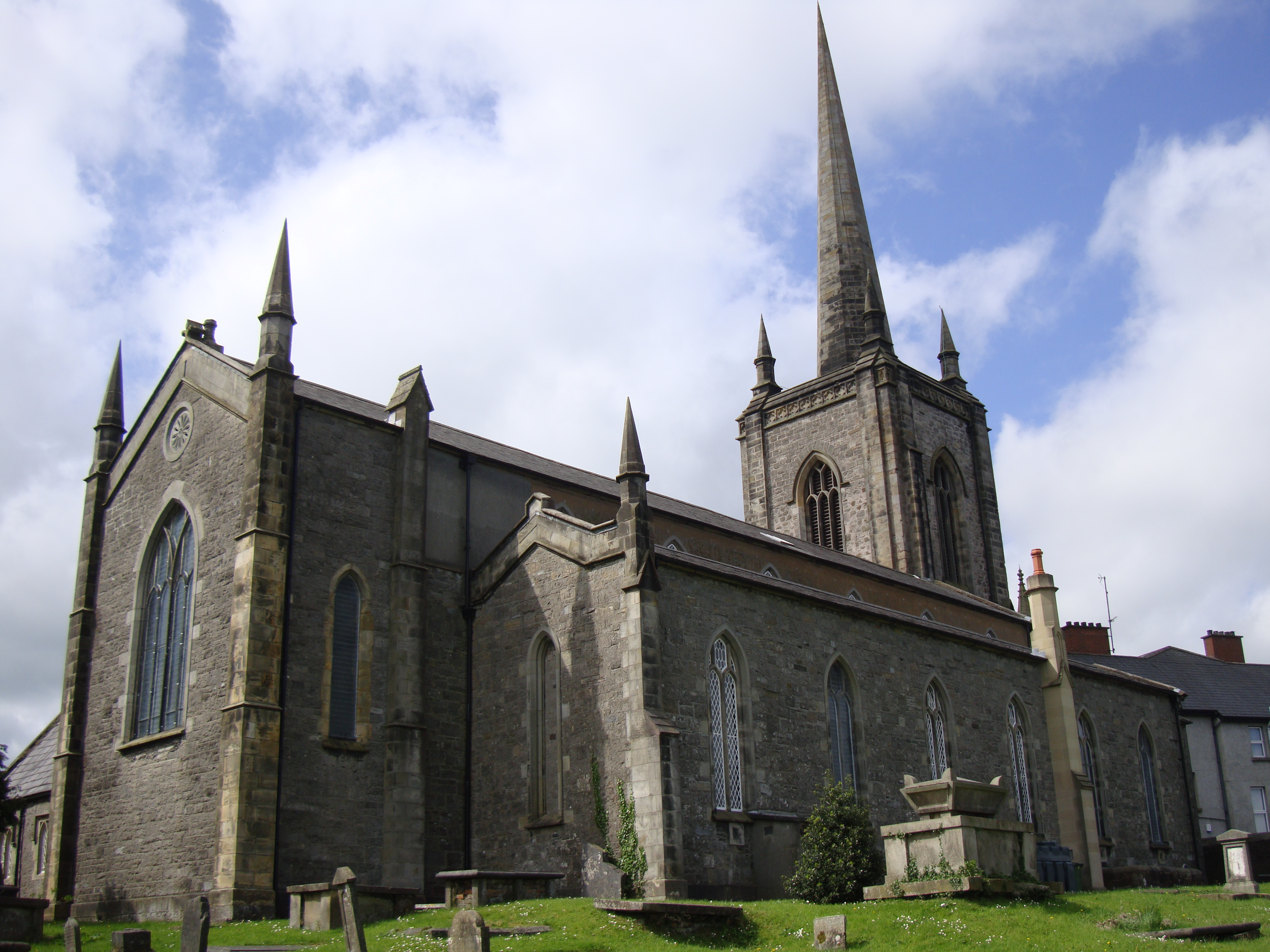
- St Macartin's Cathedral, Enniskillen
- St Macartin's Cathedral, Enniskillen
- 54°20′48″N 07°38′28″W
- Location: Enniskillen, County Fermanagh
- Country: Northern Ireland
- Denomination: Church of Ireland
- Website: www.enniskillencathedral.com

History
- Former name: St Anne's Parish Church
- Dedication: Saint Macartan
- Dedicated: 1923

Architecture
- Completed: 1842; 184 years ago (as St Anne's Parish Church)

Administration
- Province: Province of Armagh
- Diocese: Diocese of Clogher

Clergy
- Bishop: The Rt Revd Dr Ian Ellis
- Rector: The Very Revd Kenneth Hall
- Dean: The Very Revd Kenneth Hall

St Macartin's Cathedral, Enniskillen, is one of two cathedral churches in the Diocese of Clogher (the other is St Macartan's Cathedral, Clogher) in the Church of Ireland. It stands on high ground overlooking the town of Enniskillen, County Fermanagh, Northern Ireland in the ecclesiastical province of Armagh.

It was completed in 1842 as St Anne's Parish Church but rededicated as St Macartin's Cathedral in 1923. It incorporates elements of a former church building and has a 150-foot (45 m) tower and spire. The tower houses a peal of ten bells, which can also be chimed to play tunes. The three manual electro-pneumatic action organ consists of thirty-three operated speaking stops, together with full pedal board and enclosed swell and choir divisions.

The dean and chapter of Clogher have their stalls in this cathedral and also at the senior cathedral in Clogher.

== History ==
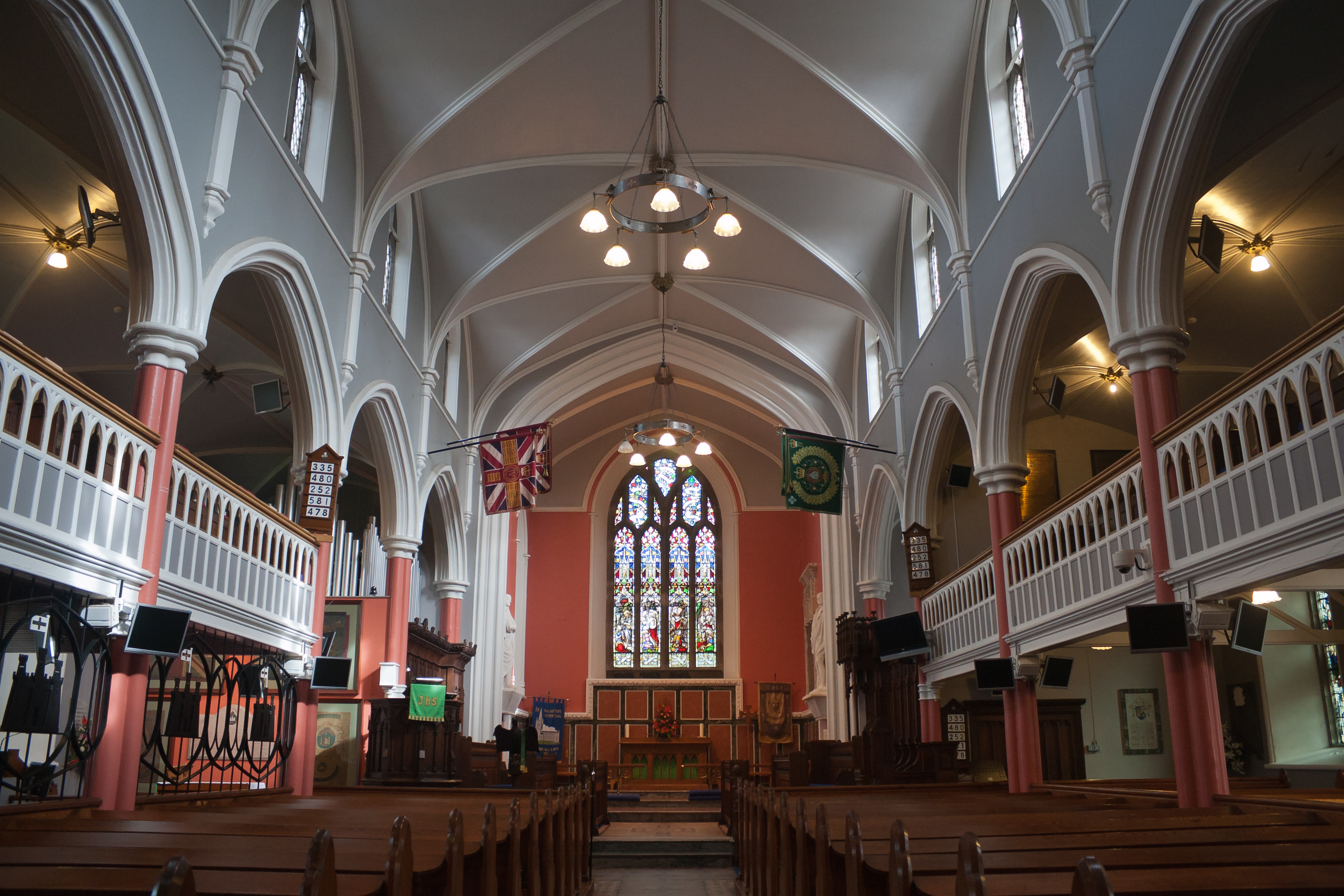
Interior

The first church building on the site was completed around 1627 as part of the original building of the town of Enniskillen by Sir William Cole. By 1832 that building had become structurally unsafe and was replaced by the present building, which was completed in 1842. The chancel was enlarged in 1889.

In 1923 the church was rededicated as St Macartin's Cathedral, thus becoming the second cathedral of Clogher Diocese.

On 26 June 2012, Queen Elizabeth II attended a thanksgiving service at the cathedral for her Diamond Jubilee. The service was led by Kenneth Hall, the Dean of Clogher, the address was given by Alan Harper, the Anglican Archbishop of Armagh and the lesson was read by Peter Robinson, the First Minister of Northern Ireland. The intercession prayers were read by Ken Lindsay, the President of the Methodist Church in Ireland, Seán Brady, the Roman Catholic Archbishop of Armagh and Roy Patton, the Moderator of the General Assembly of the Presbyterian Church in Ireland. Following the service, the Queen made the short walk to St Michael's Catholic church where she met representatives of local community groups. This was the first time that she had visited a Catholic church in Northern Ireland.

In March 2023, the Cathedral celebrated 400 years of worship on the site, in a service attended by the Bishop of Clogher, Dean of Clogher, and Archbishop John McDowell, Primate of All Ireland, with a reading by the Lord Lieutenant of Fermanagh, Viscount Brookeborough.

== See also ==
- Dean of Clogher
