= Diocese of Clogher (Church of Ireland) =

Anglican diocese of the Church of Ireland

Arms of the Diocese of Clogher

The Diocese of Clogher (Irish: Deoise Chlochair; /ˈklɔː.ər/, /ˈklɒ.hər/) is a diocese of the Church of Ireland in the north of Ireland. It is in the ecclesiastical province of Armagh. It covers a rural area on the border between Northern Ireland and the Republic of Ireland including much of south west Ulster, taking in most of the counties Fermanagh and Monaghan and parts of counties Cavan, Leitrim and Donegal.

The diocese has two diocesan cathedrals, St Macartan's Cathedral, Clogher and St Macartin's Cathedral, Enniskillen, yet having a single Dean and Chapter between them.

== Overview and history ==
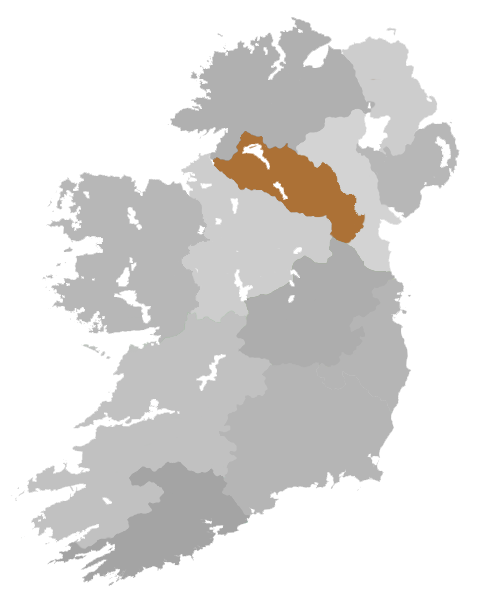
Diocese Highlighted

The Diocese was formed in 1111 at the Synod of Rathbreasail as the see for the Kingdom of Uí Chremthainn. The See was removed to Louth between 1135 and 1197, possibly to consolidate the power of the Bishop over against smaller Sees, before being returned to Clougher. At this time Louth was moved to the Diocese of Armagh, and the Ardstraw part of the diocese given to the Diocese of Derry. Church property that existed at the time of the Reformation, buildings included, was retained by the reformed Church of Ireland, then in the 19th century, at the time of the Disestablishment of the Church, confiscated by the state. Schools, churches and cathedrals were however returned to the Church. The diocese is rare within the Anglican Communion in having two diocesan cathedrals, the other diocese being Argyll and the Isles in Scotland, with cathedrals at Oban and on the isle of Cumbrae.

During the 18th century Clogher was one of the Bishop’s boroughs of the Parliament of Ireland where the Bishop of the Diocese awarded the parliamentary seat as a gift.

== List of the Bishops of Clogher ==
The following is a basic list of the post-Reformation Church of Ireland bishops.

- Hugh O'Carolan (1535–1569)
- Miler Magrath (1570–1571)
- See vacant (1571–1605)
- George Montgomery (1605–1621)
- James Spottiswood (1621–1645)
- Henry Jones (1645–1661)
- John Leslie (1661–1671)
- Robert Leslie (1671–1672)
- Roger Boyle (1672–1687)
- See vacant (1687–1690)
- Richard Tennison (1691–1697)
- St George Ashe (1697–1717)
- John Stearne (1717–1745)
- Robert Clayton (1745–1758)
- John Garnett (1758–1782)
- Sir John Hotham, 9th Bt. (1782–1795)
- William Foster (1796–1797)
- John Porter (1797–1819)
- Lord John Beresford (1819–1820)
- Hon. Percy Jocelyn (1820–1822)
- Robert Tottenham Loftus (1822–1850)

In 1850, Clogher was united with Armagh.

- Lord John Beresford (again) (1850–1862)
- Marcus Beresford (1862–1885)

In 1886, Clogher was separated from Armagh.

- Charles Stack (1886–1902)
- Charles D'Arcy (1903–1907)
- Maurice Day (1908–1923)
- James MacManaway (1923–1943)
- Richard Tyner (1944–1958)
- Alan Buchanan (1958–1969)
- Richard Hanson (1970–1973)
- Robert Heavener (1973–1980)
- Gordon McMullan (1980–1986)
- Brian Hannon (1986–2001)
- Michael Jackson (2002–2011)
- John McDowell (2011–2020)
- Ian Ellis (2020–present)

== See also ==
- List of Anglican dioceses in the United Kingdom and Ireland
- Dean of Clogher List of deans
