= Joseph Duffy =

Joseph Duffy may refer to:

- Joseph Duffy (bishop) (born 1934), Irish bishop
- Joseph Duffy (cricketer) (1860–1936), Australian cricketer
- Joe Duffy (born 1956), Irish radio personality
- Joseph Duffy (fighter) (born 1988), Irish mixed martial arts fighter

== See also ==
- Joseph Duffey (1932–2021), American academic, educator and political appointee
