= Liam MacDaid =

Irish Roman Catholic prelate (1945–2023)

The Most Reverend Liam MacDaid HDip
- Bishop Emeritus of Clogher
- Church: Roman Catholic
- Diocese: Clogher
- Appointed: 6 May 2010
- Installed: 25 July 2010
- Term ended: 1 October 2016
- Predecessor: Joseph Duffy
- Successor: Lawrence Duffy
- Other posts: Chairperson of the Council for Marriage and the Family of the Irish Catholic Bishops' Conference; Vice-Chairperson of Accord
- Previous posts: Chancellor, Secretary, Communications Officer and Chairman of the council of priests of the Diocese of Clogher; Administrator at Tyholland parish President and Teacher at St Macartan's College

Orders
- Ordination: 15 June 1969 by John Charles McQuaid
- Consecration: 25 July 2010 by Seán Brady

Personal details
- Born: 19 July 1945 Bundoran, County Donegal, Ireland
- Died: 15 August 2023 (aged 78) France
- Motto: Per Christum Dominum nostrum (Through Christ our Lord)
- Coat of arms

Styles of Liam MacDaid
- Reference style: The Most Reverend
- Spoken style: Your Excellency
- Religious style: Bishop

Liam Seán MacDaid (19 July 1945 – 15 August 2023) was an Irish Roman Catholic prelate who served as Bishop of Clogher between 2010 and 2016.

== Early life and education ==
Liam Seán MacDaid was born in Bundoran, County Donegal on 19 July 1945. He attended primary school at St Louis Infant School and St Macartan's National School, and secondary school at St Macartan's College. MacDaid had a keen interest in Gaelic games, playing for St Joseph's GFC at club level and some Donegal county teams in the early 1970s.

MacDaid began studying for the priesthood at St Patrick's College, Maynooth in 1962, graduating with honours in Celtic studies in 1965 and sacred theology in 1968.

MacDaid was ordained to the priesthood for the Diocese of Clogher on 15 June 1969.

== Presbyteral ministry ==
Following ordination, MacDaid completed a higher diploma in education from St Patrick's College, Maynooth, before returning to the Diocese of Clogher in 1970 for his first diocesan appointment, as a teacher at St Macartan's College, where he subsequently served as president between 1981 and 1989.

MacDaid subsequently completed a diploma in counselling from University College Dublin in 1978, and served as a counselling tutor with the Catholic Marriage Advisory Council, before he was appointed chairman of the diocesan council of priests in 1988.

MacDaid received his first pastoral appointment in 1989, when he was appointed curate in Aghavea/Aghintaine (centred on Brookeborough and Fivemiletown). He was appointed diocesan secretary, diocesan communications officer and administrator in Tyholland in 1993, and subsequently diocesan chancellor the following year. MacDaid was also a founding member of the Association of Management of Catholic Secondary Schools.

MacDaid was appointed Chaplain of His Holiness by Pope John Paul II on 27 February 2002.

== Episcopal ministry ==
MacDaid was appointed Bishop-elect of Clogher by Pope Benedict XVI on 6 May 2010. At the time of his appointment, he was the most recent bishop to have been chosen from among the clergy of his native diocese.

MacDaid was consecrated by the Archbishop of Armagh and Primate of All Ireland, Seán Brady, on 25 July at St Macartan's Cathedral, Monaghan. In his first address as bishop, MacDaid referred to the recent clerical sexual abuse cases in the Church, saying that the church "has been brought to our knees but maybe that is no bad thing".

During his episcopacy, he advocated for greater collaboration between priests and laity, establishing support groups including a pastoral support group and a commission on diocesan liturgy, and initiated a stronger diocesan youth ministry. MacDaid also continued the development and implementation of safeguarding policies and structures initiated by his predecessor, Joseph Duffy, which were reviewed and complimented by the National Board for the Safeguarding of Children in the Catholic Church in Ireland in 2011. He also chaired the Council for Marriage and the Family of the Irish Catholic Bishops' Conference from 2012 until 2016, and served as vice-chairperson of Accord.

MacDaid joined a number of other bishops in releasing a statement on 8 June 2016, ahead of a referendum in the United Kingdom on its membership of the European Union, warning against the impact of a potential Brexit on the peace process in Northern Ireland.

It was announced on 1 October 2016 that McDaid had tendered his resignation on medical grounds to Pope Francis some months previously, and that it had been with immediate effect.

Liam MacDaid died on 15 August 2023, while he was on holiday in France. He was 78.

Catholic Church titles
Preceded by Joseph Duffy	Bishop of Clogher; 2010–2016	Succeeded by Lawrence Duffy
