= St Macartan's Cathedral, Monaghan =

Coordinates: 54°14′40″N 6°57′30″W

- St Macartan's Cathedral, Monaghan
- Location: Monaghan, Ireland
- Denomination: Roman Catholic

History
- Status: Cathedral
- Consecrated: 21 August 1892

Architecture
- Style: Gothic Revival
- Groundbreaking: 1862
- Completed: 1893

Specifications
- Materials: limestone

Administration
- Province: Armagh
- Diocese: Clogher
- Parish: Cathedral

Clergy
- Bishop: Lawrence Duffy

St Macartan's Cathedral is the cathedral church of the Roman Catholic Diocese of Clogher in Ireland. It is located in the townland of Latlurcan, Monaghan town in the ecclesiastical parish of Monaghan and Rackwallace. It was built between the years of 1861 and 1893 and is the only cathedral in the county.

== History ==
The cathedra of the Bishop of Clogher was moved to Monaghan town in the mid-19th century. The plan for the cathedral was proposed in 1858 by Bishop Charles MacNally. The site was purchased in 1861. Architect James Joseph McCarthy (1817–1882) designed the cathedral in a 14th-century Gothic architectural style and work was begun in 1862. Most limestone was quarried locally. Architect William Hague Jr. (1840–1899) from Cavan oversaw the building of the spire after 1882, which stands 88 metres high, as well as the gate lodge. Bishop James Donnelly, bishop of Clogher from 1864 to 1893, oversaw most of the building and dedicated it on 21 August 1892 to the service of God and the patronage of Macartan, the diocese's patron saint.

In 2019 a major program of exterior renovations began on the cathedral with the intention of restoring the building to its original appearance, as decades of vehicle emissions from the nearby N2 national road had discoloured the limestone block work. Urgent repairs to the roofing and replacement of stonework were also performed, as well as the repointing of block joints with sand and lime instead of mortar. Work was completed in 2026 and cost an estimated €5.5 million.

== Burials ==
- Patrick Mulligan (1912–1990), Bishop of Clogher

== See also ==
List of cathedrals in Ireland
