= Peadar Livingstone =

Irish Roman Catholic priest

Fr. Peadar Livingstone (1932 – 8 December 1987) was a Roman Catholic priest in the Diocese of Clogher, Ireland.

== Early life and education ==
Peadar Livingstone was born in 1932 and raised in Castleblayney, County Monaghan. His father was a jeweller. He entered St. Macartan's College, Monaghan, in 1945. Following his secondary school education, he entered Maynooth College to study for the priesthood for the diocese. He studied Celtic languages — Irish and Welsh. He then completed a second degree in theology. He was ordained a priest in 1957. Fr. Livingstone continued his studies at Maynooth; however, he was recalled to the diocese in 1957 before he completed his Higher Diploma in Education.

== Teaching career ==
He was appointed to the teaching staff of St. Michael's College in Enniskillen, a diocesan seminary in County Fermanagh. At St. Michael's, he taught Irish, history and religious education.

Fr. Livingstone was a renowned scholar in both the Irish language and local history. In 1969, he published The Fermanagh Story, a comprehensive history of the county of Fermanagh. In 1979, his work The Monaghan Story was published. He also wrote a regular column for The Fermanagh Herald, a local newspaper, under the name "Ernesense."

In 1977, Fr. Livingstone was appointed president of St. Michael's College where he introduced some disciplinary measures, including mandatory uniforms.

== Parish Ministry ==
He was appointed a curate to the parish of Donaghmoyne in 1977. In 1987, he was assigned to the parish of Clogher in County Tyrone where he died suddenly that year.
