= Lawrence Duffy =

Irish Roman Catholic prelate (born 1951)

The Most Reverend Lawrence Duffy
- Bishop of Clogher
- Church: Roman Catholic
- Diocese: Clogher
- Appointed: 8 December 2018
- Installed: 10 February 2019
- Predecessor: Liam MacDaid
- Previous posts: Vicar general and dean of the chapter of canons of the Diocese of Clogher; Parish priest of Carrickmacross, Clones and Ederney

Orders
- Ordination: 13 June 1976 by Patrick Mulligan
- Consecration: 10 February 2019 by Eamon Martin

Personal details
- Born: 27 November 1951 (age 74) Magheracloone, County Monaghan, Ireland
- Parents: Thomas and Elizabeth Duffy
- Education: St. Patrick's, Carlow College
- Motto: God is love

Styles of Lawrence Duffy
- Reference style: The Most Reverend
- Spoken style: Your Grace
- Religious style: Bishop

Lawrence "Larry" Duffy (born 27 November 1951) is an Irish Roman Catholic prelate who has served as Bishop of Clogher since 2019.

== Early life and education ==
Duffy was born on 27 November 1951 in Magheracloone, County Monaghan, one of five children to Thomas and Elizabeth Duffy. In his youth, he played Gaelic football for Magheracloone Mitchells.

Duffy attended primary school at Ballynagearn National School and secondary school at the Patrician High School, Carrickmacross, before studying for the priesthood at St Patrick's, Carlow College.

He was ordained a priest for the Diocese of Clogher on 13 June 1976.

== Presbyteral ministry ==
Following ordination, Duffy's first pastoral assignment was as curate in Enniskillen. He was subsequently appointed curate in Castleblayney in 1978, and the cathedral parish in Monaghan in 1994.

Between 1998 and 2002, Duffy was a missionary in the Diocese of Kitui, Kenya, during which time he helped to lead the construction of a church in Mwingi and supported religious communities in constructing schools in the diocese.

He returned to the Diocese of Clogher in 2003, when he was appointed parish priest in Ederney. Duffy was subsequently appointed parish priest in Clones in 2008, and in Carrickmacross in 2013. Prior to his episcopal appointment, he had also served as administrator in his native parish of Magheracloone, vicar general of the diocese between 2013 and 2016, and also as dean of the diocesan chapter of canons.

== Episcopal ministry ==
Duffy was appointed Bishop-elect of Clogher by Pope Francis on 8 December 2018. The appointment was seen as unusual as, at that time, new bishops in Ireland tended to be appointed from without their native diocese, rather than within.

He received episcopal ordination from the Archbishop of Armagh and Primate of All Ireland, Eamon Martin, on 10 February 2019 in St Macartan's Cathedral, Monaghan.

In an interview with The Irish Times on 15 October 2020, Duffy spoke of the frustration felt by people in his diocese who could attend public Mass in parishes within Northern Ireland during the COVID-19 pandemic, but not in the Republic of Ireland. In an interview with The Irish Catholic on 22 October 2020, he stated his belief that the restriction on public prayer during Level 3 restrictions in the Republic of Ireland was "severe".

Bishop Duffy has initiated a series of pastoral reforms aimed at coping with the falling number of priests in his diocese. In 2023 he observed "the figures given to us indicate that if we continue as we are, in less than 20 years there will be fewer than 10 priests covering the 85 churches across the whole diocese" and, consequently, has encouraged the development of new ministries for lay people including at a time of funerals and bereavement.

He has also introduced the permanent diaconate into his diocese and welcomed Kenyan priests to minister in Clogher.
