= Eugene O'Callaghan =

Irish bishop (1888-1973)

The Most Reverend Eugene O'Callaghan
- Bishop of Clogher
- Church: Roman Catholic Church
- See: Clogher
- In office: 4 April 1943 – 28 November 1969
- Predecessor: Patrick McKenna
- Successor: Patrick Mulligan

Personal details
- Born: 7 January 1888 Camlough, County Armagh, Ireland,
- Died: 21 May 1973 (aged 85)

Eugene O'Callaghan (7 January 1888 – 21 May 1973) was a Roman Catholic bishop.

== Early life and education ==
O'Callaghan was born in Errigal and educated at St Macartan's College, Monaghan and St Patrick's College, Maynooth. He was ordained priest on 21 June 1913 for service in the Archdiocese of Armagh. His first appointment was curate in the city of Armagh and eventually he became Administrator of the Cathedral Parish of Armagh. While in that role he was responsible for building the additional church of St. Malachy. He was named parish priest of St. Peter's parish in Drogheda in 1938.

== Bishop of Clogher ==
He was appointed the Roman Catholic Bishop of Clogher in Ireland on 30 January 1943, following the death of Dr. Patrick McKenna, on 7 February 1942 and received episcopal consecration on 4 April 1943. His Episcopal Motto was Ad Jesum per Mariam (To Jesus through Mary.)

In 1957 he denounced the IRA border campaign arguing that physical force would only aggravate the division not bring a solution.

As was common with many Catholic bishops in Ireland at the time, one of his main pastoral priorities was education and specifically the provision of new schools to meet rising social demands. As bishop of a cross-border diocese, O'Callaghan had to operate within two jurisdictions but one academic and reviewer considers this Bishop O'Callaghan‘s "biggest achievement". O'Callaghan was responsible for the creation of St Michael's College, Enniskillen as a diocesan college, taking over the school from the Presentation Brothers and establishing it on a new site just outside the Fermanagh town.

He attended the opening session of the Second Vatican Council in October 1962.

He resigned this appointment on 26 January 1971 in accordance with newly adopted protocols for the style of retired bishops in the post-Vatican II era and died as Bishop Emeritus of Clogher on 21 May 1973. O'Callaghan was succeeded by Patrick Mulligan. He is buried in the grounds of his Cathedral alongside his predecessor.

== See also ==
- Roman Catholic Diocese of Clogher

Catholic Church titles
Preceded by Patrick McKenna	Bishop of Clogher; 1943 – 1969	Succeeded by Patrick Mulligan
