= St Michael's College, Enniskillen =

St Michael's College Coláiste Mhíchíl

Location
- Chanterhill Road, Enniskillen; Northern Ireland; 54.349°N 7.626°W

Information
- School type: Grammar School
- Motto: Orare Studere Agere (Latin for to pray, to study, to act)
- Patron saint: Michael the Archangel
- Established: 1903
- Principal: Cathal O’Connor
- Chaplain: James McLoughlin
- Enrollment: 695
- Colours: Claret and light blue
- Publication: Arís
- Website: saintmichaels.org.uk

St Michael's College (Irish: Coláiste Mhíchíl) is a Roman Catholic boys' grammar school located in Enniskillen, Northern Ireland.

Named for St Michael the Archangel, the school educates boys in County Fermanagh and the surrounding areas. The school is located within the parish of Enniskillen, one of the largest parishes in the Diocese of Clogher. The school's feast day is 29 September. The current principal is Cathal O’Connor (2025–present).

== Location ==
The college is situated on Drumclay Hill, about half a mile from Enniskillen town centre. It is built on an elevated site and enjoys a view of the Mill Lough, Cuilcagh Mountain, Topped Mountain and the surrounding countryside.

== History ==
St Michael's Grammar School was established to cater for the educational needs of Catholic boys from the northern half of the Diocese of Clogher. From 1903 until 1957, St Michael's was run by the Presentation Brothers at its Belmore Street site, where The Clinton Centre now stands. It was then taken over by the diocese under the then Bishop of Clogher, the Most Rev Eugene O'Callaghan and rebuilt at Drumclay.

In 1952, the site was purchased by Monsignor Patrick Gannon. During the summer of 1956, Patrick Mulligan was appointed to run the college. Work on the grammar school started in 1958; during that time, classes were held at the original location on East Bridge Street.

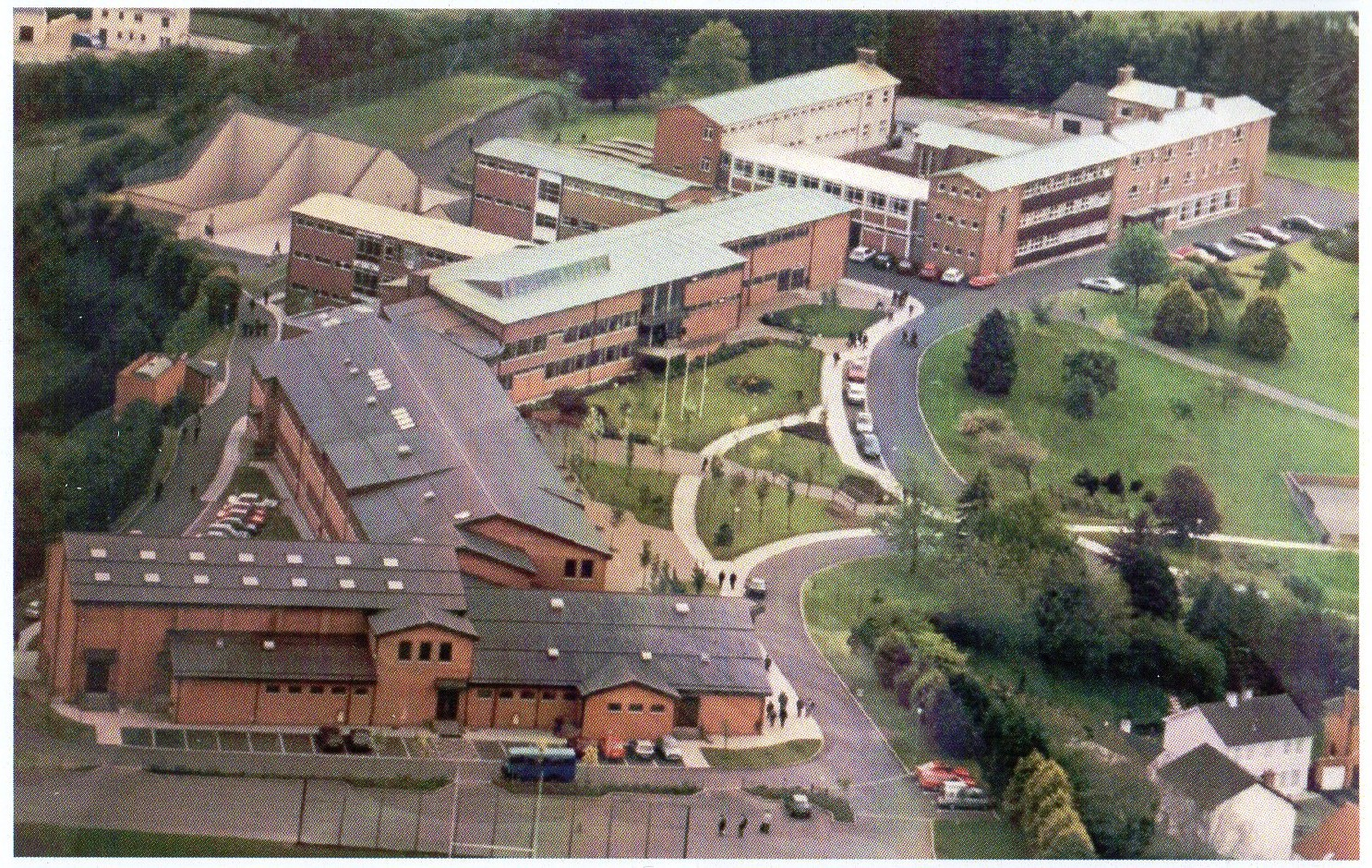
Drumclay Hill after the 1993 extension to the college.

In September 1963, the buildings were completed and all classes were moved from East Bridge Street to Drumclay. The college has undergone extensive development and expansion since that time. The original site was expanded in the late 1950s to accommodate an increase in the number of students from 200 to 300. Boarding facilities were available for about 60 boys. The next expansion occurred in 1966, with the addition of four new classrooms, including a modern language department, laboratory, a bookstore and a teachers' recreation room. In more recent years, a new technology block has been added, and many of the science labs have been renovated. Since its foundation, the college has continued to grow and expand. It now has over 700 students, a teaching staff of 50 and a support staff of 35.

However the school has also experienced a sharp academic decline, with the college being the worst performing grammar school in Northern Ireland in 2016, and consistently ranks near the bottom in grammar school exam performance. In April 2025 the Council for Catholic Maintained Schools (CCMS) announced plans for St Michael's‚ and St Joseph's College, Enniskillen to be amalgamated on the closure of St Joseph's in early 2027‚ 'declining pupil numbers was one of the key reasons behind the proposed closures.' The school will then not use academic selection criteria as part of their admission process. In September 2025 it was reported the Police Service of Northern Ireland have conducted a four month police investigation into a series of "severe bullying incidents" at St Michael's. The school has been accused of having an out-of-date anti-bullying policy which is not publicly available. As the school has not dealt with the issues Social Services Department of Health (Northern Ireland), the Education Authority and PSNI are now involved. In 2026 the school received continued criticism from notable past pupils who detailed both bias on the provided education, lack of adequate career guidance and a legacy of historical bullying at the school particularly from the clergy. In response, the priest in question who 'was at the school in the 1970s and 1980s' refused to comment while the Diocese of Clogher referred complaints to its Safeguarding Office.

The school has also had to manage severe reputational damage in its past due to clerical sexual abuse by Father John McCabe and the former Principal Canon Patrick McEntee. Former teacher, priest and convicted child abuser Father John McCabe was jailed in 1995 on 13 sex offences. McCabe taught at the school from 1977 until 1988. Despite being aware of this abuse in 1989 these events were covered up by the then Bishop of Clogher and chairman of the St Michael's board of governors Joseph Duffy who failed to report the crimes to police, social services or the school McCabe was subsequently employed at after leaving St.Michaels. Duffy has a history of not dealing with sexual abuse in the Diocese.

Patrick McEntee was jailed for seven years in 2025 on eight counts of sexual abuse of four children, all pupils at the school. In 2025 the Bishop of Clogher Lawrence Duffy and the Diocese of Clogher on behalf of the schools Board of Governors issued a formal apology to victims of sexual abuse perpetrated at the college by McEntee who was convicted of sexual abuse at Dungannon Crown Court on the 11th June 2025 However contrary to the Bishop's statement in which he stated "that this news will also come as a shock to the parishioners of Dromore, Co Tyrone, and to the community of St Michael's College, Enniskillen" McEntee's behaviour and predilections were always common knowledge at the school. McEntee, described as "predatory paedophile" by Judge Richard Green when being sentenced, was convicted on charges against four children over various dates between 1978 and 1989. The PSNI encouraged further victims to come forward reiterating that McEntee "is a highly manipulative individual" stating “McEntee is a child predator who used his position to take advantage of young boys who trusted him,” He operated unchecked at the school from 1977 until 2000 and remained on the Board of Governors until 2021.

== St Michael's College presidents ==
Since the college was taken over by the diocese in 1957, a total of six priests have taken up the role of college president. In 2006, Eugene McCullough was the first lay person appointed to lead the college. Patrick Mulligan, a native of County Fermanagh, was the first president of the college and served in the post for nine years. He oversaw the planning and building of the college at Drumclay as well as its first two expansions.

Less than three years after his retirement from the post, he was appointed Bishop of Clogher. He resigned that position in 1979 due to ill health and died in 1991. The second principal was John McElroy, also a native of County Fermanagh, who remained in the post until 1977. One of his students was future president, Joseph McGuinness. McElroy later became parish priest of Aghalurcher, near Lisnaskea; he died in 2004.

Years	Name
1957–1966	Patrick Mulligan
1966–1977	John McElroy
1977	Peadar Livingstone
1978–1994	Macartan McQuaid
1994–2000	Patrick McEntee
2000–2006	Joseph McGuinness
2006–2016	Eugene McCullough
2016–2025	Mark Henry
2025–present	Cathal O’Connor

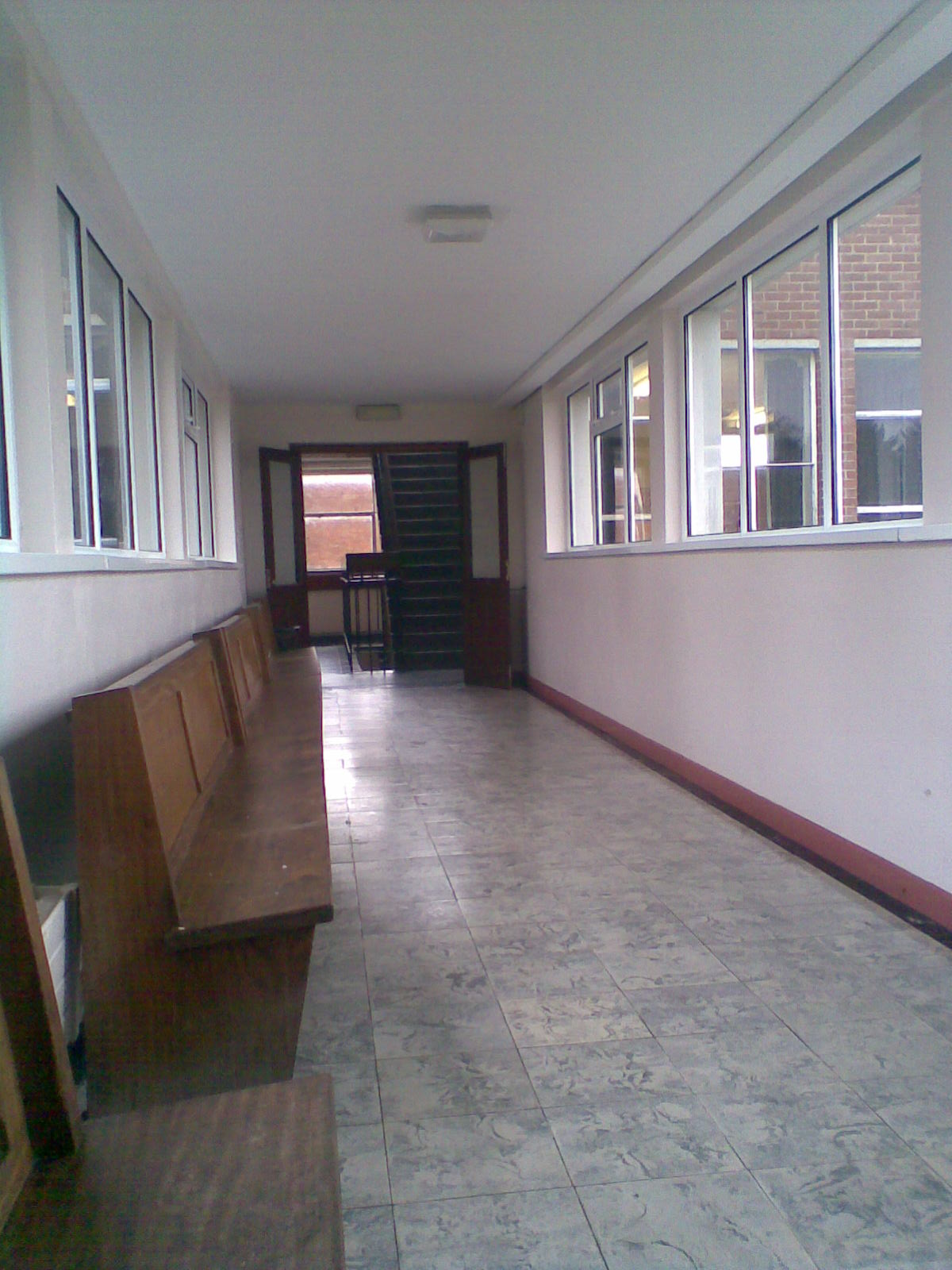
A small corridor in the school leading to the year 14 studyhall

In 1977, Peadar Livingstone briefly held the position of president, before assuming parish duties in Broomfield, County Monaghan, near his native Castleblayney. By the time he took up the post, he was already known for his local historical work, The Fermanagh Story; he completed The Monaghan Story in 1980. He was succeeded at the end of the year by Macartan McQuaid, also a native of County Monaghan.

Macartan McQuaid became president in January 1978 and was the longest serving president of St Michael's College from the 1970s, through the 1980s until the early 1990s. During his tenure, McQuaid oversaw major extension work at the college while the number of students attending the school gradually grew from 500 to over 700. McQuaid retired in 1993, and was appointed parish priest of Irvinestown. He returned as chaplain in 2007. McQuaids time at St Michael's was marred with the historic sexual abuse, by both Fr John McCabe and Canon Patrick McEntee, that occurred during his time as President. McQuaid shared 'private quarters' at the school with both McCabe and McEntee who all resided on site as residential staff who were responsible 24/7 for the safety, welfare and pastoral care of boarding pupils.

In 1994, convicted paedophile Patrick McEntee, a native of the town of Monaghan, assumed the position of president. McEntee originally joined the staff of the college in 1977 with his appointment as dean. He resigned as president in 2000 but remained on the schools Board of Governors until 2021 He became a parish priest in Dromore in 2000 where he remained until March 2023 when he was placed on leave while an investigation into historical Safeguarding took place. MacEntee was charged with indecently assaulting a complainant between 1980 and 1981 and further alleged to have twice indecently assaulted a second complainant on dates between 1988 and 1989. McEntee's case was referred to the Crown Court and "is understood they relate to Canon McEntee’s time in County Fermanagh." McEntee was to stand trial on historical sexual assault charges in September 2024. In July 2024 MacEntee was additionally accused of a further four counts of indecent assault against three males alleged to have occurred on various dates between 1978 and 1987. McEntee was charged with sexual offences against five children, males who attended St Michael’s College. McEntee's trial at Dungannon Crown Court commenced 20 May 2025. The case referred to McEntees "pattern of sexualised behaviour" towards the children and how the priest took the boys into his private quarters at the school McEntee was found unanimously guilty of eight counts of historical indecent assault against four children at Dungannon Crown Court on June 11, 2025. McEntee was remanded in custody and ordered to sign the Sex-Offender Register ahead of sentencing in September 2025. Judge Richard Greene told McEntee that he would face a "significant custodial sentence". McEntee returned to court in September and the case was adjourned before sentencing on 12 September 2025 McEntee was jailed for 7 years on the 12th September 2025. McEntee presents a risk of reoffending and will be on the sex offenders register for the rest of his life. Judge Green described McEntee as a "predatory paedophile" McEntee's appeal against the conviction and sentence was delayed in June 2026 when his legal team withdrew from representing him

MacEntee was succeed in September 2000 by Joseph McGuinness, originally from Lisnaskea in County Fermanagh, and the first pupil of the college to become president. McGuinness retired as president in August 2006. In September 2007, he was appointed to the position of parish priest of Enniskillen. The school's first lay principal, Eugene J. McCullough, took up his post on 1 September 2006. Mccullough, educated in County Antrim, is the former president of St Mary's College, Irvinestown, County Fermanagh. McCullough retired in 2016 after ten years as principal.

Mark Henry was appointed to be the new principal of the college in September 2016. Henry began teaching at St Michael's in 1995 and went on to become the vice-principal in 2007. Henry exited the role in February 2025.

Cathal O’Connor was confirmed as principal in March 2025. O'Connor had been a teacher in the College for 22 years as well as being a former pupil of the school.

== Sports ==
The school places a high emphasis on sport with a particular priority on Gaelic Football. In 2006, St Michael's won the Rannafast Cup.

=== MacRory Cup ===
The school's teams have won the MacRory Cup 7 times, making St. Michael's the 6th most successful college in the competition's history. After wins in 1973 and 1992, the school entered its most successful spell in 1999, reaching the final in four consecutive years, winning in 1999, 2001 and 2002. The school again lifted the trophy in 2012, beating St Patrick's College, Maghera in the final by 0–09 to 1–04. Seven years later, St. Michael's won on Monday 18 March 2019 when they beat Omagh CBS 0–16 to 2–6 at the athletic grounds in Armagh.

St Michael's lost in the competition final on seven (7) occasions, most recently the 2008 final. The team qualified for the final with a win of 1–17 to 0–7 over St Eunan's, Letterkenny, before being defeated by St Patrick's Academy, Dungannon, in the final on Monday, 17 March (St Patrick's Day) 2008.

The team entered into the 2008 Hogan Cup semi-final against St Colman's College, Claremorris on 30 March, winning 2–13 to 1–10, progressing to their third Hogan Cup final. On Saturday 6 April 2019, St. Michael's claimed their first ever Hogan Cup (an all-Ireland title) in Croke Park with a one-point victory over Naas CBS (1–12 to 1–11).

=== Run For Oisin ===
St Michael's organise an annual run around the grounds of the school in memory of Oisin McGrath, a past pupil of the school, who died in a playground incident. This run raises money for the Oisin McGrath Foundation.

== Notable former pupils ==
- Dominic Corrigan (b. 1961/1962) — Gaelic footballer, also taught at the college
- Tomás Corrigan (b. 1990), — Gaelic footballer, son of Dominic
- T.P. Flanagan (1929–2011) — artist
- Frank McManus (b. 1942) — independent Nationalist MP for Fermanagh and South Tyrone (1970–1974)
- Frank Ormsby (b. 1947) — poet and former editor of The Honest Ulsterman
- Sir Patrick Hugh Haren (b. 1950) — businessman (Viridian Group); knighted for services to the electricity industry in Northern Ireland
- Fearghal McKinney (b. 1962) — television presenter, journalist and politician
- Nigel McLoughlin (b. 1968) — writer, poet, academic (University of Gloucestershire)
- Ciarán McMenamin (b. 1975) — actor
- Martin McGrath (born 1981) — Gaelic footballer
- Phil Flanagan (b. 1984) — Sinn Féin Fermanagh and South Tyrone MLA
- Barry Owens - Two time All-Star

== See also ==
- Diocese of Clogher
- Patrick Mulligan first College President and Bishop of Clogher
