= Nigel McLoughlin =

Northern Irish poet

- Born: 1968 (age 57–58); Enniskillen, Northern Ireland
- Education: University of London (BA); University of Ulster (Diploma); Lancaster University (MA, PhD); University of Bristol (MSc); University of Nottingham (MA)
- Occupations: Poet, editor, professor
- Employer: University of Gloucestershire

Nigel McLoughlin (born 1968) is a poet, editor and teacher.

== Early life and education ==
Nigel McLoughlin was born in 1968 in Enniskillen, Northern Ireland. He received his early education at St Michael's College, Enniskillen. He holds a BA(Hons) in English from the University of London and a Diploma in Irish Language from the University of Ulster. In 2000, he was awarded an MA with Distinction in Creative Writing (Poetry) and in 2004 a PhD in Creative Writing both from Lancaster University. He also holds an MSc in neuropsychology from the University of Bristol and an MA in Literary Linguistics from the University of Nottingham.

== Poetry ==
His first collection, At The Waters' Clearing, was published jointly by Flambard and Black Mountain Presses in 2001 and a second collection, Songs For No Voices, was published in 2004 by Lagan Press. A third collection, Blood, was published by Bluechrome in 2005 and a fourth, Dissonances, followed in 2007.

His latest collection, Chora: New & Selected Poems, was published by Templar Poetry in 2009. McLoughlin's work has received widespread critical approval from its reviewers most notably in PN Review, London Magazine, Poetry Ireland, Envoi, and Fortnight.

His work has twice been short-listed for the prestigious Hennessy Award, placed in the equally competitive Kavanagh Awards and The New Writer Poetry Prizes. He has read his work at the Cheltenham Literature Festival in 2009, Ledbury Poetry Festival in 2007 and at the Dublin International Writers Festival in 2005 among many others. In 2014 his work was added to The Poetry Archive.

== Professional work ==
He edits the literary journal Iota. He has previously edited the academic journal Creative Writing: Teaching Theory & Practice.

He published the The Portable Poetry Workshop in 2016.

McLoughlin has been awarded Fellowship of the Higher Education Academy and elected a Fellow of the RSA. In 2026 he is Professor of Creativity & Poetics at the University of Gloucestershire. He was awarded a University Teaching Fellowship in 2009 and a National Teaching Fellowship in 2011.
