= Roman Catholic Diocese of Clogher =

Latin Catholic diocese in Ireland

Coordinates: 54.2447°N 6.9580°W

Diocese of Clogher Dioecesis Clogheriensis Deoise Chlochair

Catholic
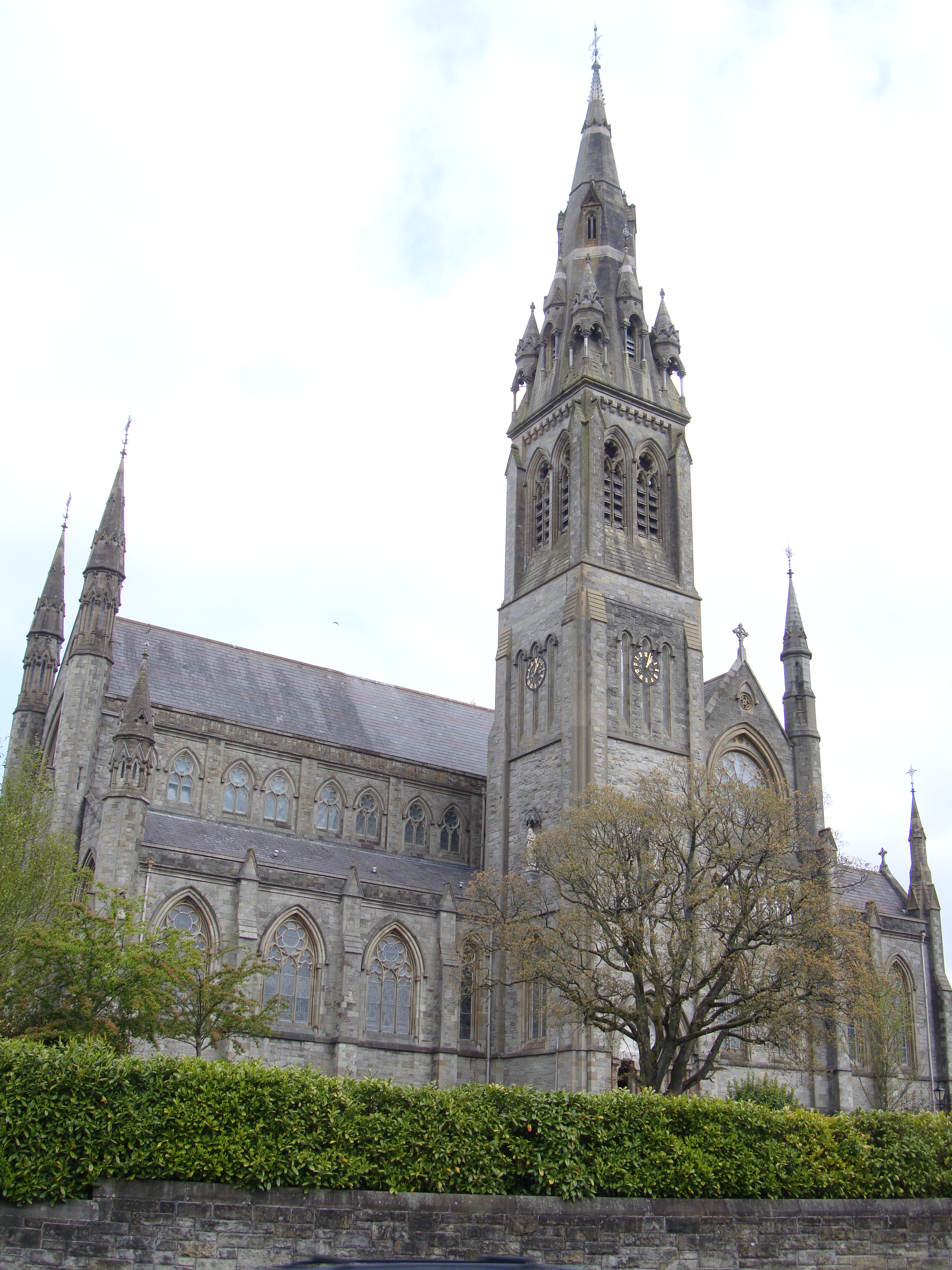
- St Macartan's Cathedral, Monaghan

Location
- Country: Northern Ireland; Republic of Ireland
- Territory: County Monaghan, most of County Fermanagh and parts of counties Tyrone, Donegal, Louth and Cavan; partly in the Republic of Ireland and partly in Northern Ireland
- Ecclesiastical province: Province of Armagh

Statistics
- Area: 1,334 sq mi (3,460 km^{2})
- Population: Total; Catholics: (as of 2022); 56,700; 115,000 (49.3%)
- Parishes: 37
- Churches: 89

Information
- Denomination: Catholic
- Sui iuris church: Latin Church
- Rite: Roman Rite
- Cathedral: St Macartan's Cathedral, Monaghan
- Patron saint: St Macartan
- Secular priests: 72

Current leadership
- Pope: Leo XIV
- Bishop: Lawrence Duffy
- Metropolitan Archbishop: Eamon Martin
- Bishops emeritus: Joseph Duffy, Bishop Emeritus of Clogher

Map
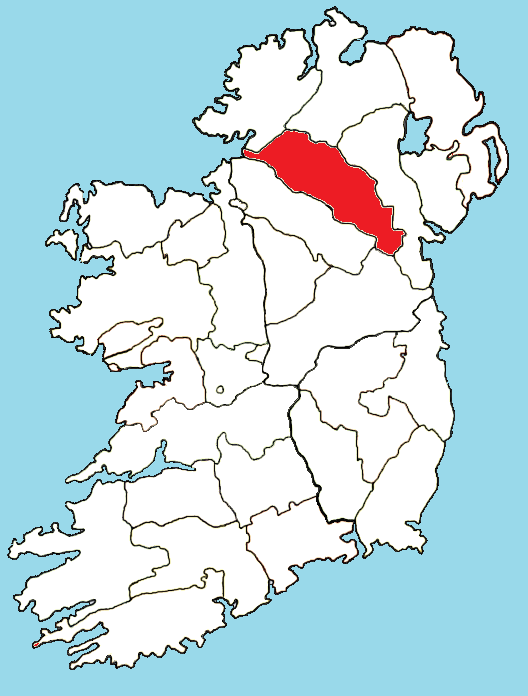

Website
- clogherdiocese.ie

The Diocese of Clogher (Latin: Dioecesis Clogheriensis, Irish: Deoise Chlochair; /ˈklɔː.ər/, /ˈklɒ.hər/) is a Latin Church diocese of the Catholic Church in Ireland. It was formed in 1111 at the Synod of Rathbreasail as the see for the Kingdom of Uí Chremthainn. It is part of the Province of Armagh.

The original cathedral was in the village of Clogher in County Tyrone, site of a monastery founded in 454 by St. Macartan, who was appointed bishop by St. Patrick in the 5th century. Following the Reformation, Henry VIII confiscated Clogher Cathedral for his Church of Ireland and the Roman Catholic diocese was without a permanent see until 1851 when a decision was made to move to the larger town of Monaghan, 32 kilometres south east of Clogher village. The foundation stone of a St Macartan's Cathedral was laid in Monaghan in June 1861. The cathedral was dedicated in August 1892.

Today the diocese has a congregation of over 100,000 parishioners spread across 37 parishes. The current bishop is the Most Reverend Lawrence Duffy, who was appointed by the Holy See on 8 December 2018 and ordained bishop on 10 February 2019.

== Geography ==
The Diocese straddles the Irish border, consisting of County Monaghan, much of County Fermanagh and parts of Counties Tyrone and Donegal. The largest towns are Bundoran, Carrickmacross, Castleblayney, Clones, Enniskillen, Lisnaskea and Monaghan.

== Domnach Airgid ==
The shrine of the diocese, known as the Domnach Airgid originally housed a copy of the Gospels and the Cross of the Clogher Diocese. According to tradition, these were originally given to St. Macartan by St. Patrick, although the manuscript as it exists today dates from the eighth century. Today these relics of ecclesiastical art held are at the National Museum of Ireland in Dublin.

== Principal Saints of the Diocese ==
- St Macartan of Clogher
- St Tiarnach of Clones
- St Molaise of Devenish
- St Davóg of Lough Derg
- St Davnet of Sliabh Beagh
- St Maoldoid of Muckno
- St Fanchea of Rossory

== Parishes of the Diocese ==
Number	Name	Location
1	Pettigo	Donegal
2	Culmaine	Fermanagh
3	Dromore	Tyrone
4	Magh Ene	Donegal
5	Inis Muighe Samh	Fermanagh
6	Botha	Fermanagh
7	Devenish	Fermanagh
8	Kilskeery	Fermanagh/Tyrone
9	Donacavey	Tyrone
10	Eskra	Tyrone
11	Clogher	Tyrone
12	Aghavea-Aughintaine	Fermanagh/Tyrone
13	Pobal	Fermanagh
14	Enniskillen	Fermanagh
15	Cleenish	Fermanagh
16	Aghalurcher	Fermanagh
17	Galloon	Fermanagh
18	Clones	Fermanagh/Monaghan
19	Roslea	Fermanagh/Monaghan
20	Tydavnet	Monaghan
21	Errigal Truagh	Monaghan
22	Donagh	Monaghan
23	Tyholland	Monaghan
24	Monaghan & Rackwallace	Monaghan
25	Kilmore & Drumsnat	Monaghan
26	Currin, Killeevan & Aghabog	Monaghan
27	Ematris	Monaghan
28	Tullycorbet	Monaghan
29	Clontibret	Monaghan
30	Aughnamullan West	Monaghan
31	Aughnamullan East	Monaghan
32	Muckno	Monaghan
33	Donaghmoyne	Monaghan
34	Inniskeen	Monaghan/Louth
35	Machaire Rois	Monaghan
36	Killanny	Monaghan/Louth
37	Magheracloone	Monaghan

== Sexual abuse ==
In 2011 London-based law firm Jeff Anderson-Ann Olivarius Law (now AO Advocates) said they were to take action in Minnesota against a retired priest from the Clogher diocese who was moved to the US in the 1980s. Also in 2011 a Nevada clerical abuse survivor sued the diocese, claiming that Father Francis Markey, who had been suspended three times by the diocese of Clogher between the years 1964 and 1974 due to allegations of sexually abusing children. According to the lawsuit he was sent for treatment each time and then reinstated into the priesthood, before eventually being moved to Nevada. In that same year the Sunday Business Post newspaper reported that the Bishop, Joseph Duffy, had admitted both to failing to pass abuse claims to police in 1989, and to being party to victims and families being made to sign oaths of non-disclosure. Duffy was summoned to the Vatican in 2010 for a meeting with Benedict XVI to discuss what prior knowledge he had about allegations of sexual abuse of children against clergy members within Clogher diocese. A separate case in the 1970s and 1980s involved Bishop Duffy's uncle, Canon Peter Joe Duffy, who abused at least three victims. The abuse came to light in 2013 and the diocese paid compensation. Other priests of the diocese involved in abuse of children include Fr. Eugene Lewis (jailed for four years on eleven counts of indecent assault); Fr. John McCabe (20 months imprisonment on abuse charges) and Fr Jeremiah McGrath, described by the Belfast Telegraph as "the very antithesis of what a priest should be. A lying, manipulative facilitator for a vicious paedophile": jailed for five years in 2007 for indecently assaulting a 12-year-old girl and facilitating another person to rape her whilst working in North West England after spending time in the diocese of Clogher.

In 2013 a report from the Church's own investigatory body reported a total of 45 allegations against 13 priests in the diocese between 1975 and 2012, and identified unsatisfactory responses to complaints, failure to address risky behaviour and the missing of preventative opportunities. Retired bishop Joseph Duffy accepted the criticism. However, the Report did acknowledge that current procedures for dealing with allegations of abuse in the diocese had improved significantly and it praised Bishop MacDaid's approach to the issue.

In 2025 the Bishop of Clogher Lawrence Duffy issued a formal apology to victims of sexual abuse perpetrated at St Michael's College, Enniskillen by paedophile Canon Patrick McEntee who was convicted of sexual abuse at Dungannon Crown Court on the 11th June 2025 and jailed for seven years. However contrary to the Bishop's statement in which he stated "that this news will also come as a shock to the parishioners of Dromore, Co Tyrone, and to the community of St Michael's College, Enniskillen" McEntee's behaviour and predilections were always common knowledge at the school.

== Clerical Shortage ==
As with many Irish Catholic Dioceses, Clogher has suffered from a severe clerical shortage in the 21st-century. In December 2023 Bishop Duffy announced that the diocese would start training 40 laymen and laywomen to preside over funerals given the few number of priests. In 2022 the diocese had 72 priests and deacons but it is estimated that by 2040 that number could be as low as 10.

== Ordinaries ==
The following is a list of the ten most recent appointments.

- Edward Kernan (1824–1844)
- Charles McNally (1844–1864)
- James Donnelly (1864–1893)
- Richard Owens (1894–1909)
- Patrick McKenna (1909–1942)
- Eugene O'Callaghan (1943–1969)
- Patrick Mulligan (1969–1979)
- Joseph Duffy (1979–2010)
- Liam MacDaid (2010–2016)
- Lawrence Duffy (2018– )

== See also ==
- Roman Catholicism in Ireland
- List of Roman Catholic dioceses in Northern Ireland
- Apostolic Nuncio to Ireland
