= St Macartan's College =

St. Macartan's College
- Monaghan (Mullamurphy)

Information
- Type: Diocesan College
- Motto: Fortis et Fidelis; Strong and faithful
- Established: 1840; 186 years ago
- Principal: David McCague
- Enrollment: 770
- Colours: Amber (colour) and Black
- Website: stmacartanscollege.ie

St. Macartan's College is a Roman Catholic boys' Diocesan College in Monaghan, Ireland. It is named after Saint Macartan, follower of St. Patrick and founder and bishop of the Diocese of Clogher. The school educates Catholic boys in County Monaghan and surrounding counties. It is located within the parish of Donagh. The school Feast Day is 24 March.

== History ==
The foundation stone for St. Macartan's College was laid on 8 July 1840. Eight years later the "Sem" opened its doors to its first students, and for over a century-and-a-half the school has adapted itself to meet the educational needs of boys in the North Monaghan and surrounding areas. The school complex has at its heart a grand seventeen-bay stone building. It is in the Georgian style and was designed by the Newry-born architect Thomas Duff in the 1830s. The building has a chapel, a collection of antiquities and a clock tower and includes a large lunch canteen, which was formerly used as a refectory for the school's boarders. In recent years the college has changed from being predominantly a boarding school to a day school catering to its 770 students, and has been enlarged to accommodate them.

== Administration and curriculum ==
Situated in North Monaghan, on the edge of Monaghan town, St. Macartan's College is a post-primary school for boys.

The school educates boys from 12 to 18 years old. In the Junior Cycle (11–15 years old) the curriculum includes Civic, Social and Political Education, English, Geography, History, Irish, Mathematics, Physical Education, Religious Education, Science and Social, Personal and Health Education. The students also choose two subjects from the following five: Art, Technology, Business Studies, Music, Materials Technology and Technical Graphics. Also, each student must pick a third language (apart from Irish and English) to learn during the Junior Cycle. They get the choice of either French or German. The students sit the Junior Certificate Examination at the end of their third year. The Junior Certificate is used to assess students' talents and abilities, which will be taken into account as they progress to the senior cycle.

After the Junior Certificate, the students enter the transition year programme followed by the Leaving Certificate (3-Year) or go directly into the Leaving Certificate Applied programme (2-Year). The Leaving Cert applied programme (LCA) caters for only around twenty students and does not provide the same qualifications as the Leaving Certificate.

In the final two years the main emphasis is on preparation for the Leaving Certificate. Each student studies Irish, English, Mathematics, Religious Education and Physical Education. Each also chooses four optional subjects from French, German, Construction Studies, Business Studies, Art, Economics, Physics, Biology, Accounting, Chemistry, History, Technical Drawing and Geography.

== Crest ==
The crest of St. Macartan's College, as seen in the front hall of the school, was designed by the artist Richard J. King, for the centenary celebrations of 1940. It is modelled on the front panels of the circular boss of the Cross of Clogher, the 14th-century treasure, now on loan from the Diocese of Clogher to Monaghan County Museum. The panels contain the interlaced letters DEUS (God), and, underneath, the motto of the college, Fortis et Fidelis.

The words "Fortis et Fidelis" (Strong and Faithful) suggest a Pauline quotation from 1 Cor 16:13. They evoke the legend of St. Mac Cairthinn, the tréanfhear of Patrick, the bodyguard and champion of the Saint who used to carry him across fords and rivers on his missionary journeys. The words occur in one of the last letters of Father Cornelius Tierney, a former student and priest-teacher in St. Macartan's, and later a Columban missionary who died a prisoner of Communist guerillas in China in 1931.

== Sports ==
St. Macartan's offers a number of sports and competes in the MacRory Cup, the Rannafast Cup, Corn na Og, the Dalton Cup and has programs in golf, soccer, handball, basketball and general athletics.

St. Macartan's won the Senior Ulster Colleges MacLarnon Cup on 17 March 1987, beating Armagh C.B.S. 0-12 to 0-4. That team went on to win the All Ireland against St. Michaels Listowel, Kerry on 2 May 1987.

The school reached the MacRory Cup final in 2004. This was repeated in 2007 when they lost by a single point.

== Student Council ==
St. Macartan's has a student council where members are elected to represent the views of the student body and to communicate these to the management and teachers of the college. A student council formed recently, when it became obligatory under law for such an organisation to exist in every secondary school. Before this, no such council existed.

== Past Pupils ==
- James J. Drumm, battery train innovator, 1897–1974
- Joseph Duffy – Bishop of Clogher, 1979-2010
- Páraic Duffy – former Director-General of the GAA, in 1996 was first lay principal of the college.
- John Murphy Farley – Archbishop of New York, 1902-1918
- Patrick McCabe - writer who was twice shortlisted for the Booker Prize (for The Butcher Boy and Breakfast on Pluto)
- Patrick McKenna – Bishop of Clogher, 1909-1942
- James Joseph MacNamee Bishop of Ardagh and Clonmacnoise, 1927-1966
- Liam MacDaid – former Bishop of Clogher, 2010–2016; and played intercounty football for Donegal
- Patrick Mulligan - Bishop of Clogher, 1970-1979
- Richard Owens - Bishop of Clogher, 1894-1909

== See also ==
- Diocese of Clogher
