= R185 road (Ireland) =

Road in Ireland

R185 road
- Bóthar R185

Route information
- Length: 9.5 km (5.9 mi)

Location
- Country: Ireland
- Primary destinations: County Monaghan; leaves the N12 road near Tyholland; Glaslough; Terminates at the Republic of Ireland–United Kingdom border

Highway system
- Roads in Ireland; Motorways; Primary; Secondary; Regional

The R185 road is a regional road in Ireland linking the N12 near Tyholland in County Monaghan and the border with Northern Ireland. The road passes through the village of Glaslough. Across the border, it continues as an unclassified route towards the villages of Tynan and Caledon.

The road is 9.5 km (5.9 mi) long.

== See also ==
- Roads in Ireland
- National primary road
- National secondary road
