= Joseph Duffy (bishop) =

Irish bishop

The Most Reverend Joseph Duffy
- Bishop-Emeritus of Clogher
- See: Clogher
- Appointed: 7 July 1979
- Installed: 2 September 1979
- Term ended: 6 May 2010
- Predecessor: Patrick Mulligan
- Successor: Liam MacDaid
- Previous posts: Enniskillen; Curate, Enniskillen, County Fermanagh

Orders
- Ordination: 22 June 1958
- Consecration: 2 September 1979 by Tomás Ó Fiaich

Personal details
- Born: 3 February 1934 (age 92) Dublin, Ireland

Joseph Duffy (born 3 February 1934) in an Irish Roman Catholic prelate who served as a Bishop of Clogher from 1979 until his retirement on 6 May 2010. He resides in Monaghan Town, County Monaghan, Ireland.

== Early life and priestly ministry ==
Duffy was the eldest of three boys and one girl born to Edward Duffy and Brigid MacEntee of Annagose, Newbliss, County Monaghan. Born in Dublin, he was educated at St. Louis' Infant School, Clones, County Monaghan, and at St Macartan's College on the outskirts of Monaghan Town, where he was a boarder for five years.

He studied for the priesthood at St Patrick's College, Maynooth, and was ordained priest for the Diocese of Clogher on 22 June 1958. After his ordination he continued his studies in Irish and completed a thesis on the dialect of south County Tipperary for a master's degree in the National University of Ireland (the NUI) in 1960.

He returned to St. Macartan's College, where he taught Irish and French for twelve years. During these years he spent several sessions in French universities pursuing summer courses in French.

From 1972 to 1979 he was a curate in the parish of Enniskillen, County Fermanagh. This was a team ministry with three other curates and the parish priest, and included a chaplaincy to St. Fanchea's College for Girls, and a part-time chaplaincy at the Erne Hospital. During these years he was involved in PACE (Protestant and Catholic Encounter) and served on the committee of the Ulster Architectural Heritage Society (the UAHS.)

== Bishop of Clogher ==
On 7 July 1979, Duffy was named Bishop of Clogher, the first Irish bishop to be appointed by Pope John Paul II. He was ordained a bishop in St. Macartan's Cathedral, Monaghan Town, on 2 September of the same year. The Principal Consecrator was Tomás Cardinal Ó Fiaich, Archbishop of Armagh and Primate of All Ireland. Gaetano Alibrandi, Titular Archbishop of Binda, the Apostolic Nuncio to Ireland, and Patrick Mulligan, the Bishop Emeritus of Clogher, acted as the Principal Co–Consecrators.

Styles of Joseph Duffy
- Reference style: The Most Reverend
- Spoken style: Your Lordship
- Religious style: Bishop
- Posthumous style: n/a

For some years during the 1990s he served as media spokesman for the Irish Bishops Conference. He was also Chairman of the Commission for Communications of the Irish Bishops' Conference and the representative of the Irish Bishops on the Commission of the Bishops' Conferences of the European Union ([COMECE]).

His Church of Ireland counterpart during the latter years of his episcopal term was Bishop Michael Jackson. Each Christmas from 2002 on Duffy and Jackson delivered a joint Christmas message . Both bishops were also present at a service in honour of Saint Macartan, Patron Saint of Clogher at St. Macartan's College, the Catholic Diocesan Seminary in Monaghan. It marked the celebration of fifteen hundred years of Christian witness in Clogher Diocese.

On 28 January 2008 Duffy became the longest-serving ordinary in Ireland, having once been the youngest Irish bishop at the time of his episcopal ordination. In accordance with Canon Law he offered his resignation to the Holy See on his seventy-fifth birthday, on 3 February 2009.

His resignation was accepted by Pope Benedict XVI on 6 May 2010, when it was announced that Liam MacDaid would be his successor. MacDaid received episcopal ordination from Dr. Duffy in late July 2010.

== Failure to prevent clerical sexual abuse ==
Duffy received criticism for failing to report clerical sexual abuse in his diocese. In 2010, Duffy admitted that he was made aware in October 1989 of allegations of sexual abuse by Father John McCabe a priest and teacher at St Michael's College, Enniskillen (where Duffy was also chairman of the board of governors), when the parents of his victim reported to Duffy that the priest had been abusing their son from the ages of 9 to 15, Duffy failed to report the allegations to the police, the social services in Northern Ireland or the school that McCabe was then teaching at. McCabe eventually pleaded guilty in December 1995 to indecently assaulting the boy on 13 separate occasions. Duffy also admitted that he was previously party to least one civil settlement between the Diocese of Clogher and claimants of clerical sexual abuse, where the alleged victims were forced to sign a non-disclosure agreement as part of the resolution. In the same year, Duffy was summoned to the Vatican for a meeting with Benedict XVI to discuss what prior knowledge he had about allegations of sexual abuse of children against clergy members within Clogher diocese.

In 2013, a report by the National Board for Safeguarding Children in the Catholic Church was highly critical of Duffy's 31 year tenure as Bishop of Clogher, stating that he consistently failed to take steps to prevent members of the Roman Catholic clergy under his charge from sexually abusing children within the diocese. The report highlighted cases such as a priest facing multiple allegations of sexual abuse who was moved to a new parish in Ireland then sent overseas instead of being expelled from his ministry, and another priest who was accused of abuse to continue in his role instead of being removed from ministerial duties. Between 1975 and 2012, a total of 23 allegations of sexual abuse against Clogher diocese clergy members were reported to Gardai and 22 allegations were reported to the HSE, according to the report.

It was also revealed in 2013 that Duffy's deceased uncle, Canon Peter Duffy, had been investigated by the authorities in Northern Ireland for the sexual abuse of 3 children while he was parish priest of Donagh during the 1970s and 1980s, and that the Diocese of Clogher had since made civil settlements with the claimants. One of the alleged victims, Michael Connolly, stated that in 2009 he had provided graphic details of his allegations to Bishop Duffy during a private meeting, and although Duffy was sympathetic he did not appear to take any steps to determine if there were any other victims in the Donagh area.

== Selected works ==
- Patrick in His Own Words. Dublin: Veritas (2000)
- On Lough Derg Dublin: Veritas (1988)
- Lough Derg Guide. Veritas (1980)

Preceded by Patrick Mulligan	Bishop of Clogher; 1979–2010	Succeeded by Liam MacDaid
