= Charles McNally =

Irish Roman Catholic Bishop

- Bishop of Clogher
- Church: Catholic Church
- See: Clogher
- In office: 20 February 1844 – 21 November 1864
- Predecessor: Edward Kernan
- Successor: James Donnelly
- Previous post: Professor in Maynooth

Personal details
- Born: 1787 Ardaghy, County Monaghan
- Died: 21 November 1864 (aged 76–77)
- Education: Maynooth College

Charles McNally (1787 – 21 November 1864) was the Roman Catholic Bishop of Clogher in Ireland.

== Early life and education ==
Born at the townland of Ardaghy, near Monaghan town in County Monaghan, he entered Maynooth in 1808, aged 21 matriculating in Logic and was ordained for service in the Diocese of Clogher on 13 June 1813. In 1815 he was appointed professor of Logic, Metaphysics and Ethics, and in 1820 he was appointed Prefect of the Dunboyne Establishment at Maynooth College.

In 1843 McNally was appointed the Coadjutor Bishop of the Diocese of Clogher in Ireland succeeding less than a year later on 20 February 1844, following the death of his predecessor Bishop Edward Kernan.

== Bishop of Clogher ==
The esteemed Irish ecclesiastical historian Donal Kerr assessed McNally as an "O'Connellite Bishop and Reforming Pastor", the son of a 'middling farmer' who grew up in the aftermath of the 1798 Rising and would live long enough to see the stirrings of the Fenian Rising. He was O'Connellite in that he tolerated his clergy speaking on political matters, specifically the issue of the day which was the Repeal of the 1800/1 Acts of Union 1800 and in this regard he was in conflict with his Metropolitan bishop William Crolly.

He witnessed at first hand the Irish Famine and wrote of "corpses lying out in the fields...and none but the clergy can be induced to approach."

He died in office in on 21 November 1864 having served as bishop of his diocese for over twenty years. McNally was succeeded by Bishop James Donnelly.

Perhaps Bishop McNally's most enduring accomplishment is the decision to build Monaghan's St. Macartan's Cathedral. The bishop presided at a meeting of the Catholics of Monaghan where it was resolved that a church in the town was urgently needed. He then purchased an 8-acre (32,000 m^{2}) site on the outskirts of the town from Humphrey Jones of Clontibret. On 21 June 1861, the foundation stone was solemnly laid in the presence of most of the bishops of Ireland.

== See also ==
- Roman Catholic Diocese of Clogher

Religious titles
Preceded by Edward Kernan	Bishop of Clogher; 1844 – 1864	Succeeded by James Donnelly
