= Tyholland =

Tyholland Tigh Thalainn
- Village
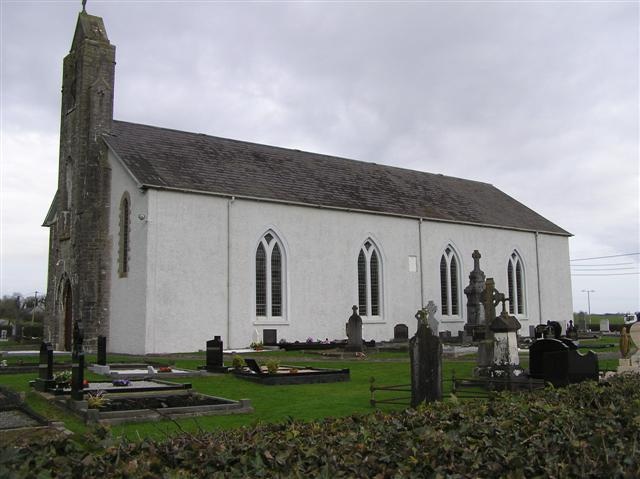
- Killyneill church, in Leitrim townland

- Location in Ireland
- Coordinates: 54°16′01″N 6°53′28″W
- Country: Ireland
- Province: Ulster
- County: County Monaghan
- Time zone: UTC±0
  - Summer (DST): UTC+1 (IST)
- Eircode routing key: H18
- Telephone area code: +353 (0)47

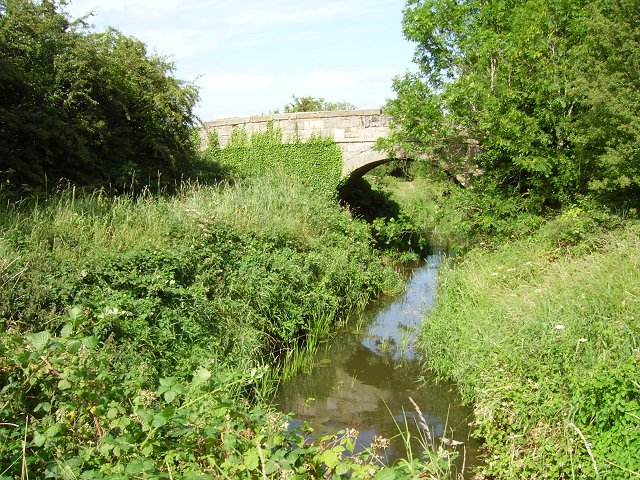
Ulster Canal in Tyholland parish

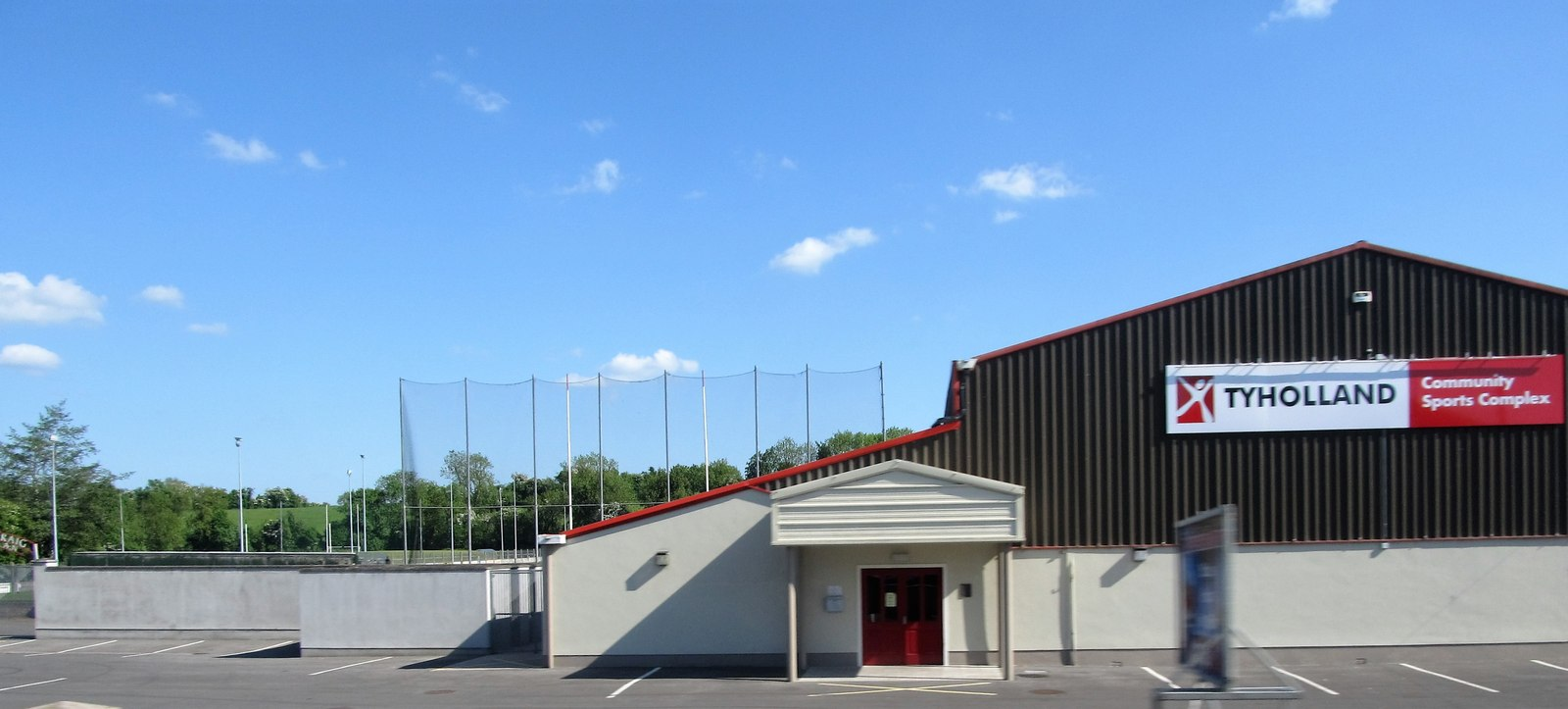
Community Sports Centre

Tyholland (Irish: Tigh Thalainn, meaning 'Talainn's house'), also known as Tehallan, is a small parish in County Monaghan, Ireland. It is the smallest parish in County Monaghan and borders County Armagh, Northern Ireland. For a period it was united with Donagh parish and later still with Monaghan parish. Since 1826 it has been once again a parish in its own right.

It borders directly on Tynan in County Armagh, Northern Ireland, in the east. To the southeast lies Clontibret parish, to the south and west Monaghan parish, and to the north is Donagh parish.

The disused Ulster Canal passes through the area of the parish, as does the N12, R185, and R213 roads. Tyholland has a Community Sports Centre at the N12.

== History ==
County Monaghan’s sole contribution to the Fenian Rising of 1867 was in Tyholland, where James Blayney Rice was the "Head Centre" of the organisation in north County Monaghan. His grandfather had been in the United Irishmen of 1798 and was involved in the Killyneill ambush of that year. O’Donovan Rossa was an important visitor to the Rice household and to the parish during the Fenian period. The Rice family were deeply involved in the political life of County Monaghan, and a large Celtic Cross at Tyholland Parish Church is a commemoration of the work done by them.

Bishop Liam McDaid, was Administrator of the parish of Tyholland from 1993 until his appointment as Bishop of Clogher on 6 May 2010.

== Sport ==
Tyholland is home to Tyholland GAA football club, established in 1952, [[Junior Championship winners 1996. All-Ireland 7s junior winners 1997. Intermediate league winners 2001 & 2004. Intermediate championship winners in 2007. All-Ireland junior ladies Champions 2002]]
