= N12 road (Ireland) =

Road in Ireland

N12 road
- Bóthar N12

Route information
- Length: 6.87 km (4.27 mi)

Location
- Country: Ireland

Highway system
- Roads in Ireland; Motorways; Primary; Secondary; Regional

The N12 road is one of the shortest national primary roads in the Republic of Ireland, running 6.87 km (4.27 mi) from outside Monaghan (where it leaves the N2) to the border with County Armagh, Northern Ireland, at Ardgonnell Bridge outside Middletown. The N12 is part of an overall route running from Cavan Town to Belfast.

== Route details ==
The route, entirely contained within County Monaghan, commences at the junction with the N2 on the outskirts of Monaghan town, in the townland of Coolshannagh. From here the route passes through the townlands of Tullyhirm and Cavanreagh, with the R185 leaving the route to the north. Just before the border, the N12 passes through Tyholland, and in the townland of Killyneill just after this and before the border, the R213 leaves the route to the south.

The overall Cavan Town-Belfast route, of which the N12 is but a link, passes through Butlersbridge, Wattlebridge, Clones, Smithborough and Monaghan Town as the N54 / A3. After the N12, it passes through or around Middletown, Armagh, Portadown, Lurgan and Lisburn as the A3, and A1 (from Lisburn to Belfast). Similar routes in the Republic of Ireland, which constitute part of a route that also passes through Northern Ireland, include the N2, N3 and routes N13–N16. The east–west route corridor of which the N12 is a part also includes the N54 to the west of Monaghan.

== Architecture and history ==
A small aqueduct runs parallel to Ardgonnell Bridge, where the N12 meets the A3. The aqueduct formerly carried the now defunct Ulster Canal across the Corr River from County Monaghan to County Armagh.

The N12 was formerly part of the T15 trunk road, which was a route from Galway to the border (and eventually Belfast).

On Thursday, 7 December 2017, Ardgonnell Bridge on the route was visited by the Exiting the European Union Select Committee ('the Brexit Committee') of the British House of Commons. Ardgonnell Bridge spans the Corr River between County Monaghan and County Armagh. The select committee was visiting where the N12 meets the A3 as part of a wider visit to inspect parts of 'the Border' between the Republic of Ireland and Northern Ireland.

== Future plans ==
There are no immediate programmes to upgrade the N12. However, Monaghan County Council include a proposed realignment of the route in their development plan.

== See also ==
- Roads in Ireland
- Motorways in Ireland
- National secondary road
- Regional road
