= James Donnelly (bishop) =

Irish Catholic bishop

Most Reverend Dr. James Donnelly
- Bishop of Clogher
- Church: Catholic Church
- See: Clogher
- In office: 26 February 1865 – 28 December 1893
- Predecessor: Bishop Charles McNally
- Successor: Bishop Richard Owens

Personal details
- Born: 12 January 1823 Scotstown, County Monaghan
- Died: 28 December 1893 (aged 70)
- Education: Maynooth College

James Donnelly (12 January 1823 – 28 December 1893) was Roman Catholic bishop of the Diocese of Clogher in the Archdiocese of Armagh in Ireland.

Born in Scotstown, County Monaghan, he studied in St. Patrick's College, Maynooth and was a priest in the Diocese of Clogher ordained in June 1846. He was a professor in the Diocesan College of St Macartan's College in 1848 and Professor in the Irish College in Paris before being appointed Parish Priest of Roslea in County Fermanagh. He was appointed as Coadjutor Bishop of Clogher on 11 December 1864, and succeeded automatically to the See following the death of Bishop Charles McNally. He was ordained bishop on 26 February 1865. He died in office in on 28 December 1893 having served as bishop of his diocese for almost twenty-nine years. Donnelly was succeeded by Bishop Richard Owens.

Donnelly supervised the erection of St Macartan's Cathedral in Monaghan, work started by his predecessor, Bishop Charles McNally. The cathedral was consecrated on 21 August 1892 in the presence of the bishops of Ireland.

Donnelly was instrumental in the formation in March 1874 of the County Monaghan Liberal Registration Association to ensure that the maximum number possible of Catholic voters were registered for elections. He used the priests of the diocese as a means of organising the Catholic vote. His relationship with the local landlord in Monaghan town, Lord Rossmore, was stormy. The bishop took the side the tenants in their quest for security of tenure and, later, land ownership. Lord Rossmore responded by withdrawing the rights to the use of a quarry that was being used for stone to build the new cathedral. Donnelly was on good terms with other local landlords and with officials at local and national level, and with Lady Rossmore and her mother, both of whom converted to Catholicism.

When the Vatican I was held in 1869-70 Bishop Donnelly attended for the full duration of the council. He supported the declaration on Papal Infallibility. During his many visits to Rome and to the European continent generally he collected statuary and other items for the new cathedral.

Bishop Donnelly maintained very detailed records including a journal or diary which is in the possession of the Diocese of Clogher.

== See also ==
- Roman Catholic Diocese of Clogher

Religious titles
Preceded by Bishop Charles McNally	Bishop of Clogher; 1865 – 1894	Succeeded by Bishop Richard Owens
