= Richard Owens (bishop) =

Catholic bishop in Ireland

- Bishop of Clogher
- Church: Roman Catholicism
- See: Diocese of Clogher
- In office: 6 July 1894 - 1909
- Predecessor: James Donnelly
- Successor: Patrick McKenna
- Previous post: unknown

Personal details
- Born: 4 January 1840 Clogher, County Tyrone

Richard Owens (4 January 1840 – 1909) was a Catholic priest in the Diocese of Clogher, Ireland.

Dr. Owens was born in Clogher, County Tyrone. He was born at Aghavea on 4 January 1840; and educated at St Macartan's College, Monaghan and St Patrick's College, Maynooth. After curacies at Maguiresbridge and Donagh he was on the staff of St Patrick's, Maynooth. Later he served as Dean and Professor of Dogmatic Theology in Maynooth College.

He was appointed the Roman Catholic Bishop of Clogher on 6 July 1894, following the death of his predecessor, James Donnelly. He was ordained that same year. Bishop Owens was a supporter of the Gaelic League and other Nationalist campaigns.

He died in office in 1909 having served as bishop of his diocese for almost fifteen years. Owens was succeeded by as bishop by Patrick McKenna.

Religious titles
Preceded by James Donnelly	Bishop of Clogher; 1894 – 1909	Succeeded by Patrick McKenna
