= Magheracloone =

Magheracloone Machaire Cluana
- Rural community
- Location in Ireland
- Coordinates: 53°54′17″N 6°44′06″W
- Country: Ireland
- Province: Ulster
- County: County Monaghan

Area
  - Total: 52.415 km^{2} (20.238 sq mi)
- Elevation: 60 m (200 ft)
- Time zone: UTC+0 (WET)
  - Summer (DST): UTC-1 (IST (WEST))
- Irish Grid Reference: N825994

Magheracloone is a parish in south County Monaghan. Its name comes from the Irish Machaire Cluana which means 'plain of meadow'. A generally hilly parish; its name is derived from its most important place in ancient times; a flat area of land in the townland of Camaghy, on which the sports ground and ancient church of St. Molua were located. The parish covers 12,952 statute acres in area, making it the largest parish in South Monaghan. The parish borders three neighbouring counties; Cavan, Louth and Meath. Magheracloone is the only parish in Monaghan to border Meath; it is located approximately 90 km from both Belfast and Dublin.

During the 1840s, the population was approximately 9,000. During the 19th Century, the population declined sharply, largely due to The Great Famine. The current population is approximately 2,500.

Magheracloone contains the only gypsum mine in Ireland. Extraction from underneath the land has caused sinkholes on occasion, most notably in 1973 and in 2018.

== History ==
Magheracloone is at the South of Ulster. Its position just beyond the Pale and on the edge of two Gaelic kingdoms meant that it has always been a borderland. After the conquest of Ireland and the plantation of Ulster Essex was granted the lands of South Monaghan. Since the 17th century the absentee 'Shirley Family' landlords ruled the majority of land in Magheracloone. Their holdings have since been reduced to include a 4000-acre walled estate, just outside Carrickmacross, where the family seat, Lough Fea house, is located. They also technically own the west side of Carrickmacross Main Street, and continue to collect ground rents from most businesses located there, much to the ire of locals (the case for ground rent has been upheld in the Irish courts).

== The Battle of Magheracloone ==
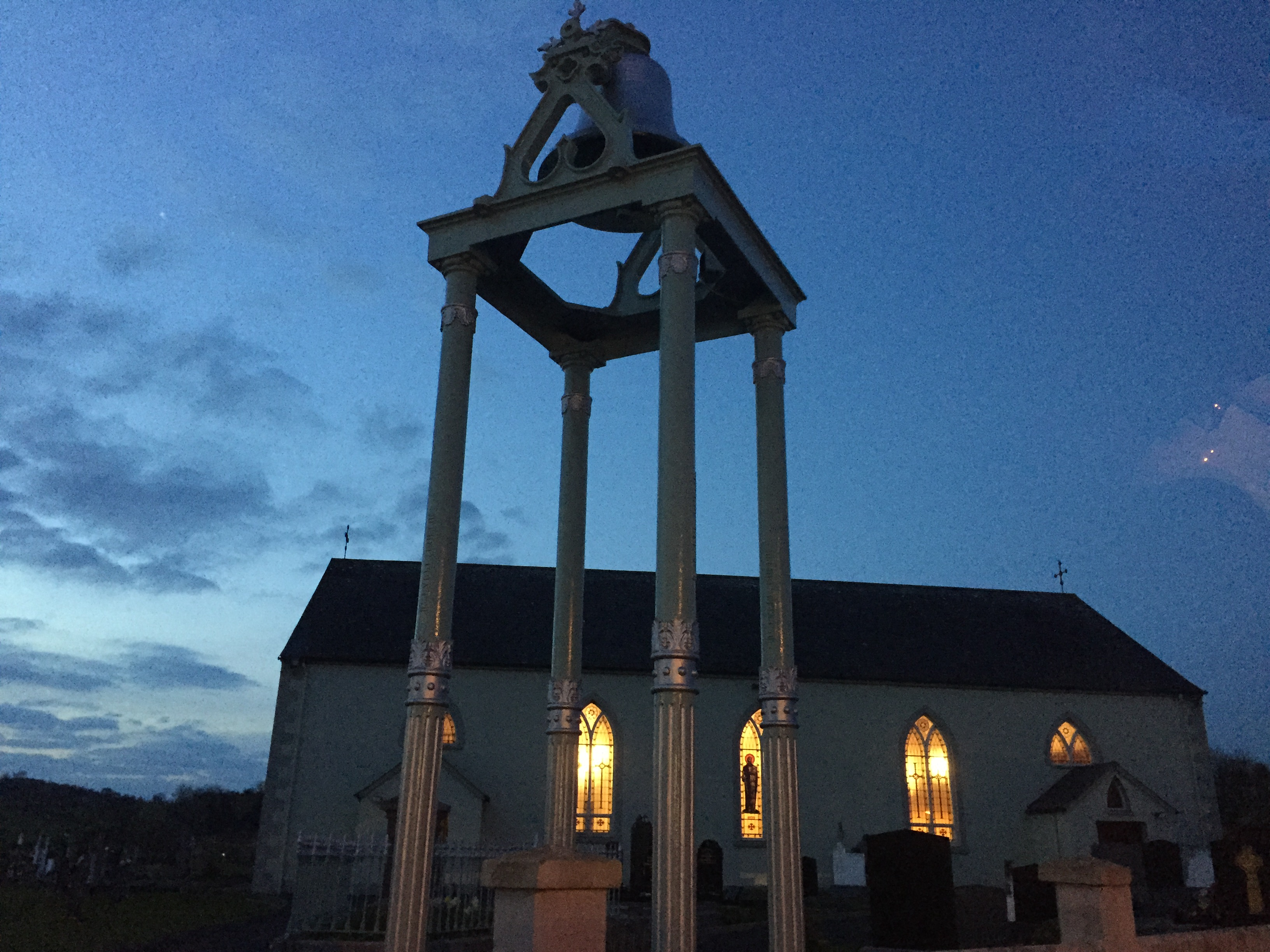
Ss. Peter & Paul Roman Catholic church (1825), Magheracloone, County Monaghan, Ireland

The 'Battle of Magheracloone' occurred in 1843 at Ss. Peter & Paul's Roman Catholic church. The text now follows of a plaque recently erected there in memoriam:

" In 1843 the tenants on the Shirley estate, of which Magheracloone was a part, refused to pay their rent until their complaints had been addressed by the landlord. Attempts by the bailiffs to seize cattle or goods from the tenants who would not pay were stopped by the activities of 'The Molly Maguires'. The centre of British rule in Ireland, Dublin Castle, agreed to provide troops to protect the agents who were serving notices of eviction to tenants. On 5 June 1843, a bailiff from the Shirley Estate along with a company of troops marched toward the church of Saints Peter and Paul (this very church) in Magheracloone. The intention was to post a notice of eviction to several tenants in the area, on the door of the church. They were met by a large, howling and hooting crowd who blocked their path. The troops fixed their bayonets and moved forward, only to be met with a shower of stones. Several of the troops were hit with stones and at the same instant the entire company discharged one round each from their guns into the crowd. The crowd backed off. The Company Commander, fearful of a greater slaughter, called his troops back to their carriages and they beat a speedy retreat, followed all the way by angry remnants of the crowd. However, back on the road in front of the church a young servant boy lay dead. Peter Agnew from Lisnaguiveragh, Carrickmacross was at service with Owen Smith of Corrybracken Two days later the coroner's jury (composed of six Protestants and thirteen Roman Catholics) held that as it was not known whose shot had killed the boy, no responsibility could be assessed. But the jury pointedly commented that 'it has not been sufficiently proved to us that at the time of the firing the party of Constabulary were in imminent risk of their lives'. (Outrage Papers). While this incident may be described as a mere skirmish with one fatality, reporting of the event in the local, national and international newspapers prompted questions to be raised in the House of Commons ".

== Religion ==
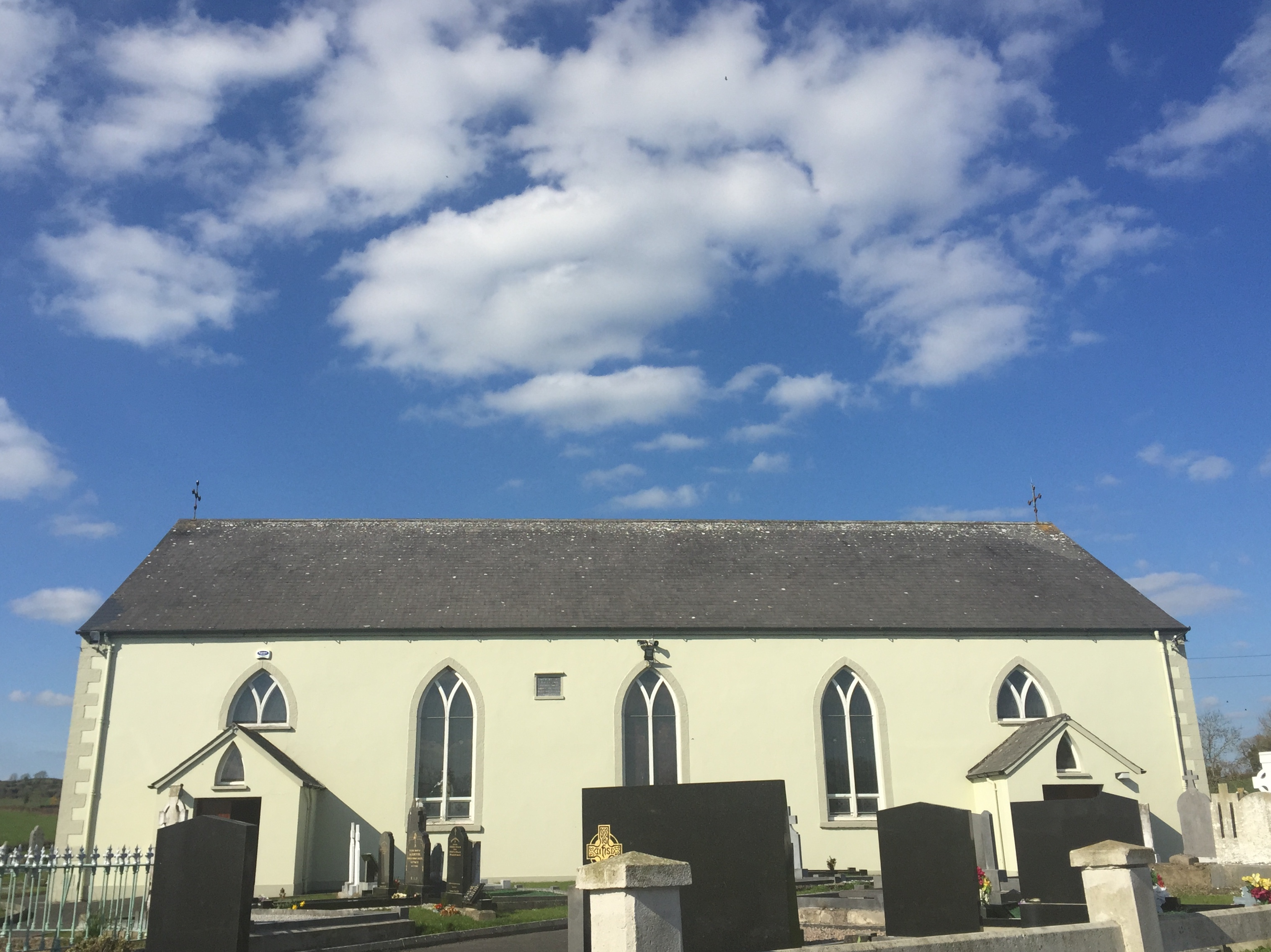
Ss. Peter & Paul church by day

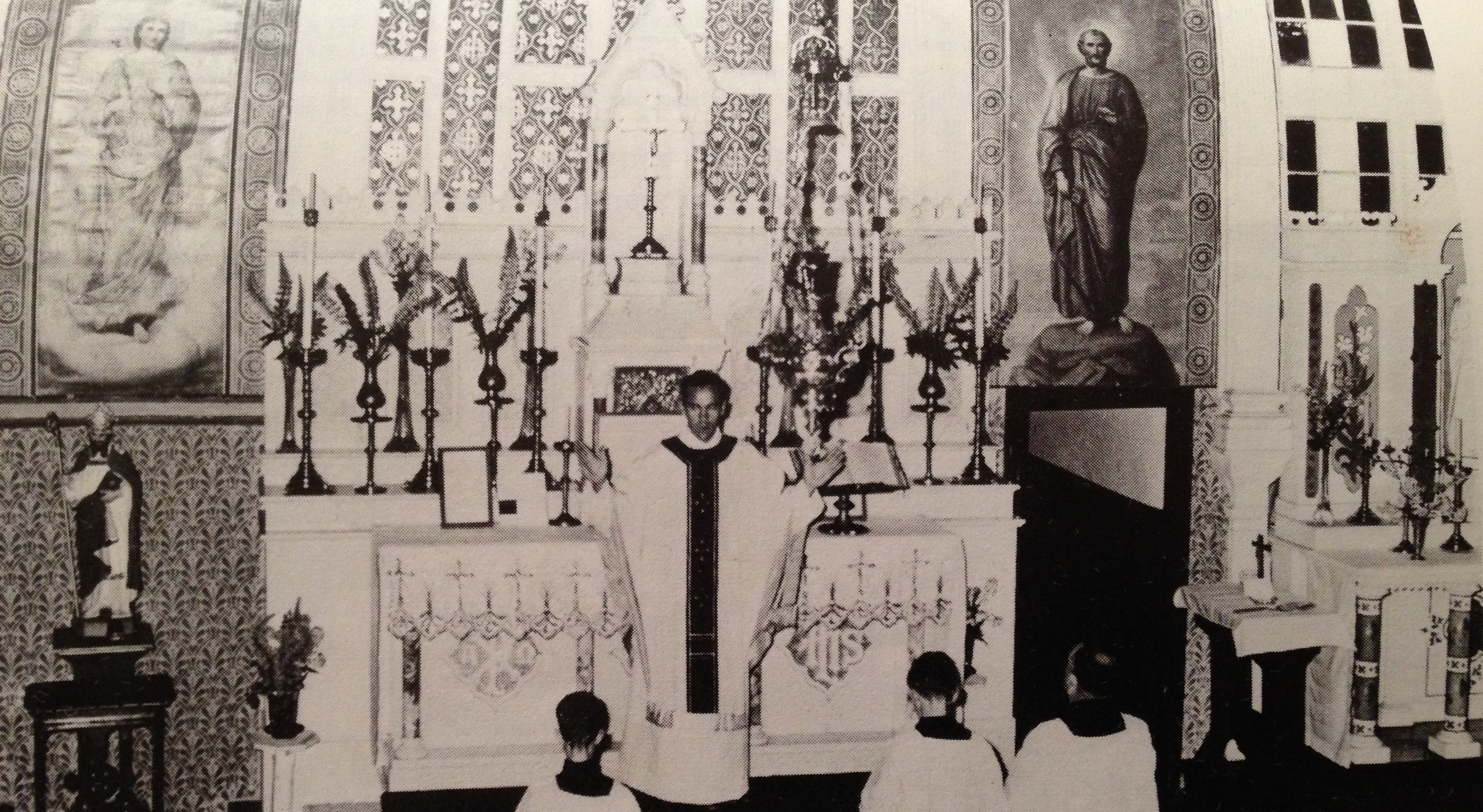

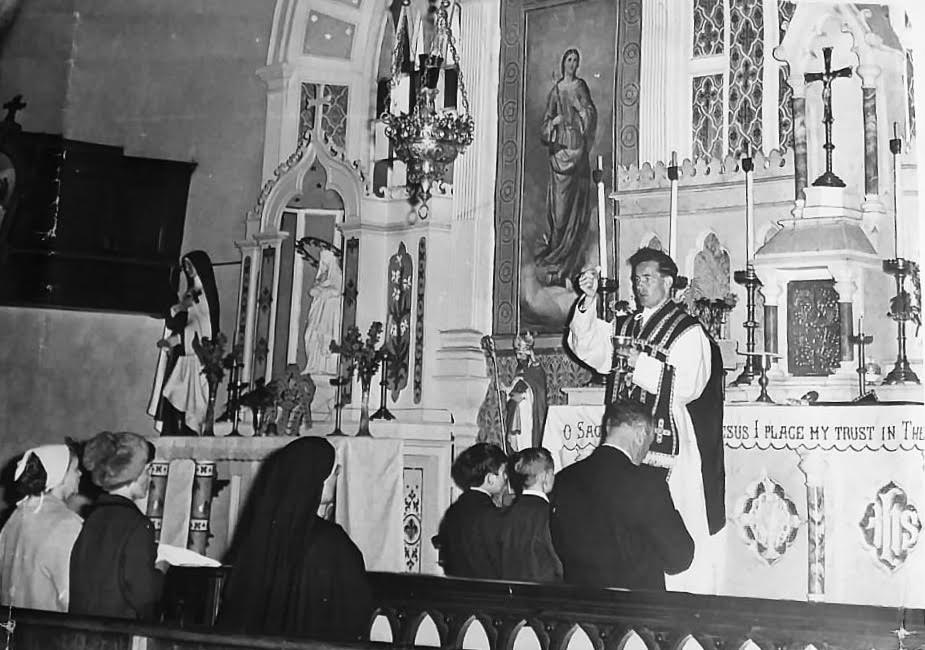
Father Eugene McCabe celebrates mass at the splendid pre-Vatican II high altar, Ss. Peter & Paul Church, Magheracloone

The people of Magheracloone have three churches; two Roman Catholic (Ss. Peter & Paul, and St. Patrick's) and one Church of Ireland (St. Molua's). St. Molua's is located on the site of the original Roman Catholic church, from which Catholics were barred during the penal laws. At that time, Catholics attended school and worshipped outside at 'hedge schools' and 'mass rocks', as they were barred from having suitable buildings for these purposes, speaking Irish was banned, and the people were required (in public office and many professions) to take an oath citing the supremacy of the monarch over the Roman Pontiff - an oath which Catholics obviously could not take. A mass rock exists on private property along the River Glyde in Tonaneave; a long stone crosses the river to form a bridge; the priest would stand on one side, and the congregation on the other; the river served to drown out their prayers, for fear of being heard by British soldiers. It is said that, during the Penal Laws, local Protestants kept watch on the hills above to ensure the safety of their Catholic neighbours hearing mass by the river in the valley below. Another example of such kindness comes from the story of a woman who was to be evicted from her home in the parish by bailiffs because she could not pay her rent; one of the soldiers took pity on her and passed around an iron cooking pot, collecting money from the other soldiers until enough was donated such that the woman's rent could be paid. Mass was most recently celebrated at this mass rock in the Jubilee Year 2000; it was concelebrated by PP Fr. Tom Finnegan, Canon Mohan and Fr. Michael J. Gilsenan and attended by a large congregation. The ceremony served to memorialise the victims of the penal laws, which climaxed in the tragedy of The Great Famine. Catholic Emancipation saw an explosion in the number of Roman Catholic churches and schools built in Ireland.

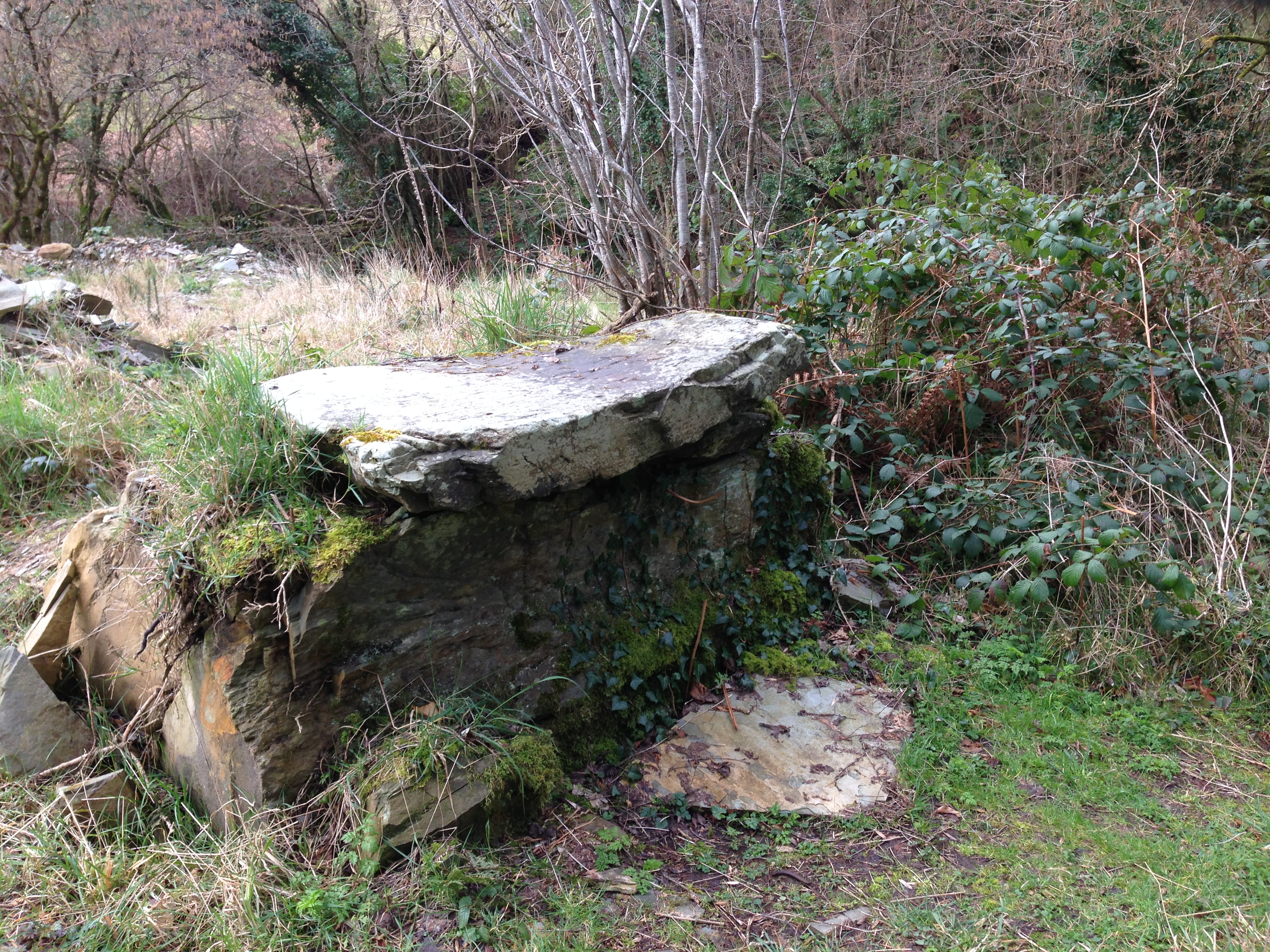
Mass Rock

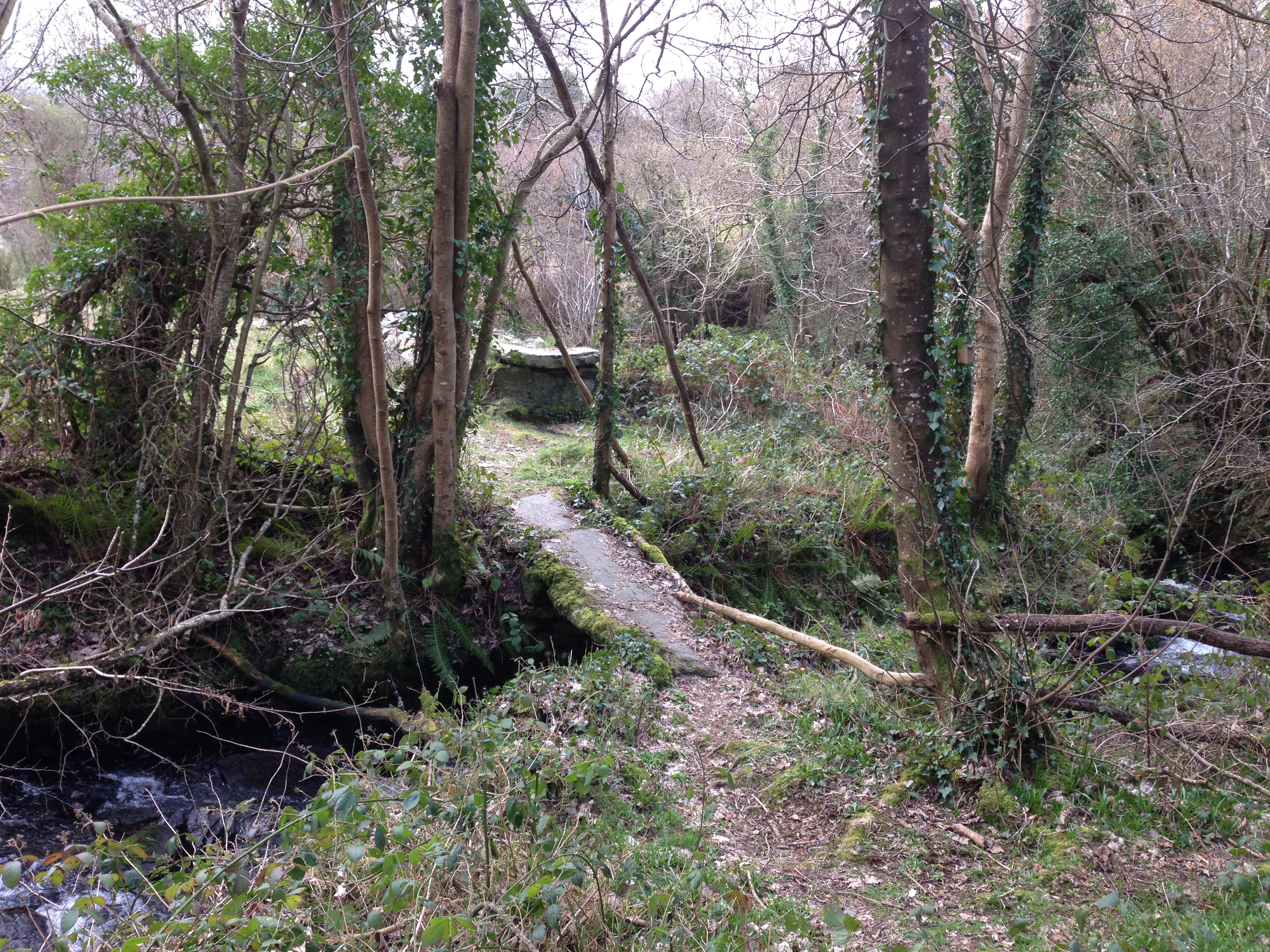
Mass Rock & Long Stone

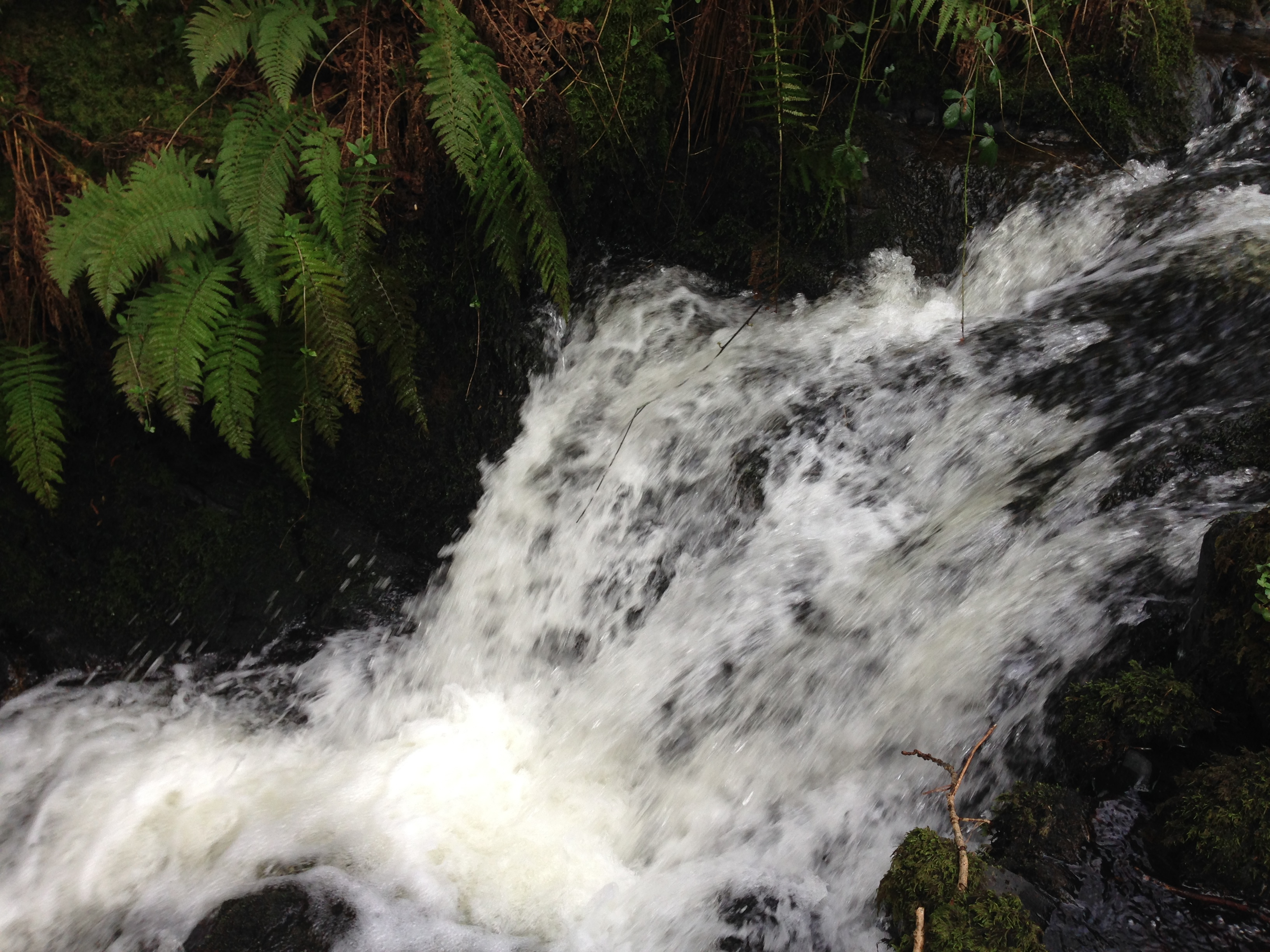
River Glyde

St. Molua's cemetery contains the remains of both Protestants and Catholics and was cleared from its overgrown condition in the 1980s, to much acclaim. (All cemeteries in the parish are immaculately maintained). In the 1970s, however, both the interior and exterior of Ss. Peter & Paul church (a 'barn church' constructed in 1825) were extensively damaged as a result of perhaps well-meaning but nonetheless gravely ill-conceived 'renovations' by then parish priest, Canon Drum, much to the consternation of locals who wished to continue worshiping at the altar built by their ancestors as an expression of their civic pride in the climate of Catholic Emancipation.

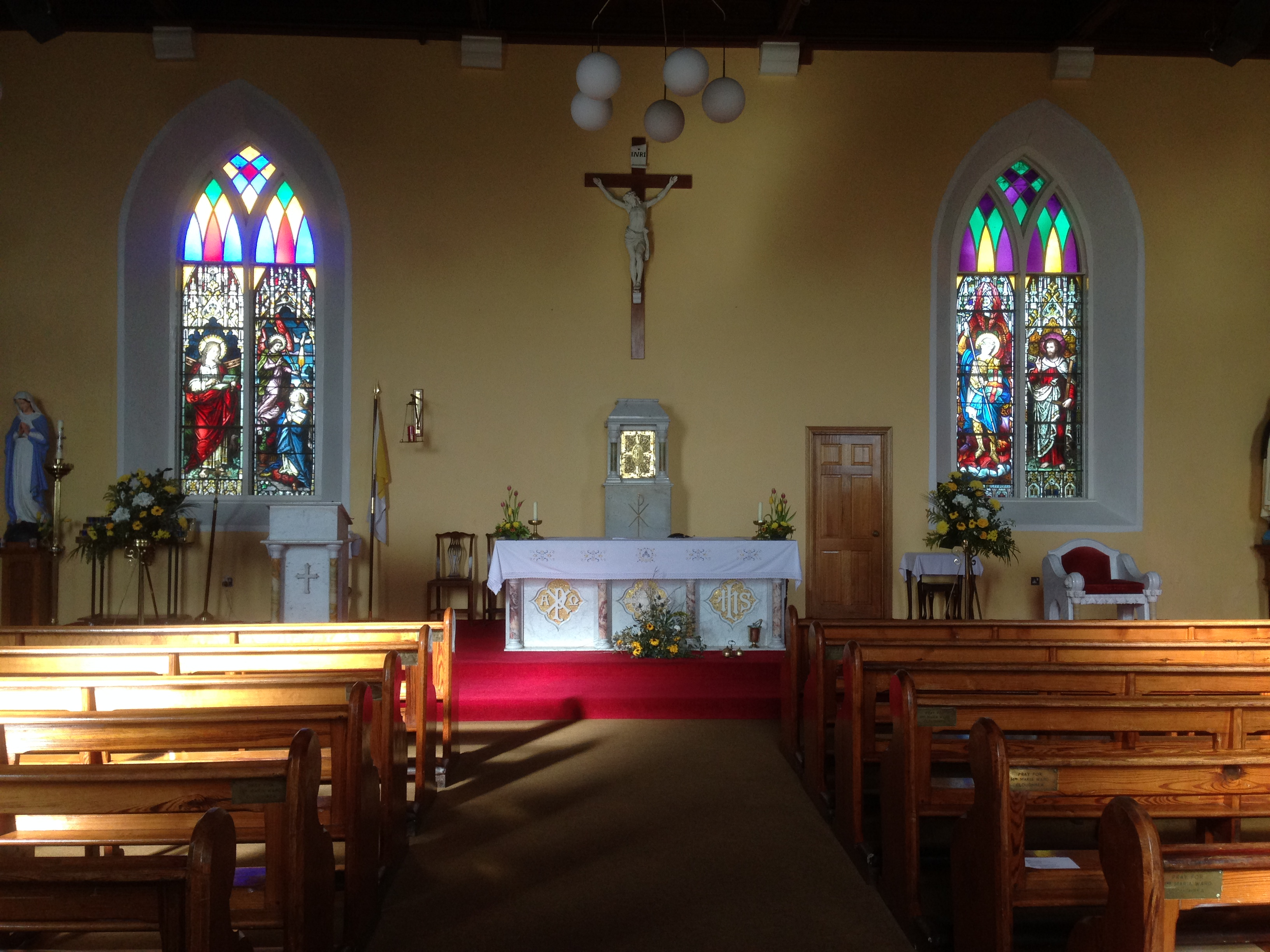
Sanctuary and high altar

The Ss. Peter & Paul church still includes an intricate wooden ceiling. Constructed on an east–west axis, facing the rising sun (a symbol of Christ - The Celtic cross features the rising sun, a Celtic symbol, fused with a cross, as a symbol of the new Christian faith conquering the ancient pagan one), the building is renowned for its light and spaciousness. Its Turnerelli altar and side altars, redoros, mosaics, galleries and pipe organ, were all lost. Two stone crosses were also removed from the pinnacles of the exterior gables and replaced with iron crosses.

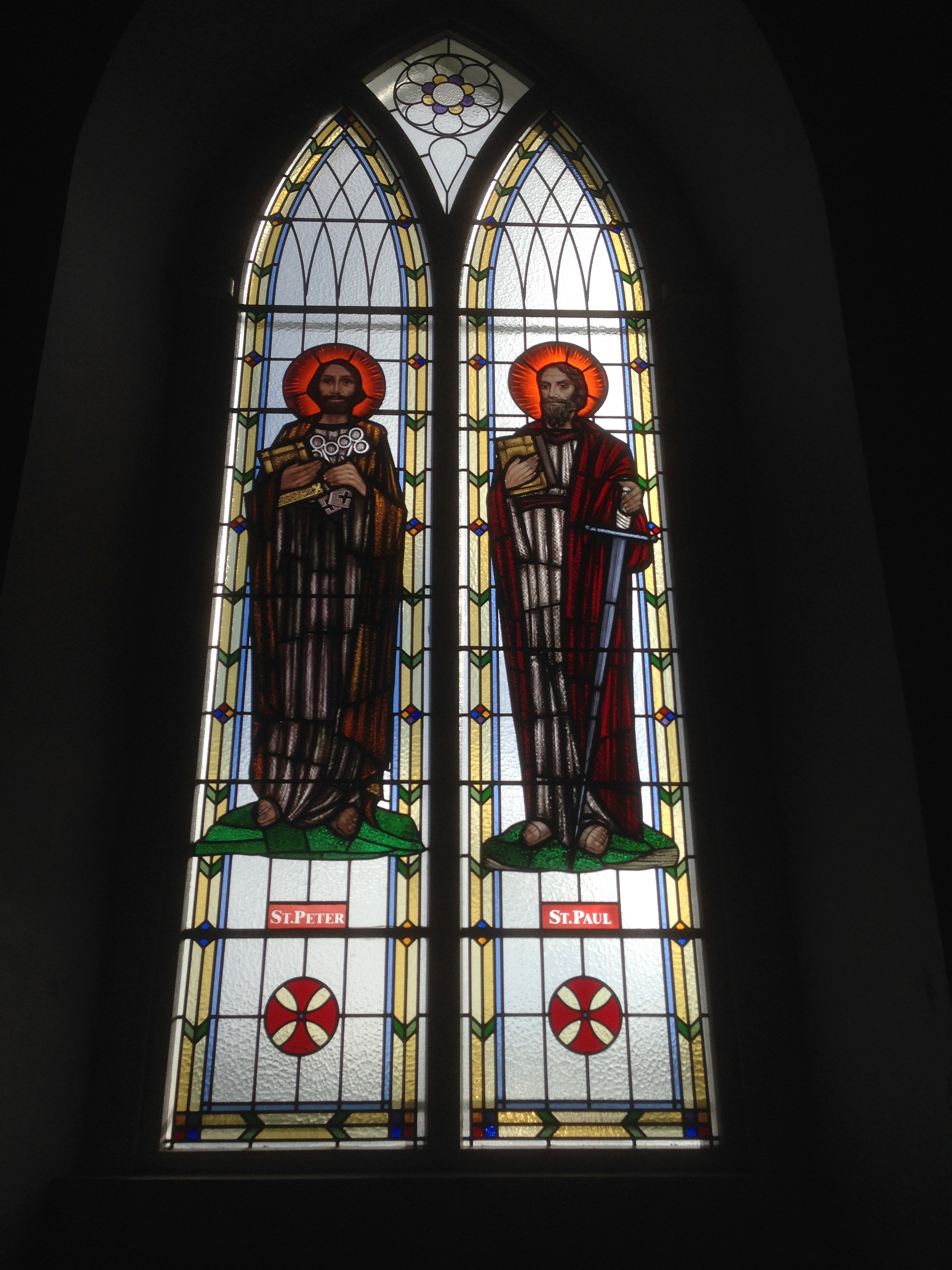
Stained glass, Ss. Peter & Paul

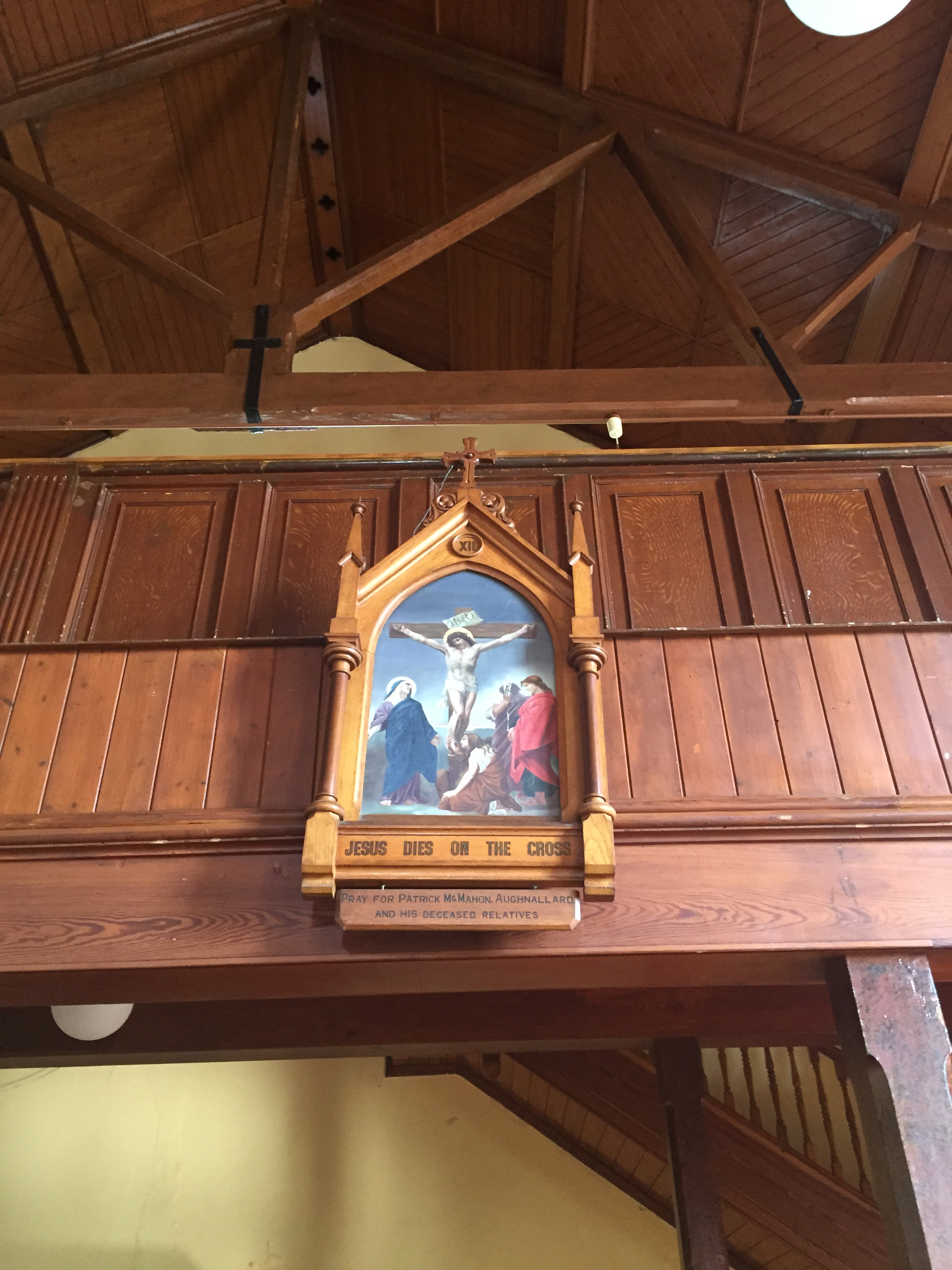
Interior woodwork

In 2000, the bell was electrified and the wheel and chain of this Victorian cast iron bell were removed and have since disappeared.

== Music ==
The nineteenth century harper Patrick Byrne was a native of the parish. Born and raised in the town-land of Greaghlone, he went on to achieve international fame, becoming the first person photographed while playing a harp. He retired to the townland of Beagh at the end of his life and is buried in Carrickmacross. A monument to the blind harper was recently erected by Magheracloone Heritage Group at the Ball Alley crossroads along the Carrickmacross-Kingscourt road (which passes through Magheracloone). A GAA sports ground and community centre are located next to this monument. Local harpist and All-Ireland medal winner, Rosey McCabe, played some traditional tunes at the unveiling.

== Amenities ==
Magheracloone is also home to several businesses, shops (including O'Rourke's service station and McGrane's 'Country Store') and numerous schools including Drumgossatt National School (formerly a barn church until Ss Peter & Paul was constructed); it has recently been extended to accommodate a significant increase in numbers.

== Sport ==
The local Gaelic football team Magheracloone Mitchells won the Monaghan Senior Football Championship in 2004. They have achieved runner-up status three times; in 2002, 2005 and 2006. Their colours are those of the parish, being simply black and white. Senior Gaelic footballer Thomas Freeman was presented with a GAA All Star award in 2007 and his brother, Damien Freeman is a former captain of county Monaghan's Gaelic football team. The parish also boasts under-14 boys' & girls' Olympic Handball teams. The boys' team achieved all-Ireland runner-up and the girls' team came 1st in Ireland in 2006.

== Sinkholes ==
In September 2018 a sinkhole made the local GAA pitch subside and Dromgossatt National School was evacuated. It happened in land over an old gypsum mine.

In April 2020 a crown hole appeared in land over the mine.

== Notable people ==
- Lawrence Duffy (born 1951), Roman Catholic prelate and current Bishop of Clogher
