= Patrick McKenna (bishop) =

Irish bishop (1868-1942)

- Bishop of Clogher
- Church: Catholic Church
- See: Clogher
- In office: 10 October 1909 – 7 February 1942;
- Predecessor: Bishop Richard Owens
- Successor: Bishop Eugene O'Callaghan
- Previous post: unknown

Personal details
- Born: 9 August 1868 Moybridge, Errigal Truagh
- Died: 7 February 1942 (aged 73)

Patrick McKenna (9 August 1868 – 7 February 1942) was a Catholic Bishop of Clogher in Ireland.

== Early life and priestly ministry ==
Born at Moybridge in the parish of Errigal Truagh, County Monaghan, he studied at St Macartan's College, Monaghan and Maynooth College. He was a Catholic priest in the Diocese of Clogher, Ireland, ordained in 1894. Following post-graduate studies at Maynooth he returned to the Diocese to serve as curate in the parish of Currin. He taught for a time in St Kieran's College, Kilkenny, following which he returned to Clogher Diocese to become curate in Enniskillen, County Fermanagh. He was appointed Professor of Moral Theology & Canon Law in St Patrick's College, Maynooth, in 1904.

He was appointed the Catholic Bishop of Clogher on 1 June 1909, following the death of his predecessor, Richard Owens (bishop). McKenna was ordained bishop on 10 October 1909.

== Bishop of Clogher ==
During his term as Bishop he had to contend with political strife and enormous political change, most especially the effects of the Partition of Ireland which also brought political partition to his diocese. He was a strong supporter of the Irish language and culture and did not hide from aligning himself with Nationalist and Republican leaders such as Eoin O'Duffy, on one occasion giving O'Duffy a glowing reference for a post with Monaghan County Council. While he regularly condemned the actions of the British forces in Ireland and the excesses of the IRA during the Irish War of Independence, he supported the Anglo-Irish Treaty of 1921. However, he also opposed partition and was specially mindful of the nationalist people of his diocese who were cut off from the new Irish Free State.

As a Bishop he was very popular among his priests and people and his clerical changes of priests between parishes became known as promotions rather than transfers. He introduced many changes to Diocesan policy, particularly regarding the celebrations of funerals. He died in office on 7 February 1942 having served as bishop of his diocese for just over thirty-two years. McKenna was succeeded by Eugene O'Callaghan.

The Ulster Council of the Gaelic Athletic Association (Ulster GAA) has a Gaelic Football competition, the Dr McKenna Cup, named after the bishop. He presented the Dr McKenna Cup to the Ulster Council GAA in 1925. It was first played for in 1927.

== See also ==
- Roman Catholic Diocese of Clogher

Religious titles
Preceded by Bishop Richard Owens	Bishop of Clogher; 1909 – 1943	Succeeded by Bishop Eugene O'Callaghan
