= Joseph Duffy (cricketer) =

Australian cricketer

Personal information
- Born: 1860; Ballarat, Australia
- Died: 1936 (aged 75–76); Ballarat, Australia

Domestic team information
- Years: Team
- 1888: Victoria
- Source: Cricinfo, 25 July 2015

Joseph Duffy (1860 – 1936) was an Australian cricketer. He played one first-class cricket match for Victoria in 1888.

== See also ==
- List of Victoria first-class cricketers
