= Patrick Mulligan (bishop) =

The Most Reverend Patrick Mulligan
- Bishop of Clogher
- Church: Roman Catholic Church
- See: Clogher
- In office: 18 January 1970 – 7 July 1979
- Predecessor: Eugene O'Callaghan
- Successor: Joseph Duffy
- Previous post: Archdeacon of Clogher

Personal details
- Born: 9 June 1912 Lisbellaw, County Fermanagh, Ireland
- Died: 21 January 1990 (aged 77)

Patrick Mulligan (9 June 1912 – 21 January 1990) was the Roman Catholic Bishop of Clogher in Ireland from 18 January 1970 until 7 July 1979, when he was succeeded by Joseph Duffy.

== Early life and education ==
He was born at Lisbellaw, County Fermanagh and educated at St Macartan's College, Monaghan and St Patrick's College, Maynooth.

He studied for the priesthood at St Patrick's College, Maynooth, and was ordained a priest of the Diocese of Clogher in 1937, a classmate of Cardinal William Conway. Later, Mulligan served as Diocesan Secretary for a period and also a teacher in St Macartan's College, Monaghan, and St Tiarnach's School, Clones, County Monaghan. He became the first President of St Michael's College, Enniskillen in 1957, retiring from that position in the summer of 1966.

In that year, he was appointed Archdeacon of Clogher and Parish Priest of Carrickmacross.

== Bishop of Clogher ==
Mulligan's appointment as Bishop of Clogher was made on 28 November 1969 and he received episcopal ordination from Cardinal William Conway, assisted by Archbishop Gaetano Alibrandi (Papal nuncio to Ireland) and Bishop William Philbin of Down and Connor, two months later at St Macartan’s Cathedral, Monaghan on 18 January 1970. The Archbishop of Dublin John Charles McQuaid was invited to concelebrate the ordination Mass but refused to participate in this then novel way.

As bishop he oversaw the implementation within the diocese of many of the changes brought about by the Second Vatican Council and during his term three new churches and several schools were built in the diocese. He was a knowledgeable historian and a published author of local history as well as being a noted Irish language expert.

He retired due to ill-health. He was succeeded by Joseph Duffy and while in retirement wrote a short History of the Diocese of Clogher as well as several articles for local historical journals, serving several terms as President of the Clogher Historical Society.

Mulligan died at Monaghan General Hospital on 21 January 1990, aged 77 years and is buried in the grounds of his Cathedral, alongside his predecessor.

== See also ==
- Diocese of Clogher
- St. Michael's College (Enniskillen)

Catholic Church titles
Preceded by Eugene O'Callaghan	Bishop of Clogher; 1970 – 1979	Succeeded by Joseph Duffy
