= Ecclesiastical administrator =

In the canon law of the Roman Catholic Church, an administrator of ecclesiastical property is anyone charged with the care of church property.

== Administrative authority ==
The supreme administrator and steward of to all ecclesiastical temporalities is the pope, in virtue of his primacy of governance.

The pope's power in this connection is solely administrative, as he cannot be said properly to be the owner of goods belonging either to the Church or to particular churches. Papal administrative authority is exercised principally through the Congregations of the Roman Curia and similar bodies

The ordinary is to exercise vigilance over the administration of the property of the diocese, religious institute or other juridical bodies subject to him.

What follows is taken from the 1913 Catholic Encyclopedia. With the coming into force of the Code of Canon Law in 1917 and its revision in 1983, the provisions of canon law have in some points been changed. What is here needs therefore to be rewritten either by an expert in canon law or by someone who has at his or her disposal the time required to extract the necessary information from canons 1273-1289 of the Code of Canon Law and sources such as this commentary on the Code of Canon Law

In each diocese the administration of property belongs primarily to the bishop, subject to the superior authority of the Holy See. From the beginning of the Church, this power has been a part of the episcopal office (can. 37, Can. Apost., Lib. II, cap. xxv, xxvii, xxxv. Const. Apost.). On him all inferior administrators depend, unless they have secured an exemption by law, as in the case of religious orders.

Therefore, if an arrangement exists by which the administration of certain diocesan or parish property is entrusted to some members of the clergy or to laymen, the discipline of the Church, nevertheless, maintains the bishop in supreme control with the right to direct and modify, if need be, the action taken by subordinate administrators.

== Parish level ==
One of the duties of a parish priest is the administration of the moneys and goods belonging to his church. The Third Plenary Council of Baltimore, Tit. IX, Cap. iii, gave detailed regulations concerning the manner in which a rector is to acquit himself of this obligation. Among other things, it is required that he shall keep an accurate record of receipts, expenditures, and debts; that he shall prepare an inventory containing a list of all things belonging to the church, of its income and financial obligations; that one copy of this inventory shall be deposited in the archives of the parish and another in the diocesan archives; that every year necessary changes shall be made in this inventory and signified to the chancellor. The authority of the parish priest is circumscribed by the general authority of the bishop and by special enactments which prevent him from taking any important step without the express written permission of the ordinary.

== Lay administration ==
In many places lay people are called to a part in the care of church property, sometimes in recognition of particular acts of generosity, more often because their cooperation with the parish priest will be beneficial on account of their experience in temporal matters. Although the origin of the modern fabrica, or board of lay people, is placed by some in the fourteenth and by others in the sixteenth century, the Catholic Encyclopedia argues that it should be dated to as early as the seventh century, due to references in council documents.

Lay administrators remain completely subject to the bishop in the same manner as the parish priest. The difficulties caused by the pretensions of trustees in the United States during the early part of the nineteenth century evoked from the Holy See a reiteration of the doctrine of the Church regarding diocesan and parish administration notably in a brief of Gregory XVI (12 August 1841) wherein the Pope declared anew that the right of such inferior administrators depends entirely on the authority of the bishop, and that they can do only what the bishop has empowered them to do.

In some dioceses where the system of administration by lay trustees is in vogue the regulations and discipline of the Catholic Church are made a part of the bylaws of church corporations, a measure which is of advantage in case of a process before the secular courts.

== Religious institutes ==
The administration of property belonging to religious institutes under the jurisdiction of the ordinary rests naturally with their superiors, but the bishop may reserve to himself in the constitutions a large right of control and supervision. In reference to institutes under the jurisdiction of the Holy See, the bishop's right is limited to signing the report sent to Rome every third year by the superior.

Religious orders are exempt from diocesan control in the administration of their property, but are bound, when engaged in parochial work, to present to the bishop a report of the amounts they have received for parochial purposes, and of the use made of such contributions.

== Civil authority ==
The exclusive rights of ecclesiastical authorities in the administration of church property have been denied in practice by civil authorities, in the past. Hence the care taken in various councils to admonish administrators to secure the titles to church property in accordance with the provisions of secular law, e.g. III Plen. Balt., no. 266.
