= Mac Cairthinn of Clogher =

Irish saint and bishop (died 506)

St Macartan of Clogher
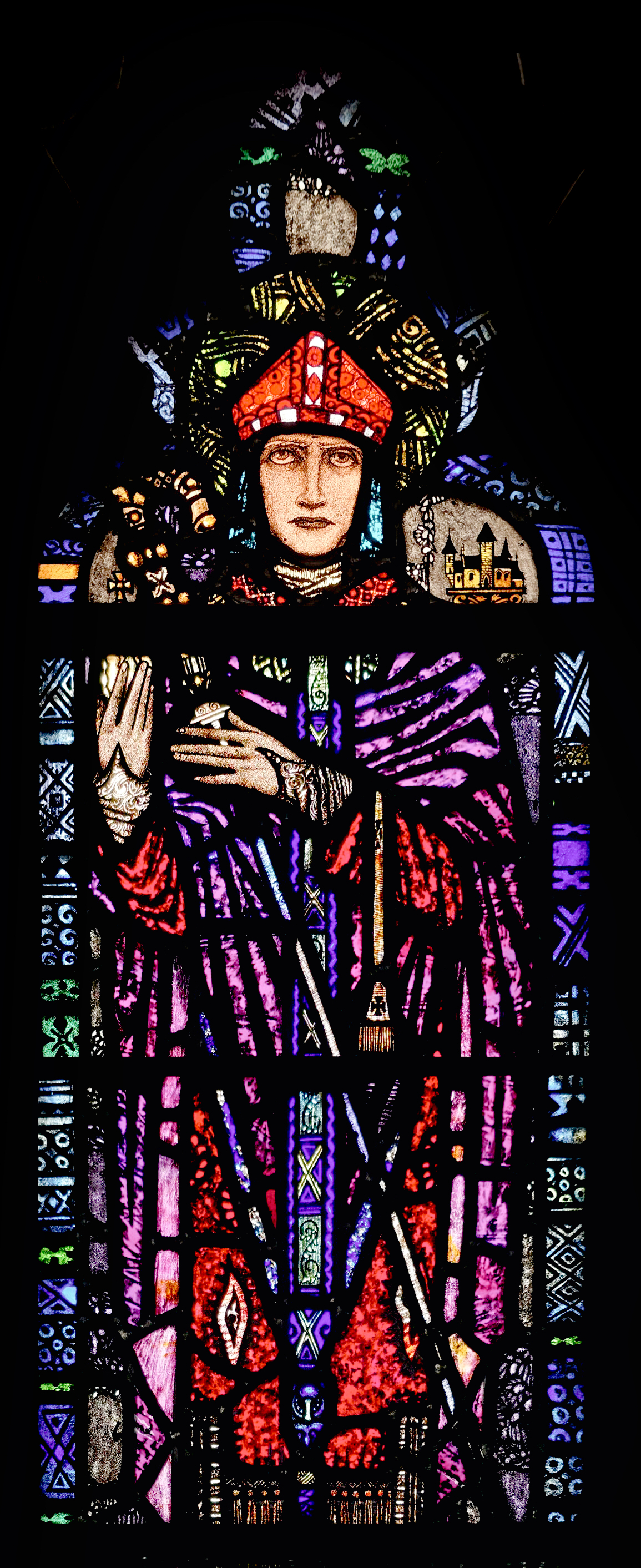
- St. Macartan by Harry Clarke at St. Joseph's Church Carrickmacross

Abbot and Bishop
- Died: 506; Clogher
- Venerated in: Roman Catholicism; Eastern Orthodox Church; Church of Ireland
- Feast: 24 March

Saint Mac Cairthinn, also Macartan, McCartan (died 506), is recognized as the first presiding Bishop of Clogher from 454 to his death. One of the earliest Christian saints in Ireland, he is known as Saint Patrick's "Threin Fhir", or "Strong Man" for his dedication and faithfulness to the fledgling Church. His feast day is 24 March.

== Legend ==
Saint Macartan grew up in the southern part of Ireland, somewhere in Munster. Before his conversion to Christianity by Patrick, the future saint was known by the name Aidus/Aedh, the son of Caerthen (son of the Rowan Tree). The identity of his father is uncertain but is sometimes associated with a Dalcassian prince of Thomond or with the Uí Maine of Connacht. Hence the Anglicized later name to come down to us is "Macartan". Some sources claim that he was uncle to Saint Brigid.

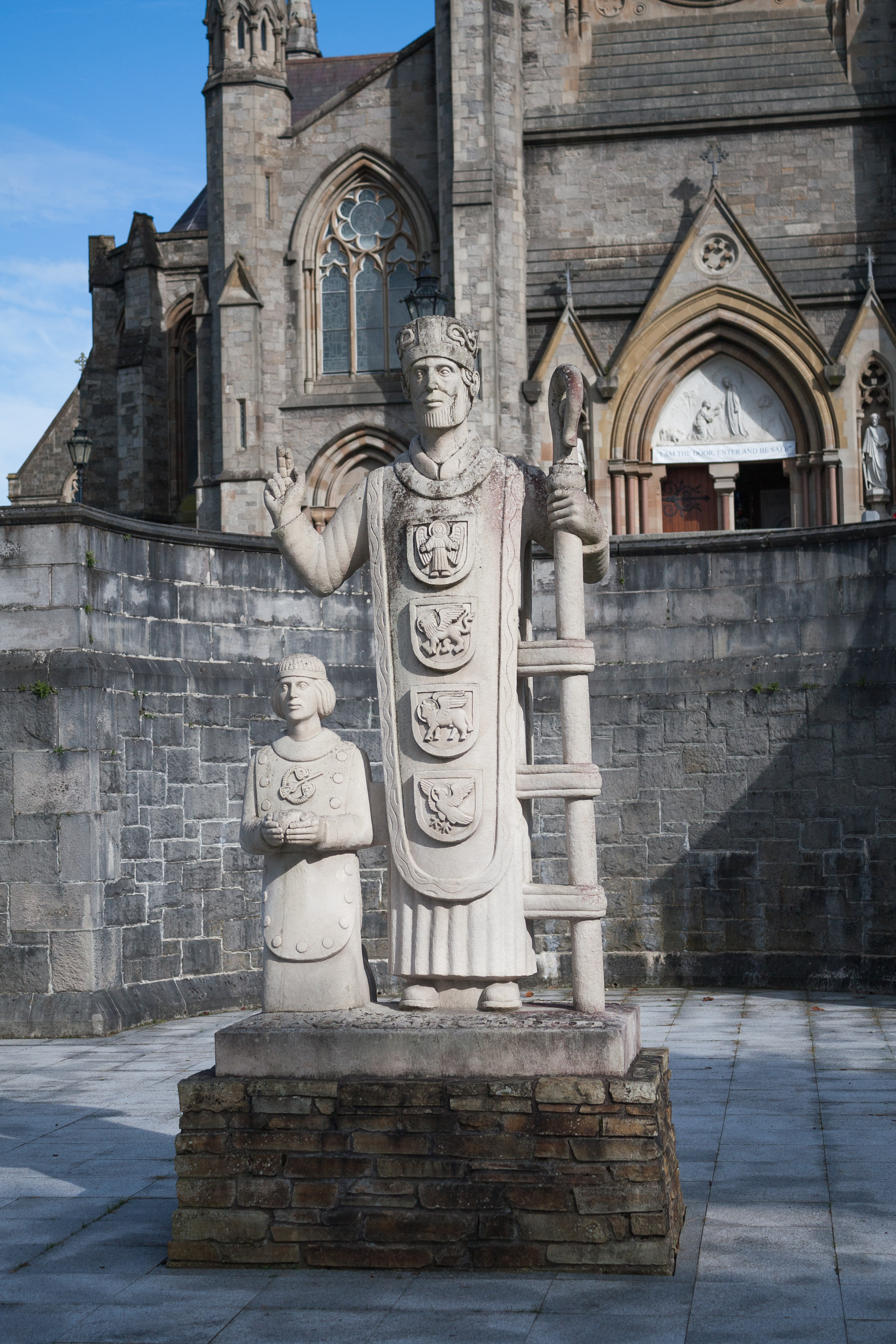
Statue of Macartan (right) with the local prince Cairbre

Hearing of Patrick's teaching, Aidus travelled from his home to hear him preach in Armagh, leaving behind his wife and child. He first met Patrick at Drumlease, near Dromahair, County Leitrim. Here Macartan was baptized and soon became one of Patrick's official missionary staff. He was spoken of as Patrick's "champion" or "strong man". We are told that when the great Apostle was worn out by his work Macartan supported his faltering steps over rough roads, marshes and rivers by carrying him. Macartan was initially ordained to the role of presbyter.

He was the "staff of Patrick" in the Irish patron saint's declining years. On one occasion after carrying Patrick over a river, an exhausted Macartan expressed a wish that he might be relieved from further travel and allowed to settle down in charge of some church close by his beloved master where he could spend the evening of his life in peace. Patrick, full of sympathy for his faithful companion and friend, agreed that he should establish a monastery in Clogher, and finish out his life there. A monastery was established near the ancient royal fort of Rathmore on the outskirts of the town and one of Ireland's oldest bishoprics was established. To commemorate the occasion Patrick gave Macartan his staff and a number of precious relics contained in a shrine known to tradition as the Domnach Airgid.

== Domnach Airgid ==
The Domnach Airgid (the Silver church) was made to enclose a manuscript that consists of fragments of 39 sheets of the Gospels, written in the distinctively Irish lettering of the eighth or ninth century. On the cover of the Domnach Airgid is one of the earliest surviving metalwork images of St. Patrick. Traditionally, the book was claimed to be that given by St Patrick himself to his companion St Macartan, making it an object of great veneration. Around 1350, the abbot of Clones, John O Carbry, commissioned a substantial remodelling of the Domnach Airgid. The figure of St. Patrick is thought to be at the lower right of the cover. In the lower left St. Patrick may be handing the Domnach Airgid to St. Macartan. The Domnach Airgid is no. 48 in A History of Ireland in 100 Objects, and can be seen in the National Museum of Ireland.
