= Latton =

Latton may refer to:

- Latton, Harlow, a village now situated in Harlow New Town, Essex, England
- Latton, a townland in Ireland, see List of townlands of County Monaghan
- Latton, Wiltshire, a village near Cricklade in Wiltshire, England
