= Isaac Pratt =

Irish anglican priest, Archdeacon of Clogher 1937–1957

Isaac Henry Pratt was an Irish Anglican priest. He was Archdeacon of Clogher from 1937 until 1957.

Pratt was educated at Trinity College, Dublin, and ordained deacon in 1903 and priest in 1904. After a curacy in Bohoe, he was the incumbent at Rossory. From 1919 he was also Rural Dean of Enniskillen.

Pratt died on 6 March 1957.
