= List of townlands of County Monaghan =

This is a sortable table of the approximately 1,852 townlands in County Monaghan, Ireland.

Duplicate names occur where there is more than one townland with the same name in the county. Names marked in bold typeface are towns and villages, and the word Town appears for those entries in the Acres column.

== Townland list ==
Townland	Acres	Barony	Civil parish	Poor law union
Acres	77	Cremorne	Ballybay	Castleblayney
Acres	46	Monaghan	Tedavnet	Monaghan
Aghabog	93	Dartree	Aghabog	Cootehill
Aghaboy	83	Trough	Donagh	Monaghan
Aghaboy	114	Monaghan	Kilmore	Monaghan
Aghaboy North	79	Monaghan	Tedavnet	Monaghan
Aghaboy South	156	Monaghan	Tedavnet	Monaghan
Aghabrick	34	Monaghan	Tehallan	Monaghan
Aghaclay	98	Dartree	Aghabog	Monaghan
Aghaclogha	118	Monaghan	Tedavnet	Monaghan
Aghacloghan	233	Farney	Donaghmoyne	Carrickmacross
Aghaderry	214	Trough	Errigal Trough	Clogher
Aghadreenan	231	Farney	Donaghmoyne	Castleblayney
Aghadrumcru	69	Trough	Errigal Trough	Clogher
Aghadrumdoney	111	Dartree	Currin	Clones
Aghadrumkeen	181	Dartree	Aghabog	Cootehill
Aghadrumkeen	132	Dartree	Ematris	Cootehill
Aghafad	103	Farney	Killanny	Carrickmacross
Aghafin	184	Dartree	Clones	Clones
Aghagally	83	Monaghan	Tedavnet	Monaghan
Aghagaw	69	Dartree	Clones	Clones
Aghagaw	98	Monaghan	Tedavnet	Monaghan
Aghaglass	130	Farney	Inishkeen	Dundalk
Aghakista	256	Cremorne	Aghnamullen	Castleblayney
Aghalaverty	77	Monaghan	Monaghan	Monaghan
Aghalile	146	Farney	Magheross	Carrickmacross
Aghalisk	122	Monaghan	Kilmore	Monaghan
Aghaliskeevan	51	Trough	Errigal Trough	Monaghan
Aghalissabeagh	93	Monaghan	Clones	Monaghan
Aghalough	68	Dartree	Aghabog	Cootehill
Aghaloughan	138	Trough	Donagh	Monaghan
Aghamackalinn	292	Trough	Errigal Trough	Clogher
Aghanameena	129	Monaghan	Tedavnet	Monaghan
Aghananimy	118	Monaghan	Monaghan	Monaghan
Aghareagh	116	Dartree	Aghabog	Cootehill
Aghareagh East	294	Dartree	Currin	Cootehill
Aghareagh West	175	Dartree	Currin	Clones
Aghatamy	94	Farney	Magheracloone	Carrickmacross
Aghateskin	105	Farney	Donaghmoyne	Carrickmacross
Aghavilla	117	Farney	Donaghmoyne	Carrickmacross
Agheeshal	115	Farney	Donaghmore	Castleblayney
Agheracalkill	75	Monaghan	Tedavnet	Monaghan
Agherakeltan	176	Monaghan	Tedavnet	Monaghan
Agheralane	212	Cremorne	Ballybay	Castleblayney
Aghinillard	179	Farney	Magheracloone	Carrickmacross
Aghintamy	104	Monaghan	Monaghan	Monaghan
Aghlattacru	128	Farney	Magheracloone	Carrickmacross
Aghmakerr	256	Cremorne	Aghnamullen	Castleblayney
Aghnaclea	167	Monaghan	Kilmore	Monaghan
Aghnacue	176	Dartree	Aghabog	Cootehill
Aghnadamph	497	Cremorne	Muckno	Castleblayney
Aghnafarcan	135	Farney	Donaghmoyne	Castleblayney
Aghnagap	88	Trough	Donagh	Monaghan
Aghnagap	217	Monaghan	Monaghan	Monaghan
Aghnaglosh	221	Monaghan	Kilmore	Monaghan
Aghnaglosh	149	Monaghan	Monaghan	Monaghan
Aghnaha	85	Trough	Errigal Trough	Monaghan
Aghnahola	93	Dartree	Currin	Clones
Aghnahunshin	65	Monaghan	Tedavnet	Monaghan
Aghnamallagh	237	Monaghan	Drumsnat	Monaghan
Aghnamard	55	Dartree	Killeevan	Clones
Aghnamullen	173	Cremorne	Aghnamullen	Cootehill
Aghnasedagh	458	Monaghan	Monaghan	Monaghan
Aghnashalvy	33	Monaghan	Clones	Monaghan
Aghnaskea	51	Dartree	Killeevan	Clones
Aghnaskew	162	Cremorne	Aghnamullen	Castleblayney
Aghnaskew	264	Dartree	Currin	Clones
Aghnavar	53	Trough	Errigal Trough	Clogher
Aghnmeal	140	Cremorne	Clontibret	Monaghan
Alkill	124	Cremorne	Tehallan	Monaghan
Allagesh	284	Monaghan	Tedavnet	Monaghan
Alsmead	281	Cremorne	Muckno	Castleblayney
Altartate Glebe	228	Dartree	Clones	Clones
Alts	129	Farney	Magheracloone	Carrickmacross
Annacatty	115	Trough	Donagh	Monaghan
Annacramph	135	Monaghan	Tehallan	Monaghan
Annacroff	322	Farney	Killanny	Carrickmacross
Annadrumman	190	Cremorne	Clontibret	Castleblayney
Annagally	149	Monaghan	Tedavnet	Monaghan
Annagerril	124	Farney	Donaghmoyne	Carrickmacross
Annagh	301	Cremorne	Clontibret	Monaghan
Annagh	37	Monaghan	Drumsnat	Monaghan
Annagh	176	Trough	Errigal Trough	Monaghan
Annaghbeg	64	Trough	Donagh	Monaghan
Annaghbrack	82	Monaghan	Drumsnat	Monaghan
Annagheane	166	Dartree	Currin	Clones
Annaghervy	67	Monaghan	Kilmore	Monaghan
Annaghkilly	246	Dartree	Clones	Clones
Annaghmartin	150	Monaghan	Drumsnat	Monaghan
Annaghraw	112	Dartree	Drummully	Clones
Annaghybane	169	Dartree	Ematris	Cootehill
Annaghyduff	162	Dartree	Ematris	Cootehill
Annagleve	384	Cremorne	Clontibret	Castleblayney
Annaglogh	293	Cremorne	Clontibret	Castleblayney
Annagola	138	Trough	Donagh	Monaghan
Annagola	44	Monaghan	Kilmore	Monaghan
Annagose	272	Dartree	Aghabog	Clones
Annahagh	161	Monaghan	Monaghan	Monaghan
Annahagh	143	Monaghan	Tedavnet	Monaghan
Annahagh North	47	Monaghan	Clones	Monaghan
Annahagh South	121	Monaghan	Clones	Monaghan
Annahaia	111	Farney	Donaghmoyne	Carrickmacross
Annahaia	138	Cremorne	Aghnamullen	Castleblayney
Annahale	146	Cremorne	Clontibret	Castleblayney
Annahean	389	Farney	Killanny	Carrickmacross
Annahuby	134	Cremorne	Clontibret	Monaghan
Annalittin	299	Cremorne	Clontibret	Castleblayney
Annamacneill	208	Monaghan	Tullycorbet	Monaghan
Annamakiff	93	Dartree	Killeevan	Clones
Annamarran	279	Farney	Killanny	Carrickmacross
Annaneese	190	Cremorne	Ballybay	Castleblayney
Annareagh North	67	Trough	Donagh	Monaghan
Annareagh South	244	Trough	Donagh	Monaghan
Annaroe	124	Monaghan	Monaghan	Monaghan
Annaseeragh	128	Cremorne	Clontibret	Monaghan
Annaveagh	162	Dartree	Currin	Clones
Annayalla	361	Cremorne	Clontibret	Castleblayney
Annies	268	Dartree	Currin	Clones
Anny	161	Farney	Donaghmoyne	Carrickmacross
Anny	467	Cremorne	Aghnamullen	Cootehill
Annyalty	129	Monaghan	Tedavnet	Monaghan
Annyart	297	Cremorne	Muckno	Castleblayney
Annyeeb	76	Monaghan	Tedavnet	Monaghan
Annyerk	132	Monaghan	Tedavnet	Monaghan
Anveyerg	205	Cremorne	Aghnamullen	Castleblayney
Arclintagh	145	Cremorne	Clontibret	Monaghan
Ardaghy	320	Monaghan	Monaghan	Monaghan
Ardaghy Kill	100	Monaghan	Monaghan	Monaghan
Ardginny	98	Trough	Errigal Trough	Clogher
Ardkirk	134	Farney	Donaghmoyne	Castleblayney
Ardkirk	62	Trough	Errigal Trough	Clogher
Ardnasallem	116	Trough	Donagh	Monaghan
Ardragh	469	Farney	Magheross	Carrickmacross
Astrish Beg	37	Trough	Errigal Trough	Monaghan
Astrish More	77	Trough	Errigal Trough	Monaghan
Attiduff	97	Dartree	Ematris	Cootehill
Attiduff	74	Trough	Errigal Trough	Monaghan
Aughnacloy	172	Monaghan	Drumsnat	Monaghan
Aughrim Beg	160	Farney	Donaghmoyne	Carrickmacross
Aughrim More	227	Farney	Donaghmoyne	Carrickmacross
Availabane	167	Cremorne	Clontibret	Monaghan
Avalreagh	343	Cremorne	Clontibret	Monaghan
Balladian	270	Cremorne	Ballybay	Castleblayney
Ballagh	235	Monaghan	Drumsnat	Monaghan
Ballaghnagearn	142	Farney	Magheracloone	Carrickmacross
Ballakelly	136	Farney	Inishkeen	Dundalk
Ballingarry	150	Farney	Killanny	Carrickmacross
Ballintoppan	83	Dartree	Clones	Monaghan
Ballintra	113	Farney	Inishkeen	Dundalk
**Ballybay**	Town	Cremorne	Ballybay	Castleblayney
Ballycartlan	159	Farney	Magheracloone	Carrickmacross
Ballycronog	69	Monaghan	Monaghan	Monaghan
Ballygreany	160	Cremorne	Clontibret	Monaghan
Ballyleck	155	Monaghan	Kilmore	Monaghan
Ballyloughan	173	Farney	Magheracloone	Carrickmacross
Ballymacforban	109	Monaghan	Monaghan	Monaghan
Ballynagarry	166	Monaghan	Kilmore	Monaghan
Ballynahone	300	Trough	Errigal Trough	Monaghan
Ballynure	150	Dartree	Killeevan	Clones
Ballyrush	99	Farney	Inishkeen	Dundalk
Bannaghbane	150	Monaghan	Kilmore	Monaghan
Bannaghroe	141	Monaghan	Kilmore	Monaghan
Barndonagh	115	Farney	Magheross	Carrickmacross
Barratitoppy Lower	265	Monaghan	Tedavnet	Monaghan
Barratitoppy Upper	657	Monaghan	Tedavnet	Monaghan
Beagh	130	Farney	Donaghmoyne	Carrickmacross
Beagh	174	Farney	Magheracloone	Carrickmacross
Beagh	152	Farney	Magheross	Carrickmacross
Beagh	311	Cremorne	Aghnamullen	Castleblayney
Beagh	82	Monaghan	Monaghan	Monaghan
Beagh (Kearns)	118	Monaghan	Monaghan	Monaghan
Belderg	81	Trough	Donagh	Monaghan
Bellanagall	109	Monaghan	Monaghan	Monaghan
Bellanaman	72	Trough	Donagh	Monaghan
**Bellanode**	Town	Monaghan	Tedavnet	Monaghan
**Bellatrain**	Town	Cremorne	Aghnamullen	Castleblayney
Billary	60	Dartree	Clones	Clones
Billeady	237	Cremorne	Clontibret	Castleblayney
Billis	252	Trough	Donagh	Monaghan
Billises	115	Monaghan	Tedavnet	Monaghan
Binmore	133	Cremorne	Aghnamullen	Castleblayney
Black Island	109	Cremorne	Muckno	Castleblayney
Black Island	194	Dartree	Ematris	Cootehill
Blackraw	341	Monaghan	Drumsnat	Monaghan
Blittoge	171	Farney	Donaghmoyne	Carrickmacross
Bocks Lower	316	Farney	Donaghmoyne	Carrickmacross
Bocks Middle	255	Farney	Donaghmoyne	Carrickmacross
Bocks Upper	336	Farney	Donaghmoyne	Carrickmacross
Boraghy	188	Cremorne	Aghnamullen	Castleblayney
Bough	140	Monaghan	Tedavnet	Monaghan
Boughill	167	Dartree	Killeevan	Clones
Boughkeel	64	Monaghan	Tedavnet	Monaghan
Bowelk	129	Cremorne	Aghnamullen	Cootehill
Boyher	149	Dartree	Ematris	Cootehill
Brackagh	160	Cremorne	Clontibret	Castleblayney
Brackagh	201	Farney	Donaghmoyne	Castleblayney
Brackagh	179	Trough	Errigal Trough	Monaghan
Brackly	171	Farney	Donaghmoyne	Carrickmacross
Brackly	331	Cremorne	Aghnamullen	Castleblayney
Braddocks	183	Monaghan	Tullycorbet	Monaghan
Bragan	2,359	Trough	Errigal Trough	Clogher
Brandrum	215	Monaghan	Kilmore	Monaghan
Bree	152	Cremorne	Muckno	Castleblayney
Briscarnagh	253	Dartree	Currin	Cootehill
Brookvale	67	Monaghan	Drumsnat	Monaghan
Bryanlitter	223	Cremorne	Clontibret	Monaghan
Bullogbrean	255	Dartree	Clones	Clones
Burdautien	113	Dartree	Clones	Clones
Cabragh	307	Cremorne	Ballybay	Castleblayney
Cabragh	122	Monaghan	Drumsnat	Monaghan
Caddagh	296	Cremorne	Tullycorbet	Monaghan
Caldavnet	143	Monaghan	Tedavnet	Monaghan
Calliagh	237	Dartree	Aghabog	Monaghan
Callowhill	178	Dartree	Currin	Clones
Camaghy	272	Farney	Magheracloone	Carrickmacross
Camla	154	Monaghan	Monaghan	Monaghan
Candlefort	127	Farney	Inishkeen	Dundalk
Cappagh	52	Dartree	Clones	Clones
Cappagh (Kilgorially)	70	Dartree	Clones	Clones
Cappog	87	Dartree	Killeevan	Clones
Cappog	112	Monaghan	Tedavnet	Monaghan
Capragh	147	Farney	Donaghmoyne	Carrickmacross
Cargaghbane	238	Cremorne	Aghnamullen	Castleblayney
Cargaghdoo	302	Cremorne	Aghnamullen	Castleblayney
Cargaghlisnanarney	194	Farney	Donaghmoyne	Carrickmacross
Cargaghmore	264	Farney	Magheross	Carrickmacross
Cargaghoge	568	Farney	Magheross	Carrickmacross
Cargaghramer	198	Monaghan	Tullycorbet	Monaghan
Carn	145	Dartree	Clones	Clones
Carn	319	Dartree	Aghabog	Monaghan
Carn	60	Monaghan	Tehallan	Monaghan
Carnaveagh	458	Cremorne	Aghnamullen	Castleblayney
Carnbane	82	Monaghan	Drumsnat	Monaghan
Carneys Island	109	Dartree	Clones	Clones
Carnowen	144	Dartree	Killeevan	Clones
Carnquill	157	Monaghan	Tedavnet	Monaghan
Carnroe	622	Dartree	Currin	Clones
Carolina	152	Dartree	Aghabog	Cootehill
Carrachor	63	Monaghan	Tedavnet	Monaghan
Carrickaderry	194	Cremorne	Clontibret	Monaghan
Carrickadooey	266	Farney	Magheross	Carrickmacross
Carrickagarvan	185	Cremorne	Clontibret	Castleblayney
Carrickaldragh	229	Cremorne	Aghnamullen	Castleblayney
Carrickanoran	139	Monaghan	Monaghan	Monaghan
Carrickanure	225	Cremorne	Clontibret	Monaghan
Carrickartagh	354	Farney	Magheross	Carrickmacross
Carrickashedoge	249	Farney	Magheracloone	Carrickmacross
Carrickaslane	517	Cremorne	Muckno	Castleblayney
Carrickatee	594	Cremorne	Aghnamullen	Castleblayney
Carrickaveilty	392	Cremorne	Aghnamullen	Castleblayney
Carrickavoley	101	Farney	Donaghmoyne	Carrickmacross
Carrickinare	479	Cremorne	Ballybay	Castleblayney
Carricklane	110	Farney	Donaghmoyne	Carrickmacross
Carrickmaclim	217	Farney	Magheross	Carrickmacross
**Carrickmacross**	Town	Farney	Magheross	Carrickmacross
Carrickmore	128	Dartree	Clones	Clones
Carricknagoan	143	Farney	Magheracloone	Carrickmacross
Carrickykelly	290	Farney	Inishkeen	Dundalk
Carrigans	142	Trough	Donagh	Monaghan
Carrivetragh	181	Dartree	Clones	Clones
Carrowbarra	78	Monaghan	Clones	Monaghan
Carrowbarra Island	22	Monaghan	Clones	Monaghan
Carrowhatta	127	Monaghan	Tedavnet	Monaghan
Carrowkeel	138	Monaghan	Tehallan	Monaghan
Carsan	161	Dartree	Ematris	Cootehill
Cashel	549	Cremorne	Clontibret	Castleblayney
Cashlan	201	Dartree	Killeevan	Monaghan
Cashlan East	143	Farney	Donaghmoyne	Carrickmacross
Cashlan West	158	Farney	Donaghmoyne	Carrickmacross
**Castleblayney**	Town	Cremorne	Muckno	Castleblayney
Castleshane Demesne	379	Monaghan	Monaghan	Monaghan
Cavan	175	Dartree	Clones	Clones
Cavan	87	Trough	Errigal Trough	Monaghan
Cavan (Moutray)	185	Trough	Errigal Trough	Clogher
Cavanacross	28	Monaghan	Clones	Monaghan
Cavanagarvan	279	Monaghan	Kilmore	Monaghan
Cavanageeragh	72	Farney	Magheross	Carrickmacross
Cavanaguillagh	132	Cremorne	Clontibret	Castleblayney
Cavanavally	30	Dartree	Killeevan	Clones
Cavancreevy	221	Cremorne	Clontibret	Monaghan
Cavanleckagh	67	Trough	Errigal Trough	Monaghan
Cavanmore	77	Trough	Errigal Trough	Monaghan
Cavanreagh	86	Dartree	Currin	Clones
Cavanreagh	41	Monaghan	Tehallan	Monaghan
Cavany	188	Dartree	Currin	Clones
Church Hill	174	Cremorne	Muckno	Castleblayney
Cladowen	126	Dartree	Clones	Clones
Clanickny	188	Trough	Donagh	Monaghan
Claraghy	123	Dartree	Ematris	Cootehill
Clarderry	186	Cremorne	Clontibret	Monaghan
Clare Oghill	132	Cremorne	Clontibret	Castleblayney
Clenlough	86	Monaghan	Drumsnat	Monaghan
Clerran	237	Cremorne	Clontibret	Monaghan
Clery	118	Trough	Donagh	Monaghan
Cloghan	229	Cremorne	Clontibret	Castleblayney
Clogher	286	Cremorne	Ballybay	Castleblayney
Cloghernagh	223	Trough	Donagh	Monaghan
Cloghernagh	156	Dartree	Killeevan	Monaghan
Cloghfin	287	Trough	Errigal Trough	Clogher
Cloghnart	96	Trough	Donagh	Monaghan
Cloghoge and (or Tievadinna)	302	Farney	Donaghmoyne	Carrickmacross
Cloghoge and Tievadinna	302	Farney	Donaghmoyne	Carrickmacross
Cloghvally Lower	215	Farney	Magheross	Carrickmacross
Cloghvally Upper	249	Farney	Magheross	Carrickmacross
Clonacullan	73	Trough	Errigal Trough	Clogher
Clonacullion	161	Cremorne	Aghnamullen	Cootehill
Clonamully	109	Monaghan	Tedavnet	Monaghan
Clonamunsha	50	Monaghan	Clones	Monaghan
Clonaneor	174	Cremorne	Clontibret	Castleblayney
Clonavarn	139	Monaghan	Kilmore	Monaghan
Clonavilla	100	Dartree	Clones	Clones
Clonavogy	128	Farney	Donaghmoyne	Carrickmacross
Clonavogy	125	Cremorne	Clontibret	Castleblayney
Clonboy	57	Dartree	Clones	Clones
Cloncallick	78	Dartree	Clones	Clones
Cloncaw	124	Trough	Donagh	Monaghan
Cloncumber	97	Dartree	Clones	Clones
Cloncurrin	129	Dartree	Clones	Clones
Clondinnery	34	Dartree	Killeevan	Clones
Clonedergole	84	Dartree	Clones	Clones
**Clones**	Town	Dartree	Clones	Clones
Clonfad	248	Dartree	Drummully	Clones
Clonfad	127	Dartree	Killeevan	Clones
Clonisboyle	59	Trough	Errigal Trough	Clogher
Clonkeady	107	Monaghan	Tedavnet	Monaghan
Clonkeelan	230	Dartree	Drummully	Clones
Clonkeen	181	Trough	Errigal Trough	Clogher
Clonkeen (Cole)	188	Dartree	Clones	Clones
Clonkeen (Lucas)	255	Dartree	Clones	Clones
Clonkirk	314	Dartree	Clones	Clones
Clonleek	63	Trough	Donagh	Monaghan
Clonlonan	86	Monaghan	Tehallan	Monaghan
Clonlura	136	Dartree	Drummully	Clones
Clonmeenan	66	Farney	Magheracloone	Carrickmacross
Clonmore	132	Dartree	Clones	Clones
Clonnagore	165	Dartree	Drummully	Clones
Clonnestin	170	Dartree	Drummully	Clones
Clonoony	213	Dartree	Drummully	Clones
Clonoula	239	Dartree	Drummully	Clones
Clonrye	77	Dartree	Drummully	Clones
Clonsedy	297	Farney	Magheracloone	Carrickmacross
Clonshanvo	100	Dartree	Drummully	Clones
Clontask	84	Dartree	Drummully	Clones
Clontibret	132	Dartree	Clones	Clones
Clontoe	86	Monaghan	Tedavnet	Monaghan
Clontrain	191	Farney	Magheracloone	Carrickmacross
Clontreat	91	Dartree	Clones	Clones
Clonturk (Mason)	149	Farney	Killanny	Carrickmacross
Clontybunnia	147	Monaghan	Tedavnet	Monaghan
Clontycasta	230	Monaghan	Tedavnet	Monaghan
Closdaw	185	Dartree	Aghabog	Cootehill
Clossagh Beg	271	Cremorne	Aghnamullen	Cootehill
Clossagh More	412	Cremorne	Aghnamullen	Cootehill
Coaghen	100	Dartree	Killeevan	Monaghan
Coleman	163	Dartree	Drummully	Clones
Colgagh	180	Farney	Donaghmoyne	Carrickmacross
Comaghy	247	Cremorne	Muckno	Castleblayney
Comertagh	163	Farney	Magheracloone	Carrickmacross
Comraghs	207	Farney	Inishkeen	Dundalk
Conaghy	182	Dartree	Killeevan	Clones
Concra	319	Cremorne	Clontibret	Castleblayney
Connabury	143	Cremorne	Muckno	Castleblayney
Coohey	229	Monaghan	Tullycorbet	Monaghan
Coolaha	109	Farney	Killanny	Carrickmacross
Coolartragh	334	Cremorne	Clontibret	Castleblayney
Coolatty	87	Monaghan	Clones	Monaghan
Coolberrin	172	Trough	Errigal Trough	Clogher
Coolcair	157	Farney	Donaghmoyne	Carrickmacross
Coolcollid	101	Trough	Donagh	Monaghan
Coolcorragh	209	Monaghan	Drumsnat	Monaghan
Cooldarragh	169	Monaghan	Drumsnat	Monaghan
Coolderry	223	Farney	Donaghmoyne	Carrickmacross
Coolderry	263	Farney	Magheracloone	Carrickmacross
Coolderry	223	Farney	Magheross	Carrickmacross
Coolfore	183	Farney	Magheross	Carrickmacross
Coolkill East	194	Dartree	Ematris	Cootehill
Coolkill East	119	Monaghan	Tedavnet	Monaghan
Coolkill West	111	Dartree	Ematris	Cootehill
Coolkill West	88	Monaghan	Tedavnet	Monaghan
Coolmain	115	Monaghan	Monaghan	Monaghan
Coolmannan	158	Cremorne	Clontibret	Castleblayney
Coolmuckbane	42	Monaghan	Tehallan	Monaghan
Coolnacarte	180	Dartree	Currin	Clones
Coolnagrattan	154	Farney	Donaghmoyne	Carrickmacross
Coolnalong	179	Dartree	Killeevan	Clones
Coolreagh	138	Farney	Killanny	Carrickmacross
Coolremony	69	Farney	Killanny	Carrickmacross
Coolshannagh	132	Monaghan	Monaghan	Monaghan
Coolskeagh	131	Farney	Donaghmoyne	Castleblayney
Cooltrim	263	Cremorne	Aghnamullen	Castleblayney
Cooltrimegish	251	Cremorne	Aghnamullen	Castleblayney
Coose	363	Cremorne	Aghnamullen	Castleblayney
Coraghbrack	166	Trough	Errigal Trough	Clogher
Coraghy	216	Farney	Magheross	Carrickmacross
Coraghy	205	Dartree	Clones	Clones
Corbane	280	Farney	Magheross	Carrickmacross
Corbeg	78	Monaghan	Tehallan	Monaghan
Corblonog	49	Monaghan	Tedavnet	Monaghan
Corbrack	194	Cremorne	Ballybay	Castleblayney
Corcaghan	270	Monaghan	Kilmore	Monaghan
Corcaskea	94	Cremorne	Clontibret	Monaghan
Corclare	110	Trough	Errigal Trough	Monaghan
Corconnelly	147	Dartree	Killeevan	Clones
Corcreeghagh	402	Farney	Magheross	Carrickmacross
Corcreeghy	439	Monaghan	Kilmore	Monaghan
Corcrin	223	Farney	Magheross	Carrickmacross
Corcuillogue	244	Farney	Magheross	Carrickmacross
Corcullioncrew	139	Farney	Donaghmoyne	Carrickmacross
Corcullionglish	114	Farney	Donaghmoyne	Carrickmacross
Corcummins	118	Dartree	Killeevan	Clones
Corderrybane	234	Cremorne	Clontibret	Castleblayney
Corderryduff	161	Cremorne	Clontibret	Castleblayney
Cordevlis	138	Cremorne	Clontibret	Castleblayney
Cordevlis	243	Cremorne	Aghnamullen	Cootehill
Cordevlis	71	Monaghan	Monaghan	Monaghan
Cordevlis	82	Monaghan	Tehallan	Monaghan
Cordevlis North	143	Cremorne	Tullycorbet	Monaghan
Cordevlis North	125	Monaghan	Tullycorbet	Monaghan
Cordoolough	304	Monaghan	Tullycorbet	Monaghan
Cordressigo	108	Dartree	Ematris	Cootehill
Cordrummans Lower	69	Farney	Donaghmoyne	Carrickmacross
Cordrummans Middle	75	Farney	Donaghmoyne	Carrickmacross
Cordrummans Upper	91	Farney	Donaghmoyne	Carrickmacross
Corduff	267	Farney	Magheross	Carrickmacross
Corduff	253	Dartree	Aghabog	Cootehill
Corduff (Kelly)	245	Farney	Magheross	Carrickmacross
Corfad	239	Cremorne	Ballybay	Castleblayney
Corfad	134	Cremorne	Aghnamullen	Cootehill
Corfad	108	Monaghan	Tullycorbet	Monaghan
Corfinlough	195	Monaghan	Tullycorbet	Monaghan
Corglass	87	Dartree	Ematris	Cootehill
Corgreagh	378	Cremorne	Aghnamullen	Carrickmacross
Corgreenan	59	Trough	Errigal Trough	Clogher
Corhelshinagh	297	Cremorne	Aghnamullen	Carrickmacross
Corhollan	125	Monaghan	Drumsnat	Monaghan
Corkashybane	258	Farney	Magheross	Carrickmacross
Corkashyduff	258	Farney	Magheross	Carrickmacross
Corkeeran	147	Farney	Magheracloone	Carrickmacross
Corkeeran	211	Cremorne	Ballybay	Castleblayney
Corkeeran	117	Dartree	Killeevan	Clones
Corkeeran	214	Cremorne	Aghnamullen	Cootehill
Corkeeran	162	Dartree	Ematris	Cootehill
Corkish	97	Dartree	Aghabog	Cootehill
Corknock	55	Monaghan	Tedavnet	Monaghan
Corlagan North	93	Cremorne	Clontibret	Castleblayney
Corlagan South	129	Cremorne	Clontibret	Castleblayney
Corlat	216	Cremorne	Aghnamullen	Carrickmacross
Corlat	138	Dartree	Killeevan	Clones
Corlat	66	Monaghan	Monaghan	Monaghan
Corlat	87	Monaghan	Tedavnet	Monaghan
Corlattallan	147	Trough	Errigal Trough	Monaghan
Corlattan	100	Monaghan	Monaghan	Monaghan
Corlea	283	Cremorne	Aghnamullen	Carrickmacross
Corlea	186	Farney	Donaghmoyne	Carrickmacross
Corlea	252	Farney	Magheracloone	Carrickmacross
Corlea	190	Farney	Magheross	Carrickmacross
Corlea	319	Monaghan	Tullycorbet	Monaghan
Corleadargan	314	Cremorne	Clontibret	Castleblayney
Corlealackagh	256	Cremorne	Clontibret	Castleblayney
Corleanamaddy	137	Cremorne	Clontibret	Castleblayney
Corleck	157	Farney	Donaghmoyne	Carrickmacross
Corleck	305	Dartree	Aghabog	Monaghan
Corlongford	120	Monaghan	Tullycorbet	Monaghan
Corlougharoe	135	Dartree	Killeevan	Cootehill
Corlust	101	Monaghan	Monaghan	Monaghan
Corlygorm	192	Farney	Donaghmoyne	Carrickmacross
Cormeen	217	Cremorne	Aghnamullen	Cootehill
Cormeen	228	Dartree	Currin	Cootehill
Cormeen	181	Monaghan	Monaghan	Monaghan
Cormoy	111	Farney	Donaghmoyne	Carrickmacross
Cormoy	196	Dartree	Aghabog	Clones
Cormoy Lower	80	Farney	Donaghmoyne	Carrickmacross
Cormoy Upper	74	Farney	Donaghmoyne	Carrickmacross
Cormurphy	82	Monaghan	Monaghan	Monaghan
Cornabrandy	121	Cremorne	Clontibret	Monaghan
Cornacarrow	50	Farney	Magheracloone	Carrickmacross
Cornacarrow	355	Cremorne	Aghnamullen	Castleblayney
Cornacreeve	225	Trough	Donagh	Monaghan
Cornacreeve	120	Monaghan	Monaghan	Monaghan
Cornacreeve	105	Monaghan	Tedavnet	Monaghan
Cornacreeve	162	Monaghan	Tullycorbet	Monaghan
Cornacrew	101	Farney	Donaghmoyne	Carrickmacross
Cornafaghy	94	Dartree	Clones	Monaghan
Cornagall	97	Farney	Donaghmoyne	Castleblayney
Cornagarvoge	387	Farney	Inishkeen	Dundalk
Cornagilty	117	Monaghan	Tedavnet	Monaghan
Cornaglare	184	Dartree	Currin	Cootehill
Cornaglare	210	Monaghan	Kilmore	Monaghan
Cornaguillagh	109	Monaghan	Tedavnet	Monaghan
Cornahawla	138	Farney	Donaghmoyne	Castleblayney
Cornaheive	85	Trough	Errigal Trough	Clogher
Cornahoe	276	Cremorne	Ballybay	Castleblayney
Cornahoe	74	Monaghan	Tehallan	Monaghan
Cornahoe	143	Monaghan	Tullycorbet	Monaghan
Cornahoe Lower	161	Cremorne	Clontibret	Monaghan
Cornahoe Upper	216	Cremorne	Clontibret	Castleblayney
Cornalaragh	272	Farney	Magheracloone	Carrickmacross
Cornalough	149	Cremorne	Clontibret	Castleblayney
Cornamucklagh (or Garranroe)	193	Farney	Donaghmoyne	Carrickmacross
Cornamucklagh North	171	Cremorne	Clontibret	Monaghan
Cornamucklagh South	185	Cremorne	Clontibret	Castleblayney
Cornamucklaglass	182	Cremorne	Ballybay	Castleblayney
Cornamunady	123	Monaghan	Monaghan	Monaghan
Cornanagh	216	Monaghan	Tullycorbet	Monaghan
Cornanerriff	93	Farney	Donaghmoyne	Carrickmacross
Cornanure	224	Farney	Donaghmoyne	Carrickmacross
Cornanure	63	Trough	Errigal Trough	Monaghan
Cornanure	196	Monaghan	Tullycorbet	Monaghan
Cornapaste	169	Dartree	Currin	Clones
Cornasassonagh	284	Farney	Magheross	Carrickmacross
Cornasleeve	120	Farney	Donaghmoyne	Carrickmacross
Cornasoo	129	Monaghan	Drumsnat	Monaghan
Cornasoo	158	Monaghan	Kilmore	Monaghan
Cornasore (or Straghan)	124	Trough	Donagh	Monaghan
Cornawall	143	Dartree	Aghabog	Cootehill
Cornawall	194	Dartree	Ematris	Cootehill
Cornawall	205	Dartree	Killeevan	Monaghan
Cornecassa Demesne	467	Monaghan	Monaghan	Monaghan
Corness	99	Monaghan	Monaghan	Monaghan
Corrabofin	181	Monaghan	Ballybay	Castleblayney
Corracharra	329	Cremorne	Aghnamullen	Carrickmacross
Corrachulter	111	Dartree	Aghabog	Cootehill
Corrackan	113	Dartree	Currin	Clones
Corracloghan	147	Cremorne	Clontibret	Castleblayney
Corracrin	45	Trough	Donagh	Monaghan
Corragarry	244	Dartree	Currin	Cootehill
Corragarry	178	Dartree	Ematris	Cootehill
Corragarry (or Sruell)	311	Farney	Donaghmoyne	Castleblayney
Corragarta	206	Cremorne	Clontibret	Castleblayney
Corragh (Maxwell)	49	Trough	Donagh	Monaghan
Corraghbrack	70	Trough	Donagh	Monaghan
Corraghdown	159	Trough	Donagh	Monaghan
Corraghduff	126	Trough	Donagh	Monaghan
Corragore	161	Dartree	Ematris	Cootehill
Corrakeen	133	Cremorne	Clontibret	Castleblayney
Corramegan	152	Dartree	Aghabog	Monaghan
Corranewy	211	Dartree	Ematris	Cootehill
Corraskea	221	Dartree	Killeevan	Clones
Corraskea	260	Cremorne	Aghnamullen	Cootehill
Corraskeally	77	Monaghan	Tehallan	Monaghan
Corrataghart	149	Monaghan	Drumsnat	Monaghan
Corratanty	453	Cremorne	Muckno	Castleblayney
Corrateean	143	Farney	Donaghmoyne	Castleblayney
Corrateemore	77	Farney	Donaghmoyne	Carrickmacross
Corratrasna	155	Monaghan	Clones	Monaghan
Corravacan	188	Dartree	Ematris	Cootehill
Corravilla	168	Dartree	Aghabog	Cootehill
Corraviller	109	Monaghan	Tullycorbet	Monaghan
Corravoo	269	Farney	Donaghmoyne	Castleblayney
Corrawillin	68	Monaghan	Tehallan	Monaghan
Correvan	211	Dartree	Aghabog	Cootehill
Corrinary	105	Farney	Donaghmoyne	Castleblayney
Corrinary	188	Dartree	Currin	Cootehill
Corrinenty	344	Farney	Magheross	Carrickmacross
Corrinshigagh	183	Farney	Donaghmoyne	Carrickmacross
Corrinshigagh	151	Farney	Magheross	Carrickmacross
Corrinshigagh (Cope)	106	Farney	Donaghmoyne	Carrickmacross
Corrinshigo	182	Cremorne	Clontibret	Castleblayney
Corrinshigo	293	Dartree	Currin	Cootehill
Corrinshigo	78	Monaghan	Clones	Monaghan
Corrinshigo	75	Monaghan	Monaghan	Monaghan
Corrinshigo	95	Monaghan	Tedavnet	Monaghan
Corrintra	456	Cremorne	Muckno	Castleblayney
Corry	54	Trough	Errigal Trough	Clogher
Corryagan	125	Farney	Magheracloone	Carrickmacross
Corryarbeg	367	Trough	Errigal Trough	Clogher
Corrybrackan	278	Farney	Magheracloone	Carrickmacross
Corrybrannan	228	Cremorne	Ballybay	Castleblayney
Corryhagan	236	Cremorne	Aghnamullen	Cootehill
Corryloan	162	Cremorne	Clontibret	Castleblayney
Corsilloga	190	Cremorne	Aghnamullen	Cootehill
Cortaghart	335	Cremorne	Aghnamullen	Castleblayney
Cortamlet	64	Cremorne	Aghnamullen	Cootehill
Cortober	205	Cremorne	Aghnamullen	Carrickmacross
Cortober	61	Farney	Magheracloone	Carrickmacross
Cortober	181	Dartree	Currin	Cootehill
Cortober	225	Dartree	Ematris	Cootehill
Cortolvin	108	Monaghan	Monaghan	Monaghan
Cortreane	89	Dartree	Currin	Cootehill
Corvackan	304	Cremorne	Aghnamullen	Cootehill
Corvaghan	172	Dartree	Drummully	Clones
Corvally	356	Farney	Magheross	Carrickmacross
Corvally	164	Monaghan	Tehallan	Monaghan
Corvally	236	Monaghan	Tullycorbet	Monaghan
Corvoam	128	Monaghan	Kilmore	Monaghan
Corvoy	222	Monaghan	Tullycorbet	Monaghan
Corwillin	229	Cremorne	Aghnamullen	Cootehill
Crane Island	1	Cremorne	Clontibret	Castleblayney
Crane Island	1	Cremorne	Muckno	Castleblayney
Crappagh	174	Dartree	Aghabog	Cootehill
Creaghan	64	Trough	Errigal Trough	Clogher
Creaghanroe	195	Cremorne	Muckno	Castleblayney
Creeran	169	Dartree	Currin	Cootehill
Creesil	121	Monaghan	Tedavnet	Monaghan
Creevagh	212	Cremorne	Tullycorbet	Monaghan
Creevaghy	109	Dartree	Clones	Clones
Creeve	684	Cremorne	Aghnamullen	Castleblayney
Creeve	184	Cremorne	Clontibret	Monaghan
Creeve	158	Monaghan	Monaghan	Monaghan
Creevelea	213	Dartree	Clones	Clones
Creevelea	109	Trough	Donagh	Monaghan
Creevy (Oliver)	102	Farney	Donaghmoyne	Carrickmacross
Creevy (Swinburn)	68	Farney	Donaghmoyne	Carrickmacross
Creighans	118	Monaghan	Tehallan	Monaghan
Cremartin	212	Cremorne	Clontibret	Castleblayney
Cremoyle	208	Dartree	Ematris	Cootehill
Creveadornan	96	Farney	Magheracloone	Carrickmacross
Crewmeige	154	Monaghan	Kilmore	Monaghan
Crinkill	127	Cremorne	Clontibret	Castleblayney
Croaghan	509	Cremorne	Clontibret	Castleblayney
Crockcumberland	78	Dartree	Clones	Monaghan
Crossaghy	145	Cremorne	Clontibret	Monaghan
Crossalare	135	Farney	Donaghmoyne	Carrickmacross
Crossbane	239	Dartree	Killeevan	Clones
Crossduff	215	Cremorne	Aghnamullen	Castleblayney
Crosses	272	Monaghan	Monaghan	Monaghan
Crosses	107	Monaghan	Tedavnet	Monaghan
Crosshugh	164	Monaghan	Monaghan	Monaghan
Crosslea	134	Dartree	Ematris	Cootehill
Crossmore	260	Cremorne	Clontibret	Monaghan
Crossmoyle	82	Dartree	Clones	Clones
Crossnacaldoo	418	Trough	Errigal Trough	Clogher
Crossreagh	239	Dartree	Killeevan	Clones
Crover	89	Farney	Donaghmoyne	Carrickmacross
Crover	128	Dartree	Aghabog	Cootehill
Crowey	66	Monaghan	Tehallan	Monaghan
Crumlin	266	Farney	Magheracloone	Carrickmacross
Crumlin	116	Monaghan	Kilmore	Monaghan
Crumlin	176	Monaghan	Tehallan	Monaghan
Culdaloo	54	Monaghan	Tehallan	Monaghan
Cullentraghbane	103	Farney	Donaghmoyne	Carrickmacross
Cullentraghduff	127	Farney	Donaghmoyne	Carrickmacross
Cumry	194	Cremorne	Aghnamullen	Cootehill
Curkin	67	Trough	Errigal Trough	Monaghan
Cussaboy	64	Monaghan	Tullycorbet	Monaghan
Cussee	73	Monaghan	Tedavnet	Monaghan
Darraghlan	193	Monaghan	Kilmore	Monaghan
Davagh	32	Dartree	Killeevan	Clones
Davagh Etra	140	Trough	Errigal Trough	Monaghan
Davagh Otra	137	Trough	Errigal Trough	Monaghan
Dawson Grove Demesne	597	Dartree	Ematris	Cootehill
Dernacoo	56	Trough	Errigal Trough	Monaghan
Dernadriff	164	Trough	Errigal Trough	Clogher
Dernaglug	147	Cremorne	Clontibret	Castleblayney
Dernagola	149	Trough	Errigal Trough	Clogher
Dernahamsha	29	Monaghan	Clones	Monaghan
Dernahatten	115	Trough	Errigal Trough	Monaghan
Dernahinch	106	Trough	Errigal Trough	Monaghan
Dernalosset	246	Trough	Errigal Trough	Monaghan
Dernamoyle	276	Dartree	Ematris	Cootehill
Dernamuck	48	Trough	Errigal Trough	Monaghan
Dernaroy	84	Dartree	Aghabog	Cootehill
Dernaved	208	Trough	Errigal Trough	Clogher
Derrilla	244	Trough	Donagh	Monaghan
Derrins	192	Dartree	Currin	Cootehill
Derrintonny	88	Monaghan	Clones	Monaghan
Derry	244	Farney	Magheracloone	Carrickmacross
Derry	138	Cremorne	Aghnamullen	Cootehill
Derry	97	Monaghan	Tehallan	Monaghan
Derryallaghan	175	Monaghan	Tedavnet	Monaghan
Derryarrilly	251	Cremorne	Clontibret	Monaghan
Derryarrit	260	Monaghan	Clones	Monaghan
Derryartry	69	Monaghan	Clones	Monaghan
Derrybeg	53	Dartree	Drummully	Clones
Derrycreevy	148	Cremorne	Muckno	Castleblayney
Derrycrossan	168	Monaghan	Tedavnet	Monaghan
Derrydorraghy	124	Monaghan	Tedavnet	Monaghan
Derrygassan Lower	114	Trough	Donagh	Monaghan
Derrygassan Upper	117	Trough	Donagh	Monaghan
Derrygola	273	Trough	Errigal Trough	Monaghan
Derrygoony	283	Cremorne	Aghnamullen	Cootehill
Derrygorry	184	Trough	Errigal Trough	Clogher
Derryhallagh	152	Trough	Donagh	Monaghan
Derryhallagh	298	Monaghan	Tullycorbet	Monaghan
Derryhee	87	Trough	Donagh	Monaghan
Derryhellan	100	Trough	Errigal Trough	Monaghan
Derryhoosh	101	Trough	Donagh	Monaghan
Derryilan (or Knocknamullagh)	212	Farney	Donaghmoyne	Carrickmacross
Derryisland	194	Cremorne	Clontibret	Castleblayney
Derrykinard	114	Dartree	Ematris	Cootehill
Derrykinard	73	Trough	Errigal Trough	Monaghan
Derrykinnigh Beg	183	Trough	Errigal Trough	Clogher
Derrykinnigh More	194	Trough	Errigal Trough	Clogher
Derrylavan	218	Farney	Magheross	Carrickmacross
Derrylea	146	Monaghan	Clones	Monaghan
Derrylea	126	Trough	Donagh	Monaghan
Derrylea Beg	105	Trough	Errigal Trough	Clogher
Derrylea More	112	Trough	Errigal Trough	Clogher
Derryleedigan	160	Monaghan	Clones	Monaghan
Derryleedigan (Jackson)	93	Monaghan	Clones	Monaghan
Derryleeg	149	Farney	Magheracloone	Carrickmacross
Derryleggan	16	Dartree	Killeevan	Clones
Derrylevick	95	Trough	Errigal Trough	Clogher
Derrylosset	170	Dartree	Ematris	Cootehill
Derrylusk	134	Monaghan	Clones	Monaghan
Derrylusk	181	Monaghan	Tullycorbet	Monaghan
Derrynagad	108	Monaghan	Tedavnet	Monaghan
Derrynaglah	278	Farney	Magheracloone	Carrickmacross
Derrynagrew	108	Monaghan	Tedavnet	Monaghan
Derrynahesco	496	Monaghan	Tedavnet	Monaghan
Derrynaloobinagh	197	Cremorne	Ballybay	Castleblayney
Derrynanamph	233	Monaghan	Tedavnet	Monaghan
Derrynarget	50	Trough	Errigal Trough	Clogher
Derrynascobe	164	Farney	Magheracloone	Carrickmacross
Derrynasell East	263	Monaghan	Tedavnet	Monaghan
Derrynasell West	455	Monaghan	Tedavnet	Monaghan
Derrynashallog	168	Trough	Donagh	Monaghan
Derryolam	190	Farney	Magheross	Carrickmacross
Derryrellan	163	Trough	Errigal Trough	Clogher
Derryroosk	141	Cremorne	Aghnamullen	Cootehill
Derryvally	234	Cremorne	Ballybay	Castleblayney
Derryveagh	241	Trough	Errigal Trough	Monaghan
Derryveen	195	Trough	Donagh	Monaghan
Descart	226	Farney	Magheracloone	Carrickmacross
Descart	136	Dartree	Aghabog	Cootehill
Desert	105	Trough	Donagh	Monaghan
Devlin	136	Cremorne	Clontibret	Castleblayney
Dian	115	Farney	Donaghmoyne	Carrickmacross
Doagh	322	Farney	Magheracloone	Carrickmacross
Doagheys	96	Trough	Donagh	Monaghan
Donagh	131	Trough	Donagh	Monaghan
Donaghmoyne	569	Farney	Donaghmoyne	Carrickmacross
Doocharn	210	Cremorne	Muckno	Castleblayney
Doogary	228	Monaghan	Tedavnet	Monaghan
Doohamlat	138	Cremorne	Clontibret	Castleblayney
Doohat	249	Dartree	Aghabog	Cootehill
Doohatty	456	Farney	Magheracloone	Carrickmacross
Dooraa	172	Farney	Donaghmoyne	Carrickmacross
Dooraa	265	Cremorne	Aghnamullen	Castleblayney
Doosky	196	Cremorne	Clontibret	Monaghan
Doosky	233	Dartree	Killeevan	Monaghan
Downs	90	Cremorne	Clontibret	Monaghan
Drollagh	308	Cremorne	Muckno	Castleblayney
Drollagh	160	Dartree	Aghabog	Cootehill
Dromore	360	Cremorne	Muckno	Castleblayney
Dromore	113	Trough	Errigal Trough	Clogher
Dromore	84	Farney	Inishkeen	Dundalk
Dromore	147	Cremorne	Clontibret	Monaghan
Dromore	117	Monaghan	Tehallan	Monaghan
Dromore	325	Cremorne	Tullycorbet	Monaghan
Dromore East	162	Dartree	Ematris	Cootehill
Dromore West	52	Dartree	Ematris	Cootehill
**Drum**	Town	Dartree	Currin	Cootehill
Drum	144	Dartree	Currin	Cootehill
Drumacaslan	118	Monaghan	Kilmore	Monaghan
Drumaclan	177	Monaghan	Kilmore	Monaghan
Drumacon	511	Cremorne	Muckno	Castleblayney
Drumaconvern	163	Farney	Donaghmoyne	Carrickmacross
Drumacoon	97	Dartree	Killeevan	Clones
Drumacreeve	137	Dartree	Aghabog	Cootehill
Drumacreeve	144	Dartree	Ematris	Cootehill
Drumacrib	237	Cremorne	Muckno	Castleblayney
Drumacruttan	146	Monaghan	Monaghan	Monaghan
Drumacruttan	37	Monaghan	Tehallan	Monaghan
Drumaddagorry	109	Dartree	Clones	Clones
Drumaddarainy	144	Dartree	Clones	Clones
Drumagelvin	237	Cremorne	Muckno	Castleblayney
Drumagelvin	201	Monaghan	Tehallan	Monaghan
Drumaghakeel	116	Dartree	Aghabog	Cootehill
Drumakill	322	Cremorne	Muckno	Castleblayney
Drumaliss	329	Cremorne	Muckno	Castleblayney
Drumalt	137	Monaghan	Kilmore	Monaghan
Drumanan	109	Dartree	Aghabog	Cootehill
Drumanny	221	Dartree	Ematris	Cootehill
Drumar	181	Cremorne	Ballybay	Castleblayney
Drumard	82	Dartree	Clones	Clones
Drumarrell	94	Trough	Errigal Trough	Monaghan
Drumartigan	96	Trough	Errigal Trough	Clogher
Drumary	161	Dartree	Aghabog	Cootehill
Drumass	401	Farney	Inishkeen	Dundalk
Drumate	176	Dartree	Aghabog	Cootehill
Drumavaddy	145	Farney	Donaghmoyne	Castleblayney
Drumavaddy	122	Dartree	Currin	Cootehill
Drumavan	163	Dartree	Currin	Clones
Drumavcale	93	Dartree	Currin	Clones
Drumbanagher	172	Trough	Donagh	Monaghan
Drumbaragh	179	Dartree	Aghabog	Clones
Drumbarnet	87	Monaghan	Tedavnet	Monaghan
Drumbear	143	Monaghan	Monaghan	Monaghan
Drumbenagh	138	Monaghan	Tedavnet	Monaghan
Drumbeo	188	Cremorne	Clontibret	Monaghan
Drumberagh	340	Farney	Donaghmoyne	Carrickmacross
Drumbier	166	Monaghan	Tedavnet	Monaghan
Drumbin	153	Monaghan	Tedavnet	Monaghan
Drumbirn	121	Trough	Errigal Trough	Clogher
Drumbo	191	Farney	Magheracloone	Carrickmacross
Drumboat	486	Farney	Inishkeen	Dundalk
Drumboory	556	Farney	Magheracloone	Carrickmacross
Drumborisk	238	Dartree	Currin	Cootehill
Drumbrackan	219	Farney	Magheracloone	Carrickmacross
Drumbrean	268	Dartree	Aghabog	Cootehill
Drumbristan	324	Trough	Errigal Trough	Clogher
Drumbroagh	187	Farney	Magheross	Carrickmacross
Drumbrone	126	Farney	Magheracloone	Carrickmacross
Drumbure	100	Dartree	Currin	Clones
Drumcah	185	Farney	Inishkeen	Dundalk
Drumcall	233	Dartree	Ematris	Cootehill
Drumcanon	323	Cremorne	Aghnamullen	Cootehill
Drumcargy	160	Farney	Magheracloone	Carrickmacross
Drumcarrow	232	Farney	Magheracloone	Carrickmacross
Drumcattan	129	Farney	Donaghmoyne	Carrickmacross
Drumcaw	153	Dartree	Killeevan	Clones
Drumcaw	264	Trough	Donagh	Monaghan
Drumcondra	82	Trough	Errigal Trough	Monaghan
Drumconnelly	150	Trough	Errigal Trough	Monaghan
Drumcoo (Brady)	220	Monaghan	Tedavnet	Monaghan
Drumcoo (Foster)	175	Monaghan	Tedavnet	Monaghan
Drumcoo (Jackson)	138	Monaghan	Tedavnet	Monaghan
Drumcoo (Woods)	74	Monaghan	Tedavnet	Monaghan
Drumcreeghan	205	Cremorne	Aghnamullen	Castleblayney
Drumcrew	222	Cremorne	Clontibret	Castleblayney
Drumcrow	122	Dartree	Killeevan	Cootehill
Drumcru (Dickson)	88	Dartree	Clones	Clones
Drumcru (Remwick)	93	Dartree	Clones	Clones
Drumcunnion	439	Cremorne	Aghnamullen	Carrickmacross
Drumdart	155	Monaghan	Tedavnet	Monaghan
Drumdesco	136	Monaghan	Tedavnet	Monaghan
Drumdreeny	114	Farney	Donaghmoyne	Carrickmacross
Drumee	122	Dartree	Killeevan	Clones
Drumerlough Beg	141	Farney	Magheracloone	Carrickmacross
Drumerlough More	134	Farney	Magheracloone	Carrickmacross
Drumever	193	Farney	Killanny	Carrickmacross
Drumfaldra	81	Cremorne	Aghnamullen	Cootehill
Drumfernasky	139	Trough	Errigal Trough	Clogher
Drumfurrer	540	Trough	Errigal Trough	Clogher
Drumgaghan	132	Trough	Donagh	Monaghan
Drumgallan	186	Cremorne	Clontibret	Castleblayney
Drumganny	153	Farney	Donaghmoyne	Carrickmacross
Drumganus Lower	163	Farney	Donaghmoyne	Castleblayney
Drumganus Upper	156	Farney	Donaghmoyne	Castleblayney
Drumgarkin	155	Dartree	Ematris	Cootehill
Drumgarly	184	Dartree	Aghabog	Clones
Drumgarn	50	Trough	Donagh	Monaghan
Drumgarra	345	Cremorne	Ballybay	Castleblayney
Drumgarran	68	Dartree	Currin	Clones
Drumgarran	84	Monaghan	Tedavnet	Monaghan
Drumgarve	120	Monaghan	Drumsnat	Monaghan
Drumgavny	211	Cremorne	Tullycorbet	Monaghan
Drumgaze	133	Dartree	Currin	Cootehill
Drumgeeny	255	Farney	Killanny	Carrickmacross
Drumgeeny	186	Trough	Donagh	Monaghan
Drumgoan	119	Farney	Magheross	Carrickmacross
Drumgoask	142	Monaghan	Tedavnet	Monaghan
Drumgoast	136	Monaghan	Clones	Monaghan
Drumgolat	148	Cremorne	Clontibret	Monaghan
Drumgole	167	Dartree	Ematris	Cootehill
Drumgoole	90	Monaghan	Tehallan	Monaghan
Drumgoosat	196	Farney	Magheracloone	Carrickmacross
Drumgoose	267	Farney	Donaghmoyne	Castleblayney
Drumgor	327	Cremorne	Aghnamullen	Castleblayney
Drumgowna	346	Farney	Magheross	Carrickmacross
Drumgramph	121	Dartree	Aghabog	Cootehill
Drumgramph	87	Dartree	Currin	Cootehill
Drumgreeny	146	Monaghan	Kilmore	Monaghan
Drumgristin	158	Cremorne	Clontibret	Castleblayney
Drumgristin	88	Dartree	Aghabog	Cootehill
Drumgristin Lower	128	Farney	Donaghmoyne	Castleblayney
Drumgristin Upper	198	Farney	Donaghmoyne	Carrickmacross
Drumgrole	288	Cremorne	Ballybay	Castleblayney
Drumgrone	205	Dartree	Currin	Cootehill
Drumguff	37	Dartree	Killeevan	Clones
Drumguill	174	Monaghan	Drumsnat	Monaghan
Drumguillew Lower	147	Cremorne	Ballybay	Castleblayney
Drumguillew Upper	150	Cremorne	Ballybay	Castleblayney
Drumguilly	111	Dartree	Killeevan	Monaghan
Drumgurra	417	Farney	Magheross	Carrickmacross
Drumhaman	127	Farney	Donaghmoyne	Carrickmacross
Drumharriff	171	Farney	Donaghmoyne	Carrickmacross
Drumharriff North	173	Farney	Donaghmoyne	Castleblayney
Drumhasket	74	Farney	Killanny	Carrickmacross
Drumhawan	327	Cremorne	Ballybay	Castleblayney
Drumhay	160	Dartree	Aghabog	Cootehill
Drumhillagh	142	Farney	Donaghmoyne	Carrickmacross
Drumhillagh	132	Cremorne	Aghnamullen	Castleblayney
Drumhillagh	232	Cremorne	Ballybay	Castleblayney
Drumhillagh	97	Dartree	Currin	Clones
Drumhillagh	276	Dartree	Killeevan	Monaghan
Drumhillagh	229	Monaghan	Tedavnet	Monaghan
Drumhirk	280	Dartree	Aghabog	Monaghan
Drumhirk	107	Monaghan	Monaghan	Monaghan
Drumilkin	84	Dartree	Aghabog	Cootehill
Drumillard	122	Farney	Donaghmoyne	Carrickmacross
Drumillard	267	Cremorne	Aghnamullen	Castleblayney
Drumillard Big	221	Cremorne	Muckno	Castleblayney
Drumillard Little	71	Cremorne	Muckno	Castleblayney
Druminane	289	Monaghan	Tedavnet	Monaghan
Drumintin	263	Dartree	Ematris	Cootehill
Drumirril	279	Farney	Inishkeen	Dundalk
Drumlandrick	124	Farney	Donaghmoyne	Castleblayney
Drumlane	248	Cremorne	Ballybay	Castleblayney
Drumlara	63	Monaghan	Tedavnet	Monaghan
Drumleek North	264	Cremorne	Muckno	Castleblayney
Drumleek South	334	Cremorne	Muckno	Castleblayney
Drumleny	220	Dartree	Killeevan	Monaghan
Drumlester	118	Trough	Errigal Trough	Clogher
Drumlina	119	Dartree	Killeevan	Cootehill
Drumlinny	230	Dartree	Aghabog	Monaghan
Drumlinny	80	Monaghan	Kilmore	Monaghan
Drumlish	60	Monaghan	Tedavnet	Monaghan
Drumlona	105	Dartree	Ematris	Cootehill
Drumlongfield	214	Monaghan	Tullycorbet	Monaghan
Drumloo	137	Monaghan	Clones	Monaghan
Drumloo North	25	Dartree	Killeevan	Clones
Drumloo South	27	Dartree	Killeevan	Clones
Drumlood	225	Cremorne	Aghnamullen	Cootehill
Drumloughlin	142	Dartree	Ematris	Cootehill
Drumlurg	230	Farney	Donaghmoyne	Carrickmacross
Drumlusty	181	Farney	Donaghmoyne	Carrickmacross
Drummacavoy	171	Farney	Donaghmoyne	Carrickmacross
Drummaconor	132	Monaghan	Kilmore	Monaghan
Drummanreagh	139	Farney	Donaghmoyne	Carrickmacross
Drummans	264	Monaghan	Clones	Monaghan
Drummond	344	Farney	Magheracloone	Carrickmacross
Drummond	198	Farney	Inishkeen	Dundalk
Drummond Etra	66	Farney	Magheross	Carrickmacross
Drummond Otra	298	Farney	Magheross	Carrickmacross
Drummuck	168	Cremorne	Ballybay	Castleblayney
Drummuck	149	Monaghan	Kilmore	Monaghan
Drummuck	84	Cremorne	Tehallan	Monaghan
Drummulla	172	Dartree	Ematris	Cootehill
Drummullan	121	Dartree	Aghabog	Clones
Drummully	90	Dartree	Clones	Clones
Drummully	144	Trough	Donagh	Monaghan
Drumnagavlin	47	Monaghan	Clones	Monaghan
Drumnagrella	212	Farney	Inishkeen	Dundalk
Drumnahunshin	86	Cremorne	Tehallan	Monaghan
Drumnanaliv	133	Farney	Donaghmoyne	Carrickmacross
Drumnart	106	Cremorne	Clontibret	Monaghan
Drumneill	133	Farney	Donaghmoyne	Carrickmacross
Drumneill	205	Cremorne	Clontibret	Monaghan
Drumnolan	120	Trough	Donagh	Monaghan
Drumny	88	Farney	Donaghmoyne	Carrickmacross
Drumod	424	Cremorne	Aghnamullen	Cootehill
Drumquill	227	Cremorne	Clontibret	Castleblayney
Drumreask	119	Monaghan	Tedavnet	Monaghan
Drumreenagh	132	Dartree	Currin	Clones
Drumreenagh	172	Dartree	Killeevan	Clones
Drumrooghill	247	Dartree	Ematris	Cootehill
Drumroosk	191	Monaghan	Tullycorbet	Monaghan
Drumrutagh	203	Monaghan	Tehallan	Monaghan
Drumsaul	75	Dartree	Ematris	Cootehill
Drumscor	149	Monaghan	Tedavnet	Monaghan
Drumshannon	149	Dartree	Aghabog	Clones
Drumshanny	164	Monaghan	Tedavnet	Monaghan
Drumsheaver	309	Monaghan	Tedavnet	Monaghan
Drumsheeny	58	Trough	Donagh	Monaghan
Drumsheeny	238	Monaghan	Drumsnat	Monaghan
Drumskelt	261	Cremorne	Aghnamullen	Cootehill
Drumskelt	195	Dartree	Killeevan	Cootehill
Drumslavog	78	Monaghan	Tedavnet	Monaghan
Drumsloe	120	Dartree	Drummully	Clones
Drumswords	117	Dartree	Killeevan	Clones
Drumturk	158	Farney	Killanny	Carrickmacross
Drumturk	139	Trough	Errigal Trough	Monaghan
Drumummery	106	Monaghan	Clones	Monaghan
Drumurcher	172	Dartree	Currin	Cootehill
Dunaldron	77	Monaghan	Monaghan	Monaghan
Dunanny	145	Farney	Donaghmoyne	Carrickmacross
Dunaree	299	Farney	Donaghmoyne	Carrickmacross
Dunaree Latin	340	Farney	Donaghmoyne	Carrickmacross
Dundian	145	Trough	Errigal Trough	Monaghan
Dundonagh	173	Trough	Donagh	Monaghan
Dundrannan	167	Dartree	Ematris	Cootehill
Dundrockan	138	Farney	Donaghmoyne	Carrickmacross
Dundrumman	219	Monaghan	Clones	Monaghan
Dunelty	173	Farney	Killanny	Carrickmacross
Dunfelimy	235	Cremorne	Clontibret	Castleblayney
Dungillick	158	Trough	Errigal Trough	Monaghan
Dungonnan	51	Dartree	Currin	Clones
Dunmadigan	64	Trough	Errigal Trough	Monaghan
Dunmakenna	201	Cremorne	Aghnamullen	Cootehill
Dunmaurice	258	Cremorne	Ballybay	Castleblayney
Dunnaluck	175	Dartree	Currin	Cootehill
Dunoge	165	Farney	Magheross	Carrickmacross
Dunraymond	120	Monaghan	Kilmore	Monaghan
Dunseark	145	Dartree	Killeevan	Clones
Dunsinare	136	Monaghan	Monaghan	Monaghan
Dunsrim	197	Dartree	Currin	Clones
Dyan	32	Dartree	Ematris	Cootehill
Dyan	57	Dartree	Killeevan	Monaghan
Eden Island	118	Trough	Donagh	Monaghan
Edenaferkin	192	Cremorne	Tullycorbet	Monaghan
Edenaforan	127	Dartree	Clones	Clones
Edenagoash	122	Dartree	Killeevan	Monaghan
Edenamo	86	Farney	Inishkeen	Dundalk
Edenanay	125	Cremorne	Ballybay	Castleblayney
Edenaneane	246	Cremorne	Ballybay	Castleblayney
Edenbrone	129	Cremorne	Aghnamullen	Cootehill
Edenbrone	36	Monaghan	Monaghan	Monaghan
Edenbrone	67	Monaghan	Tedavnet	Monaghan
Edenforan	209	Cremorne	Aghnamullen	Cootehill
Edengilrevy	181	Farney	Donaghmoyne	Carrickmacross
Edenmore	69	Trough	Errigal Trough	Clogher
Edenmore	110	Trough	Donagh	Monaghan
Edergole	156	Dartree	Ematris	Cootehill
Effernagh	140	Dartree	Aghabog	Clones
Eldron	58	Monaghan	Drumsnat	Monaghan
Ellinure	129	Dartree	Killeevan	Clones
Elvey	96	Trough	Errigal Trough	Monaghan
Emy	252	Trough	Donagh	Monaghan
**Emyvale**	Town	Trough	Donagh	Monaghan
Emyvale (or Scarnageeragh)	119	Trough	Donagh	Monaghan
Enagh	253	Farney	Magheracloone	Carrickmacross
Enagh	171	Dartree	Ematris	Cootehill
Enagh	131	Trough	Donagh	Monaghan
Ennis	78	Cremorne	Clontibret	Monaghan
Errybane	135	Cremorne	Muckno	Castleblayney
Erryroe	294	Cremorne	Muckno	Castleblayney
Eshacrin	141	Monaghan	Tedavnet	Monaghan
Eshcloghfin	309	Monaghan	Tedavnet	Monaghan
Eshnaglogh	1,341	Monaghan	Tedavnet	Monaghan
Esker	105	Trough	Errigal Trough	Clogher
Fairfield Demesne	642	Dartree	Ematris	Cootehill
Fairtahy	308	Cremorne	Aghnamullen	Carrickmacross
Faltagh	231	Dartree	Aghabog	Cootehill
Faraghy	199	Farney	Magheross	Carrickmacross
Fartagorman	124	Farney	Magheross	Carrickmacross
Fastry	144	Dartree	Currin	Clones
Fastry (or Racreeghan)	284	Dartree	Ematris	Cootehill
Faulkland	226	Trough	Donagh	Monaghan
Feagh	240	Dartree	Aghabog	Cootehill
Feahoe	284	Farney	Magheracloone	Carrickmacross
Feddans	127	Cremorne	Clontibret	Monaghan
Fedoo	165	Monaghan	Tehallan	Monaghan
Feebaghbane	218	Monaghan	Tedavnet	Monaghan
Feebaghduff	143	Monaghan	Tedavnet	Monaghan
Feebane	86	Monaghan	Monaghan	Monaghan
Feegavla	263	Farney	Donaghmoyne	Carrickmacross
Feragh	275	Monaghan	Monaghan	Monaghan
Figanny	103	Trough	Errigal Trough	Monaghan
Figullar	264	Trough	Errigal Trough	Monaghan
Fincarn	229	Farney	Donaghmoyne	Castleblayney
Fintully	139	Cremorne	Clontibret	Monaghan
Foremass	106	Monaghan	Tedavnet	Monaghan
Formil	308	Cremorne	Aghnamullen	Castleblayney
Formil	187	Cremorne	Clontibret	Castleblayney
Formil	133	Cremorne	Muckno	Castleblayney
Formoyle	146	Monaghan	Tedavnet	Monaghan
Foxhole	34	Trough	Donagh	Monaghan
Freame Mount Demesne	199	Dartree	Ematris	Cootehill
Fremagh	54	Dartree	Killeevan	Clones
Gallagh	184	Cremorne	Clontibret	Monaghan
Gallanagh	129	Monaghan	Monaghan	Monaghan
Garlegobban	90	Farney	Killanny	Carrickmacross
Garradevlin	118	Cremorne	Clontibret	Castleblayney
Garran	166	Dartree	Clones	Clones
Garran	218	Dartree	Aghabog	Monaghan
Garran Itra	175	Monaghan	Tehallan	Monaghan
Garran Otra (or Gibraltar)	131	Monaghan	Tehallan	Monaghan
Garranroe	70	Monaghan	Kilmore	Monaghan
Garranroe (or Cornamucklagh)	193	Farney	Donaghmoyne	Carrickmacross
Garrifly	77	Farney	Donaghmoyne	Carrickmacross
Garrybane	158	Cremorne	Aghnamullen	Castleblayney
Garryduff	242	Cremorne	Aghnamullen	Castleblayney
Genagh	196	Dartree	Aghabog	Clones
Gibraltar (or Garran Otra)	131	Monaghan	Tehallan	Monaghan
Gilford	92	Monaghan	Tedavnet	Monaghan
Girfin	25	Trough	Errigal Trough	Clogher
Glannan	46	Trough	Donagh	Monaghan
Glasdrumman	168	Monaghan	Tedavnet	Monaghan
Glasdrumman East	174	Cremorne	Clontibret	Castleblayney
Glasdrumman West	100	Cremorne	Clontibret	Monaghan
Glasdrummond	223	Dartree	Killeevan	Monaghan
Glasleck	190	Trough	Donagh	Monaghan
**Glaslough**	Town	Trough	Donagh	Monaghan
Glaslough	190	Trough	Donagh	Monaghan
Glasmullagh	167	Trough	Errigal Trough	Monaghan
Glear	125	Dartree	Clones	Clones
Glebe	68	Trough	Errigal Trough	Monaghan
Glen	100	Dartree	Aghabog	Cootehill
Glen	288	Dartree	Ematris	Cootehill
Glen Beg	191	Trough	Errigal Trough	Clogher
Glen More	212	Trough	Errigal Trough	Clogher
Glencorick	140	Dartree	Ematris	Cootehill
Glenish	143	Monaghan	Kilmore	Monaghan
Glennyhorn	117	Cremorne	Clontibret	Monaghan
Glinch	116	Dartree	Aghabog	Clones
Gola	36	Monaghan	Clones	Monaghan
Gola English	268	Monaghan	Tedavnet	Monaghan
Gola Irish	228	Monaghan	Tedavnet	Monaghan
Golan	523	Trough	Donagh	Monaghan
Golanduff	64	Dartree	Killeevan	Clones
Golanmurphy	94	Dartree	Killeevan	Monaghan
Golree	46	Monaghan	Tehallan	Monaghan
Gortakeeghan	149	Monaghan	Monaghan	Monaghan
Gorteens	119	Farney	Donaghmoyne	Castleblayney
Gortgranard	146	Dartree	Killeevan	Clones
Gorticleave	70	Trough	Errigal Trough	Monaghan
Gortlanna	92	Cremorne	Aghnamullen	Cootehill
Gortmoney	21	Trough	Donagh	Monaghan
Gortmore North	136	Monaghan	Drumsnat	Monaghan
Gortmore South	95	Monaghan	Drumsnat	Monaghan
Gortnana	114	Dartree	Killeevan	Clones
Gortnana	141	Monaghan	Kilmore	Monaghan
Gortnawinny	185	Dartree	Clones	Clones
Graffagh	125	Monaghan	Tedavnet	Monaghan
Gragarnagh	214	Cremorne	Aghnamullen	Castleblayney
Gransha Beg	250	Dartree	Clones	Clones
Gransha More	220	Dartree	Clones	Clones
Greagh	386	Cremorne	Ballybay	Castleblayney
Greagh	345	Trough	Errigal Trough	Clogher
Greagh	241	Monaghan	Drumsnat	Monaghan
Greagh	147	Monaghan	Tedavnet	Monaghan
Greaghawillin (Jackson)	117	Farney	Magheracloone	Carrickmacross
Greaghawillin (Richey)	135	Farney	Magheracloone	Carrickmacross
Greaghdrumit	174	Farney	Magheross	Carrickmacross
Greaghdrumneesk	141	Farney	Magheross	Carrickmacross
Greaghglass	186	Monaghan	Monaghan	Monaghan
Greaghlane	266	Farney	Magheross	Carrickmacross
Greaghlatacapple	350	Farney	Magheross	Carrickmacross
Greaghlone	449	Farney	Magheracloone	Carrickmacross
Greaghnaroog	232	Farney	Magheross	Carrickmacross
Greenmount	97	Cremorne	Clontibret	Monaghan
Grig	191	Cremorne	Clontibret	Castleblayney
Griggy	133	Trough	Donagh	Monaghan
Groves Lower	117	Cremorne	Tehallan	Monaghan
Groves Upper	122	Cremorne	Tehallan	Monaghan
Guardhill	105	Dartree	Killeevan	Clones
Halftate	73	Farney	Magheracloone	Carrickmacross
Hillhall	146	Trough	Donagh	Monaghan
Hilton Demesne	542	Dartree	Currin	Clones
Inishammon	142	Monaghan	Clones	Monaghan
Inishdevlin	90	Trough	Donagh	Monaghan
Inishkeen Glebe	69	Farney	Inishkeen	Dundalk
Islands	148	Monaghan	Tedavnet	Monaghan
Itereery	123	Monaghan	Tedavnet	Monaghan
Ivy Hill	92	Trough	Errigal Trough	Clogher
Kednaminsha	201	Farney	Donaghmoyne	Carrickmacross
Kednugullion	171	Farney	Donaghmoyne	Castleblayney
Keeneraboy	165	Farney	Donaghmoyne	Carrickmacross
Keenog	111	Monaghan	Drumsnat	Monaghan
Keenogbane	139	Cremorne	Aghnamullen	Cootehill
Keenogduff	172	Cremorne	Aghnamullen	Cootehill
Keenoge	295	Farney	Inishkeen	Dundalk
Kibberidog	103	Monaghan	Tedavnet	Monaghan
Kilcorran	268	Monaghan	Clones	Monaghan
Kilcran	39	Trough	Donagh	Monaghan
Kilcreen	153	Monaghan	Clones	Monaghan
Kilcrow	124	Dartree	Ematris	Cootehill
Kilcrow	196	Cremorne	Clontibret	Monaghan
Kilcumber	55	Dartree	Killeevan	Clones
Kildoagh	94	Monaghan	Tehallan	Monaghan
Kilfahavon	199	Trough	Errigal Trough	Monaghan
Kilgormly	100	Dartree	Clones	Clones
Kilkit	292	Cremorne	Aghnamullen	Castleblayney
Killabrick	167	Farney	Donaghmoyne	Carrickmacross
Killakeady	87	Trough	Errigal Trough	Monaghan
Killanny	148	Trough	Errigal Trough	Clogher
Killark	172	Farney	Magheracloone	Carrickmacross
Killark	119	Dartree	Currin	Clones
Killarue	155	Farney	Donaghmoyne	Carrickmacross
Killatten	70	Monaghan	Tedavnet	Monaghan
Killeanly	112	Trough	Errigal Trough	Monaghan
Killeef	82	Monaghan	Tehallan	Monaghan
Killeevan Gleve	108	Dartree	Killeevan	Clones
Killina	194	Dartree	Clones	Monaghan
Killybern	138	Trough	Errigal Trough	Clogher
Killyboley	70	Farney	Inishkeen	Dundalk
Killyboley	666	Trough	Donagh	Monaghan
Killybough	89	Monaghan	Tedavnet	Monaghan
Killybreen	212	Trough	Errigal Trough	Monaghan
Killybressal	99	Trough	Errigal Trough	Monaghan
Killybrone	134	Trough	Errigal Trough	Clogher
Killycard	180	Cremorne	Muckno	Castleblayney
Killycarnan	86	Monaghan	Tehallan	Monaghan
Killycarnan North	99	Monaghan	Tedavnet	Monaghan
Killycarnan South	101	Monaghan	Tedavnet	Monaghan
Killycarran	241	Trough	Errigal Trough	Monaghan
Killycoghill	141	Dartree	Clones	Monaghan
Killyconigan	203	Trough	Donagh	Monaghan
Killyconigan	87	Monaghan	Monaghan	Monaghan
Killycooly	271	Trough	Donagh	Monaghan
Killycoouagh	231	Dartree	Killeevan	Clones
Killycorran	40	Trough	Errigal Trough	Monaghan
Killycracken	330	Cremorne	Muckno	Castleblayney
Killycreen	83	Monaghan	Tedavnet	Monaghan
Killycrom	156	Cremorne	Clontibret	Castleblayney
Killycronaghan	108	Dartree	Killeevan	Clones
Killycushil	72	Monaghan	Monaghan	Monaghan
Killydonagh	78	Trough	Errigal Trough	Monaghan
Killydonnelly	148	Monaghan	Tedavnet	Monaghan
Killydreen	117	Trough	Errigal Trough	Clogher
Killydrutan	78	Monaghan	Monaghan	Monaghan
Killyfaragh	130	Trough	Errigal Trough	Monaghan
Killyfargy	136	Dartree	Currin	Clones
Killyfuddy	207	Dartree	Killeevan	Clones
Killygally	183	Farney	Magheracloone	Carrickmacross
Killygavna	285	Monaghan	Tedavnet	Monaghan
Killygola	271	Cremorne	Muckno	Castleblayney
Killygone	100	Dartree	Killeevan	Clones
Killygorman	75	Dartree	Killeevan	Clones
Killygowan	98	Monaghan	Monaghan	Monaghan
Killygragy	137	Dartree	Aghabog	Cootehill
Killygrallan	189	Monaghan	Tedavnet	Monaghan
Killyhoman	151	Trough	Errigal Trough	Clogher
Killykerragh	111	Dartree	Clones	Monaghan
Killykeskeame	127	Dartree	Killeevan	Monaghan
Killylaragh	107	Trough	Errigal Trough	Monaghan
Killyleck (Lucas)	80	Trough	Errigal Trough	Monaghan
Killyleck (or Anketell)	86	Trough	Errigal Trough	Monaghan
Killyleen	139	Monaghan	Kilmore	Monaghan
Killyleg	166	Dartree	Aghabog	Cootehill
Killyliss	109	Cremorne	Aghnamullen	Cootehill
Killylough	296	Monaghan	Tedavnet	Monaghan
Killyloughavoy	97	Trough	Errigal Trough	Clogher
Killymarly	180	Monaghan	Monaghan	Monaghan
Killymarran	75	Monaghan	Tedavnet	Monaghan
Killymonaghan	143	Cremorne	Clontibret	Monaghan
Killymurry	133	Trough	Errigal Trough	Monaghan
Killyneill	231	Monaghan	Tehallan	Monaghan
Killynenagh	348	Dartree	Currin	Cootehill
Killyrean Lower	103	Trough	Donagh	Monaghan
Killyrean Upper	173	Trough	Donagh	Monaghan
Killyreask	68	Trough	Errigal Trough	Clogher
Killyslavan	95	Trough	Errigal Trough	Clogher
Killytur	98	Monaghan	Tedavnet	Monaghan
Killyvane	96	Monaghan	Monaghan	Monaghan
Kilmactrasna	139	Farney	Magheross	Carrickmacross
Kilmore East	260	Dartree	Ematris	Cootehill
Kilmore East	171	Monaghan	Tedavnet	Monaghan
Kilmore West	252	Dartree	Ematris	Cootehill
Kilmore West	294	Monaghan	Tedavnet	Monaghan
Kilmurry	365	Farney	Donaghmoyne	Carrickmacross
Kilnaclay	258	Monaghan	Drumsnat	Monaghan
Kilnacloy	136	Monaghan	Monaghan	Monaghan
Kilnacran	213	Monaghan	Tullycorbet	Monaghan
Kilnacranfy	95	Farney	Donaghmoyne	Carrickmacross
Kilnadreen	167	Trough	Donagh	Monaghan
Kilnageer	73	Trough	Errigal Trough	Monaghan
Kilnagullan	83	Trough	Errigal Trough	Monaghan
Kilnahaltar	143	Monaghan	Kilmore	Monaghan
Kilnaharvey	122	Dartree	Ematris	Cootehill
Kilnamaddy	114	Dartree	Killeevan	Clones
Kilnamaddy	108	Monaghan	Monaghan	Monaghan
Kilnamaddy	218	Monaghan	Tullycorbet	Monaghan
Kiltubbrid	68	Trough	Errigal Trough	Monaghan
Kiltubbrid	246	Monaghan	Kilmore	Monaghan
Kiltybegs	301	Farney	Donaghmoyne	Carrickmacross
Kiltybegs	124	Trough	Donagh	Monaghan
Kilvey	206	Trough	Donagh	Monaghan
Kinallybane	162	Farney	Killanny	Carrickmacross
Kinallyduff	138	Farney	Killanny	Carrickmacross
Kinard	69	Cremorne	Tehallan	Monaghan
Kincorragh	83	Monaghan	Clones	Monaghan
Kinduff	213	Dartree	Ematris	Cootehill
Kingorry	92	Monaghan	Tehallan	Monaghan
Kinnagin	222	Cremorne	Clontibret	Castleblayney
Kinturk	118	Dartree	Killeevan	Clones
Knappagh	214	Cremorne	Ballybay	Castleblayney
Knockabeany	157	Trough	Errigal Trough	Clogher
Knockaconny	100	Monaghan	Monaghan	Monaghan
Knockacullion	61	Monaghan	Tedavnet	Monaghan
Knockacunnier	70	Monaghan	Tehallan	Monaghan
Knockakirwan	98	Trough	Errigal Trough	Monaghan
Knockanearla	462	Monaghan	Tedavnet	Monaghan
Knockaphubble	88	Trough	Donagh	Monaghan
Knockatallan	405	Monaghan	Tedavnet	Monaghan
Knockaturly	362	Monaghan	Monaghan	Monaghan
Knockavolis	392	Cremorne	Clontibret	Castleblayney
Knockballyroney	796	Monaghan	Tedavnet	Monaghan
Knockboy	34	Monaghan	Tehallan	Monaghan
Knockconan	18	Trough	Errigal Trough	Monaghan
Knockcor	221	Dartree	Aghabog	Cootehill
Knockcor	130	Monaghan	Tedavnet	Monaghan
Knockinure	23	Monaghan	Clones	Monaghan
Knocknacarney	27	Trough	Errigal Trough	Monaghan
Knocknacran East	154	Farney	Magheracloone	Carrickmacross
Knocknacran West	179	Farney	Magheracloone	Carrickmacross
Knocknagarnaman	196	Farney	Inishkeen	Dundalk
Knocknageeha	354	Monaghan	Tedavnet	Monaghan
Knocknagrat	78	Monaghan	Clones	Monaghan
Knocknagrave	225	Trough	Donagh	Monaghan
Knocknalun	275	Monaghan	Tedavnet	Monaghan
Knocknamaddy	320	Cremorne	Ballybay	Castleblayney
Knocknamullagh (or Derryilan)	212	Farney	Donaghmoyne	Carrickmacross
Knocknaneen	400	Cremorne	Muckno	Castleblayney
Knocknasave	110	Trough	Donagh	Monaghan
Knockreagh	54	Farney	Inishkeen	Dundalk
Knockreagh Lower	142	Farney	Donaghmoyne	Castleblayney
Knockreagh Upper	183	Farney	Donaghmoyne	Carrickmacross
Knockronaghan	195	Trough	Donagh	Monaghan
Knocks East	78	Dartree	Currin	Cootehill
Knocks West	162	Dartree	Currin	Clones
Lackafin	207	Farney	Donaghmoyne	Castleblayney
Lackagh	222	Cremorne	Clontibret	Castleblayney
Lackan	340	Cremorne	Aghnamullen	Castleblayney
Lacklom	187	Farney	Inishkeen	Dundalk
Lagan	210	Cremorne	Aghnamullen	Castleblayney
Lannat	184	Farney	Inishkeen	Dundalk
Lantaur	193	Monaghan	Tullycorbet	Monaghan
Lappan	102	Cremorne	Tehallan	Monaghan
Laragh	159	Farney	Donaghmoyne	Carrickmacross
Laragh	365	Cremorne	Aghnamullen	Castleblayney
Laragh	387	Cremorne	Ballybay	Castleblayney
Largy	125	Dartree	Clones	Clones
Latgallan	48	Dartree	Clones	Clones
Latgee	9	Trough	Errigal Trough	Monaghan
Latinalbany	184	Farney	Magheross	Carrickmacross
Latlorcan	151	Monaghan	Monaghan	Monaghan
Latnakelly	140	Cremorne	Clontibret	Castleblayney
Latnamard	322	Dartree	Aghabog	Monaghan
Latroe	110	Dartree	Killeevan	Clones
Lattacrom	396	Cremorne	Aghnamullen	Castleblayney
Lattacrossan	169	Dartree	Currin	Clones
Lattigar	28	Monaghan	Monaghan	Monaghan
Latton	333	Cremorne	Aghnamullen	Cootehill
Lattonfasky	337	Cremorne	Aghnamullen	Castleblayney
Lattylanigan	122	Farney	Donaghmoyne	Carrickmacross
Lavagilduff	252	Farney	Magheracloone	Carrickmacross
Leagh	100	Cremorne	Aghnamullen	Cootehill
Leagh	168	Monaghan	Monaghan	Monaghan
Leck	195	Monaghan	Kilmore	Monaghan
Lecklevera	284	Dartree	Killeevan	Monaghan
Leeg	303	Farney	Killanny	Carrickmacross
Leek	204	Trough	Donagh	Monaghan
Legacurry	183	Trough	Donagh	Monaghan
Legacurry	164	Monaghan	Tullycorbet	Monaghan
Legarhill	158	Dartree	Clones	Clones
Legghimore	178	Farney	Magheross	Carrickmacross
Legnacreeve	286	Monaghan	Monaghan	Monaghan
Legnakelly	238	Dartree	Clones	Clones
Leitrim	153	Farney	Magheracloone	Carrickmacross
Leitrim	287	Monaghan	Tehallan	Monaghan
Lemgare	427	Cremorne	Clontibret	Castleblayney
Lenagh	106	Trough	Errigal Trough	Monaghan
Lennaght	257	Monaghan	Tedavnet	Monaghan
Lennan	156	Monaghan	Tullycorbet	Monaghan
Leonards Island	100	Dartree	Clones	Clones
Leons (M'Kenna) (or Leons Garve)	270	Farney	Magheracloone	Carrickmacross
Leons Beg	80	Farney	Magheracloone	Carrickmacross
Leons Garve (or Leons (M'Kenna))	270	Farney	Magheracloone	Carrickmacross
Letgonnelly	61	Trough	Donagh	Monaghan
Letloonigan	12	Trough	Donagh	Monaghan
Letteragh	120	Cremorne	Clontibret	Monaghan
Letterbane	276	Cremorne	Clontibret	Monaghan
Lisabuck	129	Dartree	Killeevan	Clones
Lisacullion	259	Farney	Magheross	Carrickmacross
Lisaginny	103	Cremorne	Clontibret	Monaghan
Lisagore	100	Farney	Donaghmoyne	Castleblayney
Lisalea	111	Dartree	Killeevan	Clones
Lisanisk	206	Farney	Magheross	Carrickmacross
Lisanly	193	Cremorne	Clontibret	Castleblayney
Lisaquill	70	Farney	Donaghmoyne	Castleblayney
Lisarearke	149	Dartree	Currin	Clones
Lisarilly	118	Dartree	Killeevan	Monaghan
Lisatilister	163	Farney	Magheracloone	Carrickmacross
Lisavargy	70	Trough	Errigal Trough	Monaghan
Lisbane	36	Monaghan	Kilmore	Monaghan
Lisboy	82	Trough	Donagh	Monaghan
Lisbrannan	159	Dartree	Ematris	Cootehill
Liscarnan	128	Farney	Magheracloone	Carrickmacross
Liscarney	60	Monaghan	Tehallan	Monaghan
Liscat	58	Monaghan	Drumsnat	Monaghan
Lisconduff	113	Cremorne	Tehallan	Monaghan
Liscorran	28	Farney	Magheracloone	Carrickmacross
Liscumasky	321	Dartree	Aghabog	Monaghan
Lisdarragh	146	Dartree	Killeevan	Clones
Lisdonny	282	Cremorne	Muckno	Castleblayney
Lisdoonan	169	Farney	Donaghmoyne	Carrickmacross
Lisdrumcleve	331	Cremorne	Aghnamullen	Castleblayney
Lisdrumdoagh	103	Monaghan	Monaghan	Monaghan
Lisdrumgormly	255	Cremorne	Clontibret	Castleblayney
Lisdrumturk	337	Farney	Magheross	Carrickmacross
Lisduff	270	Cremorne	Aghnamullen	Castleblayney
Liseenan	362	Cremorne	Muckno	Castleblayney
Liseggerton	151	Dartree	Clones	Clones
Lisgall	155	Farney	Donaghmoyne	Carrickmacross
Lisgall	67	Dartree	Clones	Clones
Lisgillan	295	Cremorne	Aghnamullen	Cootehill
Lisglassan	138	Cremorne	Clontibret	Monaghan
Lisgoagh	102	Trough	Donagh	Monaghan
Lisgorran	196	Cremorne	Aghnamullen	Cootehill
Lisgrew	51	Trough	Errigal Trough	Monaghan
Lisinan	97	Monaghan	Clones	Monaghan
Lisinisky	302	Cremorne	Aghnamullen	Carrickmacross
Lisirril	282	Farney	Magheross	Carrickmacross
Liskeabrick	56	Monaghan	Clones	Monaghan
Liskenna	76	Trough	Errigal Trough	Monaghan
Lislannan	66	Dartree	Clones	Clones
Lislea	75	Dartree	Currin	Clones
Lislea	105	Dartree	Aghabog	Cootehill
Lisleitrim	145	Monaghan	Monaghan	Monaghan
Lislongfield	169	Dartree	Aghabog	Cootehill
Lislynchahan	145	Dartree	Ematris	Cootehill
Lismacrerk	137	Monaghan	Monaghan	Monaghan
Lismagonway	136	Dartree	Aghabog	Cootehill
Lismagunshin	151	Cremorne	Clontibret	Monaghan
Lismeagh	55	Dartree	Clones	Clones
Lismenan	24	Monaghan	Monaghan	Monaghan
Lisnaclea	171	Farney	Magheracloone	Carrickmacross
Lisnadarragh	274	Cremorne	Aghnamullen	Carrickmacross
Lisnafeddaly	201	Farney	Magheross	Carrickmacross
Lisnafinelly	72	Farney	Donaghmoyne	Carrickmacross
Lisnagalliagh	239	Cremorne	Aghnamullen	Cootehill
Lisnagore	275	Dartree	Killeevan	Clones
Lisnagreeve	197	Cremorne	Clontibret	Castleblayney
Lisnaguiveragh	179	Farney	Magheross	Carrickmacross
Lisnagunnion	134	Farney	Donaghmoyne	Carrickmacross
Lisnakeeny	189	Farney	Magheracloone	Carrickmacross
Lisnakelly	158	Farney	Killanny	Carrickmacross
Lisnalee	225	Dartree	Currin	Clones
Lisnalee	145	Monaghan	Kilmore	Monaghan
Lisnalong	150	Cremorne	Aghnamullen	Cootehill
Lisnamacka	99	Farney	Donaghmoyne	Carrickmacross
Lisnamoyle Etra	150	Farney	Donaghmoyne	Carrickmacross
Lisnamoyle Otra	149	Farney	Donaghmoyne	Carrickmacross
Lisnanore	46	Monaghan	Tehallan	Monaghan
Lisnaroe Far	83	Dartree	Clones	Clones
Lisnaroe Near	131	Dartree	Clones	Clones
Lisnashannagh	106	Farney	Killanny	Carrickmacross
Lisnashannagh	194	Monaghan	Kilmore	Monaghan
Lisnaveane	283	Dartree	Ematris	Cootehill
Lisnaveane	206	Cremorne	Tullycorbet	Monaghan
Lisoarty	112	Dartree	Clones	Clones
Lisquigny	133	Monaghan	Tullycorbet	Monaghan
Lisroosky	105	Trough	Errigal Trough	Monaghan
Lissaraw	193	Monaghan	Monaghan	Monaghan
Lisseagh	56	Trough	Errigal Trough	Monaghan
Listellan	146	Dartree	Killeevan	Clones
Listinny	105	Cremorne	Clontibret	Monaghan
Listraheagny	89	Monaghan	Monaghan	Monaghan
Listroar	134	Cremorne	Clontibret	Monaghan
Longfield	374	Cremorne	Muckno	Castleblayney
Longfield	164	Dartree	Clones	Clones
Longfield Etra	139	Farney	Donaghmoyne	Carrickmacross
Longfield Otra	146	Farney	Donaghmoyne	Carrickmacross
Looart	148	Trough	Donagh	Monaghan
Losset	181	Farney	Magheracloone	Carrickmacross
Losset	172	Dartree	Ematris	Cootehill
Losset	124	Monaghan	Kilmore	Monaghan
Lossets	99	Farney	Magheross	Carrickmacross
Loughbrattoge	343	Cremorne	Muckno	Castleblayney
Loughoony	66	Dartree	Clones	Clones
Lowertown	64	Dartree	Clones	Clones
Loyst	224	Monaghan	Kilmore	Monaghan
Luppan	125	Trough	Errigal Trough	Clogher
Lurgachamlough	218	Cremorne	Aghnamullen	Castleblayney
Lurganboy	188	Cremorne	Muckno	Castleblayney
Lurganboy	217	Dartree	Currin	Cootehill
Lurganboys	232	Farney	Donaghmoyne	Carrickmacross
Lurganearly	325	Cremorne	Muckno	Castleblayney
Lurgangreen	328	Cremorne	Aghnamullen	Castleblayney
Lurganmore	181	Cremorne	Muckno	Castleblayney
Lurgans	273	Farney	Magheross	Carrickmacross
Magheraboy	170	Farney	Magheross	Carrickmacross
Magheranure	113	Dartree	Clones	Clones
Magherarny	248	Dartree	Clones	Clones
Magherashaghry	177	Dartree	Currin	Cootehill
Maghernacloy	152	Farney	Magheracloone	Carrickmacross
Maghernaharny	404	Dartree	Ematris	Cootehill
Maghernakelly	125	Dartree	Ematris	Cootehill
Maghernakill	148	Farney	Donaghmoyne	Castleblayney
Magheross	136	Farney	Magheross	Carrickmacross
Maghery	114	Monaghan	Clones	Inishowen
Maghon	497	Cremorne	Aghnamullen	Cootehill
Magoney	200	Farney	Inishkeen	Dundalk
Mason Lodge	43	Farney	Magheracloone	Carrickmacross
Milligan	96	Monaghan	Tedavnet	Monaghan
Milltown	191	Dartree	Ematris	Cootehill
Miskish Beg	95	Farney	Inishkeen	Dundalk
Miskish More	75	Farney	Inishkeen	Dundalk
Modesse	218	Cremorne	Clontibret	Castleblayney
Mokeeran	158	Farney	Magheracloone	Carrickmacross
Momony	89	Farney	Donaghmoyne	Carrickmacross
Monage	82	Dartree	Ematris	Cootehill
**Monaghan**	Town	Monaghan	Monaghan	Monaghan
Monagor	186	Cremorne	Clontibret	Castleblayney
Monalia	164	Farney	Donaghmoyne	Carrickmacross
Monaltybane	130	Farney	Killanny	Carrickmacross
Monaltyduff	130	Farney	Killanny	Carrickmacross
Monanagirr	174	Farney	Donaghmoyne	Carrickmacross
Monanny	159	Farney	Donaghmoyne	Carrickmacross
Monantin	142	Cremorne	Ballybay	Castleblayney
Money	235	Cremorne	Aghnamullen	Cootehill
Moneyvolan	181	Cremorne	Clontibret	Castleblayney
Monintin	240	Cremorne	Aghnamullen	Cootehill
Monmurry	246	Trough	Donagh	Monaghan
Monneill	117	Dartree	Ematris	Cootehill
Monyglen	221	Farney	Donaghmoyne	Carrickmacross
Monygorbet	48	Farney	Donaghmoyne	Castleblayney
Moraghy	121	Cremorne	Muckno	Castleblayney
Mount Anketell	60	Trough	Errigal Trough	Monaghan
Mount Carmel	183	Cremorne	Aghnamullen	Cootehill
Mountain Lodge Demesne	484	Cremorne	Aghnamullen	Cootehill
Moy	225	Cremorne	Muckno	Castleblayney
Moy	165	Trough	Errigal Trough	Clogher
Moy Etra	160	Cremorne	Clontibret	Monaghan
Moy Otra	112	Cremorne	Clontibret	Monaghan
Moyle Beg	145	Cremorne	Aghnamullen	Cootehill
Moyle More	157	Cremorne	Aghnamullen	Cootehill
Moylemuck	147	Cremorne	Aghnamullen	Cootehill
Moyles	121	Farney	Donaghmoyne	Carrickmacross
Moyles	241	Monaghan	Monaghan	Monaghan
Moylough	103	Farney	Magheracloone	Carrickmacross
Moysnaght	121	Cremorne	Clontibret	Monaghan
Mucker	101	Farney	Donaghmoyne	Carrickmacross
Mucklagh	57	Dartree	Currin	Cootehill
Muff	75	Farney	Donaghmoyne	Carrickmacross
Muladuff	101	Monaghan	Clones	Monaghan
Muldrumman	194	Cremorne	Clontibret	Castleblayney
Mullabrack	95	Monaghan	Clones	Monaghan
Mullabrack (Scott)	88	Trough	Donagh	Monaghan
Mullabrack (Shaw)	100	Trough	Donagh	Monaghan
Mullabryan	220	Trough	Errigal Trough	Monaghan
Mulladermot	119	Trough	Errigal Trough	Monaghan
Mullagarry	162	Cremorne	Clontibret	Monaghan
Mullagh Otra	130	Trough	Errigal Trough	Clogher
Mullaghadun	115	Monaghan	Monaghan	Monaghan
Mullaghanee	222	Cremorne	Clontibret	Castleblayney
Mullaghbane	168	Trough	Donagh	Monaghan
Mullaghboy	108	Dartree	Killeevan	Clones
Mullaghboy	121	Trough	Donagh	Monaghan
Mullaghcor	121	Trough	Errigal Trough	Monaghan
Mullaghcroghery	321	Farney	Magheross	Carrickmacross
Mullaghcroghery	53	Monaghan	Monaghan	Monaghan
Mullaghduff	159	Cremorne	Clontibret	Castleblayney
Mullaghduff	117	Trough	Donagh	Monaghan
Mullaghgarve	119	Farney	Magheracloone	Carrickmacross
Mullaghgreenan	176	Dartree	Aghabog	Cootehill
Mullaghinshigo	206	Monaghan	Tedavnet	Monaghan
Mullaghmacateer	155	Farney	Killanny	Carrickmacross
Mullaghmatt	68	Monaghan	Monaghan	Monaghan
Mullaghmeen	119	Farney	Killanny	Carrickmacross
Mullaghmonaghan	92	Monaghan	Monaghan	Monaghan
Mullaghmore	85	Trough	Errigal Trough	Clogher
Mullaghmore	176	Dartree	Aghabog	Cootehill
Mullaghmore	122	Monaghan	Tehallan	Monaghan
Mullaghmore East	115	Monaghan	Tedavnet	Monaghan
Mullaghmore North	285	Monaghan	Tedavnet	Monaghan
Mullaghmore West	146	Monaghan	Tedavnet	Monaghan
Mullaghnahegny	105	Trough	Errigal Trough	Monaghan
Mullaghpeak	129	Trough	Donagh	Monaghan
Mullaghrafferty	121	Farney	Magheracloone	Carrickmacross
Mullaghselsana	46	Trough	Errigal Trough	Clogher
Mullaghunshinagh	365	Farney	Donaghmoyne	Carrickmacross
Mullaglassan	108	Monaghan	Clones	Monaghan
Mullaliss	123	Trough	Donagh	Monaghan
Mullaloughan	182	Trough	Donagh	Monaghan
Mullamurphy	110	Trough	Donagh	Monaghan
Mullan	71	Trough	Errigal Trough	Monaghan
Mullan	242	Monaghan	Tullycorbet	Monaghan
Mullanabattog	129	Monaghan	Monaghan	Monaghan
Mullanacask	140	Trough	Errigal Trough	Clogher
Mullanacloy	145	Dartree	Clones	Clones
Mullanacross	137	Trough	Errigal Trough	Clogher
Mullanacross	136	Monaghan	Drumsnat	Monaghan
Mullanafinnog	58	Trough	Errigal Trough	Clogher
Mullanagore	225	Cremorne	Aghnamullen	Cootehill
Mullanamoy	80	Dartree	Clones	Clones
Mullananallog	101	Trough	Errigal Trough	Monaghan
Mullananalt	216	Cremorne	Aghnamullen	Castleblayney
Mullanarockan	113	Monaghan	Tedavnet	Monaghan
Mullanarry	125	Farney	Magheross	Carrickmacross
Mullanary Glebe	182	Cremorne	Aghnamullen	Cootehill
Mullanarycortannel	270	Cremorne	Aghnamullen	Castleblayney
Mullanavannog	78	Farney	Donaghmoyne	Carrickmacross
Mullanavannog	113	Monaghan	Drumsnat	Monaghan
Mullandavagh	139	Monaghan	Clones	Monaghan
Mullanderg	141	Trough	Errigal Trough	Monaghan
Mullanlary	95	Trough	Donagh	Monaghan
Mullans	66	Cremorne	Clontibret	Monaghan
Mullantimore	122	Monaghan	Tedavnet	Monaghan
Mullantlavan	159	Farney	Magheracloone	Carrickmacross
Mullantornan	157	Farney	Magheracloone	Carrickmacross
Mullatigorry	160	Monaghan	Tedavnet	Monaghan
Mullatishaughlin	178	Monaghan	Tedavnet	Monaghan
Mullyash	337	Cremorne	Muckno	Castleblayney
Mullycrock	165	Monaghan	Tullycorbet	Monaghan
Mullyera	65	Monaghan	Tedavnet	Monaghan
Mullyera	57	Monaghan	Tedavnet	Monaghan
Mullyjordan	193	Trough	Donagh	Monaghan
Mullyknock	162	Monaghan	Monaghan	Monaghan
Mullylusty	171	Farney	Magheracloone	Carrickmacross
Mullymagaraghan	95	Dartree	Aghabog	Cootehill
Mullynahinch	139	Monaghan	Kilmore	Monaghan
Mullynure	81	Trough	Errigal Trough	Clogher
Mullyore	141	Farney	Magheracloone	Carrickmacross
Munnilly	149	Dartree	Clones	Clones
Nafarty	263	Farney	Magheross	Carrickmacross
Naghill	155	Monaghan	Drumsnat	Monaghan
Nart	105	Monaghan	Clones	Monaghan
Nart	177	Monaghan	Kilmore	Monaghan
**Newbliss**	Town	Dartree	Killeevan	Clones
Newbliss	347	Dartree	Killeevan	Clones
Newgrove	144	Monaghan	Tedavnet	Monaghan
Nook	85	Dartree	Clones	Clones
Nure Beg	47	Farney	Killanny	Carrickmacross
Nure Beg	85	Farney	Magheracloone	Carrickmacross
Nure More	128	Farney	Killanny	Carrickmacross
Nure More	118	Farney	Magheracloone	Carrickmacross
Oghill	91	Farney	Donaghmoyne	Carrickmacross
Oghill	289	Cremorne	Clontibret	Castleblayney
Onomy	125	Cremorne	Muckno	Castleblayney
**Oram**	Town	Cremorne	Muckno	Castleblayney
Ouvry	190	Farney	Magheross	Carrickmacross
Peast	211	Farney	Magheross	Carrickmacross
Point	115	Monaghan	Kilmore	Monaghan
Portinaghy	123	Trough	Donagh	Monaghan
Pullans	192	Cremorne	Clontibret	Monaghan
Pullis	222	Trough	Donagh	Monaghan
Quiglough	103	Monaghan	Tedavnet	Monaghan
Rabows	70	Dartree	Killeevan	Clones
Racaulfield	99	Dartree	Killeevan	Clones
Rackwallace	308	Monaghan	Monaghan	Monaghan
Raconnellk	225	Monaghan	Tedavnet	Monaghan
Racreeghan (or Fastry)	284	Dartree	Ematris	Cootehill
Radeerpark	255	Dartree	Killeevan	Clones
Radeery	139	Dartree	Aghabog	Monaghan
Radrum	164	Monaghan	Kilmore	Monaghan
Radrumskean	112	Farney	Killanny	Carrickmacross
Rafeenan	272	Monaghan	Tedavnet	Monaghan
Raferagh	551	Farney	Magheross	Carrickmacross
Raflacony	72	Trough	Errigal Trough	Clogher
Rahans	249	Farney	Donaghmoyne	Carrickmacross
Rahans	164	Farney	Magheracloone	Carrickmacross
Rakean	138	Dartree	Aghabog	Cootehill
Rakeeragh	163	Farney	Magheross	Carrickmacross
Rakeeragh	107	Dartree	Ematris	Cootehill
Rakeeragh	137	Monaghan	Monaghan	Monaghan
Rakeevan	70	Dartree	Aghabog	Cootehill
Rakelly	51	Trough	Errigal Trough	Clogher
Ralaghan	163	Trough	Errigal Trough	Monaghan
Ramanny	114	Monaghan	Monaghan	Monaghan
Ramoy	46	Dartree	Clones	Clones
Rarutagh	117	Trough	Donagh	Monaghan
Rateerbane	136	Dartree	Killeevan	Clones
Rathmore	160	Farney	Donaghmoyne	Carrickmacross
Rausker	175	Cremorne	Clontibret	Castleblayney
Raw	151	Cremorne	Aghnamullen	Cootehill
Rebane	272	Cremorne	Aghnamullen	Castleblayney
Reduff	214	Cremorne	Aghnamullen	Castleblayney
**Rockcorry**	Town	Dartree	Ematris	Cootehill
Roo	171	Cremorne	Aghnamullen	Castleblayney
Roosky	226	Dartree	Killeevan	Clones
Roosky	119	Monaghan	Drumsnat	Monaghan
Roosky	154	Monaghan	Monaghan	Monaghan
Roranna	137	Dartree	Drummully	Clones
Rosefield	178	Monaghan	Kilmore	Monaghan
Rossarrell	133	Trough	Donagh	Monaghan
Rossdreenagh	279	Farney	Donaghmoyne	Carrickmacross
Rossnaglogh East	125	Dartree	Aghabog	Cootehill
Rossnaglogh West	110	Dartree	Aghabog	Cootehill
Rossolius	192	Cremorne	Clontibret	Castleblayney
Rough Hill	64	Monaghan	Clones	Monaghan
Sandhills	78	Dartree	Currin	Clones
Scalkill	365	Farney	Magheracloone	Carrickmacross
Scarnageeragh (or Emyvale)	119	Trough	Donagh	Monaghan
Scarvy	140	Dartree	Killeevan	Clones
**Scotstown**	Town	Monaghan	Tedavnet	Monaghan
Searkin	118	Dartree	Killeevan	Clones
Seaveagh	143	Monaghan	Tehallan	Monaghan
Seeola	129	Farney	Inishkeen	Dundalk
Selloo	65	Monaghan	Clones	Monaghan
Shanco	429	Farney	Magheross	Carrickmacross
Shanco	70	Dartree	Killeevan	Clones
Shanco	88	Trough	Errigal Trough	Monaghan
Shancobane	125	Farney	Donaghmoyne	Carrickmacross
Shancoduff	135	Farney	Donaghmoyne	Carrickmacross
Shane	180	Cremorne	Ballybay	Castleblayney
Shanemullagh	125	Cremorne	Clontibret	Monaghan
Shankill	259	Cremorne	Aghnamullen	Carrickmacross
Shankill	243	Dartree	Clones	Clones
Shanmullagh	127	Farney	Killanny	Carrickmacross
Shanmullagh	161	Trough	Errigal Trough	Clogher
Shanmullagh	143	Cremorne	Clontibret	Monaghan
Shanmullagh	213	Monaghan	Tullycorbet	Monaghan
Shanmullagh North	36	Monaghan	Clones	Monaghan
Shanmullagh South	159	Dartree	Clones	Clones
Shanrah	129	Farney	Killanny	Carrickmacross
Shanroe	83	Monaghan	Clones	Monaghan
Shantonagh	220	Cremorne	Aghnamullen	Castleblayney
Shantonagh	150	Cremorne	Ballybay	Castleblayney
Shantony	151	Cremorne	Aghnamullen	Castleblayney
Shee	196	Monaghan	Tedavnet	Monaghan
Sheetrim	224	Cremorne	Clontibret	Castleblayney
Sheetrim	142	Monaghan	Monaghan	Monaghan
Sheetrim	287	Monaghan	Tedavnet	Monaghan
Shelvins	163	Monaghan	Tehallan	Monaghan
Sheskin	418	Monaghan	Tedavnet	Monaghan
Sillis	310	Trough	Donagh	Monaghan
Skeachorn	121	Dartree	Killeevan	Clones
Skeagarvey	76	Monaghan	Monaghan	Monaghan
Skeagh	134	Monaghan	Drumsnat	Monaghan
Skeatry	76	Monaghan	Clones	Monaghan
Skerrick East	74	Dartree	Currin	Clones
Skerrick West	106	Dartree	Currin	Clones
Skerrymore	213	Cremorne	Muckno	Castleblayney
Skervan	116	Monaghan	Drumsnat	Monaghan
Skinnagin	94	Trough	Donagh	Monaghan
Skinnagin	85	Monaghan	Tehallan	Monaghan
Skinnahergna	112	Trough	Errigal Trough	Clogher
Slieveroe	264	Monaghan	Kilmore	Monaghan
**Smithborough**	Town	Monaghan	Clones	Monaghan
Sogher	82	Trough	Errigal Trough	Monaghan
Sra	225	Cremorne	Aghnamullen	Castleblayney
Srananny	157	Trough	Donagh	Monaghan
Sreenty	459	Farney	Magheross	Carrickmacross
Sruell (or Corragarry)	311	Farney	Donaghmoyne	Castleblayney
Sruveel	131	Monaghan	Tedavnet	Monaghan
Straclevan	106	Monaghan	Tedavnet	Monaghan
Stracrunnion	93	Monaghan	Tedavnet	Monaghan
Stradeen	117	Farney	Killanny	Carrickmacross
Straghan (or Cornasore)	124	Trough	Donagh	Monaghan
Stramackilroy	635	Monaghan	Tedavnet	Monaghan
Stramore	176	Trough	Donagh	Monaghan
Stranagarvagh	58	Dartree	Clones	Clones
Stranatona	150	Farney	Magheracloone	Carrickmacross
Stranoodan	202	Monaghan	Kilmore	Monaghan
Streanduff	31	Trough	Donagh	Monaghan
Tamlat	199	Cremorne	Aghnamullen	Cootehill
Tamlat	121	Trough	Errigal Trough	Monaghan
Tamlat	107	Monaghan	Monaghan	Monaghan
Tamlat	136	Monaghan	Tehallan	Monaghan
Tanderagee	149	Dartree	Clones	Clones
Tanderageebane	166	Monaghan	Monaghan	Monaghan
Tanderageebrack	136	Monaghan	Monaghan	Monaghan
Tanmacnally	170	Dartree	Ematris	Cootehill
Taplagh	139	Farney	Donaghmoyne	Carrickmacross
Tassan	500	Cremorne	Clontibret	Castleblayney
Tattincake	217	Dartree	Currin	Cootehill
Tattindonagh	208	Monaghan	Tedavnet	Monaghan
Tattintlieve	281	Cremorne	Muckno	Castleblayney
Tattintlieve	219	Dartree	Aghabog	Monaghan
Tattyboy	479	Farney	Donaghmoyne	Carrickmacross
Tattybrack	207	Cremorne	Aghnamullen	Cootehill
Tattygare	286	Cremorne	Clontibret	Castleblayney
Tattygare	104	Dartree	Ematris	Cootehill
Tattygare	107	Monaghan	Tedavnet	Monaghan
Tattynagall	167	Dartree	Killeevan	Monaghan
Tattyreagh North	305	Cremorne	Clontibret	Castleblayney
Tattyreagh South	123	Cremorne	Clontibret	Castleblayney
Tavanagh	104	Trough	Errigal Trough	Clogher
Tavanaskea	405	Cremorne	Muckno	Castleblayney
Tedavnet	46	Monaghan	Tedavnet	Monaghan
Teehill	128	Dartree	Clones	Clones
Teer	64	Dartree	Killeevan	Clones
Telaydan	193	Trough	Donagh	Monaghan
Telaydan	121	Monaghan	Tedavnet	Monaghan
Templetate	136	Dartree	Clones	Clones
Templetate	50	Monaghan	Tehallan	Monaghan
Teraverty	154	Monaghan	Tedavnet	Monaghan
Terrycaffe	166	Monaghan	Tehallan	Monaghan
Terrygeely	195	Monaghan	Tullycorbet	Monaghan
Terrygreeghan	248	Cremorne	Ballybay	Castleblayney
Terrytole	70	Monaghan	Tedavnet	Monaghan
Tetoppa	104	Monaghan	Kilmore	Monaghan
Thornhill	40	Monaghan	Drumsnat	Monaghan
Tievadinna and Cloghoge	302	Farney	Donaghmoyne	Carrickmacross
Tievaleny	234	Cremorne	Aghnamullen	Castleblayney
Tinary	145	Dartree	Aghabog	Clones
Tiragarvan	222	Farney	Magheross	Carrickmacross
Tiramoan	113	Trough	Donagh	Monaghan
Tirardan	123	Monaghan	Kilmore	Monaghan
Tiravera	181	Monaghan	Tehallan	Monaghan
Tiravray	155	Monaghan	Monaghan	Monaghan
Tircooney	88	Dartree	Clones	Clones
Tiredigan	104	Dartree	Killeevan	Monaghan
Tireran	150	Trough	Errigal Trough	Clogher
Tirfinnog	93	Monaghan	Monaghan	Monaghan
Tirkeenan	125	Monaghan	Monaghan	Monaghan
Tirmacmoe	110	Cremorne	Clontibret	Monaghan
Tirmadown	164	Monaghan	Kilmore	Monaghan
Tirnadrola	92	Farney	Magheross	Carrickmacross
Tirnahinch Far	166	Dartree	Clones	Clones
Tirnahinch Near	166	Dartree	Clones	Clones
Tirnamona	61	Monaghan	Tedavnet	Monaghan
Tirnaneill	232	Trough	Donagh	Monaghan
Tirnaskea North	120	Monaghan	Tedavnet	Monaghan
Tirnaskea South	66	Monaghan	Tedavnet	Monaghan
Tiromedan	195	Monaghan	Tullycorbet	Monaghan
Togan	167	Monaghan	Drumsnat	Monaghan
Tomany	170	Dartree	Ematris	Cootehill
Tomiska	104	Farney	Magheracloone	Carrickmacross
Tomogrow	257	Cremorne	Muckno	Castleblayney
Tonagh	258	Cremorne	Clontibret	Castleblayney
Tonagh	251	Dartree	Aghabog	Cootehill
Tonagimsy	118	Dartree	Ematris	Cootehill
Tonaneeve	309	Farney	Magheracloone	Carrickmacross
Tonintlieve	175	Trough	Errigal Trough	Clogher
Toniscoffy	441	Monaghan	Monaghan	Monaghan
Tonnagh	59	Dartree	Ematris	Cootehill
Tonyclea	588	Monaghan	Tedavnet	Monaghan
Tonycoogan	107	Trough	Donagh	Monaghan
Tonyellida	125	Farney	Donaghmoyne	Carrickmacross
Tonyfinnigan	185	Trough	Donagh	Monaghan
Tonyfohanan	84	Trough	Errigal Trough	Monaghan
Tonygarvey	114	Trough	Donagh	Monaghan
Tonyglassan	220	Cremorne	Ballybay	Castleblayney
Tonyglassan	128	Cremorne	Clontibret	Castleblayney
Tonyhamigan	74	Trough	Donagh	Monaghan
Tonynumery	87	Trough	Errigal Trough	Monaghan
Tonyscallan	172	Cremorne	Clontibret	Castleblayney
Tonyshandeny	106	Trough	Donagh	Monaghan
Tonysillogagh	145	Trough	Donagh	Monaghan
Tonystackan	252	Monaghan	Tedavnet	Monaghan
Tonytallagh	135	Dartree	Currin	Cootehill
Tooa	284	Cremorne	Aghnamullen	Castleblayney
Toome	216	Cremorne	Clontibret	Castleblayney
Toome	257	Farney	Donaghmoyne	Castleblayney
Tossy	233	Cremorne	Aghnamullen	Castleblayney
Tray	130	Farney	Donaghmoyne	Carrickmacross
Trostan	114	Farney	Magheross	Carrickmacross
Tuckmilltate	26	Monaghan	Tehallan	Monaghan
Tullaghaloyst	110	Dartree	Currin	Cootehill
Tullaghan	112	Monaghan	Tedavnet	Monaghan
Tullanacrunat	132	Cremorne	Muckno	Castleblayney
Tullanacrunat North	86	Farney	Donaghmoyne	Castleblayney
Tullanacrunat South	82	Farney	Donaghmoyne	Castleblayney
Tulleerin	65	Dartree	Clones	Monaghan
Tullinearly	152	Cremorne	Muckno	Castleblayney
Tullintlisny	191	Cremorne	Muckno	Castleblayney
Tullintrat	250	Cremorne	Muckno	Castleblayney
Tully	197	Trough	Donagh	Monaghan
Tully	94	Monaghan	Monaghan	Monaghan
Tully	50	Monaghan	Tedavnet	Monaghan
Tullyallen	136	Farney	Magheracloone	Carrickmacross
Tullyard	191	Dartree	Killeevan	Cootehill
Tullyard	103	Trough	Donagh	Monaghan
Tullyard	285	Monaghan	Monaghan	Monaghan
Tullybryan	151	Monaghan	Kilmore	Monaghan
Tullybuck	115	Cremorne	Clontibret	Monaghan
Tullycallick	96	Trough	Donagh	Monaghan
Tullycanaghy	394	Cremorne	Muckno	Castleblayney
Tullycarragh	287	Cremorne	Clontibret	Castleblayney
Tullycollive	250	Cremorne	Muckno	Castleblayney
Tullycoora	241	Cremorne	Muckno	Castleblayney
Tullycroman	176	Monaghan	Tedavnet	Monaghan
Tullycumasky	152	Cremorne	Clontibret	Monaghan
Tullygillen	126	Monaghan	Kilmore	Monaghan
Tullyglass	286	Cremorne	Aghnamullen	Castleblayney
Tullygony	111	Monaghan	Tedavnet	Monaghan
Tullygony	21	Monaghan	Tehallan	Monaghan
Tullyharnet	264	Cremorne	Muckno	Castleblayney
Tullyhirm	180	Monaghan	Monaghan	Monaghan
Tullyhumphry	126	Dartree	Currin	Clones
Tullykenny	142	Monaghan	Drumsnat	Monaghan
Tullyleer	124	Monaghan	Monaghan	Monaghan
Tullylish	90	Monaghan	Tehallan	Monaghan
Tullylone	162	Monaghan	Tedavnet	Monaghan
Tullylougherny	57	Farney	Donaghmoyne	Carrickmacross
Tullylougherny	162	Farney	Magheracloone	Carrickmacross
Tullymackilmaritn	107	Farney	Donaghmore	Carrickmacross
Tullynacross	84	Farney	Donaghmoyne	Carrickmacross
Tullynageer	346	Cremorne	Muckno	Castleblayney
Tullynagrow	221	Cremorne	Muckno	Castleblayney
Tullynahattina	361	Cremorne	Muckno	Castleblayney
Tullynahinnera	396	Cremorne	Aghnamullen	Castleblayney
Tullynamalra	297	Cremorne	Aghnamullen	Castleblayney
Tullynamalra	213	Cremorne	Muckno	Castleblayney
Tullynample	247	Dartree	Currin	Cootehill
Tullynanegish	298	Cremorne	Aghnamullen	Castleblayney
Tullynanure	72	Monaghan	Tehallan	Monaghan
Tullynarney	167	Monaghan	Kilmore	Monaghan
Tullynaskeagh East	265	Farney	Killanny	Carrickmacross
Tullynaskeagh West	197	Farney	Killanny	Carrickmacross
Tullyrahan	264	Cremorne	Muckno	Castleblayney
Tullyrain	276	Cremorne	Aghnamullen	Castleblayney
Tullyreas	100	Dartree	Killeevan	Clones
Tullyree	140	Trough	Donagh	Monaghan
Tullyshelferty	169	Monaghan	Kilmore	Monaghan
Tullyskerry	143	Cremorne	Clontibret	Castleblayney
Tullyvanus	198	Cremorne	Muckno	Castleblayney
Tullyvaragh Lower	174	Farney	Donaghmoyne	Carrickmacross
Tullyvaragh Upper	158	Farney	Donaghmoyne	Carrickmacross
Tullyvin	140	Cremorne	Clontibret	Castleblayney
Tullyvogy	158	Monaghan	Tedavnet	Monaghan
Ture	40	Dartree	Killeevan	Clones
Tusker	222	Farney	Donaghmoyne	Carrickmacross
Ullinagh	256	Cremorne	Aghnamullen	Castleblayney
Ummerafree	367	Farney	Magheross	Carrickmacross
Unshinagh	168	Dartree	Ematris	Cootehill
Urbalkirk	271	Monaghan	Monaghan	Monaghan
Urcher	163	Monaghan	Kilmore	Monaghan
Urlish	46	Trough	Errigal Trough	Clogher
White Island	13	Cremorne	Muckno	Castleblayney
White Island	59	Trough	Donagh	Monaghan
