= Killykeskeame =

Townland in County Monaghan, Ireland

Killykeskeame (Irish: Cill Choiscéim) is a townland in the civil parish of Killeevan, in the barony of Dartree, County Monaghan. Its area is 126.49 acres. The name Killykeskeame is an anglicisation of the Gaelic "Cill Choiscéim" which means the 'church of the footstep', referencing a medieval chapel that once was located in the townland.

== Name ==
The English version of the name for the townland is a close approximation to its original Gaelic pronunciation. However, as with many Irish placenames, the name has drifted from both the original and official pronunciation among some of its inhabitants. An incorrect, though recognised, form of "Killykespin" is now used by some people.

== History ==
The earliest historical remains in the townland consist of a Neolithic or Bronze Age Enclosure. Human activity from the Iron Age is attested from the presence of a ring fort, which are common archaeological features in drumlin landscape County Monaghan. The medieval chapel which gives the townland its name is, by folk tradition, associated with the MacMahon Lords of Dartree. Tradition states that this chapel was destroyed by Oliver Cromwell's soldiers during the Irish Confederate Wars in the 1650s. The religious history of the townland continued through the Penal Era when a Mass Rock was found in the townland.

== Irish Language ==
Irish Gaelic was the ordinary language of the people in the area until the nineteenth century. The form of Irish used was Oriel or East Ulster Irish. It is not known when exactly Irish ceased to be used as the ordinary medium of communication but it is likely that Irish continued to be used until the mid-nineteenth century. Throughout the parishes of Killeevan and Aghabog, Irish words continue to be used in ordinary speech, especially for things relating to nature, agriculture and the landscape. The last traditional speaker of Irish in the parish of Killeevan was Mrs. Bridget Beggan, who died in the late 1930s.

== Landscape ==
The townland is located in the drumlin country of south Ulster. The undulating landscape is a creation of Ice Age glaciers which once covered the area. The townland is now mostly farmland, with some forestry, and a single lake. However, due to its position in the historic "Glens" district of northern Killeevan and Aghabog, it offers views of northern County Monaghan, Slieve Beagh and parts of counties Fermanagh, Cavan and Tyrone.
