= Clogher =

Village in County Tyrone, Northern Ireland

Coordinates: 54.416667°N 7.2°W

Clogher: Irish: Clochar
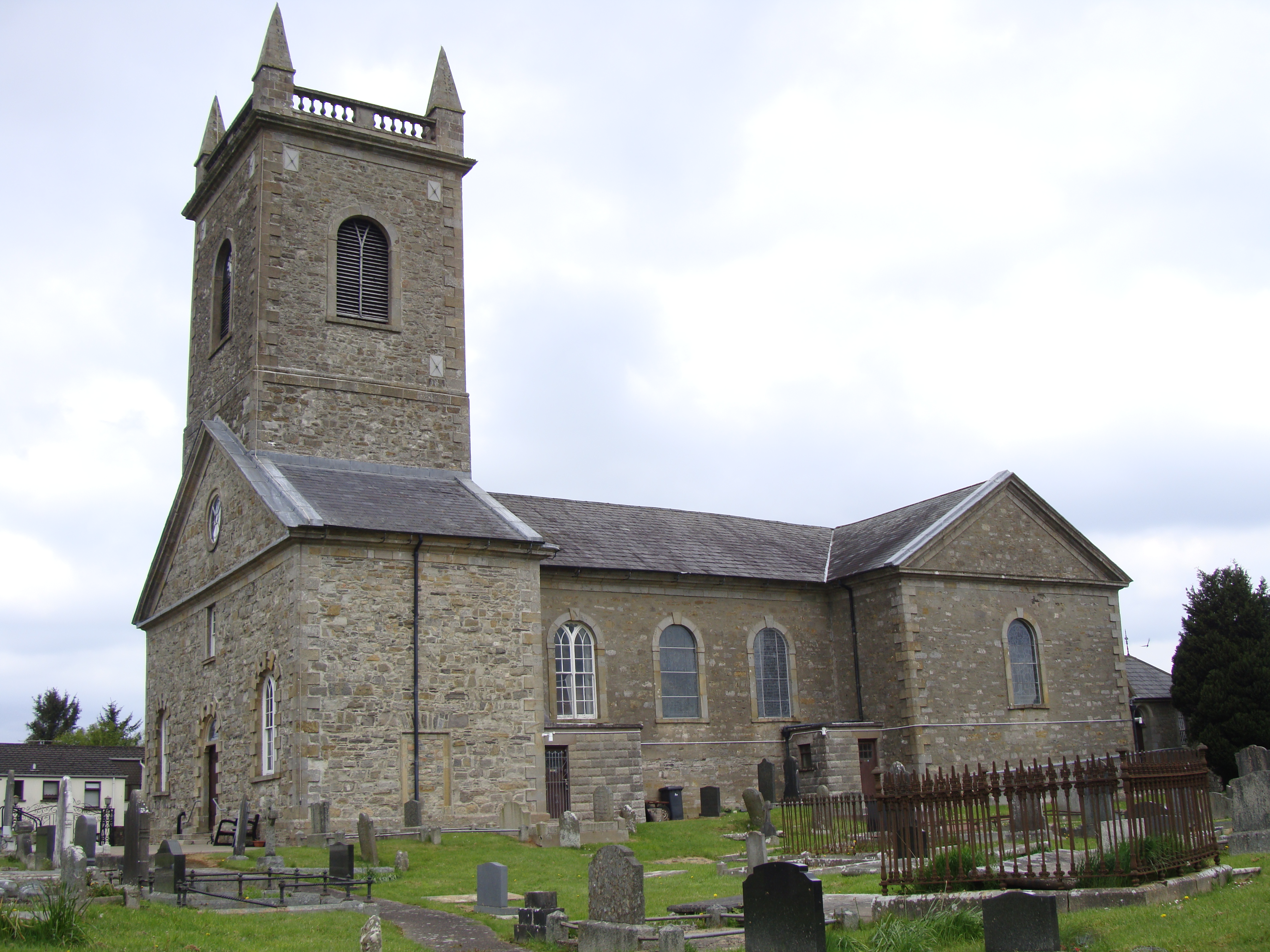
- Cathedral Church of Saint Macartan

- Location within Northern Ireland
- Population: 675 (2021 Census)
- Irish grid reference: H538517
  - Belfast: 59 miles
- District: Mid Ulster
- County: County Tyrone
- Country: Northern Ireland
- Sovereign state: United Kingdom
- Post town: CLOGHER
- Postcode district: BT76
- Dialling code: 028
- UK Parliament: Fermanagh and South Tyrone
- NI Assembly: Fermanagh and South Tyrone

Clogher (from Irish Clochar, meaning 'stony place'; /ˈklɔː.ər/, /ˈklɒ.hər/) is a village and civil parish in the border area of south County Tyrone, Northern Ireland. It lies on the River Blackwater, about 6 miles (10 km) from the border crossing to County Monaghan. It stands on the townlands of Clogher Demesne and Clogher Tenements. The 2021 census recorded a population of 675. The civil parish of Clogher covers areas of County Fermanagh as well as County Tyrone.

== History ==
Clogher is home to the provincial office in Northern Ireland for the congregation of the Sisters of Mercy (Roman Catholic order of nuns). From 1971 to 1991 The Mercy Order employed some of their nuns at St Macartan's Primary School following the leave of the order of saint louis as the school was actually founded by the Sisters of St Louis in the 1930s due to the high demand for primary Catholic education in the Clogher area. The Sisters of Mercy also had ownership of the St Macartan's nursing and dementia care home until recent years where they decided to hand the nursing home over to the NHS. The sisters of Saint Louis left Clogher in the 1970s and the Mercy Order continued their work. However, In the late 1980s the Sisters of Mercy were phased out of the school and retired from the job of teaching at St Macartan's School due to falling numbers of nuns and as a newer curriculum had been introduced in Northern Ireland it meant they needed more qualifications. They have since severed most ties with the St Macartan's Convent School but still live in the Convent of Mercy on the Ballagh Road, Clogher, next to the St Macartan's nursing home.

The name Clochar refers to something made of stone ('cloch' is the Irish word for 'stone' and can be anglicised as 'cloch', 'clogh' or 'clough'); probably on the site of the medieval monastery or a nearby ringfort. Archaeological remains from before the 5th century have been found in the vicinity. Clogher is said to have been the location of a gold-covered pagan oracle stone named Cermand Cestach. The story goes that "Cloch-Ór (Golden Stone), may have been a ceremonial or oracle stone (see Cenn Cruaich and Omphalos) originally covered in gold sacred to the druids...given to Mac Cairthinn by an old pagan noble (Cairpre, the father of St Tigernach of Clones), who had harassed him in every possible way until the saint's patient love won the local ruler to the faith." The stone is recorded as being "a curiosity in the porch of the Cathedral of Clogher" in the time of Annalist Cathal Maguire of Fermanagh in the late 15th century. Tighernach of Clones, later succeeded St. Mac Cairthinn as Bishop of Clogher.

Clogher has been a religious centre since St. Patrick's time and likely before. St. Aedh Mac Cairthinn of Clogher (c. 430–505 AD) an early disciple and companion of Saint Patrick founded a monastery at the site, which later the Synod of Rathbreasail recognised as an episcopal see. The Cathedral Church of Saint Macartan in the village is now one of two cathedrals of the Church of Ireland diocese of Clogher; the other is at Enniskillen. The Roman Catholic Diocese of Clogher has its cathedral in Monaghan. The meetinghouse of Clogher Presbyterian church is outside the village in the townland of Carntall. The "City of Clogher" was a rotten borough in the Parliament of Ireland in the gift of the Protestant bishop. The village also gives its name to the Barony of Clogher, one of the original four baronies of County Tyrone.

== Transport ==
Clogher railway station (on the narrow gauge Clogher Valley Railway) opened on 2 May 1887, but finally closed on 1 January 1942.

Clogher also has Ulsterbus services to Omagh and on the 261/X261 between Belfast and Enniskillen.

== Sport ==
Clogher Cricket Club plays in the NCU Senior League. The local Gaelic Athletic Association club is An Clochar Éire Óg.

== Education ==
The local primary schools include Carntall Primary School (which has a Protestant ethos) and St. Macartan's Convent Primary School (established by the Sisters of Saint Louis and has a Roman Catholic ethos). In 1932, the sisters of saint louis were invited to Clogher by request of the Bishop to open a catholic primary school and convent. In the following years, Saint Macartans convent school was established for the catholic children of Clogher and by 1935 the school was very successful. The sisters of saint louis continued to work in saint macartans up until 1972 when the sisters decided to leave Clogher and move to a bigger convent in County Monaghan.Not long after, the sisters of mercy continued the work of the Louis nuns up until 1991 when the sisters of mercy handed the ownership of saint macartans convent school over to the local catholic parish of Clogher. Since then, the sisters live in the convent of mercy on the Ballagh road, Clogher. ).

== Demography ==
=== 19th-century population ===
The population of the village decreased during the 19th century:

Year	1841	1851	1861	1871	1881	1891
Population	702	558	389	242	225	273
Houses	109	94	79	51	61	59

=== 2021 census ===
On Census Day in 2021, the usual resident population of Clogher settlement was 781 accounting for 0.02% of the NI total. Of these:

- 96.42% were from the white (including Irish Traveller) ethnic group;
- 58% belong to or were brought up in the Catholic religion and 33% belong to or were brought up in a Protestant and Other Christian (including Christian-related) religion; and
- 43% indicated that they had an Irish National Identity, 25% had a British identity, 21% identified as Northern Irish only and 5% accounted for 'other' identities. Respondents could indicate more than one national identity.

On Census Day 2021, in Clogher settlement, of the population aged 3 and over,

- 97% had English as their first language
- 32% had a high level or some ability in Irish
- 4% had some understanding in Ulster-Scots.

=== 2011 Census ===
On Census Day (27 March 2011) the usually resident population of Clogher Settlement was 717 accounting for 0.04% of the NI total. Of these:

- 97.63% were from the white (including Irish Traveller) ethnic group;
- 54.67% belong to or were brought up in the Catholic religion and 42.96% belong to or were brought up in a 'Protestant and Other Christian (including Christian related)' religion; and
- 42.12% indicated that they had a British national identity, 28.87% had an Irish national identity and 27.62% had a Northern Irish national identity. Respondents could indicate more than one national identity.

On Census Day 27 March 2011, in Clogher Settlement, of the population aged 3 years old and over:

- 15.81% had some knowledge of Irish;
- 3.66% had some knowledge of Ulster-Scots; and
- 7.61% did not have English as their first language.

== People ==
- The novelist William Carleton was born in the nearby townland of Prolusk (spelt Prillisk on his gravestone) in 1794.
- James Graham Fair, one of the 'Bonanza Kings' and U.S. Senator from Nevada was born in the town in 1831.
- Keith Farmer (1987–2022), motorcycle racer.
- Percy Jocelyn, Anglican bishop of Clogher, was deposed in 1822 for homosexual practices.
- Football player Dermot McCaffrey of Dungannon Swifts grew up in Clogher.
- Joseph B. O'Hagan (1826–1878), Jesuit priest
- Roisin Walsh, Dublin's first Chief Librarian, was born in Lisnamaghery, Clogher, in 1889.
- Juan Mackenna (1771–1814), Irish born Chilean military officer during the War of Independence from Spain.

== See also ==
- Abbeys and priories in Northern Ireland (County Tyrone)
- List of civil parishes of County Tyrone
- Attack on UDR Clogher barracks
