= Cumin of Mayo =

Irish saint

Cuimín
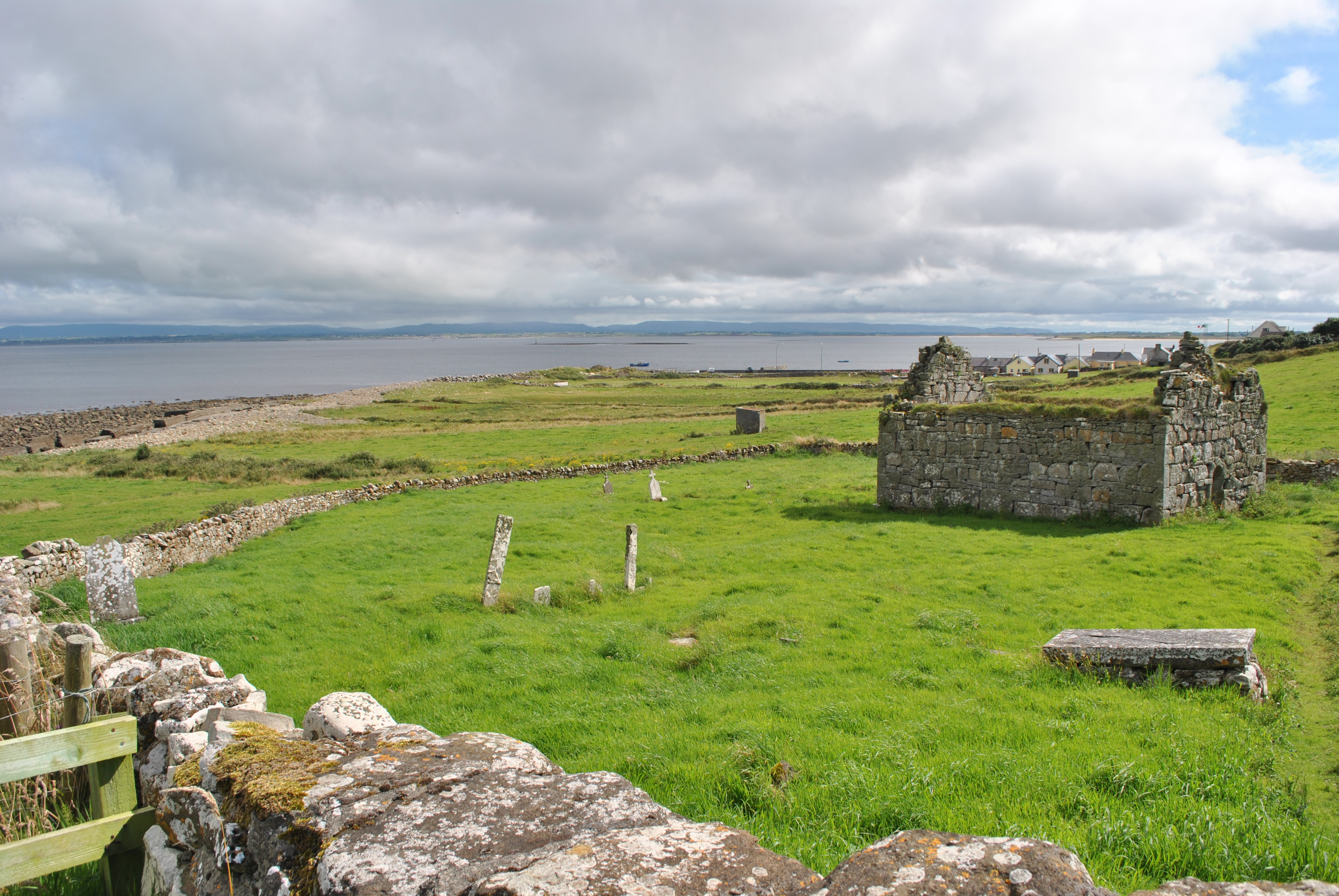
- Kilcummin's church
- Church: Kilcummin
- Province: Connacht

Personal details
- Buried: Kilcummin

Saint Cuimín (also Cummin, etc.) is an Irish saint associated with the parish of Kilcummin (Irish: Cill Chuimín "The church of Cuimín") in the barony of Tirawley, County Mayo. Kilcummin, a headland to the west of Killala Bay, preserves the remains of a religious site, with a church of early date and a graveyard. (54.27713°N 9.21015°W)

== History ==
Cuimín's background is touched upon in a genealogical text compiled by Dubhaltach Mac Fhir Bhisigh (died 1671), who was a member of a learned family from the area around Killala Bay. It names the saint "Cumain Foda" and identifies him as a descendant of Conaing son of Fergus son of Amailgaid, thereby linking him to the leading dynasty in the area, the Uí Amolngada. Máire MacNeill suggests that he is probably distinct from another Connacht saint of the same name, Cumméne Fota, who was abbot of Clonfert in the 7th century, although "the coincidence of name and epithet is curious". Pádraig Ó Riain also treats him as a different saint. Dubhaltach also distinguished him from Cuimín mac Dioma (of Uí Suanaig), whose descendants are said to rest at Kilcummin.

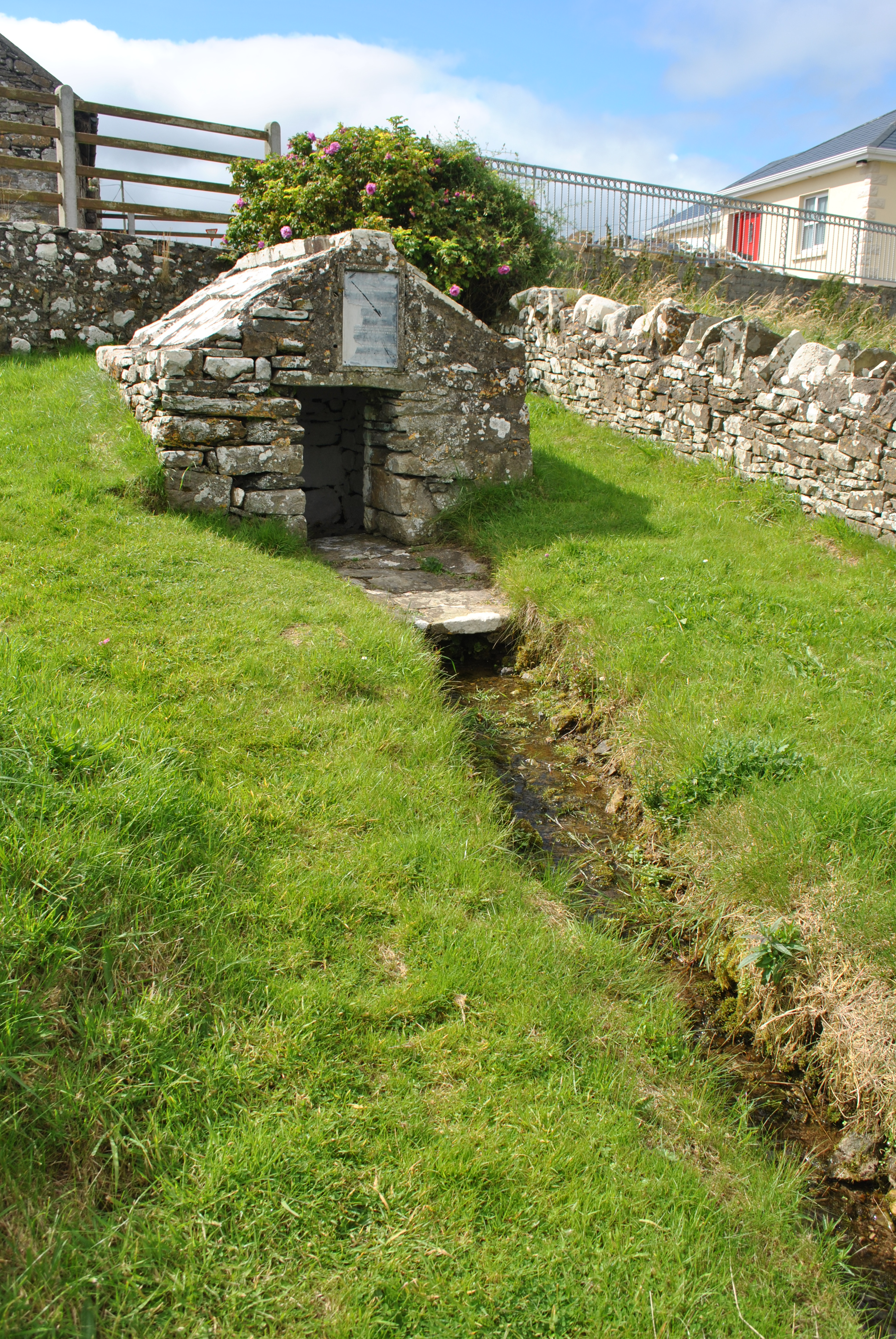
Cuimín of Kilcummin, Holy Well

While information about Cuimín's life and medieval cult is lacking, there is relatively plentiful evidence for his veneration in early modern and modern times. A holy well at Kilcummin was believed to have healing powers and served as a central place for the patron held in his honour on the last Sunday of July. The day was known as Domhnach Chrom Dubh (in Irish) or Garland Sunday (in English).

Curative powers were also ascribed to earth coming from the saint's grave. The prerogative of administering it to visitors belonged to the Machan (Maughan) or Loughney family, presumably because the family was known to descend from the erenachs (wardens) of the church. A flagstone at the saint's grave known as Leac Cuimín (The stone of Cuimín) is thought to have been used as a 'cursing stone' under similar guidance: members of the Machan (Maughan) or Loughney family could be asked to perform a ceremony to call down maledictions on people who had caused harm to others. The practice came to an end in the first half of the 19th century, when a dean by the name of Lyon had it removed "for certain weighty reasons" and built into the wall of the cathedral at Ballina, County Mayo. Others say that the stone was built into the wall of St Patrick's Cathedral, Killala.

Modern folklore tells that Crom Dubh was the cow which revealed the presence of the saintly child by licking a boat on the shore. The child was found inside and he was brought up by a couple named Maughan and Loughney, the owners of the cow.

There was a statue with the title "St Cumminskil" in St Brigid Roman Catholic Church in Liverpool, England. The church, located on Bevington Hill, has records dating from 1870 to 1967.

== Gallery ==
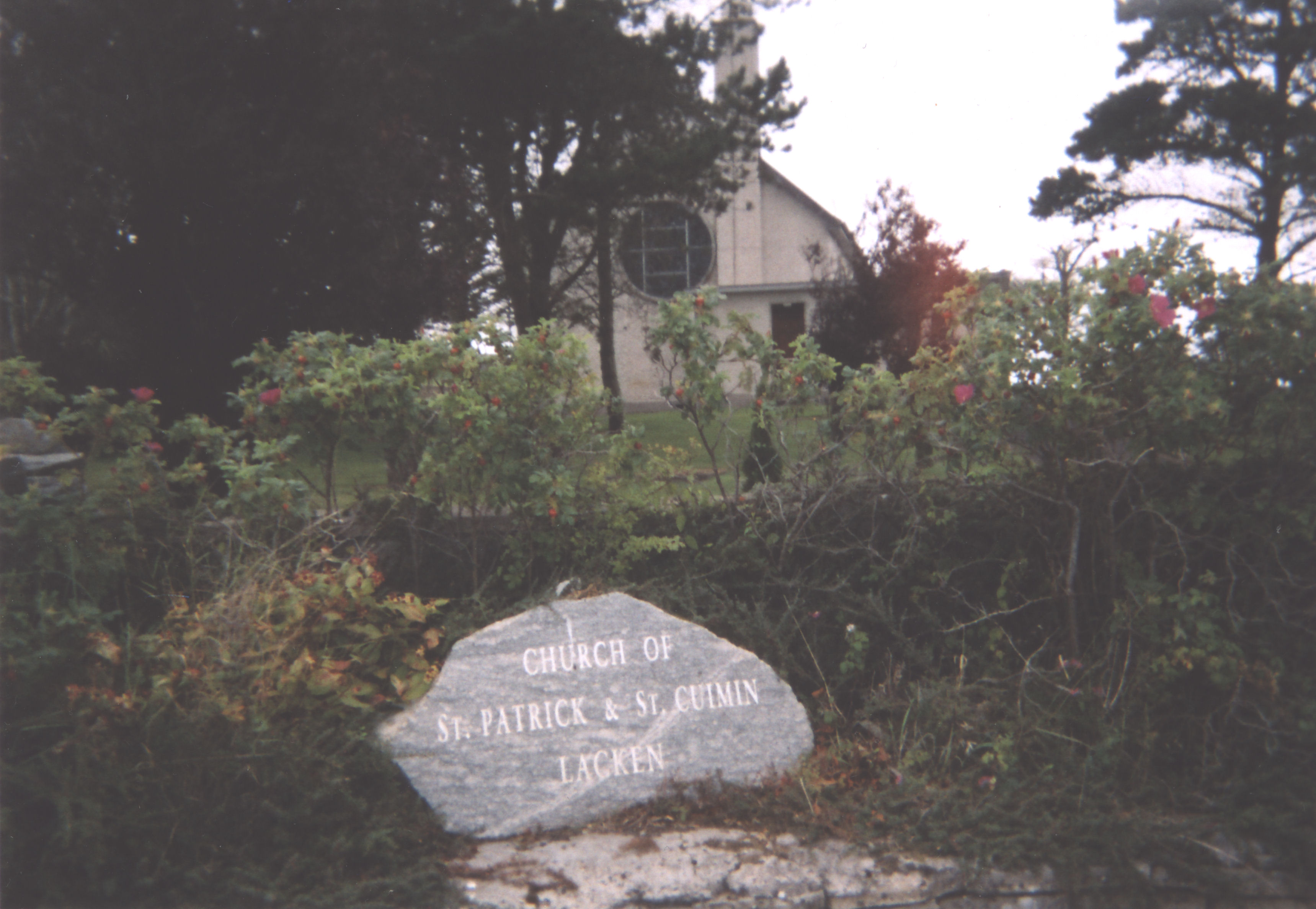
The church of St Patrick and St Cuimín in the parish of Lacken and Kilcummin.

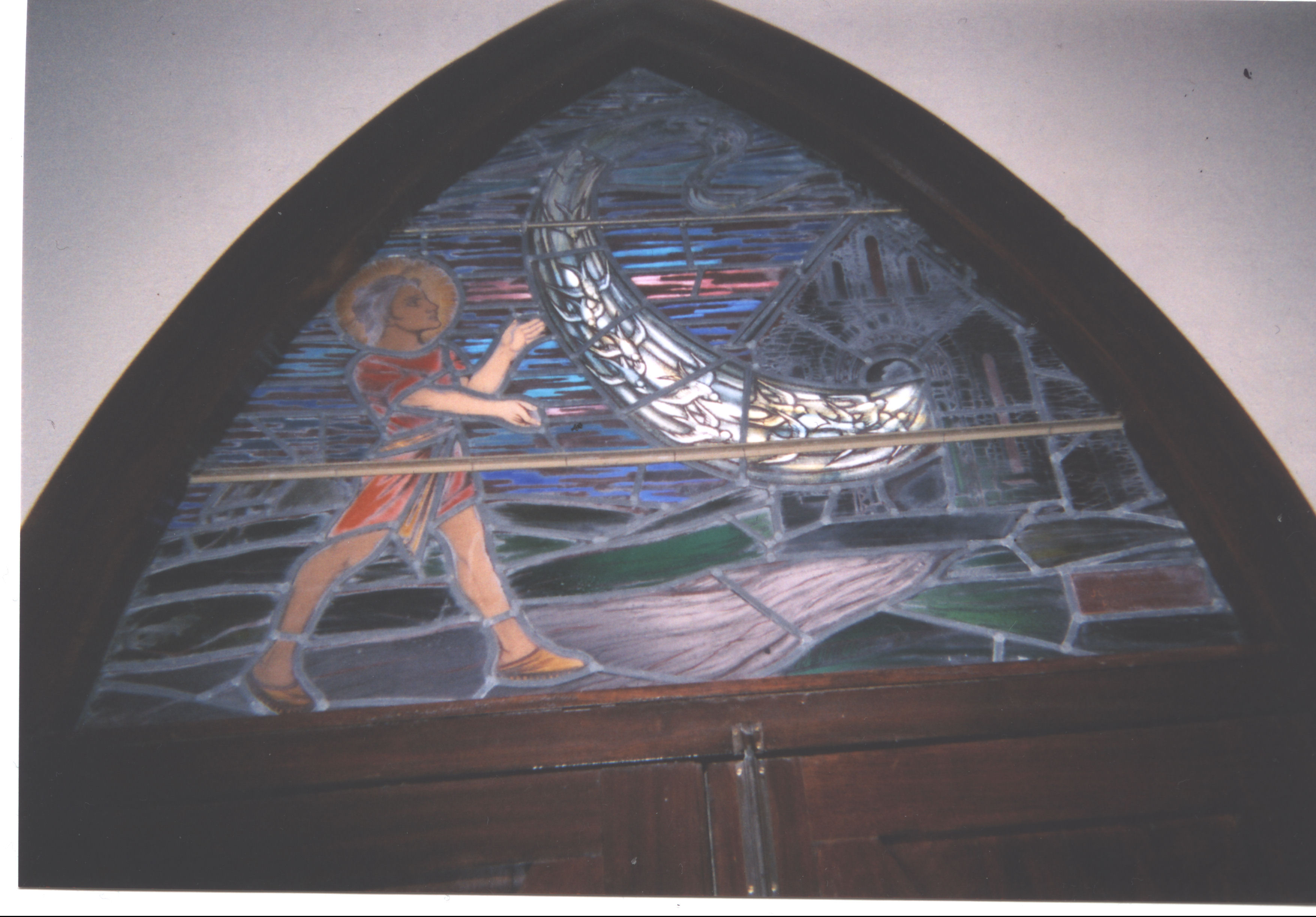
St Cuimín over the parish church door.

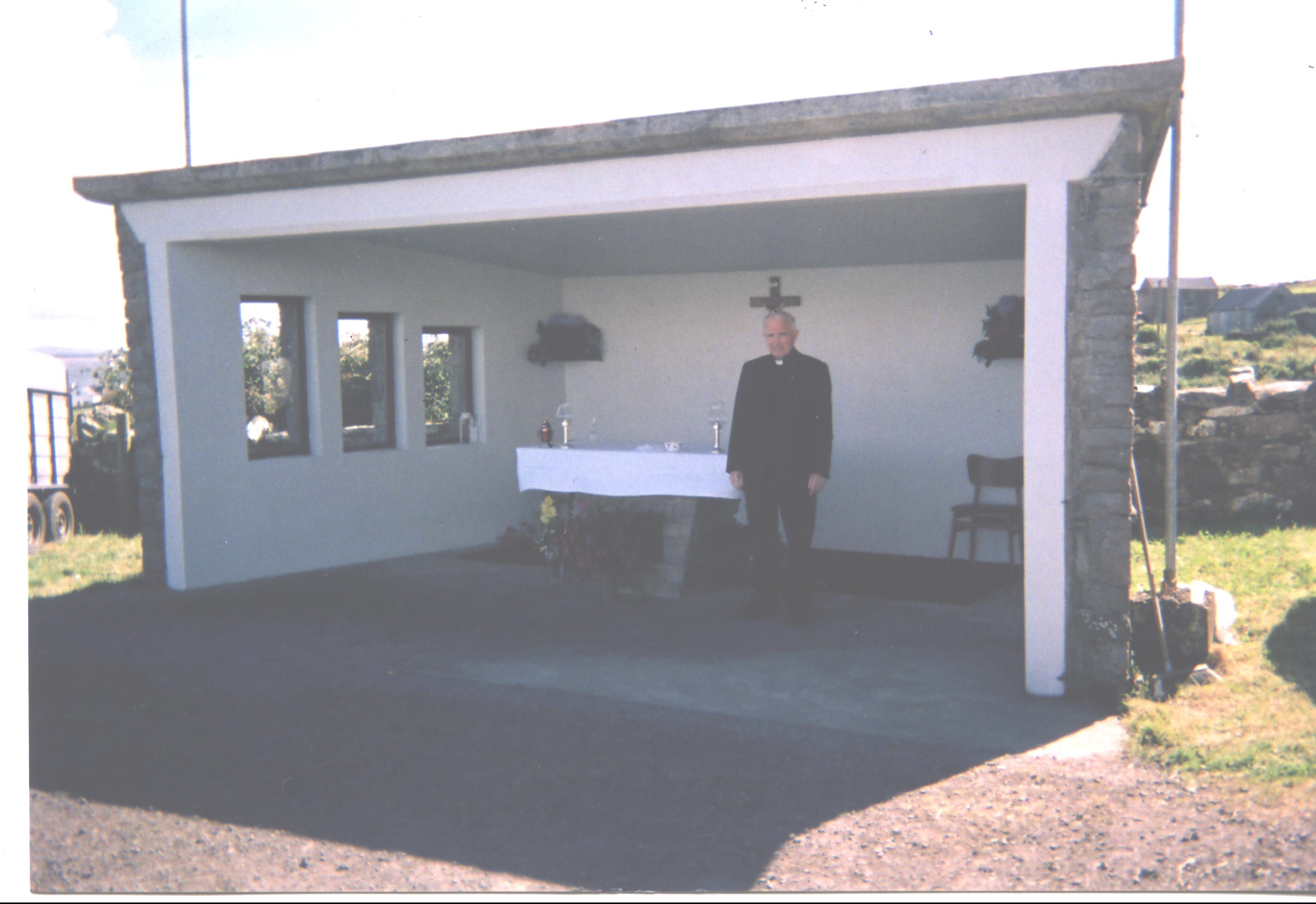
The shrine of St Cuimín with father Paddy Hegarty.

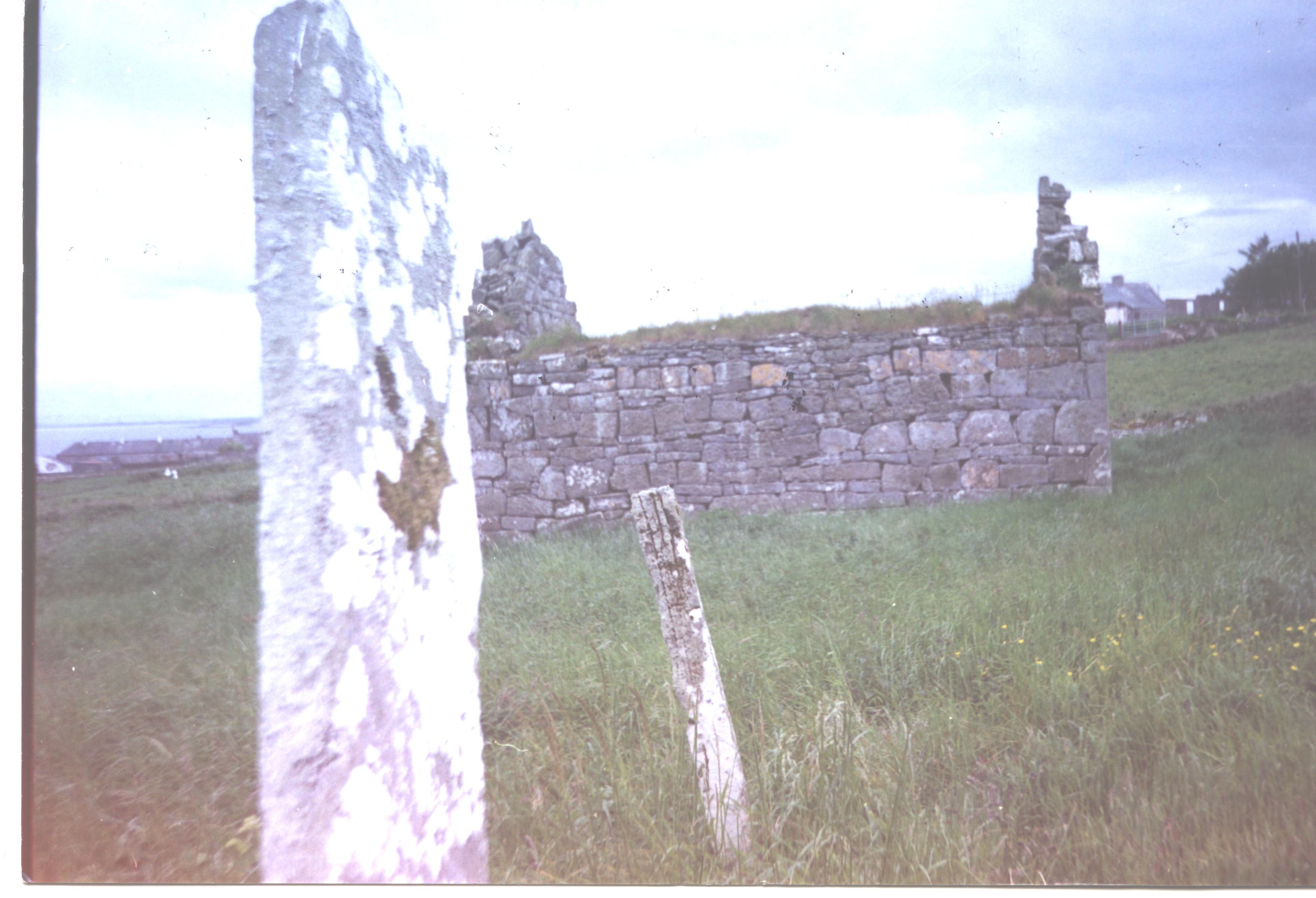
The headstone on the saint's grave and the ruins of his old church.
