= Banban the Wise =

Irish saint

Banban the Wise (fl. c. mid to late 5th century) was an Irish saint installed by St. Patrick as pastor of the Domnach Mór (Big Church) in Templeport, County Cavan, Ireland which was erected after destroying the idol of pre-Christian god Crom Cruach at the nearby plain of Magh Slécht.

== Name ==
Banban's name is rendered differently in a number of sources. The most common include Banbanus, Banbhanus, Mauranum cognomento Barbanum, alias Banbanum, Banuanus Sapiens. Others include Mabran Barbarus, Methbrain, Methbruin, Mauran, Niabrain, Nia Brain, Nie Brain, Niethbrain, Seannan. Some of the sources claim he was related to St. Patrick.

The Vita tripartita Sancti Patricii or Tripartite Life of St.Patrick, page 93 states- "Patrick founded a church in that stead, namely, Domnach Maighe Sleacht, and left therein Mabran [whose cognomen is] Barbarus Patricii, a relative of his and a prophet. And there is Patrick's well, wherein he baptized many. Then Patrick went into the province of Connaught by Snam da En over the Shannon."

Tírechán's Collections in the Book of Armagh states- "Patrick sent Nie Brain to the Moat of Slecht; (he was) a native close to Patrick, who made miraculous true prophecies (inspired) by God."

The Annals of the Four Masters state at 448 - "M448.2, 9- His sister's son was Banban, of fame;"

Flann's poem in The Yellow Book of Lecan states- "Seannan was his brother or cousin of fame"

Said by John Colgan to be a son of St.Patrick's sister, Richella. However "Barbanus" also means 'a paternal uncle'.

== Feast day ==
His feast-day is either 1 or 9 May. It may or may not be a coincidence that the next saint's name listed at 9 May in the Bollandists' Acta Sanctorum is St.Bricín of Tomregan which is also in Magh Slécht.

== Others of the name ==
Banban should not be confused with Colman Banban, Bishop of Leighlin & Kildare who died in 720 AD. His feastday is 26 November.
