= Cermand Cestach =

Cermand Cestach was the name of a gold-covered pagan cult image which stood in Clogher Cathedral, County Tyrone, Ireland until the Middle Ages. Alternative spellings are "Cermand Celstach", "Cermaed Celsetacht", "Kermand Kelstach", "Kerman Kelstach" and the Giant Ermand Kelstach.

== Historical references ==
The earliest reference to Cermand Cestach is in the Life of Saint Macartan of Clogher (C.430-505 A.D.):

"The Cloch-Oir (Golden Stone), from which this ancient diocese takes its name, was a sacred ceremonial stone to the druids, It was given to St. Macartin by an old pagan noble, who had harassed Macartin in every possible way until the saint's patient love won the local ruler to the faith. The stone is still preserved and the noble's son, Tighernach of Clones, succeed Macartin as bishop (Benedictines, D'Arcy, Farmer, Healy, Kenney, Montague, Muirhead, Needham)."

The 6th-century saint Tigernach was patron saint of Clones. His mother was Dervail or Derfraich, daughter of a King of Airgialla (Oriel) and his father was Cairpre Mac Fergusa from Leinster. The implication is that the idol originally came from Leinster.

In a gloss on the word "clochar" in the 15 August entry of the 8th-century manuscript Félire Óengusso (Martyrology of Oengus) for the Feastday of the Assumption of Mary, the gloss states

"there had once been a stone covered in gold which heathens worshipped: And out of it a devil used to speak: Cermand Cestach was his name, and it was the chief idol of the north. That is the short stone on thy right hand as thou enterest the temple of Clochar; and the places of the joints of gold and silver still remain in it."

The annalist Cathal Maguire, who died in 1498, stated that this stone-idol was still preserved as a curiosity in the porch of the Cathedral of Clogher in his time, so he was probably the glossator mentioned above as the gloss occurs in the copy of the Martyrology which was transcribed for him by Ruaidhrí Ó Luinín.

The 16th century Register of Clogher records A golden stone existing in the city of Clogher from which St.Patrick ejected the demon which gave prophetic responses.

Seán Ó Tuathhalláin (aka John Toland, 1669–1722) also wrote:

"The Bishop's See of Clogher has its name from one of these stones, all covered with gold (Clogher signifying the Golden Stone), on which stood Kermand Kelstach, the chief Idol of Ulster. The stone is still in being. Kermand Kelstach was not the only Mercury of rude stone, since the Mercury of the Greeks was not portray'd antiently in the shape of a youth, with wings to his heels and a caduceus in his hand, but without hands or feet, being a square stone, says Phurnutus, and I say without any sculpture."

== Later references ==
Lewis's Dictionary (1837), entry for Clogher:

"This place is said to have derived its name from a stone covered with gold, which in pagan times is reported to have made oracular responses. The Clogh-or, or "golden stone," was preserved long after the abolition of paganism; for McGuire, canon of Armagh, who wrote a commentary on the registry of Clogher, in 1490, says "that this sacred stone is preserved at Clogher, on the right of the entrance into the church, and that traces of the gold with which it had formerly been covered by the workshippers of the idol called Cermaed Celsetacht are still visible." There is still a very ancient stone lying on the south side of the cathedral tower, which many believe to be the real Clogh-or. It appears to have some very ancient characters engraved on it, but it evidently nothing more than the shaft of an antique cross of rude workmanship, of which there are several in the ancient cemetery. Clogher is called by Ptolemy Rhigia or Regia; and according to some authors, St. Patrick founded and presided over a monastery here, which he resigned to St. Kertenn when he went to Armagh, to establish his famous abbey there; but according to others, it was built at the command of St. Patrick in the street before the royal palace of Ergal, by St. Macartin, who died in 506, and from its vicinity to this palace both the abbey and the town appear anciently".

An old folk-tale from the Isle of Man entitled "The Story of the Isle of Falga", based on the Ulster Cycle states:- "Conchobar, who had not yet become King of Ulster, but was an ambitious young man seeking to gain a kingdom, consulted the famous oracle at Clogher as to how he might best attain his end. The oracle advised him to proceed to the Isle of Man and get Culann to make these weapons for him. Conchobar did so, and prevailed on Culann to begin his task; but, while awaiting its completion, he sauntered one morning along the shore, and in the course of his walk met with a mermaid fast asleep on the beach. He promptly bound the syren, but she, on waking and perceiving what had happened, besought him to liberate her; and to induce him to yield to her petition, she informed him that she was Teeval, the Princess of the Ocean; and promised that if he caused Culann to form her representation on the shield surrounded with this inscription, 'Teeval, Princess·of the Ocean,' it would possess such extraordinary powers that when ever he was about engaging his enemy in battle, and looked upon her figure on the shield, read the legend, and invoked her name, his enemies would diminish in strength, while he and his people would acquire a proportionate increase in theirs. Conchobar had the shield made according to the advice of Teeval, and, on his return to Ireland, such extraordinary success attended his arms, that he won the kingdom of Ulster. Culann accepted Conchobar's offer, referred to above, and settled on the plain of Murthemne, which was fabled to have been formerly situated beneath the sea. It was here that he was visited by Conchobar, accompanied by his Court and Cuchulainn."

In a book entitled "Omagh: Paintings and Stories from the Seat of the Chiefs" by Dr Haldane Mitchell, there is a local Tyrone folk-tale about a giant called "Ermand Kelstach" and Muckabaw who fought for the hand of Fionn mac Cumhaill's daughter Granua. They held a shoulder-stone throwing contest with stones the size and weight of a young mountain. One struck the top of Bessie Bell, where the mark is still seen to the present day.

An old 18th century or earlier ballad entitled "The Death of Leury" tells of the worshipping of the stone by King Laoghaire.

William Hamilton Drummond wrote a poem in 1826 entitled "Bruce's Invasion of Ireland" in which are found the following lines:- "Clogher stone, like the statue of Memnon renowned, Was heard to give forth an oracular sound."

Local tradition cherishes the conviction that the Cloch-Oir itself can be identified with a large stone that once stood against the north wall of St.Macartan's Cathedral and is now housed in the porch. The stone is decorated on both sides with raised plain borders. It is unworked on the reverse as though it originally formed part of an architectural feature like a doorway lintel. It is 1.67 metres in height. 0.44 metres across its front face and 0.57 metres on the broad side.

== Oracle interpretation ==
It seems Cermand Cestach was the name of the Oracle of Clogher, a stone which spoke through the Druids, somewhat like the Oracle of Delphi. The Dictionary of Celtic Mythology by James MacKillop gives 'Kerman Kelstach' as a variation of the god Crom Crúaich. They share several characteristics, e.g. 1. being oracle stones 2. being covered in gold 3. having the same initials CC 4. St. Patrick fights with them 5. The last day of the double-octave feast of Crom Crúaich was 15 August, which is the date on which Cermand Cestach is mentioned in the Calendar of Oengus gloss above. The website http://www.irishmegaliths.org.uk states:

"The Killycluggin Crom Cruach was one of three great oracle-stones in Ireland, the others being the Lía Fáil at Tara and the Cloch Óir at Clogher in County Tyrone."

== Other Irish oracle stones ==
=== Druim Tairleime ===
There is another oracle mentioned in The Metrical Dindshenchas, poem 102 on Druim Tairleime:

"Druim Tairleime, whence the name? Not hard to say. There was a talking stone there, since the time of the Tuatha De Danann, and a demon used to give answers from it. He used to tell every one to halt at it, to worship him. So that every one who passed by dismounted at it, and they used to worship him. Hence grew up the custom that none from that time onward approaches the hill without dismounting, as if they were under a ban not to pass by without stopping there. So from this usage grew up the habit of calling the hill Druim Tairleime from that time forth."

Hogan's Onomasticon gives the following entry:- Druim Tairléme:- Sa. 87 a; ¶ v. D. Tuirléime; ¶ "Drumtorlingy, Drumhurling, Drumhurlin, in Taghmon parish, Barony of Corkaree, County of Westmeath. Mis. 244(?)."

But it is more likely to be in County Meath, close to Tara, as Cath Maighe Léna states that the name of the hill where Conn of the Hundred Battles was killed was Druim Tuirléime.

=== Scarva ===
The old name for Scarva townland, County Down was Clonknaverly. The Ordnance Survey Namebooks of 1834 state there was "a pagan oracle or speaking pillar" there. It was said to have some connection or purpose with a large stone in County Armagh on the opposite side of the morass which divides the counties.
