= Masraige =

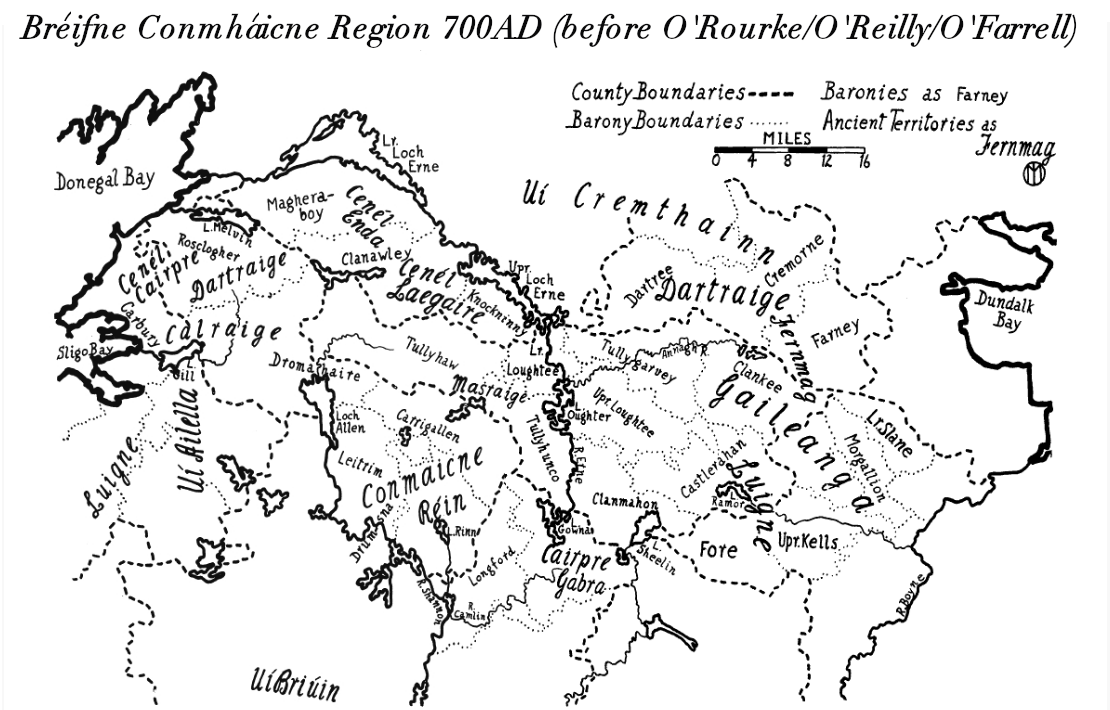
Map of Breifne in AD 700; the Masraige territory is in the centre.

The Masraige (Old Irish pronunciation: [ˈmasɾəɣʲe]) were a semi-legendary Fir Bolg tribe inhabiting Magh Slécht in County Cavan, Ireland. They were also called Masragii, Masraide, Masraidhe, Masruidhe, Mascraide, Masree, Macraighe or Mascraidhe. The name can be translated as "Beautiful/Fine-Looking/Handsome Folk", from Old Irish mass "fine, becoming, beautiful, handsome" and raige "pre-Gaelic tribe".

Masraige is mentioned in the Life of Dallán Forgaill as his birthplace.

In the Annals of the Four Masters, they are mentioned as having killed Conall Gulban -"M464.3 Conall Gulban, son of Niall of the Nine Hostages (from whom are descended the Cinel Conaill), was slain by the old tribes of Magh Slecht, he having been found unprotected, and was buried at Fidhnach Maighe Rein, by Saint Caillín, as the Life of the aforesaid saint relates."

The Book of Fenagh mentions them as follows:

Page 89

I prophesy thee, without anguish.

Give me my tribute every time, as Conall Gulban gave it. Conall was the first king of Tara, of the Clann-Neill, without dispute. 'Till he was slain in prosperous Magh-Rein, sixteen years he happily spent. The Masraighe went to the East once, on a great foray to Tara; Whereupon Conall quickly came, to Magh-Rein, in pursuit of them. A flying spear killed the king, on that journey, without falsehood, on Magh-Rein, at Dun-baile, of which the Masraighe boasted. Conall was interred in the earth,

between the Lake and the Dun.

Page 139

One time the Masraidhe of Magh-Slecht went on a predatory expedition

to Tara, when they brought a prey of horses with them from the east. Conall, on hearing the shoutings, proceeded with the small number that was near him at the time; and he ceased not from [pursuing] them until he came to Dun-Conaing on Magh-Rein, to wit, Fidhnacha at this day. And the old Tuatha-Slecht slew him, because he was unarmed; and that would not have been an occasion of slaughter to them, if luck had not willed. Or it is a flying spear that killed him. But whichever of them was his [manner of] death, it was the Masraidhe that committed the deed. Howsoever, the stone

and grave of Conall were placed on Magh-Rein, at Dun-Baile.

Page 145

Dun-Conaing was this place [called], till to day,

during the time of sixty prosperous kings, until Conall son of Niall fell, by the sons of the Liath, over the gap of treachery. Berna-in-braith was its name until this day, from the betrayal of Conall, the head of the host; Fidhnacha of Caillin son of Niata shall be its name, without falsehood, to the day of doom. In pursuit of horses he stoutly came, from the east, from Tara of the flocks, with a small company; 'twas a foolish journey, for he was slain by the old Tuatha-Slecht. Being without a shield against lance-thrusts was what caused the king his mortal wound. Too many men, and too many weapons,

found the man at a disadvantage.

The Masraige were one of the Aithechthúatha, a generic designation for certain Irish ethnic groups, usually translated as "rent-paying tribes", "vassal communities" or "tributary peoples". The term meant any tribe which did not belong to the ruling dynasties (such as Uí Néill or Eóganachta) who were overlords of the older tribes. The Masraige feature in an old Irish tale entitled Cairpre Cindchait and the Athach Tuatha The Masraige were conquered by the Uí Briúin Bréifne in the 8th century.
