= 1st century in Ireland =

Certain Medieval Chronicles record events in Ireland during the 1st century AD, but it is difficult to know how far they can be regarded as historical events, and should probably be regarded merely as legendary.

== Events ==
- AD 76 Battle of Aichill.
- AD 80 The Battle of Magh Slécht involving the High King Tuathal Techtmar

== Sources ==
- List of Published Texts at CELT — University College Cork's Corpus of Electronic Texts project
