= Kilcummin, County Mayo =

Civil parish in Ireland

Kilcummin Cill Chuimín
- Townland
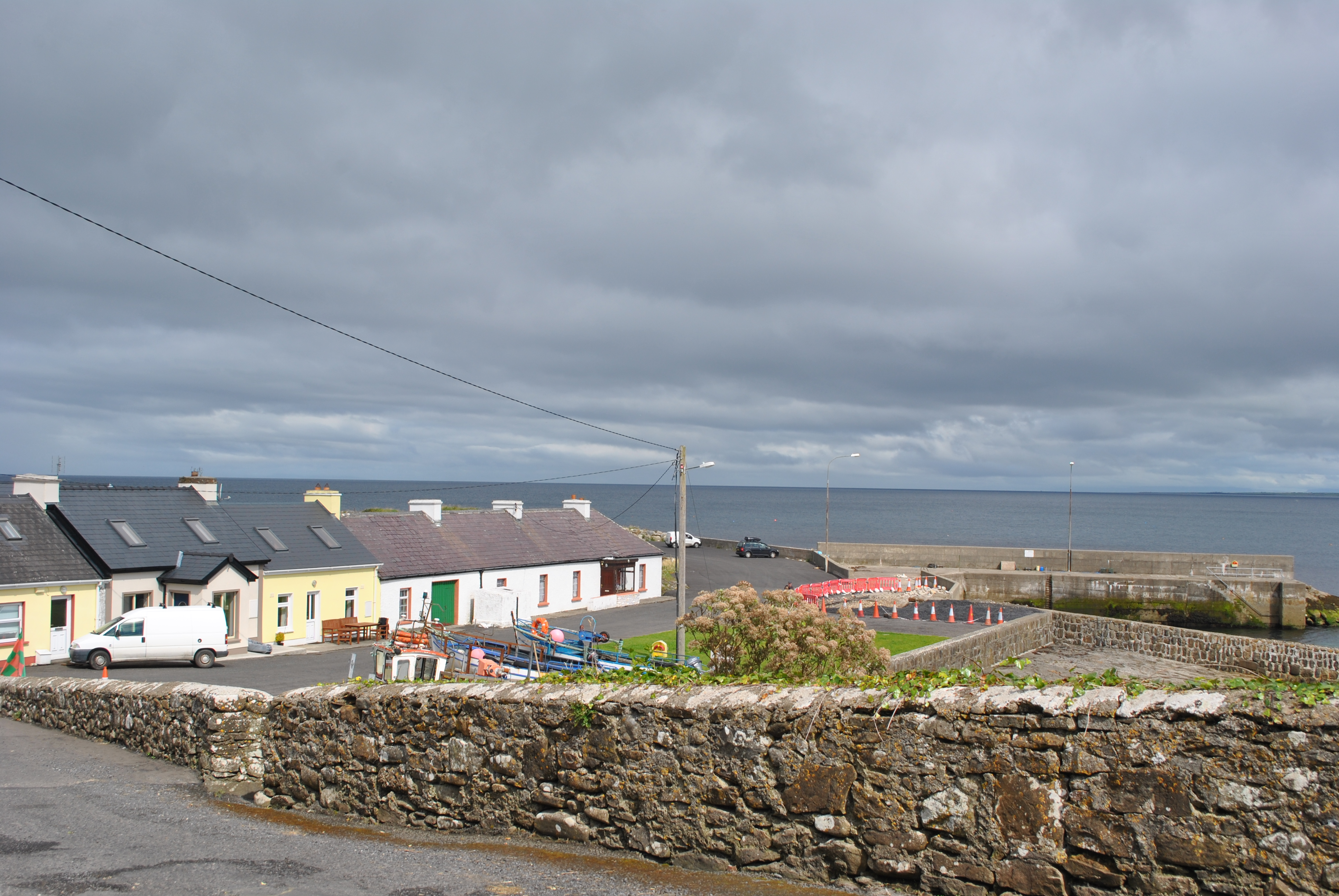
- Kilcummin pier

- Location in Ireland
- Coordinates: 54°16′44″N 9°12′50″W
- Country: Ireland
- Province: Connacht
- County: County Mayo
- Time zone: UTC+0 (WET)
  - Summer (DST): UTC-1 (IST (WEST))
- Irish Grid Reference: G206379

Kilcummin (Irish: Cill Chuimín) is a beachhead and civil parish on the northern coast of County Mayo in Ireland. Kilcummin was traditionally a fishing community.The "Tír Sáile - North Mayo Sculpture Trail" and "Tour d'Humbert" tourist route lead through the area. Kilcummin overlooks Lacken Bay, Kilcummin Back Strand (Carrowmore Beach) and lies on the opposite shore to Enniscrone and its beach in County Sligo.

== Name ==
Kilcummin is named after the early Irish saint Cuimín, and derives from the Irish Cill Chuimín, meaning "church of Cuimín". Other variants of the Irish spelling (seen on local signage) include "Cilcummin" and "Cill Chummín".

Prior to being named Kilcummin a map of Connaught from the 5th Century indicates that the area was originally known as "Forrac".

== History ==
The remains of the church of Saint Cuimín (for which the area is named) are still to be found in the local cemetery, along with a holy well at which to this day worshippers come to pray. Saint Cuimín's grave has been lost over the centuries, but it is believed that a group of stones in Kilcummin cemetery once belonged to his tomb.

Kilcummin is noted as the site where a French expedition commanded by General Humbert landed on 22 August 1798, in an attempt to assist Irish rebels during the 1798 rebellion. The French forces came ashore at Leac A' Chaonaigh (the 'moss covered rock') which is near Kilcummin. Humbert commanded three frigates, the Concorde, Franchise, and the Médée altogether carrying 1070 French forces, three cannon, and approximately 3000 muskets.

The area is home to two sculptures in the Tír Sáile North Mayo Sculpture Trail..

== Gallery ==
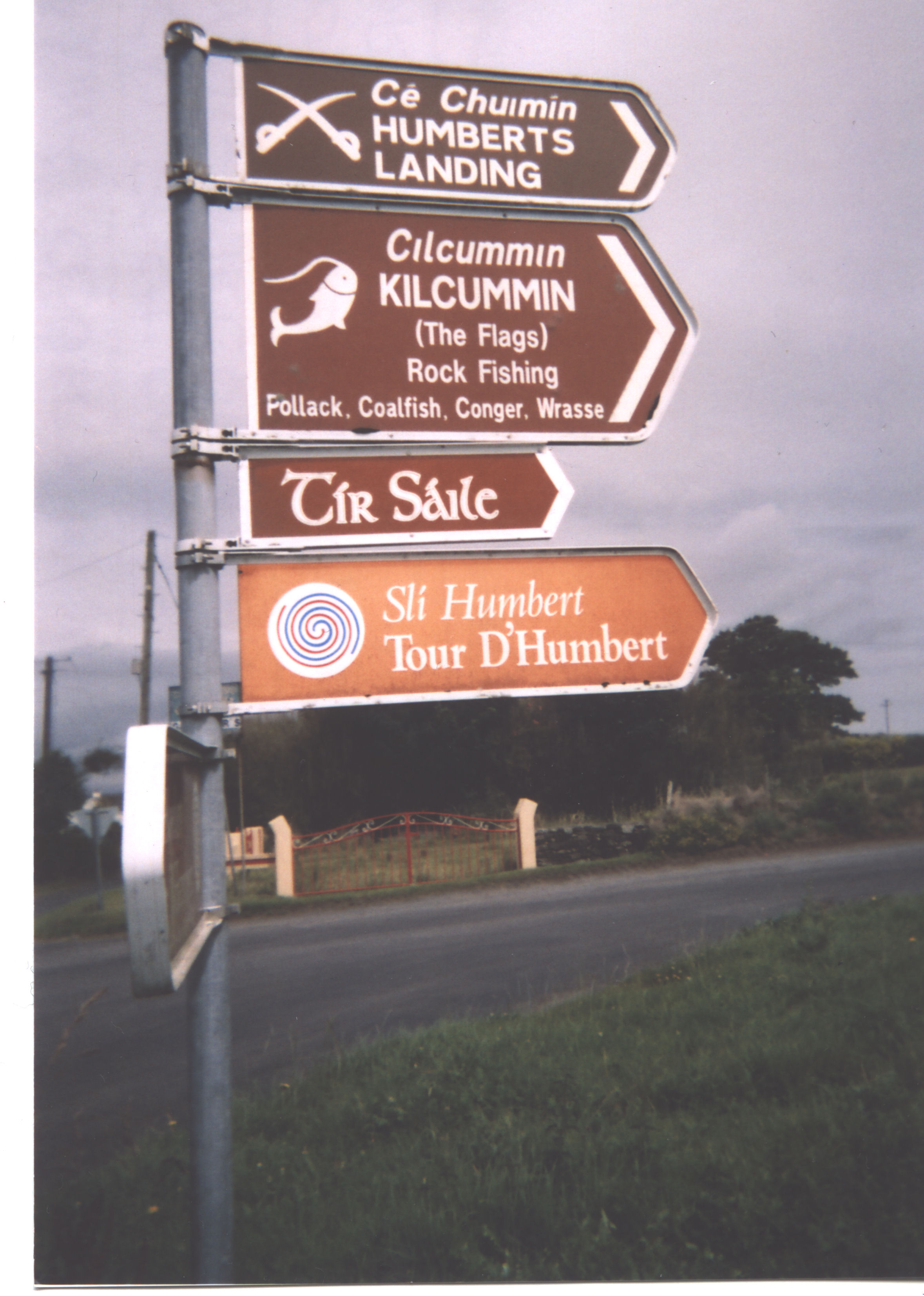
Signpost on the Lacken Road showing variant Irish spelling

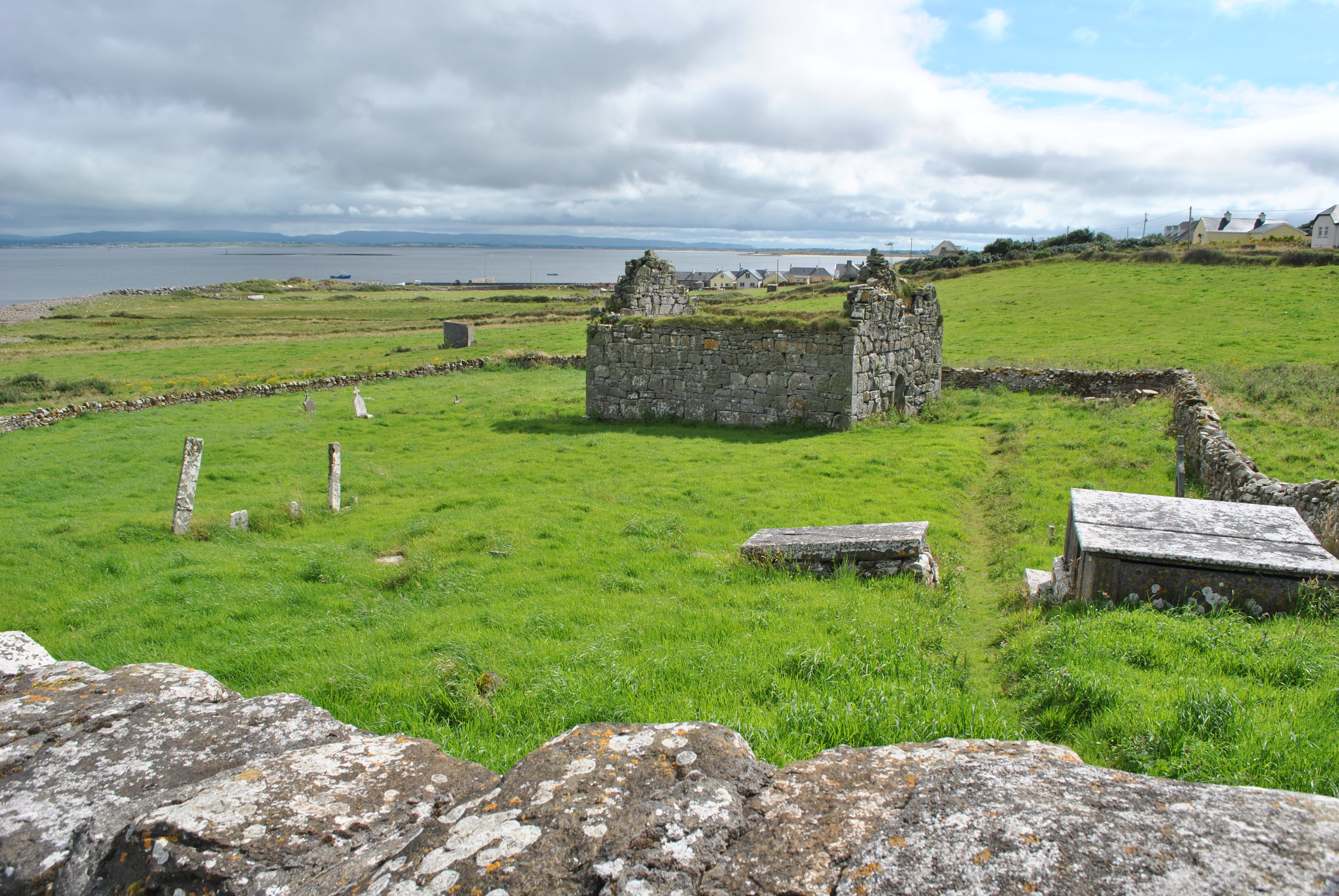
Kilcummin cemetery

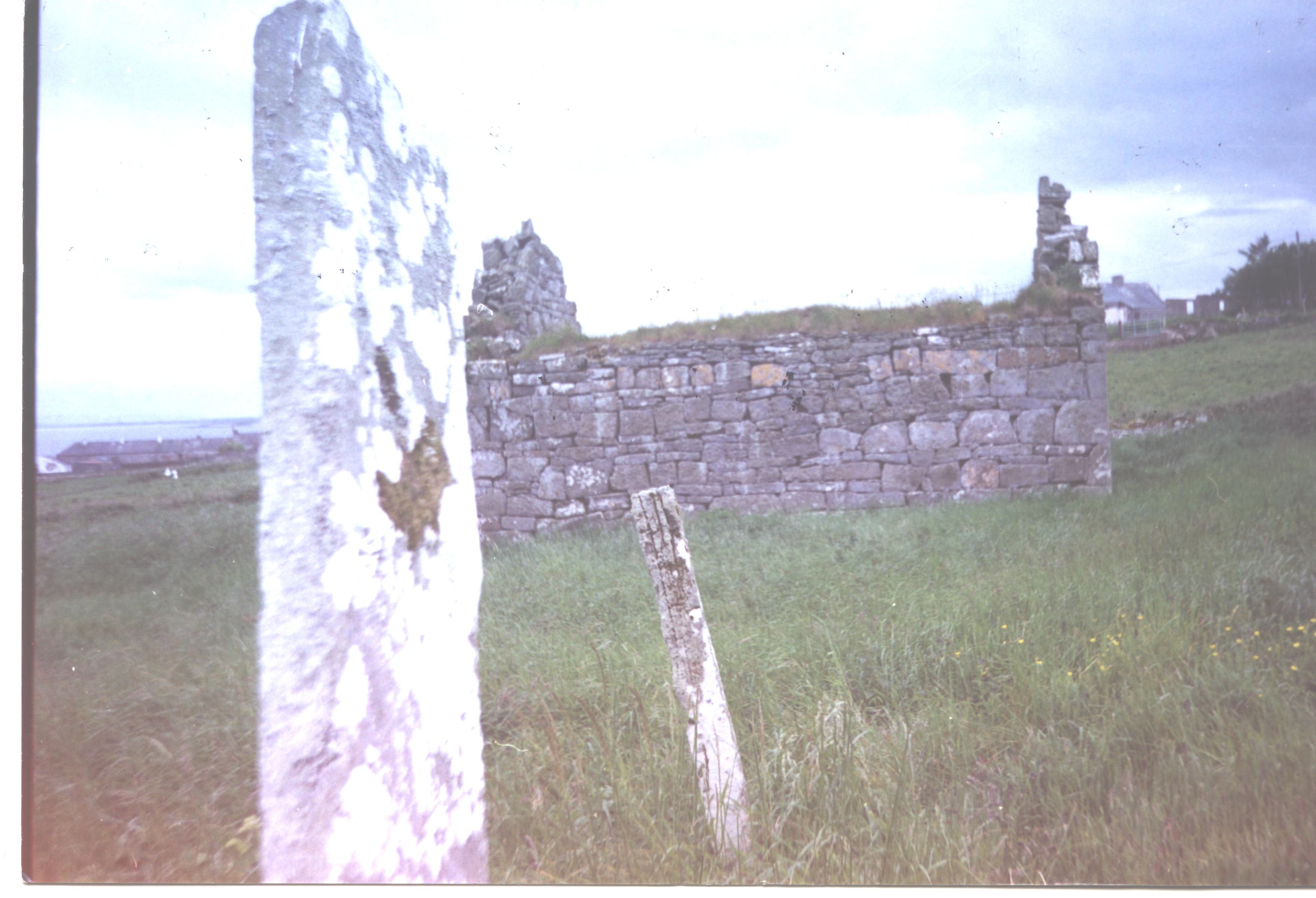
Headstone on the grave of St Cummin, with the old church of St Cummin (dated to pre-8th Century)

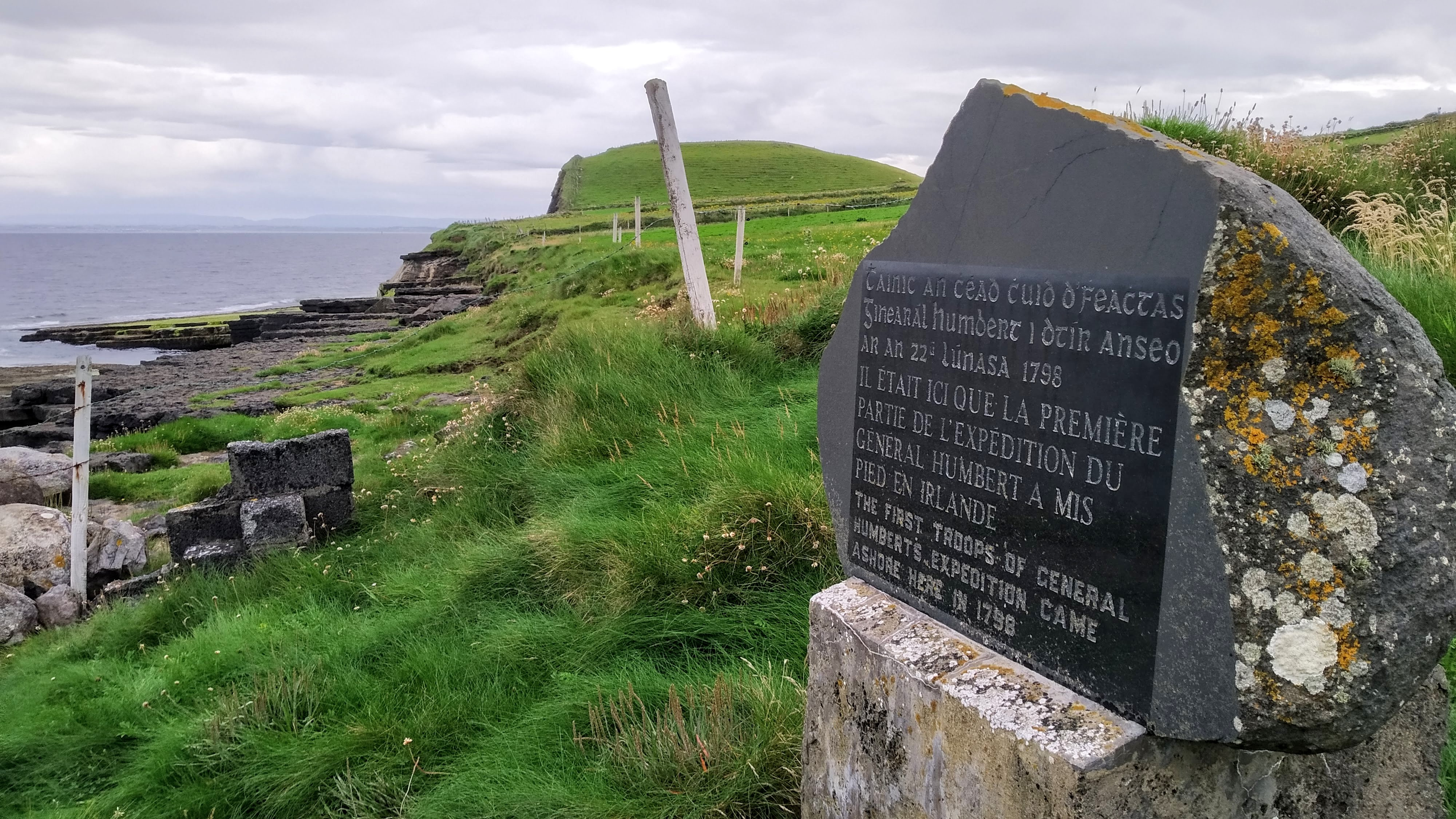
Leac A’ Chaonaigh - the site of the French Landing in 1798 near Kilcummin village.

Kilcummin Backstrand (Carrowmore Beach) and Lacken Bay
