= Magh Slécht =

Historic plain in Ireland

Coordinates: 54.08°N 7.66°W

Location of Magh Slécht in Ireland

Magh Slécht (sometimes Anglicised as Moyslaught; a variant of Magh Lecht meaning a grave-strewn plain, because of all the ancient stone tombs therein) is the name of a historic plain in Ireland. It comprises an area of about three square miles (8 km^{2}) situated in the south-eastern part of the Parish of Templeport, Barony of Tullyhaw, in the west of County Cavan. It is bounded on the south by Templeport Lough, on the north by Slieve Rushen mountain, on the east by the Shannon–Erne Waterway, and on the west by the River Blackwater. Magh Slécht formed part of the Province of Connacht until the late 16th century, when it was made part of the Province of Ulster by the English Crown.

It was originally named Magh Senaig (plain of the hill-slope) and under this guise is mentioned in The Metrical Dindshenchas in the story of the Dagda, Corrgenn and Ailech, wherein it states the Corrgenn travelled from Tara to Lough Foyle in the Inishowen peninsula via Mag Senaig.

In Pre-Christian times the small area where the Crom Cruach idol stood at Killycluggin and Kilnavert was originally named Fossa Slécht or Rath Slécht and it is from this small location that the wider Magh Slécht area received its name. In 1911 BC during the reign of Fodbgen, the Firbolg High-King of Ireland, the name Magh Senaig was changed to Magh Slécht (The plain of prostrations) as it became the nationwide centre of the cult of the god Crom Cruach. Another interpretation is Magh Sleacht meaning the Plain of the Monument.

St. Patrick is said to have thrown down Crom Cruaich when he stretched out the Bachal Isu from a neighbouring hill causing it to fall over with its head pointing toward the Hill of Tara. The twelve surrounding idols were then swallowed up by the earth.

Another name for the plain was Magh Lecet or Magh Leced. The ancient Irish prayed by prostrating themselves in a similar fashion to today's Muslims, i.e. by kneeling down on both knees and touching the forehead against the earth [citation needed]. The plain is not flat but consists of little drumlin hills. However, as it is surrounded by mountains, it is a plain in comparison. In the old Irish tale The Siege of Druim Damhgaire or Knocklong (Forbhais Droma Dámhgháire), one of King Cormac Mac Art's druids was called Cecht of Magh Slécht.

== Occupation ==
This area has been in constant occupation from pre-4000 BC up to the present day, as is evidenced by the huge number of ancient monuments which still survive. In a small area of 3 square miles (7.8 km^{2}) there are over 80 monuments of different types, with many others bound to be discovered by future archaeological searches. It is the densest grouping of such monuments in County Cavan and possibly in Ireland.

Included are

- 9 megalithic tombs
- 7 Ring barrows
- 3 different stone circles
- 9 different standing stones
- 2 stone-rows
- 5 enclosures
- 6 crannogs
- 33 ráths or souterrains
- 3 Early-Christian church-sites
- 2 Early-Christian Holy Wells
- 2 Bullauns
- 2 Medieval castles

The area was first inhabited by Neolithic hunter-gatherers who arrived via the river (originally called the Gráinne river & now canalised as the Woodford Canal or the Shannon-Erne Waterway). The first named inhabitants were the Masraige tribe who ruled Magh Slécht until they were conquered by the Uí Briúin tribe in the 8th century AD. The Masraighe were also called the Sons of the Liath or the Tuatha Slécht and Magh Slécht was sometimes called Liathmhuine. It is of interest that Conall Gulban, the first nobleman baptised by St. Patrick, thus opening the way for the conversion of the ruling classes of Ireland, was murdered by the Masraige at Magh Slécht (County Cavan) in 464. He was buried by Saint Caillin at Fenagh, County Leitrim. The descendants of the Ui Briuin included the McGovern clan who are still the most numerous surname in the area.

== Historical events ==
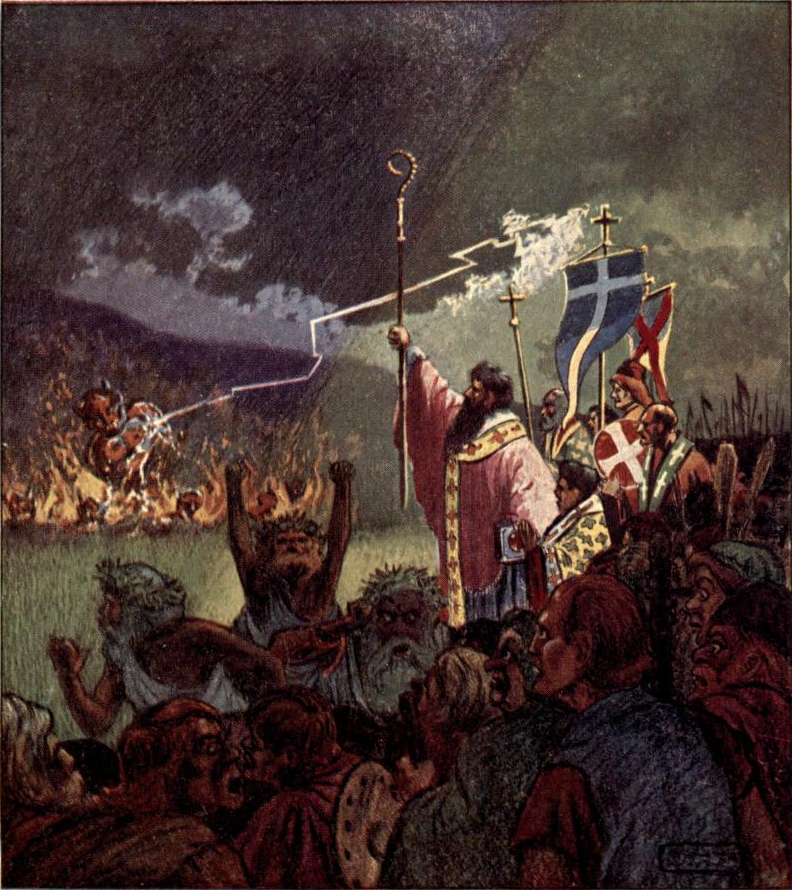
St Patrick casts down Cromm Cruach and the twelve idols; from a 1911 illustration by Curtis Dunham.

The main events in the history of Magh Slécht as listed in the ancient sources are

1. The Journey of Corrgenn through Mag Senaig in 2000 BC
2. The killing of Regan, the Fomorian, at Tomregan in 1860 BC.
3. The death of the High King of Ireland, Tigernmas, & 4,000 of his followers in the Seventh Plague of Ireland while worshipping Crom Cruaich on 31 October (Samhain, Halloween), 1413 B.C. His grave there is marked by a standing stone.
4. The Battle of Tuaim Drecain (Tomregan) in 1342 BC by the High King Eochaid Faebar Glas.
5. The murder of the Ulster hero Conall Cernach in the 1st century BC at Áth na Mianna (Ballyconnell). His grave is supposedly marked by a hilltop cairn.
6. The Battle of Magh Slecht in 80 AD by the High King Tuathal Techtmar
7. The battle of Luachair beyond Mag Slecht by King Cormac mac Airt in 239 A.D.
8. The killing of the druid Cecht of Magh Slécht in 246 AD by the druid Mug Ruith and the Army of Munster at the Siege of Knocklong
9. The destruction of the idol Crom Cruach (The La Tène Killycluggin Stone) by Saint Patrick in the 5th century AD and the founding of a church there at Fossa Slécht under St. Banban the Wise.
10. The murder of King Conall Gulban of Tír Chonaill, a kingdom in west Ulster, by the Masraige in 464 AD.
11. The birth of St. Dallan Forgaill, the Chief Ollam of Ireland, in c.530 AD
12. The birth of St. Mogue (also known as Saint Aidan of Ferns) in 550 AD
13. The foundation of the University of Tuaim Drecain (Tomregan) by the Synod of Drumceat in 584 AD.
14. The murder of the relatives of King Báetán mac Muirchertaig in 620 AD
15. The Battle of Magh Slécht in 1256 AD, between a united Breifne–Connacht force and the forces of the O'Reilly and House Burke.

== See also ==
- Tomas Óg Mág Samhradháin
