= Cathal Óg Mac Maghnusa =

Irish historian

Cathal Óg Mac Maghnusa (February 1439 – March 1498) was an Irish historian. He was the principal compiler of the Annals of Ulster, along with the scribe Ruaidhrí Ó Luinín. He was also chief of the McManus clan from 1488 to 1498.
