= Crom Cruach =

Irish pagan sun and fertility god

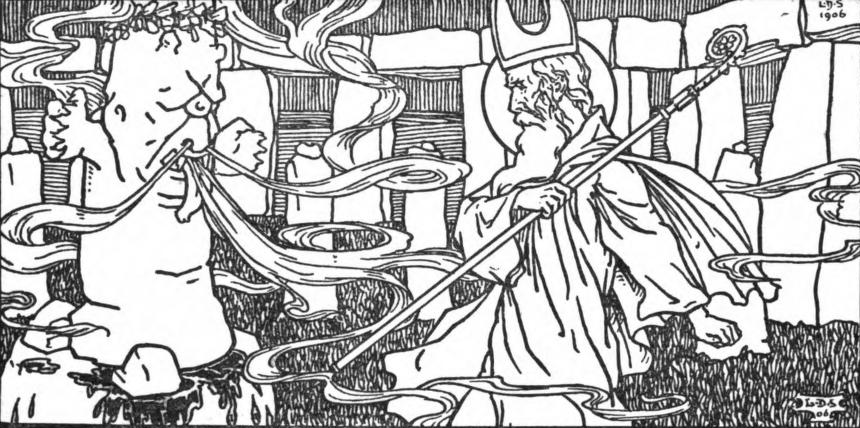
Crom Cruaich and St. Patrick. Illustrated by L.D. Symington.

Crom Cruach (Old Irish: Cromm Crúaich [kɾom ˈkɾuːa̯xʲ]) was a pagan god of pre-Christian Ireland. According to Christian writers, he was propitiated with human sacrifice and his worship was ended by Saint Patrick.

He is also referred to as Crom Cróich, Cenn Cruach/Cróich ([kʲen̪ː ˈkɾuːa̯x]) and Cenncroithi ([kʲen̪ː ˈkɾoθʲi]). He is related to the later mythological and folkloric figure Crom Dubh.

The references in a dinnsenchas ("place-lore") poem in the 12th century to sacrifice in exchange for milk and grain suggest that Crom had a function as a fertility god. The description of his image as a gold figure surrounded by twelve stone or bronze figures has been interpreted by some as representing the sun surrounded by the signs of the zodiac, suggesting a function as a solar deity.

== Name ==
Crom Cruach's name takes several forms. Crom (or cromm) means "bent, crooked, stooped" or according to O'Reilly is perhaps related to cruim meaning "thunder". Cenn means "head", and by extension "head, chief". Cruach (or crúach) is a noun meaning "pile, heap, mound, stack", generally of grain, hay, peat or other gathered goods, bounty, and so on, including slaughtered fighters. A common extension is its reference to hills or mountains that look like stacks or piles.

Crom Cruach is called the chief Celtic idol of Ireland by Michael J. O'Kelly, and was located on Magh Slécht (The Plain of Prostrations) near Killycluggin County Cavan, surrounded by twelve other idols.

== Literary references ==
According to an Irish dinsenchas ("place-lore") poem in the 12th century Book of Leinster, Crom Cruach's cult image, consisting of a gold figure surrounded by twelve stone figures, stood on Magh Slécht ("the plain of prostration") (pronounced Moy Shlokht) in County Cavan, and was propitiated with first-born sacrifice in exchange for good yields of milk and grain. Crom Cruach is described as a wizened god, hidden by mists, and is said to have been worshipped since the time of Érimón. An early High King, Tigernmas, along with three quarters of his army, is said to have died while worshipping Crom on Samhain eve, but worship continued until the cult image was destroyed by St. Patrick with a sledgehammer.

This incident figures prominently in medieval legends about St. Patrick, although it does not appear in his own writings, nor in the two 7th century biographies by Muirchu and Tírechán. However J.B. Bury, infers that there is a missing passage in Tírechán about Crom Cruaich; Ludwig Bieler, who edited the two biographies, is non-committal on the point.

In the 9th century Tripartite Life of Saint Patrick the deity is called Cenn Cruach, and his cult image consists of a central figure covered with gold and silver, surrounded by twelve bronze figures. When Patrick approaches it he raises his crozier, the central figure falls face-down, with the imprint of the crozier left in it, and the surrounding figures sink into the earth. The "demon" who inhabits the image appears, but Patrick curses him and casts him to hell. Jocelin's 12th century Life and Acts of St. Patrick tells much the same story. Here the god is called Cenncroithi, interpreted as "the head of all gods", and when his image falls the silver and gold covering it crumble to dust, with the imprint of the crozier left on bare stone.

== Archaeology ==
A decorated stone known as the Killycluggin Stone (from Irish Coill an Chlogáin, meaning 'the Wood of the Bell-Shaped Stone') has been interpreted by some as the cult image of Crom Cruach. It was found at Killycluggin, County Cavan. It was discovered broken in several pieces and partly buried close to a Bronze Age stone circle (54.090773, -7.634122), inside which it probably once stood.

The 14th century Book of McGovern, written in Magh Slécht, contains a poem which states that Crom was situated at Kilnavert beside the road and that the local women used to tremble in fear as they passed by. There is still a local tradition in the area that the Killycluggin Stone is the Crom stone.

There is another standing stone identified with Crom Crúaich in Drumcoo townland, County Fermanagh. It has the figure of a man walking engraved on it, representing either Saint Patrick or a druid, depending on when it was engraved. A nearby street is named Crom Crúaich Way after it.

A large wooden idol from the 4th century AD has recently been discovered in Gortnacrannagh, County Roscommon.

== See also ==
- Cermand Cestach
- Crom Dubh
- Crom (fictional deity)
- Macroom
- Metrical Dindshenchas
- Annals of the Four Masters
