= Edmund MacGuire =

Edmund MacGuire was a priest in Ireland during the 15th century.

The son of Peter MacGuire, Bishop of Clogher from 1433 to 1447, he was Archdeacon of Clogher until his death on 14 April 1471.
