= Bishop of Clogher =

Northern Irish episcopal titles

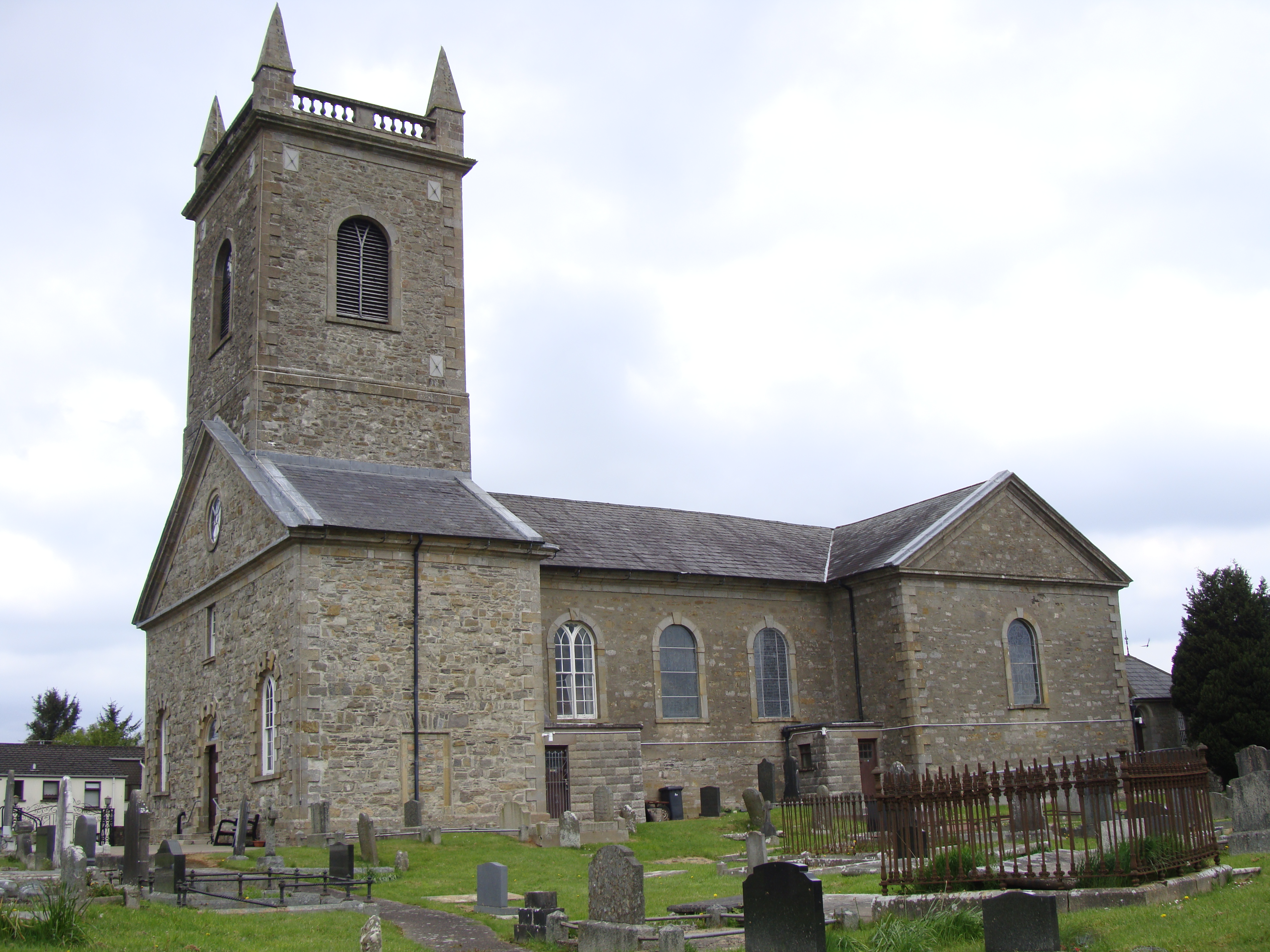
The Cathedral Church of Saint Macartan, Clogher, the episcopal seat of the pre-Reformation and Church of Ireland bishops.

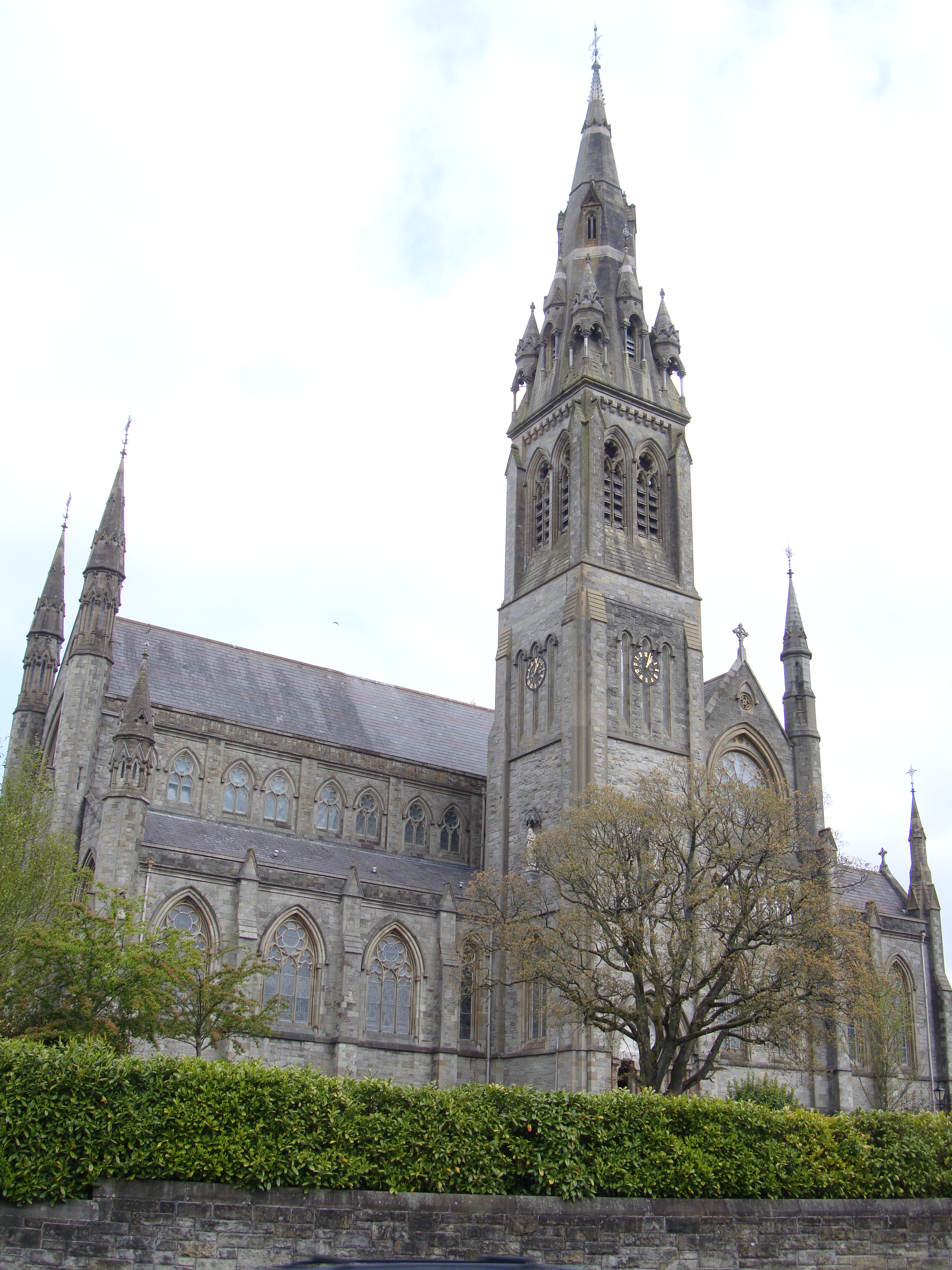
The Cathedral Church of Saint Macartan, Monaghan, the episcopal seat of the Post-Reformation Roman Catholic bishops.

The Bishop of Clogher (/ˈklɔː.ər/, /ˈklɒ.hər/) is an episcopal title which takes its name after the village of Clogher in County Tyrone, Northern Ireland. Following the Reformation, there are now parallel apostolic successions: one of the Church of Ireland and the other of the Roman Catholic Church.

== History ==
Clogher is one of the twenty-four dioceses established at the Synod of Ráth Breasail in 1111 and consists of much of south west Ulster, taking in most of counties Fermanagh and Monaghan and parts of Tyrone, Cavan, Leitrim and Donegal. Frequently in the Irish annals the Bishop of Clogher was styled the Bishop of Oirialla. Between c. 1140 to c. 1190, County Louth was transferred from the see of Armagh to the see of Clogher. During this period the Bishop of Clogher used the style Bishop of Louth. The title Bishop of Clogher was resumed after 1193, when County Louth was restored to the see of Armagh.

== Present Ordinaries ==
In the Church of Ireland

The present Church of Ireland bishop is the Right Reverend Dr. Ian W. Ellis, elected in September 2020 and consecrated in April 2021 The Church of Ireland bishop is unique in having two diocesan cathedrals within a single diocese, with one Dean and chapter between them: the Cathedral Church of Saint Macartin, Enniskillen and the Cathedral Church of Saint Macartan, Clogher.

In the Roman Catholic Church

The current Roman Catholic bishop is the Most Reverend Lawrence Duffy who was appointed by the Holy See on 8 December 2018 and ordained bishop on 10 February 2019. The Roman Catholic bishop's seat (cathedra) is located at the Cathedral Church of Saint Macartan, Monaghan.

== Pre-Reformation bishops ==
Pre-Reformation Bishops of Clogher
From	Until	Incumbent	Notes
unknown	1135	Cináeth Ua Baígill	Died in office.
1135	1138	Christian of Clogher	Irish: Gilla Críst Ua Morgair; died in office.
1138	1140	Áed Ua Cáellaide	Edanus; Canon Regular; styled Bishop of Louth from 1140.
Bishops of Louth
From	Until	Incumbent	Notes
1140	1178	Áed Ua Cáellaide	Resigned before May 1178; died in office on 29 March 1182.
1178	1186/87	Mael Ísu Ua Cerbaill	Maelisu O'Carroll; Malachias; elected before 18 May 1178; also Archbishop of Armagh from 1184; died in office.
c.1187	1193	Gilla Críst Ua Mucaráin	Christianus; died in office.
Pre-Reformation Bishops of Clogher
From	Until	Incumbent	Notes
1194	1197	Máel Ísu Ua Máel Chiaráin OCist	Died in office.
c.1197	1218	Gilla Tigernaig Mac Gilla Rónáin	Thomas; died in office.
c.1218	1227	Donatus Ó Fidabra	Donat Fury; Donat O'Feery; translated to Armagh c. August 1227
1227	1240	Nehemias Ó Brácáin OCist	Elected in September 1227; consecrated c. 1228; died in office before 15 November 1240.
1240	1245	See vacant	Probably due to the action by Donatus Archbishop of Armagh who was seeking to unite the two sees of Armagh and Clogher.
c.1245	1267	David Ó Brácáin OCist	Elected c. 1245; died in office.
1268	1287	Michael Mac an tSáir	Elected in 1268; consecrated 9 September 1268; resigned before 1287; died 1288.
1287	c.1310	Matthaeus Mac Cathasaig (I)	Elected in 1287; consecrated 29 June 1287; died in office.
fl. 1310	c.1316	Henricus	Died in office.
c.1316	1319	Gelasius	Cornelius Ó Bánáin; elected and consecrated c. 1316; died in office.
1320	1356	Nicolaus Mac Cathasaigh	Elected on 23 February 1320; consecrated in 1320; died in office.
1356	1358	Brian Mac Cathmhaoil	Bernardus; elected after September 1356; appointed c. 1357; died in office.
c. 1361	unknown	Matthaeus Mac Cathasaigh (II)	Elected c. 1361; consecrated after February 1362.
unknown	1369	Aodh Ó hEóthaigh	Odo (or Hugh) Ó Neill; died on 27 July 1369.
1373	c. 1389	Johannes Ó Corcráin OSB	Johannes Würzburg; appointed on 6 April 1373; died in office.
1390	1432	Art Mac Cathmhaoil	Appointed on 15 February 1390; consecrated before 28 April 1390; died in office on 10 August 1432.
1433	1447	Piaras Mag Uidhir	Petrus; appointed on 31 August 1433; resigned before July 1447; died in office on 5 December 1450.
1447	1483	Rossa mac Tomáis Óig Mág Uidhir	Rogerius; Ross Maguire; appointed on 21 July 1447; consecrated before 6 January 1450; died in office.
1475		Florence Woolley OSB	Appointed on 20 November 1475 on apparently the false news of Rossa's resignation; did not gain possession of the see; acted as a suffragan bishop in the Diocese of Norwich from 1478 until his death in 1500.
1484		Niall mac Séamuis Mac Mathghamhna	Appointed before 14 June 1484, but the papal bulls were not expedited; died in 1488.
1484	1502	John Edmund de Courcy OFM	Appointed 14 June 1484; papal bulls expedited 12 September 1484; also Bishop of Ross from 26 September 1492.
1494		Séamus mac Pilib Mac Mathghamhna	James McMahon; appointed on 5 November 1494, but did take effect; later became Bishop of Derry on 26 November 1503.
1500	1502	Andreas (coadjutor)	Appointed coadjutor on 10 June 1500 to Bishop de Courcy; the see was declared void by the resignation of de Courcy when Ó Cluainín was appointed.
1502	1503	Nehemias Ó Cluainín OESA	Appointed on 24 January 1502; resigned.
1504	1504	Giolla Pádraig Ó Connálaigh	Appointed on 6 March 1504; died before December 1504; also known as Patricius.
1505	1515	Eoghan Mac Cathmhaoil	Eugenius; Owen McCaul; appointed on 4 April 1505; died in office.
1517	1534	Pádraig Ó Cuilín OESA	Patrick O'Cullen; appointed on 11 February 1517; died in office before 26 March 1534.

== Post-Reformation bishops ==
=== Church of Ireland succession ===
Church of Ireland Bishops of Clogher
From	Until	Incumbent	Notes
1535	1569	Hugh O'Carolan	Appointment by Pope Paul III on 6 August 1535; consecrated in January 1537; renounced papal appointment on 1 October 1542; confirmed (re-appointed) by King Henry VIII on 8 October 1542; died in office.
1570	1571	Miler Magrath	Roman Catholic Bishop of Down and Connor; accepted royal supremacy in 1567; appointed to Clogher by letters patent on 18 September 1570; translated to Cashel on 3 February 1571.
1571	1603	See vacant	
1603		Denis Campbell	Dean of Limerick; nominated to Clogher, Derry and Raphoe in 1603, but died before consecration in July 1603.
1603	1605	See vacant	
1605	1621	George Montgomery	Nominated on 15 February 1605 and appointed by letters patent on 13 June 1605; also held Derry and Raphoe 1605 to 1609, and Meath 1609 to 1621; died in office 15 January 1621.
1621	1645	James Spottiswood	Nominated on 20 January 1621; mandate for consecration on 22 October 1621; died in office in March 1645; his brother John was Archbishop of St Andrews 1615–1639.
1645	1661	Henry Jones	Nominated on 29 September and consecrated on 9 November 1645; translated to Meath on 25 May 1661; his father Lewis was Bishop of Killaloe 1633–1646.
1661	1671	John Leslie	Translated from Raphoe; nominated on 29 April 1661 and appointed by letters patent on 17 June 1661; died in office on 8 September 1671.
1671	1672	Robert Leslie	Translated from Raphoe; appointed by letters patent on 26 October 1671; died in office on 10 August 1672.
1672	1687	Roger Boyle	Translated from Down and Connor; nominated on 29 August 1672 and appointed by letters patent on 19 September 1672; died in office on 26 November 1687.
1687	1690	See vacant	
1691	1697	Richard Tennison	Translated from Killala and Achonry; nominated on 4 December 1690 and appointed by letters patent on 28 February 1691; translated to Meath on 25 June 1697.
1697	1717	St George Ashe	Translated from Cloyne; nominated on 1 June 1697 and appointed by letters patent 25 June 1697; translated to Derry on 25 February 1717.
1717	1745	John Stearne	Translated from Dromore; nominated on 28 February 1717 and appointed by letters patent on 30 March 1717; died in office on 6 June 1745.
1745	1758	Robert Clayton	Translated from Cork and Ross; nominated on 3 August 1745 and appointed by letters patent on 26 August 1745; died in office on 26 February 1758.
1758	1782	John Garnett	Translated from Ferns and Leighlin; nominated on 14 March 1758 and appointed by letters patent on 4 April 1758; died in office on 1 March 1782.
1782	1795	John Hotham	Translated from Ossory; nominated on 11 April 1782 and appointed by letters patent on 17 May 1782; also succeeded as 9th Baronet Hotham of Scorborough on 25 January 1794; died in office on 3 November 1795.
1796	1797	William Foster	Translated from Kilmore; nominated on 26 December 1795 and appointed by letters patent on 21 January 1796; died in office before 4 November 1797.
1797	1819	John Porter	Translated to Killala and Achonry; nominated on 18 December 1797 and appointed by letters on 30 December 1797; died in office on 27 July 1819.
1819	1820	The Lord John Beresford	Translated from Raphoe; nominated on 29 August 1819 and appointed by letters patent on 25 September 1819; translated to Dublin & Glendalough on 21 April 1820
1820	1822	The Hon Percy Jocelyn	Translated from Ferns and Leighlin; nominated and appointed by letters patent on 3 April 1820; deprived of the see on 21 October 1822; died on 2 December 1843.
1822	1850	The Lord Robert Tottenham	Translated from Ferns and Leighlin; nominated on 26 November 1822 and appointed by letters patent on 21 December 1822; died in office on 28 April 1850.
1850	1886	During this period the Diocese of Clogher was united to the Diocese of Armagh.	
1886	1902	Charles Stack	Elected on 4 June 1886 and consecrated on 29 June 1886; resigned on 31 December 1902; died on 9 January 1914.
1903	1907	Charles D'Arcy	Elected on 21 January and consecrated on 24 February 1903; translated to Ossory, Ferns and Leighlin on 6 November 1907.
1908	1923	Maurice Day	Elected on 19 December 1907 and consecrated 25 January 1908; died in office on 27 May 1923.
1923	1943	James MacManaway	Elected on 9 November and consecrated on 6 August 1923; resigned on 30 September 1943; died on 29 November 1947.
1944	1958	Richard Tyner	Elected on 9 November 1943 and consecrated on 6 January 1944; died in office on 6 April 1958.
1958	1969	Alan Buchanan	Elected on 17 June and consecrated on 29 September 1958; translated to Dublin & Glendalough on 22 November 1969.
1970	1973	Richard Hanson	Elected on 9 December 1969 and consecrated on 17 March 1970; resigned on 31 March 1973.
1973	1980	Robert Heavener	Elected on 4 May and consecrated on 29 June 1973; retired on 31 May 1980; died on 8 March 2005.
1980	1986	Gordon McMullan	Elected on 13 June and consecrated on 7 September 1980; translated to Down and Dromore in 1986.
1986	2001	Brian Hannon	Elected and consecrated in 1986; retired on 5 October 2001.
2002	2011	Michael Jackson	Elected on 21 November 2001 and consecrated on 6 March 2002; translated to Dublin & Glendalough on 8 May 2011
2011	2020	John McDowell	Appointed by the House of Bishops on 30 May 2011 and consecrated on 23 September 2011. Translated to Armagh on 28 April 2020.
2021	present	Ian Ellis	Elected by the House of Bishops on 9 November 2020 and consecrated on 26 April 2021.

=== Roman Catholic succession ===
Roman Catholic Bishops of Clogher
From	Until	Incumbent	Notes
1546	c.1560	Raymund MacMahon	Appointed on 27 August 1546; died in office.
1560	c. 1592	Cornelius MacArdel	Appointed on 29 May 1560; died in office.
1592	1609	See vacant	
1609	1611	Eugene Matthews	Appointed on 31 August 1609; translated to Dublin on 2 May 1611.
1611	1622	See vacant	
1622	unknown	Patrick Quinn (vicar apostolic)	Appointed vicar apostolic to administer the see by papal brief on 30 July 1622.
1627	1642	Heber MacMahon (vicar apostolic)	Appointed vicar apostolic to administer the see by papal brief on 17 November 1627; translated to Down and Connor on 10 March 1642.
1642	1643	See vacant	
1643	1650	Heber MacMahon (again)	Translated from Down and Connor on 27 June 1643; died in office on 17 July 1650.
1651	unknown	Philip Crolly (vicar apostolic)	Appointed vicar apostolic to administer the see by papal brief on 15 November 1651 and re-appointed on 17 April 1657.
1671	1675	Patrick Duffy OFM	Appointed on 26 May 1671; died in office on 1 August 1675.
1676	1689	Patrick Tyrrell OFM	Appointed on 13 May 1676; also became apostolic administrator of Kilmore 1678–1689; translated to Meath on 24 January 1689.
1689	1707	See vacant	
1707	1715	Hugh MacMahon	Appointed on 15 March 1707; translated to Armagh on 5 July 1715.
1715	1727	See vacant	
1727	1737	Bernard MacMahon	Appointed on 7 April 1727; translated to Armagh on 8 November 1737.
1738	1747	Ross MacMahon	Appointed on 17 May 1738; translated to Armagh on 3 August 1747.
1747	1778	Daniel O'Reilly	Appointed on 11 September 1747; died in office on 24 March 1778.
1778	1801	Hugh O'Reilly	Previously appointed coadjutor bishop on 16 May 1777; succeeded diocesan bishop on 24 March 1778; died on 3 November 1801.
1801	1824	James Murphy	Previously appointed coadjutor bishop in May 1798; succeeded diocesan bishop on 3 November 1801; died in office on 19 November 1824.
1824	1844	Edward Kernan	Previously appointed coadjutor bishop on 18 August 1816 and consecrated on 11 (or 12) April 1818; succeeded diocesan bishop on 19 November 1824; died in office on 20 February 1844.
1844	1864	Charles McNally	Previously appointed coadjutor bishop on 21 July 1843 and consecrated on 5 November 1843; succeeded diocesan bishop on 20 February 1844; died in office on 20 November 1864.
1864	1893	James Donnelly	Appointed on 11 December 1864 and consecrated on 26 February 1865; died in office on 29 December 1893.
1894	1909	Richard Owens	Appointed on 6 July 1894 and consecrated on 26 August 1894; died in office on 3 March 1909
1909	1942	Patrick McKenna	Appointed on 12 June 1909 and consecrated on 10 October 1909; died in office on 7 February 1942.
1943	1969	Eugene O'Callaghan	Appointed on 17 February 1943 and consecrated on 4 April 1943; resigned 3 December 1969; died in office on 21 May 1973.
1969	1979	Patrick Mulligan	Appointed on 3 December 1969 and consecrated on 18 January 1870; resigned on 3 September 1979; died on 21 January 1991.
1979	2010	Joseph Duffy	Appointed on 7 July 1979 and consecrated on 2 September 1979; resigned on 6 May 2010.
2010	2016	Liam MacDaid	Appointed on 6 May 2010 and consecrated on 25 July 2010; resigned on 1 October 2016.
2016	2018	Sede vacante	
2018		Lawrence Duffy	Appointed on 8 December 2018 and consecrated on 10 February 2019.

== See also ==
- Diocese of Clogher (Church of Ireland)
- Roman Catholic Diocese of Clogher
