= John Brinkley (astronomer) =

Irish bishop and astronomer (1763–1835)

The Reverend John Brinkley FRSE
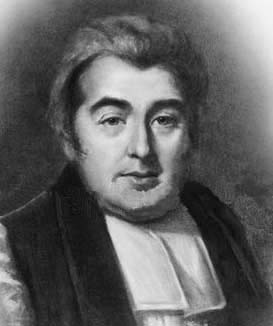
- Born: 1763; Woodbridge, Suffolk, England
- Died: 14 September 1835 (aged 71–72); Dublin, Ireland
- Education: University of Cambridge (BA, MA)
- Known for: Research works on astronomy and stellar formations
- Awards: Copley Medal (1824); Cunningham Medal (1818)
- Honours: Fellow of the Royal Society of Edinburgh (FRSE)
- Scientific career
- Fields: Astronomy
- Workplaces: Trinity College Dublin

John Mortimer Brinkley FRSE (1763 – 14 September 1835) was the first Royal Astronomer of Ireland and later Bishop of Cloyne. He was the President of the Royal Irish Academy (1822–35), the President of the Royal Astronomical Society (1831–33), and in 1792, he became the second Andrews Professor of Astronomy at Trinity College Dublin. Brinkley received the Cunningham Medal in 1818, and the Copley Medal in 1824.

== Early years ==
Brinkley was born in Woodbridge, Suffolk and was baptised there on 31 January 1763, the illegitimate son of Sarah Brinkley, a butcher's daughter.

On being admitted to Cambridge, he was recorded as being the son of John Toler Brinkley, a vintner, but it is strongly suggested that his real father was John Toler, 1st Earl of Norbury, Chief Justice of the Irish Court of Common Pleas.

His exact date of birth is unknown; he has often been assigned the birth year 1763, as at least one obituary gives his age at death in 1835 as 72. However, his memorial at Trinity College Dublin states that he died aged 70; also, he was recorded as being 17 upon matriculation at Gonville and Caius College, Cambridge in August 1783, both of which imply a slightly later birth year.

== Career ==
=== Scientific ===
He graduated Bachelor of Arts (BA) in 1788 as Senior Wrangler and Smith's Prizeman, was elected a fellow of the college and was awarded Cambridge Master of Arts (MA Cantab) in 1791. He was ordained at Lincoln Cathedral in the same year.

In 1792 he became the second Andrews Professor of Astronomy at Trinity College Dublin, which carried the new title of Royal Astronomer of Ireland. He was the director at the Dunsink Observatory from 1790 to 1827. Together with John Law, Bishop of Elphin, he drafted the chapter on "Astronomy" in William Paley's Natural Theology. His main work concerned stellar astronomy and he published his Elements of Plane Astronomy in 1808.

In 1818 he was awarded the prestigious Cunningham Medal of the Royal Irish Academy and in 1822 was elected a Foreign Honorary Member of the American Academy of Arts and Sciences. He was awarded the Copley Medal by the Royal Society in 1824.

Brinkley's observations that several stars shifted their apparent place in the sky in the course of a year - interpreted as evidence of Stellar parallax - were disproved at Greenwich by his contemporary John Pond, the Astronomer Royal. In 1826, he was appointed Bishop of Cloyne in County Cork, a position he held for the remaining nine years of his life. Brinkley was elected President of the Royal Astronomical Society in 1831, serving in that position for two years.

He was also an honorary Fellow of the Royal Society of Edinburgh (HFRSE).

=== Clerical ===
On May 24 May 1806 he was appointed a prebendary of Elphin Cathedral; and on 5 June 1806 he became Rector of Derrybrusk. Later that year Trinity College Dublin awarded him the degree of Doctor of Divinity. He was appointed the Archdeacon of Clogher in 1808; and collated to the Vicarage of Laracor. He was appointed bishop of Cloyne in 1836, and there is a memorial to him in Cloyne Cathedral.

== Family ==
Brinkley married Esther, daughter of Matthew Weld of Molesworth Street, Sheriff of Dublin City, by his wife Elizabeth Kane, daughter of Nathaniel Kane (d. 1757) of Drumreaske, County Monaghan; Sheriff (1720) and Lord Mayor of Dublin (1734); co-founder of the Bank of Kane & Latouche. Brinkley and his wife were the parents of two sons and a daughter: John (1793–1847), Rector of Glanworth, Diocese of Cloyne, who married Anna, second daughter and co-heir of Walter Stephens, of Hybla, County Kildare; Sarah Jane (1801–1827), second wife of Dr. Robert Graves, who died giving birth to a daughter; and Matthew (1797–1855) J.P., of Parsonstown House, County Meath, who married Harriet, a daughter of Richard Graves and with her was the father of Francis Brinkley.

== Death ==
Brinkley died in 1835 at Leeson Street, Dublin and was buried in Trinity College chapel. He was succeeded at Dunsink Observatory by William Rowan Hamilton.

== Arms ==
Coat of arms of John Brinkley

Notes
Posthumously confirmed 14 August 1854 by Sir John Bernard Burke, Ulster King of Arms.
Crest
A cross potence ingrailed surmounted by an estoile all Or.
Escutcheon
Azure a cross potence ingrailed and in chief three estoiles Or.
Motto
Mutabimur

Academic offices
Preceded by John Pond	Copley Medallist at the University of Cambridge; 1825	Succeeded by François Arago / Peter Barlow
Preceded by Andrew Allen	Archdeacon of Clogher; 1808–1825	Succeeded by John Russell
Preceded by Charles Warburton	Bishop of Cloyne; 1826–1835	Succeeded by Samuel Kyle; Bishop of Cork, Cloyne and Ross
