= Tyner =

Tyner may refer to:

== Places ==
In the United States:

- Tyner, Indiana
- Tyner, Kentucky
- Tyner, a hamlet near the east town line of Smithville, New York on County Road 3, east of Smithville Center
- Tyner, North Carolina
- Tyner, Tennessee, a populated place in Hamilton County, Tennessee
- Tyner, West Virginia

== People ==
- Charles Tyner (1925–2017), American actor
- Tyner Rushing, American actress
- Chuck Tyner, former goalie for the Toronto Professional Hockey Club
- James Noble Tyner (1826–1904), postmaster general from 1876 to 1877
- Jarvis Tyner (born 1941), executive vice chair of the Communist Party USA
- Jason Tyner (born 1977), Major League Baseball outfielder
- John Tyner, former guitarist for Mk Ultra
- John Tyner, software engineer and blogger known for refusing to cave in to TSA demands
- Lanardo Tyner (born 1975), American boxer
- Matt Tyner (born 1958), American baseball player and coach
- McCoy Tyner (1938–2020), American jazz pianist
- Mitch Tyner, trial lawyer and candidate in the Mississippi gubernatorial election, 2003
- Richard Tyner (1877–1958), Anglican bishop
- Rob Tyner (1944–1991), lead singer for the American hard rock band MC5
- Roy Tyner (1934–1989), NASCAR driver
- Rudolph Tyner, death row inmate killed by Donald Henry Gaskins
- Scott Tyner (born 1972), former NFL punter for the Atlanta Falcons
- Thomas Tyner (born 1994), American college football player
- William Tyner (1872–1954), Australian politician

== Other ==
- Tyner Academy, a school in Chattanooga, Tennessee
