= John Brinkley =

John Brinkley may refer to:

- John Brinkley (astronomer) (1763–1835), Astronomer Royal of Ireland and Bishop of Cloyne
- John R. Brinkley (1885–1942), American doctor known for his radio broadcasts and accusations of quackery
