= Adam White (Medal of Honor) =

Swiss-born Union soldier (1823–1895)

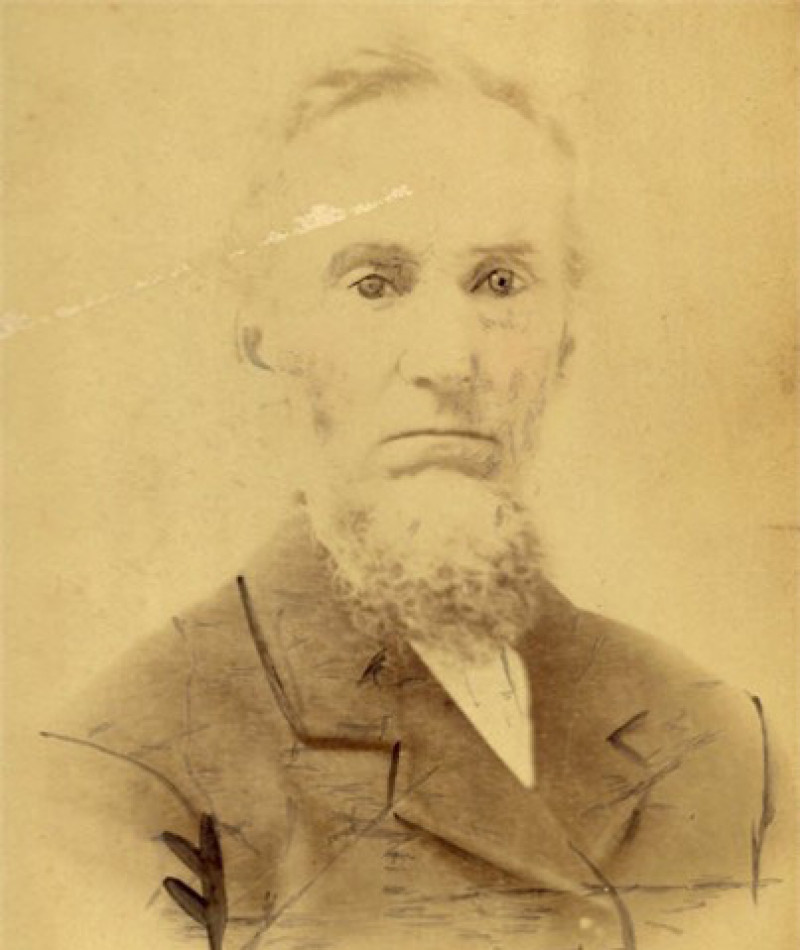
- Born: 21 December 1823; Switzerland
- Died: 19 May 1895 (aged 71); Tyner, West Virginia, US
- Resting place: Wadesville Cemetery; Wood County, West Virginia, US
- Military career
- Branch: United States Army
- Rank: Corporal
- Unit: 11th West Virginia; Infantry Regiment
- Conflict: American Civil War
- Awards: Medal of Honor

Adam White (21 December 1823 – 19 May 1895) was a Swiss-born American soldier who received the Medal of Honor for his actions during the American Civil War.

Born in Switzerland on 21 December 1823, Adam White was a corporal in the United States Army during the American Civil War. While assigned to the 11th West Virginia Infantry Regiment, for his actions on 2 April 1865 at Hatcher's Run in Virginia, White was awarded the Medal of Honor on 13 June 1865. His citation therefor reads:

The President of the United States of America, in the name of Congress, takes pleasure in presenting the Medal of Honor to Corporal Adam White, United States Army, for extraordinary heroism on 2 April 1865, while serving with Company G, 11th West Virginia Infantry, in action at Hatcher's Run, Virginia, for capture of flag.

White died on 19 May 1895 in Tyner, West Virginia. He was buried in the Wadesville Cemetery in Wood County, West Virginia.
