= Art Mac Cathmhaoil =

Irish bishop

Art Mac Cathmhaoil (Sometimes Anglicised to Arthur MacCawell) was a priest in Ireland during the late 14th and early 15th centuries.

He was Archdeacon of Clogher from 1367 to 1389; and Bishop of Clogher from then until his death on 10 August 1432.
