= Heber MacMahon =

Irish bishop (1600–1650)

- Bishop of Clogher
- Church: Roman Catholic Church
- See: Clogher
- In office: 1643–1650
- Predecessor: Eugene Matthews
- Successor: Patrick Duffy
- Previous post: Bishop of Down and Connor

Personal details
- Born: 1600 Inniskeen
- Died: July or September 1650

Heber MacMahon (Irish Éimhear Mac Mathúna) (1600 – 1650) was bishop of Clogher and general in Ulster. He was educated at the Irish college, Douay, and at Louvain, and ordained a Roman Catholic priest 1625. He became bishop of Clogher in 1643 and a leader among the confederate Catholics. As a general of the Ulster army, he fought Oliver Cromwell at the Battle of Scarrifholis in 1650. He was defeated, taken prisoner and executed the same year.

== Biography ==
MacMahon was born in 1600 on the island of Inniskeen in what is now County Monaghan. He received his early education at the Franciscan Monastery in Kiltybegs, Monaghan. He went to the Irish College at Douai in 1617 and later to Leuven. He was ordained a priest in 1625 and appointed as Vicar apostolic of the Diocese of Clogher by a papal brief on 17 November 1627. Fifteen years later, he was appointed Bishop of Down and Connor on 10 March 1642. He played a prominent part in the Irish Catholic Confederation in Kilkenny.

He was appointed Bishop of Clogher in June 1643. He worked closely with Owen Roe O'Neill throughout the 1640s and liaised with Giovanni Battista Rinuccini after his arrival in 1645. Following the mysterious death of Owen Roe O'Neill on 6 November 1649, the leadership of the Ulster army of 5,000 foot soldiers and 600 cavalry was entrusted to Bishop McMahon by the Earl of Ormonde. In 1650 McMahon took Dungiven and massacred the Protestant inhabitants, but the Irish forces were then routed by Cromwell’s army at the battle of Scarrifholis, near Letterkenny, in June of that same year. Although he escaped, he was captured, hanged and beheaded by Sir Charles Coote in Enniskillen. He died in office in July or 17 September 1650.

After his death, Philip Crolly was appointed vicar apostolic to administer the diocese of Clogher in 1651, and the next bishop was Patrick Duffy who was appointed in 1671.

== See also ==
- Roman Catholic Diocese of Clogher

== Notes ==
Catholic Church titles
Preceded by Eugene Matthews (1609–1611); Patrick Quinn (vicar apostolic, appointed 1622)	Bishop of Clogher; 1643–1650 (vicar apostolic, 1627–1642)	Succeeded by Philip Crolly (vicar apostolic, appointed 1651); Patrick Duffy (1671–1675)
