= James MacManaway =

James MacManaway may refer to:

- James MacManaway (bishop) (1860–1947), Church of Ireland Bishop of Clogher
- J. G. MacManaway (1898–1951), Church of Ireland clergyman and Ulster Unionist politician, son of the above
