= Michael Mac an tSáir =

13th century Irish bishop

Michael Mac an tSáir was a bishop in Ireland during the 13th-century.

Mac an tSáir was imposed as Bishop of Clogher by the Archbishop of Armagh Máel Patraic Ua Scannail, although the Chapter had elected Reginald MacGilla Finin. He was consecrated on 9 September 1268 and served until his death in 1285.
