= MacManaway =

MacManaway and McManaway are similar surnames. Notable people with these two names include:

- Hugh MacManaway (born 19th century), Dean of Clogher, Northern Ireland
- James MacManaway (bishop) (1860–1947), Irish Anglican bishop
- J. G. MacManaway (1898–1951), British Unionist politician and cleric
- Milton McManaway (1901–1946), American college football player
