= Daniel O'Reilly =

Daniel O'Reilly may refer to:

- Daniel O'Reilly (bishop) (1700–1778), Roman Catholic Bishop of Clogher in Ireland
- Daniel O'Reilly (comedian) (born 1984) Comedian, actor, social media content creator.
- Daniel O'Reilly (footballer) (born 1995), Irish soccer player
- Daniel O'Reilly (politician) (1838–1911), Irish-born U.S. Representative from New York, 1879-81
- Danny O'Reilly, Irish musician, lead singer of The Coronas
