= Nicolaus Mac Cathasaigh =

Priest and bishop in Ireland (died 1356)

Nicolaus Mac Cathasaigh was a priest in Ireland during the 14th century.

The Archdeacon of Clogher, in 1320 he became Bishop of Clogher. He died in 1356.
