= Florence Woolley =

Irish bishop

Florence Woolley, OSB was a priest in England and Ireland in the 15th-century.

He was appointed Bishop of Clogher on 20 November 1475, apparently on the false news of Rossa mac Tomáis Óig Mág Uidhir's resignation. He did not, however gain possession of the see. He acted as a suffragan bishop in the Diocese of Norwich from 1478 until his death in 1500.
