= Brian Mac Cathmhaoil =

14th century Irish priest

Brian Mac Cathmhaoi was a priest in Ireland during the mid 14th century.

The Archdeacon of Clogher, in 1356 he became Bishop of Clogher. He died of the plague in 1361
