= Hugh O'Reilly =

Hugh O'Reilly may refer to:

- Hugh O'Reilly (archbishop of Armagh) (c. 1581–1653), Irish Catholic bishop
- Hugh O'Reilly (bishop of Clogher) (1739–1801), Irish Catholic bishop
- Hughie O'Reilly, Gaelic football player
