= Pádraig Ó Cuilín =

Irish bishop

Pádraig Ó Cuilín, OESA was Bishop of Clogher from his appointment in 1517 until his death in 1534: with his archdeacon, Roderic Cassidy, he made the first written record of his diocese.
