= Roderic Cassidy =

Roderic Cassidy was an Anglican Archdeacon in Ireland in the 16th century.

Cassidy was a philosopher and assisted his bishop, Pádraig Ó Cuilín, in making a record of the Diocese of Clogher He was Archdeacon of Clogher from 1525 until his death in 1541.
