= Alan Buchanan (bishop) =

Irish Anglican bishop

The Right Reverend Alan Buchanan D.D.
- Archbishop of Dublin; Primate of Ireland
- Church: Church of Ireland
- Diocese: Dublin and Glendalough
- Elected: 10 September 1969
- In office: 1969–1977
- Predecessor: George Simms
- Successor: Henry McAdoo
- Previous post: Bishop of Clogher (1958–1969)

Orders
- Ordination: 1931
- Consecration: 29 September 1958 by John Gregg

Personal details
- Born: 28 February 1905 Fintona, County Tyrone, Northern Ireland
- Died: 4 February 1984 (aged 78) Dublin, County Dublin, Republic of Ireland
- Buried: Fintona, County Tyrone
- Denomination: Anglican
- Spouse: Audrey Kathryn Crone
- Children: 2

Alan Alexander Buchanan (28 February 1905 – 4 February 1984) was an Anglican bishop in the second half of the 20th century.

== Biography ==
Buchanan was born in Fintona. Educated at Masonic Boys School and Trinity College Dublin, where he graduated in history and political science in 1928. He was ordained in 1931. He served as a chaplain with military forces during the Second World War, notably parachuting into Arnhem in 1944 and being captured by the Germans. In the Airborne Museum at Oosterbeek there is a serviceman's prayer card displayed which is signed by Buchanan.

He was with the Church of Ireland Mission in Belfast until 1937, after which he held incumbencies at St Cedma Inver and St Mary, Belfast and St Comgall, Bangor. He was Bishop of Clogher from 1958 to 1969, when he became Archbishop of Dublin and Primate of Ireland. He resigned in 1977 and died on 4 February 1984.

Among other things, Buchanan was known as an advocate for women's ministry. In the early 1970s, he spoke to the Diocesan Synod of Dublin: "Is it right to limits the possibility of ordination to one half of the Church? Our House of Bishops has recently echoed the view of Lambeth that there is no theological reason against the ordination of women. The Church in Canada has already decided in favour... the Church of Ireland should at least declare its mind on the subject." He personally invited and trained the first five women to be commissioned Lay Readers in the Church of Ireland in 1975, including Daphne Wormell and Patricia Hastings-Hardy. When the group chose a maroon liturgical gown, which looks similar to the bishops' red, he told them, "If they like to think I am commissioning five lady bishops, let them think it!"

His daughter, Désirée Stedman, was ordained in the Anglican Church of Canada. She was accepted into training in 1982 before the Church of Ireland voted to ordain women as deacons in 1984, and as priests and bishops in 1990. Buchanan missed these developments, having died on 4 February 1984.

Anglican Communion titles
Preceded by Richard Tyner	Bishop of Clogher; 1958–1969	Succeeded by Richard Hanson
Preceded by George Simms	Archbishop of Dublin; 1969–1977	Succeeded by Henry McAdoo
