= Matthaeus Mac Cathasaigh =

Irish priest

Matthaeus Mac Cathasaigh (some sources Matthew MacCathasaid) was a priest in Ireland during the 14th century.

He was Archdeacon of Clogher from 1356 to 1361 when he became Bishop of Clogher.
