= Ross MacMahon =

Catholic bishop (1698-1748)

The Most Reverend Ross Roe MacMahon
- Archbishop of Armagh, Primate of All-Ireland
- Church: Roman Catholic Church
- See: Armagh
- In office: 1747 — 1748
- Predecessor: Bernard MacMahon
- Successor: Michael O'Reilly
- Previous posts: Bishop of Clogher (1737–1747)

Personal details
- Born: 1698 Enagh, County Monaghan
- Died: 29 October 1748 (aged 49–50)

Ross Roe MacMahon (born 1698 in Enagh, County Monaghan) was ordained to the priesthood in 1727. He was appointed as Roman Catholic Bishop of Clogher on 8 November 1738 following the appointment of his predecessor, Bernard MacMahon, to the see of Armagh on 8 November 1737. Bishop MacMahon was himself appointed to the same see on 3 August 1747; he died in Armagh on 29 October 1748. Bishop MacMahon served as Bishop of Clogher for just under nine years.

== See also ==
- Roman Catholic Diocese of Clogher

Catholic Church titles
Preceded by Bernard MacMahon	Bishop of Clogher; 1738 – 1747	Succeeded by Michael O'Reilly
Preceded by Bernard MacMahon	Archbishop of Armagh; 1747 – 1748	Succeeded by Daniel O’Reilly
