= Giolla Pádraig Ó Connálaigh =

Irish religious figure

Pádraig Ó Cuilín (Sometimes Anglicised to Patrick O'Conally), Abbot of Clones, was Bishop of Clogher from his appointment in 1504 until his death in 1505.
