= Edward Kernan =

Irish priest in the Diocese of Clogher

- Bishop of Clogher
- Church: Catholic Church
- See: Clogher
- In office: 19 November 1824 – 20 February 1844
- Predecessor: Bishop James Murphy
- Successor: Bishop Charles McNally

Personal details
- Born: 1771 Enniskillen, County Fermanagh
- Died: 20 February 1844 (aged 72–73)

Edward Kernan (born 1771 in Enniskillen, County Fermanagh, Ireland) was an Irish priest in the Diocese of Clogher ordained in 1795. He was educated at Portora Royal School, and studied for the priesthood in the Irish College in Salamanca, Spain after his ordination as was the custom of the time.

He returned to Ireland in 1798 and was appointed pastor of his native town and was a popular priest and effective pastor.

== Bishop ==
Kernan was appointed the Coadjutor Bishop of the Diocese of Clogher on 18 August 1816 and was ordained on 12 April 1818. He became bishop of the diocese on 19 November 1824, following the death of his predecessor, Dr James Murphy.

Under his episcopal leadership St Macartan's College was founded and in his will Bishop Kernan left five hundred pound to allow the College to develop.

He died in office on 20 February 1844 having served as bishop of his diocese for almost twenty years. Dr Kernan was succeeded by Bishop Charles McNally, who had been appointed his Coadjutor Bishop in September 1843. He was buried in the family plot in Carrickmacross.

== See also ==
- Roman Catholic Diocese of Clogher

Catholic Church titles
Preceded by Saint Gabriel-Taurin Dufresse, M.E.P.	— TITULAR — Bishop of Thabraca; 1818–1824	Succeeded by Rémi Gaulin
Preceded by Bishop James Murphy	Bishop of Clogher; 1824–1844	Succeeded by Bishop Charles McNally
