= Hugh O'Carolan =

Irish bishop

Hugh O'Carolan (in some sources O'Cervallan) was Bishop of Clogher from 1537 to 1557.

The Rector of Donaghmore, he was appointed by Pope Paul III on 6 August 1535 and consecrated in January 1537. On 1 October 1542, O'Carolan renounced his papal appointment, and was re-appointed by King Henry VIII.
