= James Heygate =

Irish Anglican bishop

James Heygate, a Glaswegian, was an Anglican bishop in Ireland during the first half of the Seventeenth century.

Formerly Archdeacon of Clogher, he was consecrated Bishop of Kilfenora on 30 May 1630; and served until his death on 30 April 1638.
