= Christian of Clogher =

Irish saint and bishop

Saint Christian

Bishop of Clogher
- Born: Armagh, Ireland
- Died: 12 June 1138; Clogher, Ireland
- Venerated in: Roman Catholic Church
- Feast: 12 June

Christian, also known as Gilla Críst Ua Morgair (Modern Irish: Croistan Ó Morgair), was a bishop and brother of St. Malachy of Armagh. In 1126, Christian was named the Bishop of Clogher, in Ireland, a position he held until his death on 12 June 1138. He was buried at the Abbey of St. Peter and Paul in Armagh.

== Visio Tnugdali ==
The Visio Tnugdali, written c. 1149, makes reference to Christian as follows:

When Saint Ruadan had fallen silent, Tundale looked happily about him and saw Saint Patrick of Ireland, dressed in shining robes alongside many bishops decked out in their finest regalia. They were all joyful and there was no sound of any sighing! Among that blessed company Tundale could see four bishops whom he recognised... The third bishop that Tundale recognised was Malachias O'Moore's brother, the former bishop of Clogher, a wealthy but a retiring man.
