= Bernard MacMahon (bishop) =

Catholic archbishop

- Archbishop of Armagh
- Church: Roman Catholic Church
- See: Armagh
- In office: 1737 – 1747
- Predecessor: Hugh MacMahon
- Successor: Ross Roe MacMahon
- Previous post(s): Bishop of Clogher (1727–1737)

Personal details
- Born: 1680; Enagh, County Monaghan
- Died: May 27, 1747 (aged 66–67); Armagh

Dr. Bernard MacMahon (1680–27 May 1747) was Bishop of Clogher 1727–1737 and Archbishop of Armagh 1738–1747.

MacMahon was appointed as Roman Catholic Bishop of Clogher on 17 August 1727, following the death of his predecessor, Hugh MacMahon. Bernard MacMahon was transferred to the position of Archbishop of Armagh on 8 November 1737. In 1741, he would go into hiding as a result of him not promoting a priest to a parish; this would result in a warrant being issued for his arrest. He died in Armagh on 27 May 1747.

== See also ==
- Roman Catholic Diocese of Clogher

Catholic Church titles
Preceded by Hugh MacMahon	Bishop of Clogher; 1727 – 1737	Succeeded by Ross Roe MacMahon
Preceded by Hugh MacMahon	Archbishop of Armagh; 1737 – 1747	Succeeded by Ross Roe MacMahon
