= Raymund MacMahon =

Irish bishop

- Bishop of Clogher
- Church: Catholic Church
- See: Clogher
- In office: 1546 – 1560

Raymund MacMahon was Bishop of Clogher from his appointment on 27 August 1546 until his death in 1566.

== See also ==
- Roman Catholic Diocese of Clogher
