= Dominic Maguire (bishop) =

Irish prelate

The Most Reverend Dominic Maguire OP
- Archbishop of Armagh; Primate of All Ireland
- Church: Roman Catholic
- Appointed: 12 January 1684
- Term ended: 21 September 1707
- Predecessor: Oliver Plunkett
- Successor: Hugh MacMahon

Personal details
- Died: 21 September 1707

Dominic Maguire OP (died 21 September 1707) was an Irish prelate of the Roman Catholic Church. A leading Jacobite in Ireland, he served as the Archbishop of Armagh and Primate of All Ireland from 1683 to 1707.

== Biography ==
Maguire was likely educated at the Dominican houses in County Londonderry, becoming a Dominican friar. He finished his education in Andalusia, before becoming an honorary chaplain to the Spanish ambassador in London. He lived there until he was elected Archbishop of Armagh by the Sacred Congregation for the Propagation of the Faith on 14 December 1683. This elevation was likely due to the influence of James, Duke of York. By a papal brief, dated 12 January 1684, he was empowered to perform archiepiscopal functions without the Pallium. Upon the accession of James II in 1685, Maguire travelled to London with Patrick Tyrrell to pledge loyalty to the new king. In May 1686 Maguire was back in Ireland, presiding over a meeting of eleven bishops in Dublin, which admitted the primacy of the see of Armagh. In January 1687, James II named Maguire as chaplain general to the army and authorised him to approve regimental chaplains.

During the Williamite War in Ireland, Maguire and other Catholic prelates were instrumental in saving from destruction the valuable library of Trinity College Dublin. In August 1691, Maguire went to France to discuss the acute military situation with James II. His negotiations with the king encouraged him to convince the Irish Jacobites defenders of Limerick to hold out for much more favourable terms than those which had already been offered by the Williamites. He was among those who discussed the final terms of the surrender of Limerick with General Ginkel. He was also present during the discussion of the civil articles of the Treaty of Limerick.

Later in 1691, Maguire fled to France, and took refuge at the exiled Jacobite court at Château de Saint-Germain-en-Laye. In February and December 1692 he wrote to Pope Innocent XI requesting financial assistance. In 1700 he visited Rome and was received by Pope Innocent XII. Through the intercession of Mary of Modena, Maguire secured a pension from Louis XIV, and lived in exile in Paris for the rest of his life. He died on 21 September 1707, and was buried in the crypt the church of the Collège des Lombards which was part of the Irish College in Paris.

== Bibliography ==
- Brady, W. Maziere (1876). The Episcopal Succession in England, Scotland and Ireland, A.D. 1400 to 1875. Vol. 1. Rome: Tipografia Della Pace.
- Fryde, E. B.; Greenway, D. E.; Porter, S.; Roy, I., eds. (1986). Handbook of British Chronology (3rd, reprinted 2003 ed.). Cambridge: Cambridge University Press. ISBN 0-521-56350-X.

Catholic Church titles
Preceded by Oliver Plunkett	Archbishop of Armagh and Primate of All Ireland; 1683–1707	Vacant Title next held by Hugh MacMahon
