= Gilla Tigernaig Mac Gilla Rónáin =

Irish bishop

Gilla Tigernaig Mac Gilla Rónáin, an Augustinian, was a bishop in Ireland during the 13th century: He was Bishop of Clogher until his death in 1218.
