= Gilla Críst Ua Mucaráin =

12th century Irish bishop

Gilla Críst Ua Mucaráin was a bishop in Ireland during the 12th century: he was Bishop of Louth from 1187 until his death in 1191.
