= Cináeth Ua Baígill =

12th century bishop in Ireland

Cináeth Ua Baígill was a bishop in Ireland during the 12th century: he was Bishop of Clogher until his death in1135.
