= Matthaeus Mac Cathasaig =

Irish bishop during the late 13th century

Matthaeus Mac Cathasaig was a bishop in Ireland during the late 13th and early 14th centuries.

The chancellor of Armagh, he was consecrated bishop of Clogher in Lisgoole Abbey on 29 June 1287 and served until his death in 1310.
