= Patrick Tyrrell =

Irish prelate

Patrick Tyrrell O.F.M.
- Bishop of Meath
- Church: Catholic Church
- Diocese: Diocese of Meath
- In office: 24 January 1689 – October 1692
- Predecessor: James Cusack
- Successor: James Fagan
- Previous posts: Vicar Apostolic of Kilmore (1678-1689); Bishop of Clogher (1676-1689)

Orders
- Consecration: 14 June 1676

Personal details
- Born: 1627 Fertullagh (southwest of Tyrrellspass), County Westmeath, Kingdom of Ireland, English Empire
- Died: October 1692 (aged 64–65) Limerick, County Limerick, Kingdom of Ireland, English Empire

Styles of Patrick Tyrrell, O.F.M.
- Reference style: The Most Reverend
- Spoken style: My Lord
- Religious style: Bishop

Patrick Tyrrell (or Tyrell), O.F.M. (died 1692) was an Irish prelate of the Roman Catholic Church who served as the Bishop of Clogher (1676–1689), Vicar Apostolic of Kilmore (1678–1689), and Bishop of Meath (1689–1692). A prominent Jacobite, he was appointed Chief Secretary for Ireland in 1688.

== Biography ==
A Franciscan friar, Tyrrell was educated in Ireland and the University of Alcalá in Spain. He was ordained in Rome in 1652 or 1653. He undertook further studies at Sant'Isidoro a Capo le Case, Rome before teaching theology in Naples. In 1665 he became vice-secretary-general of the Franciscan Order.

Tyrrell was appointed the Bishop of the Diocese of Clogher by Pope Clement X on 22 April 1676. His papal brief to the See was dated 13 May 1676 and consecrated on 14 June 1676. Tyrrell was also appointed the vicar apostolic of the Diocese of Kilmore by Pope Innocent XI on either 9 February 1678 or 21 March 1678. Tyrrell was forced into hiding on the outbreak of the Popish Plot crisis in autumn 1678. He was arrested and imprisoned, but escaped with the collusion of sympathetic gaolers. On 21 October 1680 he was again arrested and charged with high treason, although he was later acquitted.

Upon the accession of James II of England, Tyrrell travelled to London with Dominic Maguire to pledge loyalty to the new king. He was appointed Chief Secretary for Ireland under the Earl of Tyrconnell from 1688 to 1689. He was translated to the Diocese of Meath on 24 January 1689. Tyrrell is reputed to have said mass with Jacobite soldiers on the morning of the Battle of the Boyne.

Bishop Tyrrell resolved to remain in Ireland following the conclusion of the Williamite War in Ireland, and died in office in 1692.

== Bibliography ==
- Fryde, E. B.; Greenway, D. E.; Porter, S.; Roy, I., eds. (1986). Handbook of British Chronology (3rd, reprinted 2003 ed.). Cambridge: Cambridge University Press. ISBN 0-521-56350-X.
- Moody, T. W.; Martin, F. X.; Byrne, F. J., eds. (1984). Maps, Genealogies, Lists: A Companion to Irish History, Part II. A New History of Ireland. Vol. IX. Oxford: Oxford University Press. ISBN 0-19-821745-5.

Catholic Church titles
Preceded by Patrick Duffy	Bishop of Clogher; 1676–1689	Vacant Title next held by Hugh MacMahon
Vacant Title last held by Eugene Sweeney (bishop)	Vicar Apostolic of Kilmore; 1678–1689	Vacant Title next held by Hugh MacMahon (administrator)
Preceded by James Cusack	Bishop of Meath; 1689–1692	Vacant Title next held by Stephen MacEgan
Political offices
Preceded by Thomas Sheridan	Chief Secretary for Ireland; 1688–1689	Succeeded by John Davis
