= Richard Tyner =

Irish Anglican bishop

Richard Tyner (1 October 1877 – 6 April 1958) was an Irish Anglican bishop.

Richard Styner was born in Castlepollard, County Westmeath, Ireland and educated at Trinity College, Dublin. He was ordained in 1910. He was a curate at St Cyllin Monaghan and then held incumbencies at Clontibret, Ematris and Rockcorry. He was appointed the 52nd Bishop of Clogher in 1943 And served until 1958. He died in Monaghan, aged 80.

Religious titles
Preceded by James MacManaway	Bishop of Clogher; 1943–1958	Succeeded by Alan Alexander Buchanan
