= Donatus Ó Fidabra =

Cool thing

Donatus Ó Fidabra OCist was an archbishop in Ireland during the 13th-century.

The Prior of Louth, he became Bishop of Clogher in 1218. In 1227 he became Archbishop of Armagh. Ó Fidabra died in October 1237.
