= James Murphy (bishop) =

Roman Catholic Bishop of Clogher

- Bishop of Clogher
- Church: Roman Catholic Church
- See: Clogher
- In office: 1801–1824
- Predecessor: Hugh O’Reilly
- Successor: Edward Kernan

Personal details
- Born: 1744; Drumshevra, Scotstown, County Monaghan
- Died: 19 November 1824

James Murphy (1744–1824) was the Roman Catholic Bishop of Clogher from 1801 to 1824.

Born in Drumshevra near Scotstown, County Monaghan, Ireland, he was ordained a Catholic priest in the Diocese of Clogher in 1768. He was appointed the Coadjutor Bishop of the Diocese of Clogher in Ireland in May 1798.

He became the Roman Catholic Bishop of Clogher on 3 November 1801, following the death of his predecessor, Hugh O’Reilly. Murphy died in office on 19 November 1824 having served as bishop of his diocese for almost twenty-three years. He was succeeded by Bishop Edward Kernan, who had was appointed his Coadjutor Bishop on 18 August 1816.

== See also ==
- Roman Catholic Diocese of Clogher

Catholic Church titles
Preceded by Hugh O’Reilly	Bishop of Clogher; 1801 – 1824	Succeeded by Edward Kernan
