= Niall mac Séamuis Mac Mathghamhna =

15th-century priest in Ireland

Niall mac Séamuis Mac Mathghamhna, was a 15th-century priest in Ireland: he was appointed Bishop of Clogher on 14 June 1484, but the papal bulls were not expedited. He died in 1488.
