= Hugh MacMahon =

Irish Catholic bishop (1660-1737)

- Archbishop of Armagh
- Church: Roman Catholic Church
- See: Armagh
- In office: 1715 – 1737
- Predecessor: Dominic Maguire
- Successor: Bernard MacMahon
- Previous posts: Bishop of Clogher (1707–1715)

Personal details
- Born: 1660 Cavany, County Monaghan
- Died: 17 August 1737 (aged 76–77) Armagh

Hugh MacMahon (1660–1737) was Bishop of Clogher 1707–1715 and Archbishop of Armagh 1715–1737.

Born in 1660 in the townland of Cavany, Scotshouse, County Monaghan, Ireland, the son of Colla Dubh Mac Mahon of the Dartry branch of the clan and Eibhlin O'Reilly, the daughter of Colonel Philip O'Reilly, the Cavan leader in the 1641 Rebellion. Hugh MacMahon was appointed as Roman Catholic Bishop of Clogher on 15 March 1707, following the death of his predecessor, Patrick Tyrrell in 1689. In 1711, he was appointed the Apostolic Administrator for the Diocese of Kilmore; he resigned from this position in 1728. On 8 July 1715 he was appointed to the position of Archbishop of Armagh. Hugh MacMahon was the first of three Clogher bishops who were, in succession, appointed to the See of Armagh. He died in Armagh on 7 August 1737.

Bishop MacMahon was one of several priests who were targets for Edward Tyrrell the priest-hunter working in Dublin and the Wicklow area around 1712.

== See also ==
- Roman Catholic Diocese of Clogher

Catholic Church titles
Preceded by Patrick Tyrrell	Bishop of Clogher; 1707 – 1715	Succeeded by Bernard MacMahon
Vacant Title last held by Dominic Maguire	Archbishop of Armagh; 1715 – 1737	Succeeded by Bernard MacMahon
