= Henricus (bishop of Clogher) =

Irish bishop

Henricus was a bishop in Ireland during the early 14th century: he was Bishop of Clogher from 1310 until 1316.
