= Aodh Ó hEóthaigh =

Irish bishop

Aodh Ó hEóthaigh, (sometimes Anglicised as Hugh O'Neill) was a bishop in Ireland during the 14th century: the incumbent at Tamlaght and the Chancellor of Armagh, he was Bishop of Clogher until his death on 27 July 1370.
