= Nehemias Ó Cluainín =

Bishop of clogher

Nehemias Ó CluainínOESA (Sometimes Anglicised to Nehamiah Clonin), was Bishop of Clogher from his appointment in 1502 until his resignation a year later.
