= Philip Crolly =

Roman Catholic priest

Philip Crolly was appointed Vicar Apostolic to administer the See of Clogher, Northern Ireland by Pope Innocent X on 15 November 1651 and re-appointed on 17 April 1657 by Pope Alexander VII.

== See also ==
- Roman Catholic Diocese of Clogher
