= Andrew Allen (priest) =

Irish Anglican priest (died 1808)

Andrew Allen (died 29 September 1808) was a 19th-century Anglo-Irish Anglican priest.

Allen was educated at the University of Glasgow. He was ordained on 13 July 1777. He held livings at Templecarne, Drumcrin, Belleek, Kilmore, Killeevan, Drumsna and Currin. He was appointed Registrar and Vicar general of Clogher in 1784 and Chancellor of Clogher in 1795. He was the Archdeacon of Clogher from 1804 until his death in 1808.
