= Andreas (coadjutor bishop of Clogher) =

Coadjutor Bishop

Andreas was appointed Coadjutor Bishopof Clogher in 1500.
