= Áed Ua Cáellaide =

Irish bishop

Áed Ua Cáellaide (sometimes Anglicised to Edan O'Kelly) was a bishop in Ireland during the 12th century: he was Bishop of Clogher from 1139 to his death on 29 March 1182- for the bulk of his episcopacy he was known as the Bishop of Louth.
