= Patrick Duffy (bishop) =

Catholic bishop in Ireland

Most Reverend Patrick Duffy
- Bishop of Clogher
- Church: Catholic Church
- See: Clogher
- In office: 1673 – 1 August 1675
- Predecessor: Bishop Heber MacMahon
- Successor: Bishop Patrick Tyrrell
- Previous post: unknown

Personal details
- Born: unknown Carrickatee, Co Monaghan

The Most Reverend Patrick Duffy (Irish Pádraig Ó Dubhthaigh) was appointed as Roman Catholic Bishop of Clogher on 12 May 1671, twenty-one years after the death of his predecessor, Heber MacMahon in 1650. A Franciscan, he was installed as bishop in 1673. He died two years later on 1 August 1675.

He was succeeded by Bishop Patrick Tyrrell in 1676. Bishop Duffy served in his position in Clogher for about two years.

According to tradition, he was buried in the graveyard attached to the pre-Reformation church at Clontibret, now the site of the Church of Ireland church. The Duffys were the ruling family of Clontibret and supplied the priests to the local parish for centuries before the end of Gaelic rule in Ulster in the early 17th century.

== See also ==
- Roman Catholic Diocese of Clogher

Preceded by Bishop Heber MacMahon	Bishop of Clogher; 1673 – 1675	Succeeded by Bishop Patrick Tyrrell
