= Cornelius Ó Bánáin =

Irish bishop

Cornelius (some sources Gelasius) Ó Bánáin, Abbot of Clones, was a bishop in Ireland during the early 14th century: he was Bishop of Clogher from 1316 until his death in 1319.
