= James Spottiswood =

Scottish courtier, later Bishop of Clogher

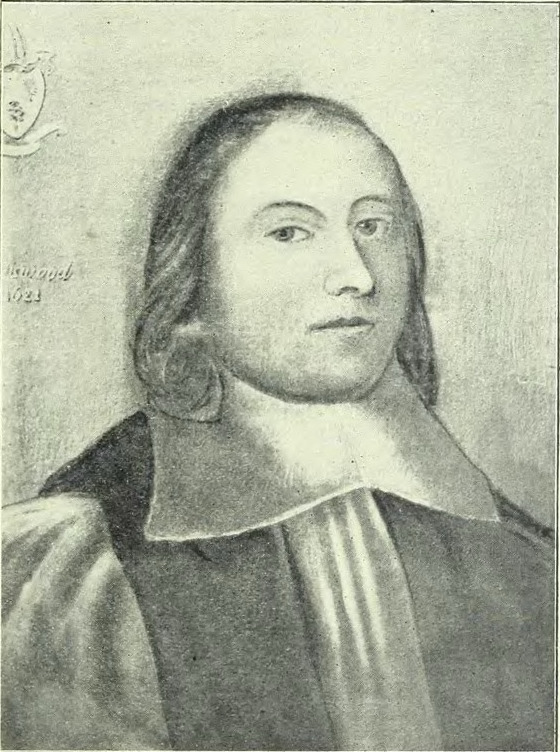
- Born: 1567
- Died: 1645 (aged 77–78)

James Spottiswood (7 September 1567 – March, 1645) was a Scottish courtier and Protestant bishop of Clogher.

== Life ==
Born at Calder in Scotland on 7 September 1567, he was the second son of John Spottiswood (1510–1585), the Presbyterian superintendent for the Lothians and the overstretched minister of Calder. His mother was Beatrix, daughter of Patrick Crichton, of Lugton and Gilmerton. His younger brother John Spottiswood, the historian, became the archbishop of St. Andrews and crowned Charles I. James was educated at home under a tutor, William Strange, and then spent time at Edinburgh grammar school and Linlithgow. In 1579, when just 12 years old, he entered Glasgow University, graduating M.A. in 1583. He spent the next two years in attendance on his father at Calder.

In 1588 Spottiswood entered the service of James VI of Scotland. In October 1589 he accompanied James as his gentleman-usher on his sea voyage to meet his bride Anne of Denmark, and on 27 December 1591 he raised the alarm which saved James from seizure by Francis Stewart, 5th Earl of Bothwell. In 1598 he was sent abroad as secretary to the ambassadors to the king of Denmark and the German princes, and on James's accession to the English throne in 1603 Spottiswood was left behind in Scotland in attendance on Queen Anne.

Early in James's reign in England, Spottiswood was sent with letters to Archbishop John Whitgift, who persuaded him to take orders the Church of England. On 24 November he was granted letters of naturalisation, and in December he was presented by the king to the rectory of Wells, Norfolk. For years Spottiswood avoided the court. In 1616 he accompanied Patrick Young on his visitation to reform the University of St. Andrews, and there he graduated D.D.

In 1620 Spottiswood went to London for a court case. While he was there, George Montgomery died, leaving two Irish sees vacant. Through the Marquess of Buckingham, Spottiswood was appointed bishop of one of them, Clogher, based south-west Ulster, much of it in County Fermanagh. He landed at Dublin in April 1621, but his patent was not dated until 22 October, and he was involved in a dispute with James Ussher.

In his diocese, Spottiswood was involved in a further dispute from 1625, over the schoolmaster at the royal school founded at Enniskillen. He was opposed by James Balfour, 1st Baron Balfour of Glenawley, and the matter came to blows, before the issue was settled in 1627. A complex legal case arose when one of Spottiswood's clergy stabbed fatally Lord Balfour's son-in-law Sir John Wemyss, the High Sheriff of Fermanagh in 1626. Spottiswood refused to sign Ussher's declaration against Catholicism in 1626. He retained royal favour, turning down the archbishopric of Cashel in 1629.

When the Irish Rebellion of 1641, Spottiswood left for England. He died at Westminster in March 1645, and was buried in St Benedict's Chapel there on the 31st.

== Works ==
Spottiswood published his doctoral thesis, Concio J. Spottiswodii … quam habuit ad Clerum Andreanopoli … pro gradu Doctoratus, Edinburgh, 1616. He is believed to have been the author of an anonymous manuscript in the Auchinleck library, A Briefe Memoriall of the Life and Death of James Spottiswoode, bishop of Clogher. It contains information about his early years, but consists mainly of a long account of his private and public troubles as bishop; the last few pages are in another hand, and do not extend to the date of his death. The manuscript was edited and published by Sir Alexander Boswell in 1811 (Edinburgh). Spottiswood also published The Execution of Neshech and the Confyning of his brother Tarbith: or a short Discourse shewing the difference betwixt damned Usurie and that which is lawfull. Whereunto there is subjoyned an Epistle of … J. Calvin touching that same Argument … translated out of Latine, Edinburgh, 1616.

== Family ==
Spottiswood, who was married before taking orders, left a son, Sir Henry Spottiswood, and a daughter Mary, who married Abraham Crichton; Abraham Creighton, 1st Baron Erne was their grandson.
