= Patrick Quinn (priest) =

Roman Catholic priest

Patrick Quinn was appointed Vicar Apostolic to administer the See of Clogher by Pope Gregory XV on 30 July 1622.

== See also ==
- Roman Catholic Diocese of Clogher
