= Máel Ísu Ua Máel Chiaráin =

12th century Irish bishop

Máel Ísu Ua Máel Chiaráin (some sources Maelisa O'Mulkerin) was a bishop in Ireland during the 12th century: he was Bishop of Clogher from 1193 to 1197.
