= Reginald MacGilla Finin =

Irish priest

Reginald MacGilla Finin was an Irish priest in the 13th century. He is the earliest known Archdeacon of Clogher and was to have been Bishop of Clogher, but his election was set aside.
