= Piaras Mag Uidhir =

Irish priest

Piaras Mág Uidhir (Sometimes Anglicised to Peter Maguire) was a priest in Ireland during the 15th century.

He was Archdeacon of Clogher from 1423 to 1432; and Bishop of Clogher from then until his resignation in 1447. He died in 1450
