= Cornelius MacArdel =

Irish bishop

- Bishop of Clogher
- Church: Catholic Church
- See: Clogher
- In office: 1560 – 1568

Cornelius MacArdel was Bishop of Clogher from 1560 to 1568.

== See also ==
- Roman Catholic Diocese of Clogher
