= Mael Ísu Ua Cerbaill =

Irish bishop

Mael Ísu Ua Cerbaill was a bishop in Ireland during the 12th century. He served as the Bishop of Louth from 1182 and Archbishop of Armagh from 1184, holding both preferments until his death in 1187.
