= Désirée Stedman =

Désirée Stedman is a former Archdeacon of Ottawa. She is now an honorary assistant at Blackburn Hamlet.

Stedman was born in Ireland. Before ordination she was a physiotherapist. She trained for ordained ministry at St. Paul's University College and Montreal Diocesan Theological College.
