= Eugene McCaghwell =

Irish bishop

Eugene McCaghwell, was a bishop in Ireland in the early 16th century: he was Dean of Clogher until 1505, and bishop from then until his death in 1515. His brother William McCaghwell succeeded him as dean.
