= Hugh O'Reilly (bishop of Clogher) =

Irish Catholic bishop

Hugh O’Reilly
- Bishop of Clogher
- Church: Roman Catholic Church
- See: Clogher
- In office: 28 March 1777 – 3 September 1801
- Predecessor: Bishop Daniel O’Reilly
- Successor: Bishop James Murphy

Personal details
- Born: 1724; Drumgora, Lurgan, County Cavan
- Died: 3 September 1801

Hugh O’Reilly (1724–1801) was an Irish Catholic bishop.

== Biography ==
O’Reilly was appointed the Coadjutor Bishop of the Diocese of Clogher in Ireland on 27 April 1777. He was ordained a bishop on 29 July of that same year. He became Roman Catholic Bishop of Clogher on 28 March 1778, following the death of his predecessor, Daniel O'Reilly. Ordained a bishop at the age of 38, Hugh O’Reilly was the youngest bishop of the diocese in modern times. He died in office in on 3 September 1801 having served as bishop of his diocese for almost twenty-four years. O’Reilly was succeeded by Bishop James Murphy, who had was appointed his Coadjutor Bishop in May 1798. He is buried in the old Magheross graveyard in Carrickmacross.

== See also ==
- Roman Catholic Diocese of Clogher

Preceded by Bishop Daniel O’Reilly	Bishop of Clogher; 1778 – 1801	Succeeded by Bishop James Murphy
