= Daniel O'Reilly (bishop) =

Irish Catholic bishop (1700–1778)

Most Reverend Daniel O’Reilly
- Bishop of Clogher
- Church: Catholic Church
- See: Clogher
- In office: 13 November 1747 – 28 March 1778
- Predecessor: Bishop Ross Roe MacMahon
- Successor: Bishop Hugh O’Reilly
- Previous posts: President, Irish College, Antwerp

Personal details
- Born: 1699 Drumgora, Lurgan, County Cavan
- Died: 28 March 1778 (aged 78–79)

Daniel O’Reilly (1700–1778) was the Roman Catholic Bishop of Clogher from 1747 to 1778.

Born in Drumgora, Lurgan, County Cavan, Ireland, he was ordained to the priesthood in June 1728. He became President of the Irish College, Antwerp on 24 July 1732. He was appointed Roman Catholic Bishop of Clogher on 11 September 1747 following the appointment of his predecessor, Ross Roe MacMahon as Archbishop of Armagh.

Daniel O'Reilly was ordained a bishop on 13 November 1747 by Cardinal d'Alsace, Archbishop of Mechelen. He died in office on 28 March 1778 having served as bishop of his diocese for almost thirty-one years. Bishop Daniel O’Reilly was succeeded by his nephew Bishop Hugh O’Reilly. He is buried in the old graveyard at Lurgan, near Virginia, County Cavan. His tombstone reads Hic jacent ex..../Domini Danielis O'Reilly/per triginta annos Catholici/Clogherensis Episcopi/Obiit 24 Martii anno 1778/Aet 79.

== See also ==
- Diocese of Clogher

Catholic Church titles
Preceded by Bishop Ross Roe MacMahon	Bishop of Clogher; 1747 – 1778	Succeeded by Bishop Hugh O’Reilly
