= John Russell (priest, born 1792) =

Irish Anglican priest (1792-1865)

John Abraham Russell (6 November 1792 - 29 April 1865) was an Irish Anglican priest.

Russell was born in Limerick and educated at Trinity College, Dublin where he was a close friend of the poet Charles Wolfe. Russell edited Wolfe's poems and sermons, which were published with a brief biography in 1826. He was Archdeacon of Clogher from 1826 until his death.

He married Frances Story, who outlived him by many years, and had at least three sons and one daughter Geraldine, who married Heneage Horsley Jebb a descendant of Bishop Samuel Horsley.
