= Nehemias Ó Brácáin =

Irish bishop

Nehemias Ó Brácáin OCist was a bishop in Ireland during the 13th-century.

The Prior of Mellifont, he was elected by the Chapter in 1227. He was succeeded upon his death in 1240 by his brother David Ó Brácáin.
