= Kiltybegs =

Townland in County Monaghan, Ireland

Coordinates: 54°00′N 6°38′W

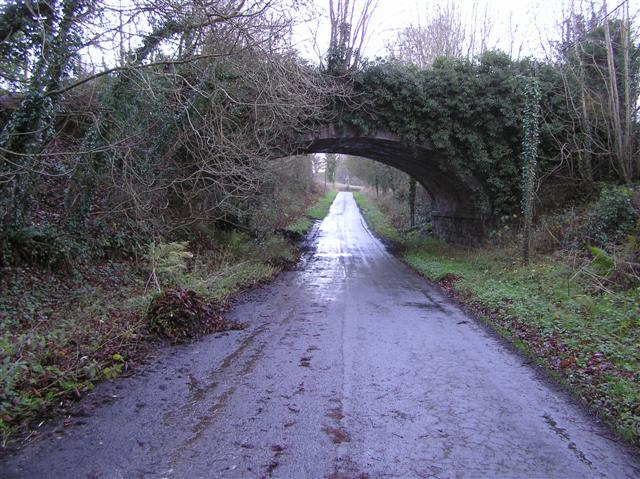
R185 Road at Kiltybegs

Kiltybegs is a townland in County Monaghan, Ireland.
