= David Ó Brácáin =

Irish bishop

David Ó Brácáin OCist was a bishop in Ireland during the 13th-century.

The brother of Nehemias Ó Brácáin, his see was greatly reduced during his episcopate. He died in 1267 and was buried at Mellifont Abbey.
