= Charles Stack (bishop) =

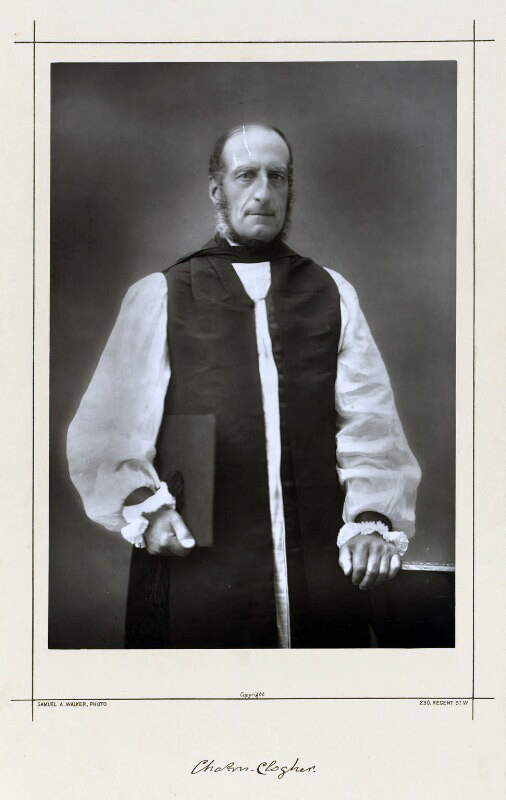
Charles Stack (June 1890)

Charles Maurice Stack (23 August 1825 – 1914) was an Anglican bishop in Ireland. Stack was born into an ecclesiastical family, the son of Reverend Edward Stack, and educated at Trinity College, Dublin where he graduated in 1848. He was Vicar of Lack, County Fermanagh from 1851 to 1877 when he became the Archdeacon of Clogher. He was appointed Bishop of Clogher in 1886 and served the diocese for 16 years, until he resigned due to advanced age in November 1902.

Religious titles
Preceded by Archbishops of Armagh	Bishop of Clogher; 1886–1902	Succeeded by Charles D'Arcy
