= Rossa mac Tomáis Óig Mág Uidhir =

Irish bishop

Rossa mac Tomáis Óig Mág Uidhir (Sometimes Anglicised to Ross Maguire) was Bishop of Clogher from his appointment on 21 July 1447 until his death in 1483.
