= Johannes Ó Corcráin =

Irish bishop

Johannes Ó Corcráin, OSB (sometimes Anglicised as John O'Corcoran) was a bishop in Ireland during the 14th century. Appointed by Pope Gregory XI in 1373, he held the See until 1389.
