= Tyner, West Virginia =

Tyner
- Unincorporated community
- Location within the state of West Virginia Tyner (the United States)
- Coordinates: 39°8′35″N 81°38′34″W
- Country: United States
- State: West Virginia
- County: Wood
- Elevation: 722 ft (220 m)
- Time zone: UTC-5 (Eastern (EST))
  - Summer (DST): UTC-4 (EDT)
- GNIS ID: 1560522

Tyner was an unincorporated community in Wood County, West Virginia, United States.

It was a post village.
