= James MacManaway (bishop) =

Irish Anglican bishop (1860–1947)

James MacManaway (1860 – 29 November 1947) was an Anglican bishop.

Born in County Roscommon in 1860, MacManaway was educated at Trinity College, Dublin and ordained in 1888. He was Curate of Clanabogan then Rector of Termonmaguirk; and after that the incumbent at Fivemiletown. He became a Canon of St Patrick's Cathedral, Dublin, in 1912 and Archdeacon of Clogher in 1917. He was appointed Bishop of Clogher in 1923 and served the diocese for 20 years. He died on 29 November 1947.

MacManaway married Sarah Thompson from County Kilkenny with whom he had sons Lancelot, Richard and James Godfrey and Daughter Mary. His son, James Godfrey MacManaway, was also a Church of Ireland clergyman and became a politician.

== Arms ==
Coat of arms of James MacManaway

Notes
Granted 10 December 1917 by George James Burtchaell, Deputy Ulster King of Arms.
Crest
A demi-lion rampant Gules holding between the paws a hand fesswise couped at the wrist Proper grasping a cross-crosslet fitchee Or.
Torse
Of the colours.
Escutcheon
Or two eagles displayed in chief and a lion rampant in base all Gules.
Motto
Per Fidem In Deo Vincimus
