= Archdeacon of Clogher =

Province of Armagh
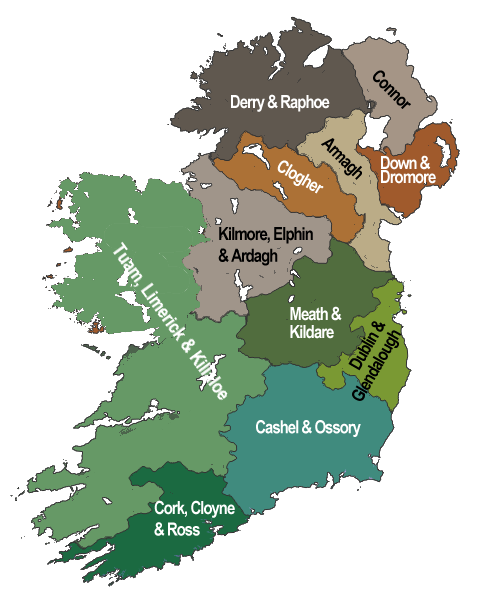
- Church: Church of Ireland
- Metropolitan bishop: Archbishop of Armagh
- Cathedral: St Patrick's Cathedral, Armagh (Church of Ireland)
- Dioceses: 7

The Archdeacon of Clogher is a senior ecclesiastical officer within the Anglican Diocese of Clogher. The Archdeacon is responsible for the disciplinary supervision of the clergy within the diocese. The archdeaconry can trace its history back to Reginald MacGilla Finin who held the office in 1268. The incumbent is Canon Paul Thompson.

== Notable incumbents ==
- Robert Heavener
- James Heygate
- James MacManaway
- Thomas Parnell
- John Russell
- Charles Stack
