= Smyly =

Smyly is a surname, and may refer to:

- Drew Smyly (born 1989), American baseball player
- Ellen Smyly (1815–1901), Irish charity worker
- Sir Philip Crampton Smyly (d. 1904), Surgeon-in-Ordinary to Queen Victoria and to successive Lords-Lieutenant of Ireland (son of the above)
- Sir Philip Crampton Smyly (colonial administrator) (1866–1953), Chief Justice of Sierra Leone, later Chief Justice of the Gold Coast (son of the above)
- Sir William Josiah Smyly (1850–1941), President Royal College of Physicians of Ireland (son of above Ellen Smyly, brother of Sir Philip d 1904)

== See also ==
- Smilie (disambiguation)
