= Mullanacre =

Mullanacre may refer to the following places in the Republic of Ireland:

- Mullanacre Lower
- Mullanacre Upper
