= Carrowmore, County Cavan =

Townland in County Cavan, Ireland

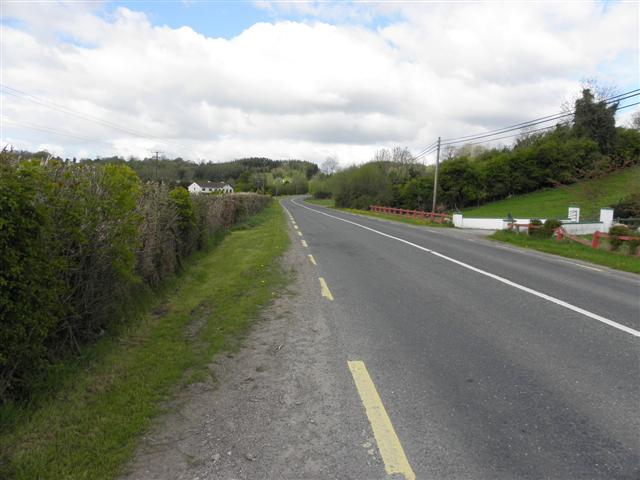
Road at Carrowmore townland, Tomregan, County Cavan, Ireland, heading west.

Carrowmore, County Cavan is a townland in the Parish of Tomregan, Barony of Tullyhaw, County Cavan, Ireland.

== Etymology ==
The townland name is an anglicisation of the Gaelic placename Ceathrú Mhór which means 'The Great Quarter'. It derives its name from the large size of the townland which in medieval times comprised a quarter of the ballybethagh of Calvagh, as it originally consisted of the present-day townlands of Carrowmore, Mullanacre Lower, Mullanacre Upper and Moher, a total of 2,066 statute acres. The oldest surviving mention of the name is on the 1609 Ulster Plantation Baronial map of Tullyhaw, where it is spelled Arrowmore. A 1610 grant spells the name as Kearowmore. A 1612 pardon spells it as Cearowmore. A 1630 Inquisition spells it as Carraghmore. The 1652 Commonwealth Survey spells the name as Karowmoreoghtragh. The 1659 Down Survey map spells it as Carrowmore. The 1663 Hearth Money Rolls spell it as Caramore and Upper Caramont. A 1666 grant spells it as Carranemore alias Kearrowmore. William Petty's 1685 map spells it as Carrowmore. The 1790 Cavan Carvaghs list spells the name as Carrumore, Itragh and Otragh (i.e. Íochtar meaning Lower and Uachtar meaning Upper). Ambrose Leet's 1814 Directory spells the name as Carromore.

== Geography ==
It is bounded on the north by Legavreagra and Aghnacally townlands and the international border with Fermanagh and Northern Ireland, on the east by Snugborough and Derryginny townlands, on the south by Lecharrownahone townland and on the west by Mullanacre Upper, Mullanacre Lower & Drumane townlands. Its chief geographical features are Loughan MacMartin mountain lake (In the Fermanagh Inquisitions of 1605 it is spelled Loghanmcmartin and in the 1761 Cavan Poll Book it is spelled Tullymcmartin), the Crooked River (Ireland), some mountain streams, quarries, gravel pits, forestry plantations and Slieve Rushen mountain, on whose southern slope it lies, reaching an altitude of 1,294 feet (394 m) above sea-level. It forms part of the Slieve Rushen Bog Natural Heritage Area. The townland is traversed by the N87 road (Ireland), the Bawnboy Road, the Laher Road, Carrowmore Lane and other minor lanes. The townland covers 981 statute acres, including 1-acre (4,000 m^{2}) of water. The sub-divisions of the townland are- Finthilough (Fionn Talamh = The White Land) and Stripe Hall.

== History ==
In the Plantation of Ulster by grant dated 23 June 1610, along with other lands, King James VI and I granted four polls in Kearowmore to Hugh Culme, esquire, as part of the Manor of Calva. Culme then surrendered his interest in Carrowmore to Walter Talbot of Ballyconnell. On 9 February 1612, King James issued pardons to Mulmory McParlan and Ever McParlan of Cearowmore for fighting against the king's forces. Walter Talbot died on 26 June 1625 at Ballyconnell and his son James Talbot succeeded to the Carrowmore lands aged just 10 years. An Inquisition held in Cavan Town on 20 September 1630 stated that Walter Talbot's lands included four polls in Carraghmore. James Talbot married Helen Calvert, the daughter of George Calvert, 1st Baron Baltimore of Maryland, US, in 1635 and had a son Colonel George Talbot who owned an estate in Cecil County, Maryland which he named Ballyconnell in honour of his native town in Cavan. George Talbot was appointed Surveyor-General of Maryland in 1683. In the aftermath of the Irish Rebellion of 1641, James Talbot's estate in Ballyconnell was confiscated in the Cromwellian Act for the Settlement of Ireland 1652 because he was a Catholic and he was granted an estate in 1655 at Castle Rubey, County Roscommon instead. He died in 1687.

By 1652 the Irish rebels in the Ballyconnell area had been defeated and the area was put under the control of the Cromwellian captain Thomas Gwyllym. He was a native of Glenavy, County Antrim where his father, Rev. Meredith Gwyllym, was vicar of the parishes of Glenavy, Camlin, Tullyrusk, Ballinderry & Magheragall from 1622 until sometime after 1634. Gwyllym's name first appears in the area as the owner in the 1652 Commonwealth Survey, which lists the townland as belonging to Captain Gwilliams and the tenants as Henry McGill and others. Gwyllym was also a Cavan Commissioner in the 1660 Hearth Money Ordinances and in the 1664 Hearth Money Rolls he has five hearths in Ballyconnell. In the Hearth Money Rolls compiled on 29 September 1663, there were seven Hearth Tax payers in Caramore- John O’Flynn, Tirle Magwire, Phillip Brady, Edmond Relly, Hugh Relly, Donoghy O Finegan and William Borke, all with one hearth and there were five occupiers of UpperCaramont- Cormucke O Dany, Tirle O Catany, Shane McKernan, Shane McLanery and Phillip O Relly all of whom had one hearth. After the restoration of King Charles II to the throne in 1660, James Talbot tried to have the Ballyconnell estate restored to him but a final grant was made to Thomas Gwyllym in August 1666, which included three parcels of land in Carranemore alias Kearrowmore, comprising 580 acres-32 perches; 192 acres-3 roods-28 perches and 338 acres-2 roods which was unprofitable land. Thomas Gwyllym died in 1681 and his son Colonel Meredith Gwyllym inherited the Ballyconnell estate, including Carrowmore. Colonel Meredith Gwyllym died in 1711 and the Ballyconnell estate passed to his eldest son, Meredith Gwyllym.

A deed dated 2 May 1724 by the aforesaid Meredith Gwyllym includes the townland as Carranemore alias Kearowmore.

The Gwyllym estate was sold for £8,000 in 1724 to Colonel Alexander Montgomery (1686–1729) of Convoy House, County Donegal, M.P. for Donegal Borough 1725 to 1727 & for Donegal County 1727 to 1729.

A lease dated 14 May 1728 by the aforesaid Alexander Montgomery included Carranemore alias Kearowmore.

Montgomery died in 1729 and left the Ballyconnell estate to his nephew George Leslie, who then assumed the name of George Leslie Montgomery. George Leslie Montgomery was M.P. for Strabane, County Tyrone from 1765 to 1768 and for County Cavan from 1770 to 1787, when he died and left the Ballyconnell estate to his son George Montgomery, whose estate was administered by the Court of Chancery as he was a lunatic. George Montgomery died in 1841 and his estate went to his Enery cousins of Bawnboy. In 1856 they sold the estate to take advantage of its increased value owing to the opening of the Woodford Canal through the town in the same year. The estate, including Carrowmore, was split up among different purchasers and maps & details of previous leases of the sold parts are still available.

In the Cavan Poll Book of 1761, there were two people registered to vote in Carrowmore in the Irish general election, 1761: Patrick Hewitt and Robert Holyday. They were each entitled to cast two votes. The four election candidates were Charles Coote, 1st Earl of Bellomont and Lord Newtownbutler (later Brinsley Butler, 2nd Earl of Lanesborough), both of whom were then elected Member of Parliament for Cavan County. The losing candidates were George Montgomery (MP) of Ballyconnell and Barry Maxwell, 1st Earl of Farnham. Absence from the poll book either meant a resident did not vote or, more likely, was not a freeholder entitled to vote, which would mean most of the inhabitants of Carrowmore.

The Tithe Applotment Books for 1827 list the following tithepayers in the townland- McGauran, McTeague, Smyth, Brady, Donahey, Hewit, Greg, Netterville, Anderson, Holiday, Christy, Moore, Baxter, Gallagher, Patterson, McGuire, McKernan, Veitch, Kelly, Clerk, Malone, Biggars.

The Ordnance Survey Name Books for 1836 give the following description of the townland- Ceathramhadh mhór, 'great quarter'. Property of Montgomery. Rent 16 shillings to £1 per arable acre. The mountain land is free of rent. Plenty of limestone. Lowland is gravelly soil. Produces oats, flax and potatoes. A new and old road passes through it to Swanlinbar. About 3/4 is mountain and pasture, with 30 acres of bog.

In January 1839 on the Night of the Big Wind a ghost story occurred in Carrowmore. In the Dúchas Folklore Collection, a story by Mr Thomas O'Reilly, Church Street, Ballyconnell in 1938 gives more details.

The Carrowmore Valuation Office Field books are available for 1840.

A deed dated 1 April 1854 now in the Cavan Archives Service (ref P017/0063) is described as-

Lease made between William Hamilton Enery, Ballyconnell House, County Cavan, esquire, and Owen Magauran, Carramore, County Cavan, in respect of part of the lands of Mullanacre Upper (Mullinacree Upper), parish of Tomregan, barony of Tullyhaw, County Cavan. Bounded on the north by the large mountain, on the south by the river separating it from Moher, on the east by the river separating it from Carramore and on the west by the road leading to the mountain. Contains 20 acres late Irish plantation measure. Lease to run for the natural lives of Victoria Adelaide Mary Louisa, Princess Royal of England, and Albert Edward, Prince of Wales, or term of 31 years, whichever is longer. Annual rent of £3 sterling. Magauran covenants to do suit and service at the Manor of Gwyllym Brooke and perform all lawful customs associated with the Manor.

Griffith's Valuation of 1857 lists the landlords of the townland as the Annesley Estate, Harper, Benson, Reilly and McNally & the tenants as McTeague, Reilly, Maguire, Freehill, McGovern, Brady, Donohoe, Benson, Shannon, Kelly, Flynn, Veitch, Emo, Gregg, Biggins, Halliday, McKnight, McNally, Gwynne, Henderson, Netterville, Graham, Bannan and Cairnes.

In the Dúchas Folklore Collection there is a description of Carrowmore in 1938 by Bernard Freehill.

== Census ==
Year	Population	Males	Females	Total Houses	Uninhabited
1841	280	137	143	54	0
1851	218	109	109	41	1
1861	214	111	103	45	0
1871	151	72	79	33	0
1881	140	71	69	25	0
1891	113	55	58	24	2

A rare surviving page from the 1851 Census of Ireland lists the household of Peter Magauran of Carrowmore.

In the 1901 census of Ireland, there are twenty-four families listed in the townland.

In the 1911 census of Ireland, there are twenty-one families listed in the townland.

== Antiquities ==
1. Parra Chreestha Holy Well (Párc Chríost = Christ's Field or Párc Risteáird = Richard's Field), also called 'Poll na Cluatne' or 'Poll na Cluster' on the border with Derryginny townland. The local tradition is that it was originally situated in Derryginny but a woman washed clothes in it so it moved overnight to Carrowmore. Mass was celebrated there in Penal times.
2. Carrowmore Hedge School. In 1835 the headmistress was Fanny Haliday, who taught reading, writing, arithmetic and needlework. There were 42 pupils, 12 boys and 30 girls. The school was supported by the London Hibernian Society and supported by £2 subscriptions and payments of 1s to 1/6d per quarter.
