= Urwick =

Urwick is a surname. Notable people with the surname include:

- Lyndall Urwick (1891–1983), British management consultant and business thinker
- Alan Urwick (1930–2016), British diplomat
- William Urwick the elder (1791–1868), English congregational minister in Ireland
- William Urwick the younger (1826–1905), Anglo-Irish nonconformist minister, son of William Urwick the elder
- Reginald Urwick (1876–1964), British philatelist
