= Alexander Dallas (priest) =

British Church of England minister

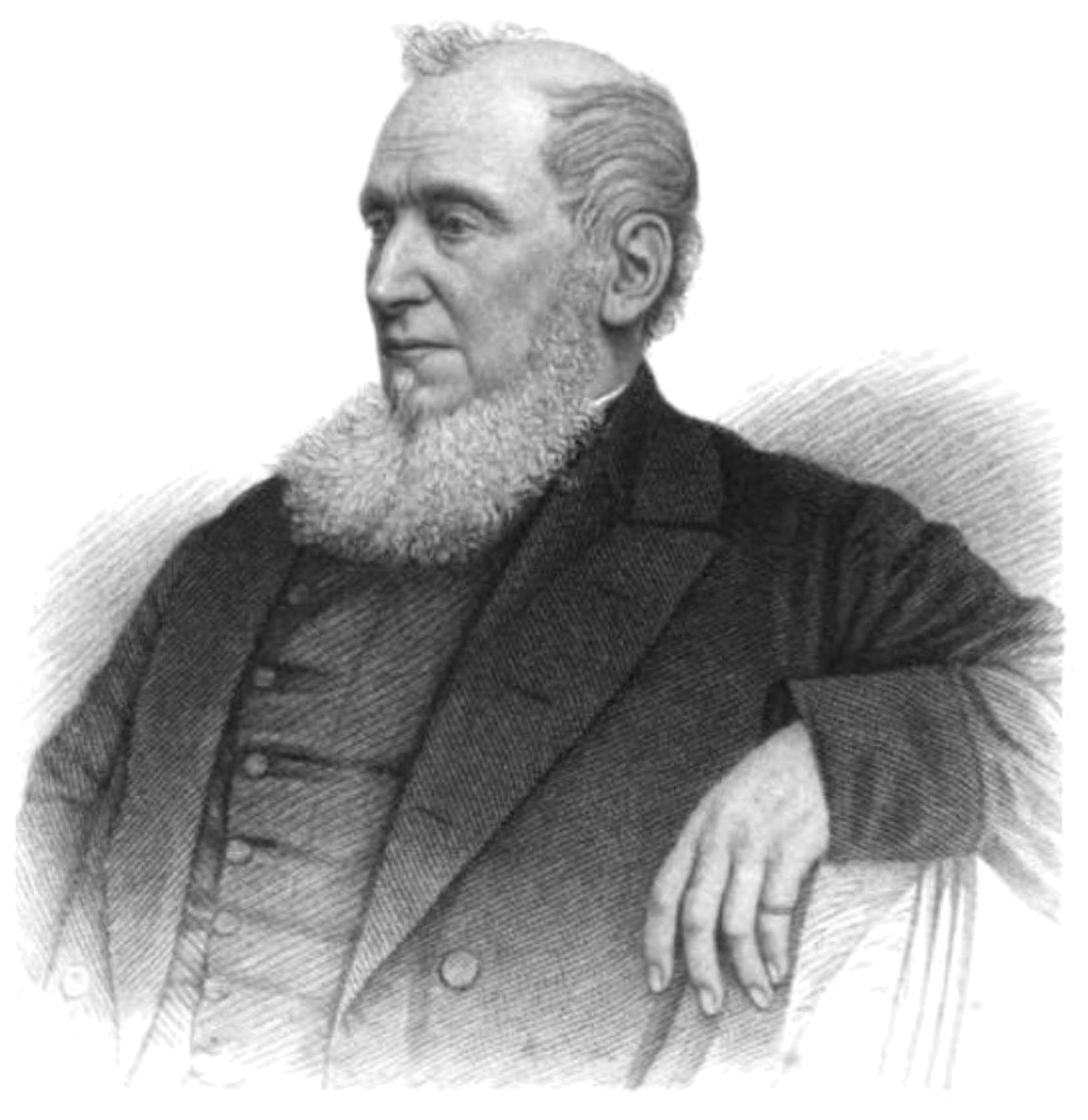
- Born: 29 March 1791; Colchester, Essex
- Died: 12 December 1869 (aged 78); Lee, London

Ecclesiastical career
- Ordained: 1821
- Military career
- Branch: British Army
- Service years: 1810–1815
- Rank: Assistant Commissary General
- Unit: Commissariat Department
- Conflicts: Napoleonic Wars; Peninsular War; Siege of Cádiz; Battle of Barrosa; Battle of Vitoria; Hundred Days; Battle of Waterloo
- Awards: Military General Service Medal

Alexander Robert Charles Dallas (29 March 1791 – 12 December 1869) was an author, Church of England minister and Rector of Wonston in Hampshire from 1828 to 1869, a member of the family that descended from James Dallas of Ross-shire in Scotland.

== Early life ==
He was born in Colchester, the son of a barrister, the Jamaica born Robert Charles Dallas (1754–1824), who wrote a history of the Second Maroon War. His grandfather, Dr. Robert Charles Dallas (1710–1769), was a doctor who amassed a fortune in Jamaica. Dr. Dallas bought the Boar Castle estate on the Cane River, Jamaica in 1758, changing its name to Dallas Castle. He left the island in 1764, having mortgaged the estate and put it in a trust. This property included 900 acres and 91 slaves.

Dallas was educated at home to age 11, and then at a school in Kennington. Through his father, he became a clerk in the Treasury, in 1805. He went on to be a supplies officer during the Peninsular War. He was present at the Battle of Waterloo in 1815.

Dallas married in 1818. He entered the Middle Temple to study law in 1819. He left soon, and in 1820 matriculated at Worcester College, Oxford, at age 28. There he encountered evangelicals, and did not complete a degree. He was ordained a deacon and then a priest in the Church of England in 1821, and became curate of Radley.

== Missionary work ==
Dallas began his mission to Ireland in 1843, and established the Irish Church Missions to Roman Catholics on 28 March 1849. A number of churches, schools, missions and orphanages were set up. Dallas was Honorary Secretary to the Missions. They were seen as proselytising during the Irish Famine, and attracted the slur of soupers. In the west of Ireland, particularly Galway, Dallas's evangelistic approach caused community tensions. He moved for a while to Castlekirke on Lough Corrib where he set up a school. He had his sermons translated from English to the Irish Language for the native population. Rev. Dallas and the ICM entered into partnership with the Irish Society for Promoting the Education of the Native Irish through the Medium of Their Own Language. In the west, Rev. Dallas' anti-catholic tirades caused much bitterness within the Irish Society, with the Dublin University branch opposing the alliance.

One of his supporters in Dublin was Ellen Smyly, a philanthropist who had set up schools and homes in Dublin, the Smyly Homes. His friends included many prominent Irish Protestants including members of the Guinness family.

His attitudes and inspiration for his missions could have been due to his belief in Premillennialism or Millennialism, and the famine was a portent. Also that the practice of Catholicism was responsible for poverty and disorder.

== Personal life ==
At Morden, Surrey on 4 May 1818 Dallas married Mary Anne Ferguson, widow of James Edge, with whom he had two daughters and four sons. His first wife Ann Mary died in 1847, and he married his second wife, Anne Biscoe, in 1849.

== Death ==
Dallas died on 12 December 1869 in Wonston and is buried there in the churchyard. There is a monument to his memory in St. Patrick’s Cathedral, Dublin and in a church in Clifden, Connemara in Ireland, there is a commemoration regarding his efforts with the Irish Church Mission, with the inscription laboured prayerfully for the salvation of the perishing Roman Catholics of Ireland.

Following his death his wife published a memoir to him.

== Famous relatives ==
He was the nephew of US Treasury Secretary Alexander J. Dallas and was the first cousin of the US Senator and vice president George M. Dallas. He was the maternal grandfather of Edward Seymour, 16th Duke of Somerset. His father was related by marriage to Lord Byron and a friend of his. Alexander compiled a book of recollections and correspondence between his father and Lord Byron.

== Publications ==
- The Pastors Assistant by Rev Alexander Dallas
- The Cottagers Guide to the New Testament by Alexander Dallas
- Pastoral superintendence; its motive, its detail and its support By Alexander Robert Charles Dallas
- Felix Alvarez; or, Manners in Spain By Alexander Robert Charles Dallas
- The Point of Hope in Ireland's present crisis by the Rev. Alexander Dallas, M.A.,(Rector of Wonston, Hants.), James Nesbit and Co, 1849.
- The banner of the truth in Ireland: monthly information concerning Irish Church Missions to the Roman Catholics. By Society for Irish Church Missions to the Roman Catholics 1852.
- Recollections of the life of Lord Byron By Robert Charles Dallas, Alexander Robert Charles Dallas.
