= Irish Evangelical Society =

Organisation promoting Protestant Christianity in Ireland

Irish Evangelical Society (IES), was an organisation founded in 1814 to promote the Protestant faith in Ireland. It was initially founded in London. Its aim was to support preachers and priests of the Reformed faith outside the established Church of Ireland. It was supported by a number of Evangelical members of the Church of Ireland, as well as members of the society in England. As a result, it supported Independent Ministers, priests and Chapels. It became closely aligned to the Congregationalists, and was pretty much absorbed by Congregational Union of Ireland by 1899.

It was often at odds with the London-based organisation supporting evangelisation in Ireland and it.

The IES founded an academy for the training of ministers, in Manor Street, Dublin, this academy was dissolved in 1828.

Churches in Dublin it supported included York Street, Plunket Street Meeting House, and Zion Chapel, Kings Inns Street.

Rev. William Cooper served as secretary, Rev. Dr. William Ulrick (York Street Church.), James Clarke, and Rev. David Stuart (New Marys Abbey) were involved in the society.

== See also ==
- Evangelical Anglicanism
- Association for the Discountenancing of Vice
- Irish Church Mission
- Irish Society for Promoting the Education of the Native Irish through the Medium of Their Own Language
- London Hibernian Society
