= London Hibernian Society =

London Hibernian Society, or more formally known as the London Hibernian Society for establishing schools and circulating the Holy Scriptures in Ireland was an evangelical organisation founded January 15, 1806, for the diffusion of religious knowledge in Ireland, to promote the reformed faith in Ireland. It was founded by evangelical members of the Church of England and the Church of Ireland but included members of other Protestant denominations, and was part of what became known as the Second Reformation. As well as involved in the distribution of Religious material, and education, the Society employed itinerant preachers travelling in Ireland.

In August 1807 the society asked Thomas Charles(a Welsh Calvinistic Methodist, Dr. David Bogue (a non-conformist preacher), the Rev. Joseph Hughes (a Baptist), and Samuel Mills (member of the British Foreign Bible Society) to visit Ireland to report on the state of Protestant religion in the country. Their report initiated amongst other things, considerable involvement in the provision of education in Ireland in the nineteenth century. In 1814 the society decided to concentrate on Education. Using funds from benefactors, and working with funding through the Kildare Place Society from the British government, schools were established. By 1823 the Society had 61,387 day pupils in its 618 schools. As the LHS concentrated on education in 1814 the Irish Evangelical Society was set up in London.

One of the activities of the LHS was the production of educational and religious material in the Irish Language. Thady Connellan who had attended an LHS school in Sligo, converted to Protestantism, and taught in the LHS school, produced many Irish language books and pamphlets, as well as an Irish-English dictionary.

== See also ==
- Irish Church Mission
- Irish Evangelical Society
- Irish Society for Promoting the Education of the Native Irish through the Medium of Their Own Language
- Association for the Discountenancing of Vice
