= Robert Charles Dallas =

Jamaican-born British poet and conservative writer

Robert Charles Dallas (1754 – 1824) was a Jamaican-born British poet and conservative writer. He is known also for a contentious book on Lord Byron, and a history of the Second Maroon War.

== Family ==
Robert Charles Dallas was born in Kingston, Jamaica, where his father, Robert Dallas, M.D., of Dallas Castle, Jamaica, was a physician; his mother was a daughter of Colonel Cormack or Cammack.

The elder Robert Dallas came to Jamaica from Scotland around 1730. His first wife was Mary Frances Main, daughter of Samuel Themer Main, a merchant of Kingston. Dr Dallas then had a long-standing affair with Sarah Hewitt, née Cammack, and Robert Charles Dallas was born 14 July 1754. Sarah had previously married John Hewitt in 1751. Robert Charles was born illegitimate, and his parents eventually married in 1769, in England, after John Hewitt's death.

A brother of Dallas was Alexander James Dallas. There were at least two other brothers (one possibly a half-brother) and two sisters in the family. Dr Dallas died in 1769, shortly after marrying Sarah Hewitt. His will left his estate to his wife Sarah. Dr. Dallas bought the Boar Castle estate on the Cane River, Jamaica in 1758, changing its name to Dallas Castle. He left the island in 1764, having mortgaged the estate and put it in a trust. This property included 900 acres and 91 slaves.

== Early life ==
Robert Charles Dallas was educated at Musselburgh, in Scotland, and under James Elphinston at Kensington, London. He entered the Inner Temple, but on coming of age went to Jamaica to take possession of the estates which he had inherited, and became an official there. After three years he visited England and married. He returned with his wife to Jamaica. He subsequently resigned his post and left Jamaica for the sake of his wife's health.

== Later life ==
Dallas lived on the continent of Europe, moving to the United States of America when the French Revolution occurred. He was disappointed in America and returned to England. He had sold the Dallas Castle estate on Jamaica by 1810. He died in autumn 1824 at Sainte-Adresse, Normandy, France, and was buried at Le Havre.

== Works ==
Dallas wrote a great deal: he said himself that he aimed to oppose the Jacobins and "confusion".

=== The History of the Maroons (1803) ===
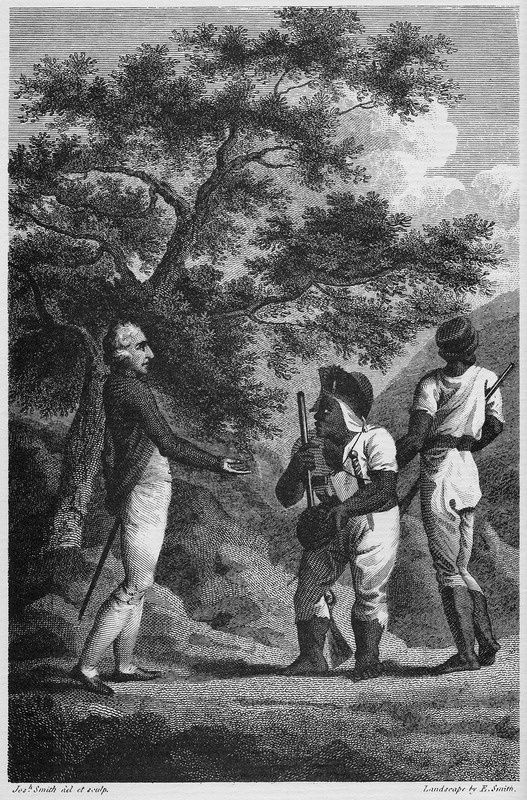
"Old Cudjoe making peace", engraving from The History of the Maroons (1803)

In 1803 Dallas contributed to the documentation of Jamaican history with The History of the Maroons from their Origin to the Establishment of their Chief Tribe at Sierra Leone, (2 vols). In part a general history of Jamaica, which was written by John Browne Cutting, the book concentrated on the Second Maroon War and the subsequent deportations of the Jamaican Maroons of Cudjoe's Town (Trelawny Town) to Nova Scotia and Sierra Leone. Dallas had accounts from William Dawes Quarrell, who accompanied Maroons to Nova Scotia, and may be the plantation owner of Hanover Parish of that name; and William Robertson, who had served in the war. James Robertson the surveyor and cartographer made a map of the Cockpit Country for the book.

This work was published in a period when much public attention had been given over to the revolutionary events in Europe. The matter had previously been treated by Bryan Edwards in an account first published in 1796. Dallas expressed disapproval of slavery, but defended some government positions.

Dallas has been identified as also the author of the anonymous travel book A Short Journey in the West Indies (1790), mainly about Jamaica, which makes anti-slavery and anti-planter remarks. The Monthly Review commented that the author was cashing in on public interest in the slavery question, and had exaggerated the hardships. James Stephen, who was aware of Dallas's authorship of A Short Journey, regarded The History of the Maroons as a defence of slavery against his own book The Crisis of the Sugar Colonies (1802).

=== Recollections of the Life of Lord Byron ===
Dallas is best known for a connection with Lord Byron, and his Recollections of the Life of Lord Byron from the year 1808 to the end of 1814 appeared posthumously, by a tortuous route. His sister Henrietta Charlotte was married to the Hon. George Anson Byron, an uncle of Byron.

Dallas introduced himself to Byron by letter on the publication of Hours of Idleness (1807). Dallas saw something of Byron after the poet's return from the Near East, gave him literary advice, and communicated for him with publishers; Byron in recognition gave him copyright for some of Childe Harold's Pilgrimage, and for The Corsair. But Dallas's didactic line palled, and Byron, after corresponding with Dallas in 1808–11, dropped him.

Some letters addressed by Byron to his mother during his eastern travels were given to Dallas by Byron. Dallas, on the strength of these and other communications, prepared an account of Byron's life from 1808 to 1814. He notified Byron in 1819 that the Recollections were finished, and would be published only after his own death.

When Byron died in April 1824, Dallas proposed to publish the Recollections. On the grapevine (via Byron's aunt Julia Heath) Augusta Leigh, Byron's half-sister who was dealing with a number of would-be biographers, heard of the plan and objected strongly. Dallas won over George Anson Byron, his brother-in-law. John Cam Hobhouse and John Hanson, Byron's executors, obtained an injunction from Lord Eldon against the publication of the letters. Extracts from the Recollections appeared in The Courier, in November 1824, but about a month behind Thomas Medwin's Conversations of Lord Byron.

By the time of the Courier publication, Dallas had returned to France and died. There was a French version, and his son Alexander Dallas had the book published in 1825, in Paris, beyond the English court's jurisdiction, if also much changed.

=== Other works ===
Dallas's other works included:

- Miscellaneous Writings, consisting of Poems; Lucretia, a Tragedy; and Moral Essays, with a Vocabulary of the Passions, 1797.
- Percival, or Nature Vindicated, 4 vols. 1801, novel.
- Elements of Self-Knowledge (compiled and partly written by Dallas), 1802.
- Aubrey, 4 vols. 1804, novel.
- The Marlands, Tales illustrative of the Simple and Surprising, 4 vols. 1805.
- The Knights, Tales illustrative of the Marvellous, 3 vols. 1808.
- Not at Home, a Dramatic Entertainment, 1809.
- The New Conspiracy against the Jesuits detected, 1815 (in French, 1816).
- Letter to C. Butler relative to the New Conspiracy, 1817.
- Sir Francis Darrell, or the Vortex, 4 vols. 1820, novel.
- Adrastus, a Tragedy; Amabel, or the Cornish Lovers; and other Poems, 1823.

His Miscellaneous Works and Novels, in 7 vols., were published in 1813.

== Family ==
Dallas married Sarah, daughter of Benjamin Harding of Hacton House, Essex; Rev. Alexander Robert Charles Dallas was their son. Harding was a slave-owner in Jamaica, whose will had been proved in 1766.

== Notes ==
Attribution

This article incorporates text from a publication now in the public domain: Stephen, Leslie, ed. (1888). "Dallas, Robert Charles". Dictionary of National Biography. Vol. 13. London: Smith, Elder & Co.
