= Drumane =

Townland in the civil parish of Templeport, County Cavan, Ireland

Coordinates: 54.07514°N 7.810271°W

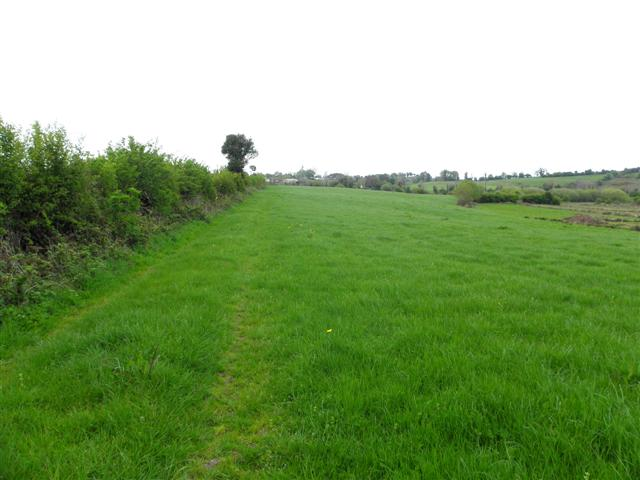
Drumane townland, Templeport, County Cavan, Ireland, looking south.

Drumane (from Irish Droim Éan, meaning 'Ridge of the Birds') is a townland in the civil parish of Templeport, County Cavan, Ireland. It lies in the Roman Catholic parish of Templeport and barony of Tullyhaw.

== Geography ==
Drumane is bounded on the north by Mullanacre Lower townland in Tomregan parish, on the west by Bofealan townland, on the south by Killynaff and Lecharrownahone townlands and on the east by Carrowmore, County Cavan townland in Tomregan parish. Its main geographical features are the Crooked River (Ireland), a small wood and a gravel pit. Dromane is traversed by a minor road and rural lanes. The townland covers 147 statute acres.

== History ==
The 1609 Baronial Map depicts the townland as Drommeane. The 1652 Commonwealth Survey spells the name as Dromeane. The 1665 Down Survey map depicts it as Dromane. William Petty's 1685 map depicts it as Dromean.

In the Plantation of Ulster by grant dated 4 June 1611, King James VI and I granted, along with other lands, one poll of Dromeane to Donill Backagh McShane O'Reyly. He was the nephew of the O'Reilly Clan chief, Aodh Connallach mac Maolmhordha who ruled from 1565 to 1583. He was a nephew of the O'Reilly Clan chief, Aodh Connallach mac Maolmhordha who ruled from 1565 to 1583. His genealogy is Domhnall Bacach son of Seaán son of Maol Mórdha (d. 1565) son of Seaán (d.1516) son of Cathal (d.1467) son of Eóghan na Fésóige (d.1449).

By grant dated 29 April 1611, the king granted one poll in Dromene Eightragh (from Irish Droim Éan Íochtarach, meaning 'The Lower Ridge of the Birds') to Hugh McManus Oge Magauran, gentleman. He was the great-grandson of Tomás mac Maghnus Mág Samhradháin who was chief of the McGovern Clan from 1512 to 1532. Hugh was also granted land in Crossmakelagher and Bofealan.

The O'Reillys later sold the land to Walter Talbot of Ballyconnell who died on 26 June 1625. His son James Talbot succeeded to the Ballyconnell estate aged just 10 years. An Inquisition held in Cavan on 20 September 1630 found that James Talbot was seized of one poll of Dromyne, along with other lands. In 1635 James Talbot married Helen Calvert, the daughter of George Calvert, 1st Baron Baltimore of Maryland, USA. In the Cromwellian Act for the Settlement of Ireland 1652, James Talbot's estate was confiscated because he was a Catholic and he was granted an estate in 1655 at Castle Rubey, County Roscommon instead. He died in 1687. Talbot's land in Drumane was distributed as follows-

In the Hearth Money Rolls compiled on 29 September 1663 there were three Hearth Tax payers in Dromene- Phillip O Relly, Patricke O Relly and Edmond McKernan.

The 1652 Commonwealth Survey lists the proprietor as being Lieutenant John Blackforde and the tenant as Gilleesaog O'Rely, they also appear as proprietor and tenant for several other Templeport townlands in the same survey. John Blachford was born in 1598 in Ashmore, Dorset, England, the son of Richard and Frances Blachford. He became a merchant in Dorchester, Dorset but fled to France in 1633 when facing a warrant from the Exchequer for not paying customs. He married Mary Renald from Devon and died at Lissanover, County Cavan in 1661 and was buried at St. Orvins in Dublin (probably St. Audoen's Church, Dublin (Church of Ireland)) despite wishing to be buried back in Dorchester. His will was published on 9 January 1665 leaving his son John Blachford as his sole heir. An Inquisition held in Cavan on 21 May 1667 found that his widow Mary Blachford and his heir John were seized of, inter alia, the land of Dromeane alias Dromeightragh. He had sons John, Thomas, Ambrose and William (who became a Major) and daughters Mary and Frances. Major William Blachford was born in 1658 and died at Lissanover on 28 March 1727. The Blachford family gravestones in Templeport Church read as follows- This monument was erected by MAJOR WILLIAM / BLASHFORD of Lisnover in 1721 to the memory of / his father, JOHN BLASHFORD, late of the same Esqr. but / from Dorchester in Dorsetshire, the place of his / nativity, who in his lifetime chose this for a burying / place, for himself and family, but died in Dublin / was buried in St. Orvins Church but his wife, MARY / RENALD of a Devonsheire family is buried here / as also three sons and two daughters, viz JOHN / AMBROSE AND THOMAS; MARY AND FRANCES / Here likewise lies buried two wives of MAJOR WILLIAM BLASHFORD, son to the said JOHN BLASHFORD viz / MARY MAGHEE of an ancient Family in Lincolnsheire. CORNET CHIDLEY BLACHFORD, son to MAJOR WILLIAM BLACHFORD, leys buried here who dyed August ye 29th, 1722. This aboue MAJOR WILLIAM BLACHFORD. / That erected this monument, died the 28th of March 1727, aged 69 years.

A deed dated 10 May 1744 spells the name as Dromean.

The 1790 Cavan Carvaghs list spells the name as Dromeone.

The Tithe Applotment Books for 1827 list eleven tithepayers in the townland.

The Drumane Valuation Office Field books are available for December 1839.

Griffith's Valuation of 1857 lists twelve landholders in the townland.

== Census ==
Year	Population	Males	Females	Total Houses	Uninhabited
1841	63	29	34	9	0
1851	30	16	14	8	0
1861	31	20	11	7	1
1871	26	11	15	5	1
1881	28	19	9	5	1
1891	31	18	13	5	1

In the 1901 census of Ireland, there are three families listed in the townland and in the 1911 census of Ireland, there are four families listed in the townland.

== Antiquities ==
There seem to be no sites of historical interest in the townland.
