= Irish Church Missions =

Anglican organization

The Irish Church Missions (ICM) is a conservative Anglican mission society founded in 1849 as The Irish Church Missions to the Roman Catholics, originally focused on proselytising to Irish Roman Catholics.

The society was supported chiefly by English Anglicans though with the backing and support of Church of Ireland clergy and bishops, with the aim of converting the Roman Catholics of Ireland to Protestantism. The reference to Roman Catholics in the title was removed in 2001.

In December 2024, Irish Church Missions affiliated with the Anglican Convocation in Europe a diocese part of the Global Anglican Future Conference aligned Anglican Network in Europe after being disaffiliated from the Church of Ireland Diocese of Dublin and Glendalough in 2021.

== Current activities ==
ICM currently operates five mission congregations in Dublin.

- Immanuel Church Dublin
- Iranian Gospel Church Dublin
- City Church Dublin
- Christ Church North Dublin
- Trinity Church Cherrywood

In recent years Irish Church Missions has been committed to church planting in the Dublin area as a result of its evangelical convictions.

In addition to this work it is also involved in a lunchtime talks initiative in the Dublin Docklands area - Dublin Bible Talks and is a founding member of the Irish Gospel Partnership.

== History ==
The inspiration for the beginning of the organization came from the Revd. Alexander Dallas (1791–1869), Rector of Wonston, Hampshire, who since 1843 had been involved in actively evangelizing Roman Catholic people in Ireland. Dallas began his missionary work in Ireland by sending over 20,000 letters to householders throughout Ireland. He followed this up by sending eight missionaries to preach throughout the country and personally conducted a preaching tour in the West of Ireland in Galway and Connemara. The result of his missionary work by 1848 was the setting up of a missionary school and church in Castlekerke, near Galway.

From 1846 the Mission was supported by wealthy English Businessman Edward Durrant. Dallas advanced the work through the provision of Scripture Readers, missionary clergymen and the support of the Bishops and Clergy of the Church of Ireland. Scripture Readers were fluent Irish speakers who were trained to preach the Gospel and refute what they considered false doctrine. Initially the work of ICM was concentrated in the West of Ireland. However, the 1861 census revealed the ICM's missionary work as a relative failure. The ICM retreated from the west and subsequent work centred on the city of Dublin, where it continued in the attempt to draw converts from the Roman Catholic population. By the time of his death in 1869, Dallas had established 21 churches, 49 schools, and four orphanages and had between 400 and 500 full-time workers employed in preaching the Gospel throughout Ireland. Renowned missionary and explorer Henry Lansdell was the secretary of the organization from 1869 to 1879. The further continuing gradual decline of the organisation and estrangement from mainstream Anglican thought in southern Ireland is outlined in Moffitt's, The Irish Church Missions to the Roman Catholics 1849–1950 (MUP 2011).

The evangelistic work of Irish Church Missions on Bachelor's Walk, near O'Connell Street, continues amongst Dublin's student and international community.

=== Famine ===
During the Irish Famine, ICM operated soup kitchens and schools that were seen by many as conditional on religious conversion, a practice that drew accusations of "souperism". Historian Miriam Moffitt notes that while the mission saw its activities as benevolent, many locals perceived them as exploitative.Moffitt, Miriam (Summer 2010). "The Society for Irish Church Missions to the Roman Catholics: Philanthropy or Bribery?". Studies: An Irish Quarterly Review. 99 (394): 169–181. JSTOR 25749829.

The ICM was particularly controversial during the period of the Irish Famine (1845–1852) believing the famine to be a judgment from God on Irish Catholics who had clung to the Catholic faith – "The truth of the Scriptures was verified in the groans of the dying, and their wails for the dead". The organisation was also criticised for tying material to spiritual aid. The organisation is synonymous with the souperism of the famine period, particularly in Connemara, where relief was often conditional upon the conversion of the recipient to Anglicanism. The ICM drew much of its support from Britain, while it divided the Church of Ireland. Miriam Moffitt, Postdoctorate Research Fellow at NUI Maynooth stated in her book Soupers and Jumpers, that in reality the poor of Connemara found themselves pawns in a power struggle between the Protestant and Roman Catholic churches. The ICM at the time was receiving £26,000 annually in donations from England for their efforts.

Some of the ICM projects in the west were in partnership with the Irish Society for Promoting the Education of the Native Irish through the Medium of Their Own Language. However, Rev. Dallas' anti-catholic tirades cause much dissension within the Irish Society, which, contrary to ICM practice, did not always require its scripture readers to first convert to Anglicanism.

Among the places set up and funded by the ICM were in Clifden, Glenowen for girls and Ballyconree for boys), the Connemara Orphan's Nursery (Spiddal Orphanage), and Aasleagh Orphanage, Leenane (Leenaun) in Co. Galway. John Hall, a staunch Protestant and supporter of the ICM, bought Letterfrack from the quaker Ellis family for use by the ICM. It later was taken over by the Roman Catholic Irish Christian Brothers, who used it as a reformatory or "industrial school". The Sherwood Fields Orphanage was built in 1862 by the ICM, it cease operation and in 1932 became a National School.

=== Ragged Schools and Residential Homes ===
After the retreat from the west the ICM began more vigorous activity in Dublin particularly in poor areas such as the Liberties. These efforts and that of other Protestants provoked Roman Catholic opposition, for instance from the Society of St. Vincent De Paul.

Rev. Dallas and the Irish Church Missions, with the Anglican philanthropist and proselytiser Mrs Ellen Smyly, helped set up schools and homes in Townsend St., Dublin (John Casey the father of the playwright Sean O'Casey worked here). These were to become the first of her "Smyly Homes". Rev. Dallas and Ellen Smyly opened The Irish Church Missionaries Ragged School in the Coombe. Opened initially in 1853 in Weaver's Hall, later moved to the corner of Newmarket Street, the home was closed in 1944 and children were moved to the Smyly home in Monkstown. For 20 years the ICM also sponsored a pamphlet Erin's Hope produced by The Smyly Homes and edited by a worker there, Sarah Davies. Other Homes or Schools of the Mission were at Lurgan Street Ragged Home, Luke Street Girls' Home and the William Henry Elliott Home.

Serious physical and sexual abuse of children was carried out, acknowledged, and apologised for at Manor House Home, Lisburn, Northern Ireland, run by Irish Church Missions.

=== TC Hammond ===
Perhaps the most famous of those who served in ICM is Thomas Chatterton Hammond (1877–1961). He entered the ICM training school in 1895, working as an evangelist for ICM from 1895 to 1899, before studying in Trinity College Dublin for ordination in the Church of Ireland. In 1903 he was ordained as Curate-assistant for St. Kevin's parish in Dublin, becoming its Rector in 1910 until 1919 when he became the Superintendent of ICM. He left ICM in 1936 for Australia to take up the post of Principal of Moore Theological College, Sydney. Hammond was a controversial figure both in Ireland and Australia as a member of the Orange Order, eventually rising to the position of Grand Master of the Orange Institution of New South Wales in 1961. In 2009, his involvement in establishing and sitting on the Managing Committee of the Bethany Home, a Protestant evangelical mother and baby home, was noted. The home is subject to ongoing calls to be added to the State redress scheme for victims of child abuse.

=== Orange Order ===
The Irish Church Missions claims no formal relationship with the Orange Order. The history section of the ICM website states that during the 19th century the organisation formally distanced itself from the Order, though a number of the Society's Scripture Readers were members. However, this distance appears hard to reconcile with the fact that in the twentieth century TC Hammond, Superintendent of the ICM, was a prominent member of the Order. An association can be traced from 1960s, through 2000 and beyond. Furthermore, the ICM traditionally hosted the annual service of the Dublin-Wicklow Orange Lodge's annual service each October. This practice may have declined since the ICM underwent internal reorganisation and dropped the words 'to the Roman Catholics' from its title. The Mission church on Bachelor's Walk was renamed the Immanuel Church Dublin. However, the ICM continued to receive financial donations from the Dublin-Wiclow and County Antrim Orange Lodges after the year 2000.

=== Child physical and sexual abuse ===
The Northern Ireland Historical Institutional Abuse Inquiry examined the evidence for physical and sexual abuse of children at Manor House Home, Lisburn, Northern Ireland, run by Irish Church Missions, from 1953, finding many serious failings.

==== Apology ====
On 11 March 2022 Northern Ireland Historical Institutional Abuse Inquiry confirmed physical and sexual abuse at the Manor House Home, run by ICM, and a public apology was issued in March 2022 in the Northern Ireland Assembly.

The six institutions that apologized for carrying out abuse were De La Salle Brothers, represented by Br Francis Manning; the Sisters of Nazareth, represented by Sr Cornelia Walsh; the Sisters of St Louis represented by Sr Uainin Clarke; the Good Shepherd Sisters, represented by Sr Cait O'Leary; Barnardo's in Northern Ireland, represented by Michele Janes; and Irish Church Missions, represented by Rev Mark Jones. In live reporting after the apology, BBC News reported that Jon McCourt from Survivors North West said "If what happened today was the best that the church could offer by way of an apology they failed miserably. There was no emotion, there was no ownership. ... I don't believe that the church and institutions atoned today." He called on the intuitions to "do the right thing" and contribute to the redress fund for survivors, saying that institutions have done similar for people in Scotland. McCourt praised the government ministers' apologies; they had "sat and thought out and listened to what it was we said.", but said that the institutions had failed to do this, leading to some victims having to leave the room while they were speaking, "compound[ing] the hurt." Others angry at the institutions' apologies included Caroline Farry, who attended St Joseph's Training School in Middletown from 1978 to 1981, overseen by nuns from the Sisters of St Louis, Pádraigín Drinan from Survivors of Abuse, and Alice Harper, whose brother, a victim of the De La Salle Brothers, had since died. Peter Murdock, from campaign group Savia, was at Nazareth Lodge Orphanage with his brother (who had recently died); he likened the institution to an "SS camp". He said "It's shocking to hear a nun from the institution apologising ... it comes 30 years too late ... people need to realise that it has to come from the heart. They say it came from the heart but why did they not apologise 30 years ago?"

== Stated positions ==
=== Homosexuality ===
Irish Church Missions maintains a traditionalist stance against homosexuality. The organisation opposed the Civil Partnership Bill, which granted limited civil recognition and rights in areas such as taxation and kinship to cohabiting same-sex and opposite-sex couples.

=== Ecumenism ===
Irish Church Missions maintains a stance against 'theological ecumenism'. The organisation has recently welcomed the framework announced by the Vatican for the transfer of certain groups of Anglo-Catholics as a means of advancing their aims. According to ICM, the move has demonstrated the futility of the theological ecumenical movement. It is the position of the organisation that evangelicalism has always held that there "is no squaring the theological circle".

ICM does however support 'practical ecumenism' with other religious communities in tackling social issues on which there is common ground.

=== The Church of Ireland ===
ICM is highly critical of the direction of its former church, accusing it of developing a liberal identity which they believe 'has nothing to offer Irish society'. The organisation has stated:

"According to its own foundational documents, the Church of Ireland is a Protestant church. Unfortunately, it's a Protestant church without a Protestant message."

=== Global Anglicanism ===
Irish Church Missions has been highly critical of the direction of the global Anglican Church, in particular the Archbishop of Canterbury.

According to a report in the ICM Magazine, ICM News:

Not only had these Anglican provinces ignored the pleas of the rest of the Anglican Communion to cease pursuing this unscriptural agenda, but there had been a manifest failure by the Anglican 'instruments of unity' (especially the Archbishop of Canterbury, the Anglican Consultative Council, and the Primates' meeting) to discipline them for it.

In December 2024 Irish Church Missions formally affiliated with the Anglican Convocation in Europe a diocese of the Global Anglican Futures Conference aligned Anglican Network in Europe.

== Notable people ==
- Revd. Alexander Dallas one of the ICM founders.
- Revd. Edward Bickersteth one of the ICM founders.
- Revd. T.C. Hammond served as superintendent of ICM from (1919 - 1936).
- Revd. Henry Lansdell English priest who served as secretary to the ICM (1869–79)
- Ellen Smyly ran a number of homes and orphanages for the Irish Church Missions.
- Hugh M'Neile preached at fundraisers for ICM in London.
- John Campbell Colquhoun Scottish writer and former MP, served as chairman of the ICM

== See also ==
- London Hibernian Society
- Irish Evangelical Society
- Irish Society for Promoting the Education of the Native Irish through the Medium of Their Own Language
- Association for the Discountenancing of Vice
