= Cavanaquill =

Townland in Templeport, County Cavan, Ireland

Coordinates: 54.1045°N 7.6323°W

Cavanaquill (from Irish Cabhán an Choill, meaning 'Hollow of the Hazel') is a townland in the civil parish of Templeport, County Cavan, Ireland. It lies in the Roman Catholic parish of Templeport and barony of Tullyhaw.

== Geography ==
Cavanaquill is bounded on the north by Urhannagh townland, on the west by Munlough South and Lissanover townlands, on the east by Killynaff townland and on the south by Tonyhallagh and Crossmakelagher townlands. Cavanaquill's chief geographical features are a small stream and cow pastures. It is traversed by rural lanes. The townland covers 102 statute acres.

== History ==
The Plantation of Ulster 1609 Baronial Map depicts the townland as Cavanekilly. The 1652 Commonwealth Survey lists the townland as Cavancuill. A deed dated 10 May 1744 spells the name as Cavanacull.

An 1808 map of ecclesiastical lands in Templeport depicts the townland as Cavanagh Hill.

In the Plantation of Ulster by grant dated 4 June 1611, along with other lands, King James VI and I granted one poll of Cavanaquill to Donill Backagh McShane O'Reyly, gentleman. He was a nephew of the O'Reilly Clan chief, Aodh Connallach mac Maolmhordha who ruled from 1565 to 1583. His genealogy is Domhnall Bacach son of Seaán son of Maol Mórdha (d. 1565) son of Seaán (d.1516) son of Cathal (d.1467) son of Eóghan na Fésóige (d.1449).

O'Reilly later sold the land to Walter Talbot of Ballyconnell. Walter Talbot died on 26 June 1625 at Ballyconnell and his son James Talbot succeeded to the Ballyconnell estate aged just 10 years. An Inquisition held in Cavan on 20 September 1630 found that James Talbot was seized of one poll of Cavanickehall, along with other lands. James Talbot married Helen Calvert, the daughter of George Calvert, 1st Baron Baltimore of Maryland, USA, in 1635. In the aftermath of the Irish Rebellion of 1641 James Talbot's estate was confiscated because he was a Catholic and he was granted an estate in 1655 at Castle Rubey, County Roscommon instead. He died in 1687. Talbot's land in Cavanaquill was distributed as follows-

The 1652 Commonwealth Survey lists the proprietor as being Lieutenant John Blackforde who also appears as proprietor for several other Templeport townlands in the same survey. His subsequent history can be found under the townland of Bofealan.

The 1790 Cavan Carvaghs list spells the townland name as Cavan Quill.

The Tithe Applotment Books for 1827 list twelve tithepayers in the townland.

The Cavanaquill Valuation Office Field books are available for December 1839.

Griffith's Valuation of 1857 lists five landholders in the townland.

== Census ==
Year	Population	Males	Females	Total Houses	Uninhabited
1841	34	15	19	5	0
1851	20	7	13	4	0
1861	22	8	14	4	0
1871	10	6	4	2	0
1881	9	7	2	2	0
1891	7	5	2	2	0

In the 1901 census of Ireland, there are two families listed in the townland, and in the 1911 census of Ireland, there are still two families listed in the townland.

== Antiquities ==
The 1836 Ordnance Survey Namebooks state- The remains of an old Danish fort.

The chief structure of historical interest in the townland is an earthen ringfort.
