= Sralahan =

Townland in County Cavan, Ireland

Sralahan or The Common is a townland in the Civil Parish of Tomregan but Roman Catholic Parish of Templeport, Barony of Tullyhaw, County Cavan, Ireland.

== Etymology ==
The townland name Sralahan is an anglicisation of the Gaelic placename "Srath Leathan", which means 'Broad River-meadow'. The reason why it is in two parishes and also why it is called 'The Common', is given in the Ordnance Survey papers of 1835 as follows "This land is extra-Parochial and it is not certain whether it belongs to Tomregan or Templeport Parishes. It was formerly a track of waste mountain and was claimed by no particular person, but of late years there has several poor people settled upon it and cultivated about 58 acres which produce oats and potatoes. They are however free from any rent, cess or tithe at the present time. There is a lawsuit at present concerning the townland which until settled it is a matter of doubt whether it belongs to the parishes of Templeport or Tomregan." [Desc. Rem.]. "This townland is given to Tomregan. See [Mr] Griffith minute 28 Augt 1835" [dúch dearg]"

== Geography ==
It is bounded on the north & east by Mullanacre Upper townland, on the south by Moher townland and on the west by Clontycarnaghan townland. Its chief geographical features are the Crooked River (Ireland) and Slieve Rushen mountain, on whose southern slope it lies, reaching an altitude of 1,120 feet above sea-level. The townland is traversed by some mountain lanes. Sralahan covers an area of 207 statute acres.

== History ==
It did not form part of any land grant in the Plantation of Ulster and is not shown on the early maps.

In 1833 one person in Sralahan was registered as a keeper of weapons- Peter Cassidy.

The Sralahan Valuation Office Field books are available for February 1840.

Griffith's Valuation of 1857 lists the landlord of the townland as Blashford & the tenants as Cassidy, Divine, Kelliher, Reilly, Donohoe and Armstrong.

== Census ==
Year	Population	Males	Females	Total Houses	Uninhabited
1841	50	31	19	9	0
1851	71	43	28	11	0
1861	60	34	26	9	0
1871	32	18	14	5	0
1881	27	16	11	6	0
1891	29	17	12	6	0

In the 1901 census of Ireland, there are seven families listed in the townland.

In the 1911 census of Ireland, there are seven families listed in the townland.

== Antiquities ==
There are no historic sites in the townland apart from some old stepping-stones across the river.
