= Clontycarnaghan =

Townland in Templeport, County Cavan, Ireland

Coordinates: 54.07514°N 7.810271°W

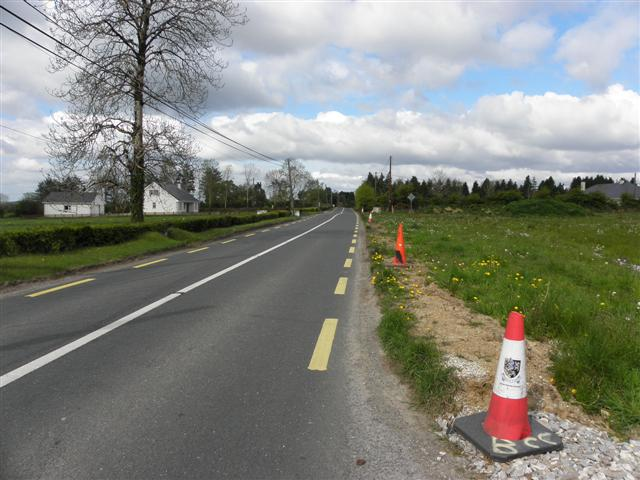
N87 road at Clontycarnaghan townland, Templeport, County Cavan, Ireland

Clontycarnaghan (from Irish Cluainte Chearnacháin, meaning 'Kernaghan’s Meadows') is a townland in the civil parish of Templeport, County Cavan, Ireland. It lies in the Roman Catholic parish of Templeport and barony of Tullyhaw.

== Geography ==
Clontycarnaghan is bounded on the north by Mullanacre Upper townland in Tomregan parish, on the west by Corneen and Munlough North townlands, on the south by Urhannagh and Bofealan townlands and on the east by Sralahan and Moher townlands in Tomregan parish. Its chief geographical features are Slieve Rushen mountain on whose southern slope it lies, the Crooked River, waterfalls, mountain bogs, forestry plantations, spring wells and dug wells. It forms part of the Slieve Rushen Bog Natural Heritage Area electronic Irish Statute Book (eISB). Clontycarnaghan is traversed by the national secondary N87 road (Ireland), minor roads and rural lanes. The townland covers 371 statute acres.

== History ==
In medieval times the McGovern barony of Tullyhaw was divided into economic taxation areas called ballibetoes, from the Irish Baile Biataigh (Anglicized as 'Ballybetagh'), meaning 'A Provisioner's Town or Settlement'. The original purpose was to enable the farmer, who controlled the baile, to provide hospitality for those who needed it, such as poor people and travellers. The ballybetagh was further divided into townlands farmed by individual families who paid a tribute or tax to the head of the ballybetagh, who in turn paid a similar tribute to the clan chief. The steward of the ballybetagh would have been the secular equivalent of the erenagh in charge of church lands. There were seven ballibetoes in the parish of Templeport. Clontycarnaghan was located in the ballybetagh of "Ballen Tulchoe" (alias 'Bally Tullagh'). The original Irish is Baile Tulach, meaning 'The Town of the Hillock')

Until the 19th century the modern townland of Corneen formed a sub-division of Clontycarnaghan.

The 1609 Ulster Plantation Baronial Map depicts the townland as Cloncarnagh.

The 1652 Commonwealth Survey spells the name as Cloontikarnaghan.

The 1665 Down Survey map depicts it as Carnagh.

William Petty's 1685 map depicts it as Carnagh.

From medieval times until 1606, the townland formed part of the lands owned by the McGovern (name) clan. Richard Tyrrell of Tyrrellspass, County Westmeath, purchased the townland c.1606 from Cormack McGovern, who was probably the son of Tomas Óg mac Brian Mág Samhradháin, who reigned as chief of the McGovern clan from 1584. A schedule, dated 31 July 1610, of the lands Tyrrell owned in Tullyhaw prior to the Ulster Plantation included: Clontecarnnechan, two cartronnes (a cartron was about 30 acres of arable land). In the Plantation of Ulster, Tyrrell swapped his lands in Clontycarnaghan for additional land in the barony of Tullygarvey where he lived at the time. In a grant dated 23 June 1610, along with other lands, King James VI and I then granted the townland as: two polls of Clonekarnehan to Callo O'Gowne, gentleman.

The O'Gowne lands in Clontycarnaghan were confiscated in the Cromwellian Act for the Settlement of Ireland 1652 and were distributed as follows-

The 1652 Commonwealth Survey lists the proprietor as Thomas Thornton and the tenant as Hugh O'Backaghan.

In the Hearth Money Rolls compiled on 29 September 1663 there were two Hearth Tax payers in Clunticarnagh- William Mathers and Walter Rice.

A grant dated 3 November 1666 was made by King Charles II of England to Sir Tristram Beresford, 1st Baronet which included, inter alia, the lands of Clantacannagh. By grant dated 11 September 1670 from King Charles II of England to said Sir Tristram Beresford, the said lands of Clantacannagh were included in the creation of a new Manor of Beresford.

The 1790 Cavan Carvaghs list spells the name as Clontecarnahan.

The Tithe Applotment Books for 1827 (which spell it Clintecarnahan) list sixteen tithepayers in the townland.

The Clontycarnaghan Valuation Office Field books are available for December 1839.

Griffith's Valuation of 1857 lists twenty four landholders in the townland.

== Census ==
Year	Population	Males	Females	Total Houses	Uninhabited
1841	121	50	71	22	2
1851	72	36	36	21	2
1861	104	45	59	19	1
1871	87	45	42	16	0
1881	80	43	37	17	0
1891	69	30	39	16	0

In the 1901 census of Ireland, there are sixteen families listed in the townland, and in the 1911 census of Ireland, there are seventeen families listed in the townland.

== Antiquities ==
The only structures of historical interest in the townland appear to be footsticks and footbridges over the Crooked River.
