= James Thorburn =

James Thorburn may refer to:

- James Thorburn (physician) (1830–1905), Canadian physician and professor
- James Thorburn (colonial administrator) (1864–1929), British colonial administrator
