= Mullanacre Upper =

Townland in County Cavan, Ireland

Mullanacre Upper is a townland in the Parish of Tomregan, Barony of Tullyhaw, County Cavan, Ireland.

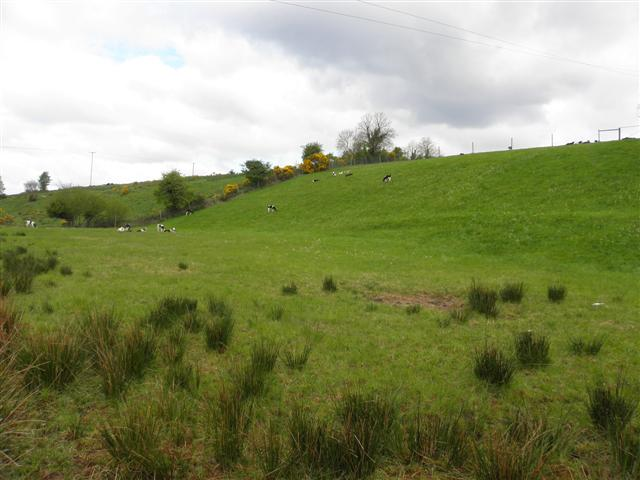
Mullanacre Townland (geograph 1853902)

== Etymology ==
The townland name is an anglicisation of the Gaelic placename "Mullagh an Acre" which means ‘The Acre of the Summit’. In the 17th century it formed part of Carrowmore, County Cavan townland.

== Geography ==
It is bounded on the north by Legavreagra townland, on the east by Carrowmore, County Cavan townland, on the south by Mullanacre Lower townland and on the west by Clontycarnaghan, Corneen, Gortnavreeghan, Brackley, Templeport, Mullaghlea, Finaghoo, Cullion (Kinawley), Sralahan and Aghakinnigh townlands. Its chief geographical features are Loughan Macmartin mountain lake, Miles’ Lough mountain lake, the Crooked River (Ireland), forestry plantations and Slieve Rushen mountain, on whose southern slope it lies, reaching an altitude of 1,324 feet (404 m) above sea-level. It forms part of the Slieve Rushen Bog Natural Heritage Area. The townland is traversed by minor lanes. The townland covers an area of 552 statute acres, including 1-acre (4,000 m^{2}) of water.

== History ==
It formed part of the Manor of Calva which was granted to Walter Talbot in 1610 as part of the Plantation of Ulster. George Montgomery the estate owner died in 1841 and his estate went to his Enery cousins of Bawnboy. In 1856 they sold the estate to take advantage of its increased value owing to the opening of the Woodford Canal through the town in the same year. The estate, including Mullinacre Upper, was split up among different purchasers and maps & details of previous leases of the sold parts are still available.

The Tithe Applotment Books for 1827 list the following tithepayers in the townland- Henderson, Patterson.

The Ordnance Survey Name Books for 1836 give the following description of the townland- Mullan-acre Upper which means 'acre of the summit'. This in old times was part of Carramore. North-west of parish. Property of Montgomery. Only 5 acres are arable, the rest are mountain. No house nor road. Substratum limestone.

The Mullanacre Upper Valuation Office Field books are available for February 1840.

A deed dated 1 April 1854 now in the Cavan Archives Service (ref P017/0063) is described as-

Lease made between William Hamilton Enery, Ballyconnell House, County Cavan, esquire, and Owen Magauran, Carramore, County Cavan, in respect of part of the lands of Mullanacre Upper (Mullinacree Upper), parish of Tomregan, barony of Tullyhaw, County Cavan. Bounded on the north by the large mountain, on the south by the river separating it from Moher, on the east by the river separating it from Carramore and on the west by the road leading to the mountain. Contains 20 acres late Irish plantation measure. Lease to run for the natural lives of Victoria Adelaide Mary Louisa, Princess Royal of England, and Albert Edward, Prince of Wales, or term of 31 years, whichever is longer. Annual rent of £3 sterling. Magauran covenants to do suit and service at the Manor of Gwyllym Brooke and perform all lawful customs associated with the Manor.

Griffith's Valuation of 1857 lists the landlords of the townland as the Annesley Estate and Netterfield & the tenants as Armstrong, Reilly, Henderson, Kelliher & McGovern.

== Census ==
| Year | Population | Males | Females | Total Houses | Uninhabited |
|---|---|---|---|---|---|
| 1841 | 49 | 27 | 22 | 10 | 0 |
| 1851 | 53 | 27 | 26 | 9 | 0 |
| 1861 | 40 | 17 | 23 | 8 | 0 |
| 1871 | 9 | 4 | 5 | 1 | 0 |
| 1881 | 7 | 3 | 4 | 2 | 1 |
| 1891 | 5 | 2 | 3 | 2 | 1 |

In the 1901 census of Ireland, there are two families listed in the townland.

In the 1911 census of Ireland, there are two families listed in the townland.

== Antiquities ==
There are no historic sites in the townland.
