= Moher =

Townland in County Cavan, Ireland

Coordinates: 54°7′12″N 7°37′36″W

- Townland
- Interactive map of Moher
- Country: Ireland
- Province: Ulster
- County: Cavan
- Barony: Tullyhaw
- Parish: Tomregan

Area
  - Total: 88 ha (218 acres)
- Elevation: 180 m (600 ft)
- Time zone: UTC+0 (GMT)
  - Summer (DST): UTC+1 (IST)

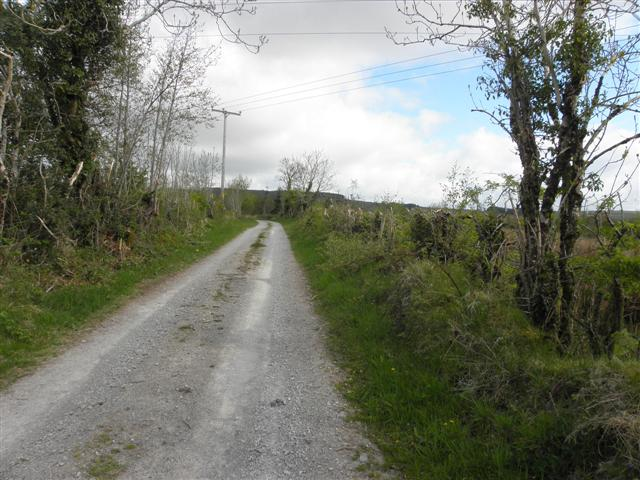
Road at Moher townland, Tomregan, County Cavan, Ireland, heading north

Moher is a townland in the Parish of Tomregan, Barony of Tullyhaw, County Cavan, Ireland.

== Etymology ==
The townland name is an anglicisation of the Gaelic placename "Mothar" which means 'A cluster of trees'. In the 17th century it formed part of Carrowmore townland.

== Geography ==
It is bounded on the north by Sralahan townland, on the east by Mullanacre Lower townland, on the south by Bofealan townland and on the west by Clontycarnaghan townland. Its chief geographical features are the Crooked River (Ireland) and Slieve Rushen mountain, on whose southern slope it lies, reaching an altitude of 600 feet above sea-level. The townland is traversed by the N87 road (Ireland), the Bawnboy Road and other minor lanes. The townland covers an area of 218 statute acres.

== History ==
It formed part of the Manor of Calva which was granted to Walter Talbot in 1610 as part of the Plantation of Ulster and descended with the rest of the Ballyconnell estate. George Montgomery the estate owner died in 1841 and his estate went to his Enery cousins of Bawnboy. In 1856 they sold the estate to take advantage of its increased value owing to the opening of the Woodford Canal through the town in the same year. The estate, including Moher, was split up among different purchasers and maps and details of previous leases of the sold parts are still available.

The Tithe Applotment Books for 1827 list the following tithepayers in the townland- McCanly, Reilly, Gaffney, Griffith, McGauran, Henderson, Curry.

The Ordnance Survey Name Books for 1836 give the following description of the townland- Mothar, 'a cluster of trees'. Property of Montgomery. 45 acres of bog and mountain pasture. Gravelly soil on limestone. Old and new roads to Ballyconnell. Produces oats, flax and potatoes.

The Moher Valuation Office Field books are available for February 1840.

Griffiths Valuation of 1857 lists the following tenants in the townland- Baxter, Henderson, Kelliher, Kellett, McGovern, Murray, Reilly, Rudden.

== Census ==
Year	Population	Males	Females	Total houses	Uninhabited
1841	96	46	50	21	1
1851	73	39	34	16	0
1861	59	35	24	12	0
1871	47	29	18	10	0
1881	42	19	23	11	0
1891	41	17	24	9	0

In the 1901 census of Ireland, there are thirteen families listed in the townland.

In the 1911 census of Ireland, there are nine families listed in the townland.

== Antiquities ==
There are no known historic sites in the townland.
