= Mullanacre Lower =

Townland in Tomregan, County Cavan, Ireland

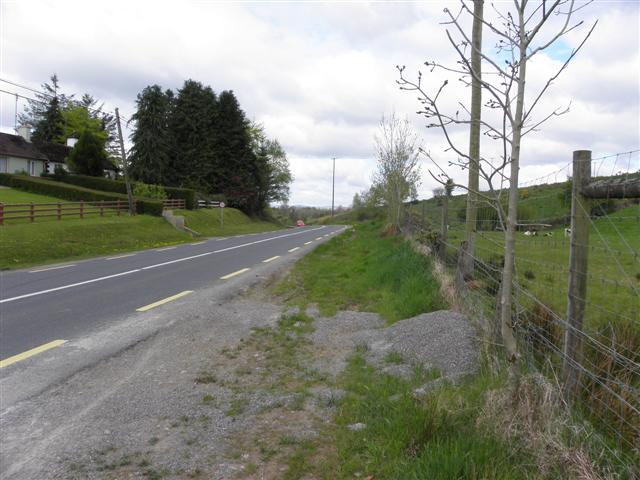
Road at Mullanacre Lower townland, Tomregan, County Cavan, Ireland, heading west.

Mullanacre Lower is a townland in the Parish of Tomregan, Barony of Tullyhaw, County Cavan, Ireland.

== Etymology ==
The townland name is an anglicisation of the Gaelic placename "Mullagh an Acre" which means 'The Acre of the Summit'. In the 17th century it formed part of Carrowmore, County Cavan townland. The earliest surviving spelling dates from 1761: Mullaneacre.

== Geography ==
It is bounded on the north by Mullanacre Upper townland, on the east by Carrowmore, County Cavan townland, on the south by Drumane & Bofealan townlands and on the west by Moher townland. Its chief geographical features are the Crooked River (Ireland) and Slieve Rushen mountain, on whose southern slope it lies, reaching an altitude of over 600 feet (180 m) above sea-level. The townland is traversed by the N87 road (Ireland), Carrowmore Lane and other minor lanes. The townland covers 315 statute acres, including 1-acre (4,000 m^{2}) of water.

== History ==
The townland formed part of the Manor of Calva which was granted to Walter Talbot in 1610 as part of the Plantation of Ulster and descended with the rest of the Ballyconnell estate. George Montgomery the estate owner died in 1841 and his estate went to his Enery cousins of Bawnboy. In 1856 they sold the estate to take advantage of its increased value owing to the opening of the Woodford Canal through the town in the same year. The estate, including Mullinacre Lower, was split up among different purchasers and maps & details of previous leases of the sold parts are still available.

In the Cavan Poll Book of 1761, there was one person registered to vote in Mullanacre in the Irish general election, 1761: Robert Henderson. He was entitled to cast two votes. The four election candidates were Charles Coote, 1st Earl of Bellomont and Lord Newtownbutler (later Brinsley Butler, 2nd Earl of Lanesborough), both of whom were then elected Member of Parliament for Cavan County. The losing candidates were George Montgomery (MP) of Ballyconnell and Barry Maxwell, 1st Earl of Farnham. Absence from the poll book either meant a resident did not vote or, more likely, was not a freeholder entitled to vote, which would mean most of the inhabitants of Mullanacre.

A deed dated 23 December 1811 now in the Cavan Archives Service (ref P017/0028) is described as-

Lease made between Henry John Clements, Ashfield lodge, esquire, and Hannah Story, Ballyconnell House, County Cavan, widow, committees of George Montgomery, Ballyconnell, County Cavan, esquire, a lunatic, and with the consent of Thomas, Lord Manners, Lord High Chancellor of Ireland, of the first part, the said George Montgomery, of the second part, and Thomas Patterson, Mullinacre, County Cavan, of the third part. Lease made in respect of that part of the town and lands of Mullanacre (Mullinacre) containing 33 acres and 3 roods. Lease to run for the natural lives of Princess Charlotte Augusta Caroline, daughter of George, Prince of Wales, and William Whittendale, aged 9 years, third son of Thomas Whittendale of Gortmoylan, county Fermanagh. Annual rent of £33.15.0 sterling. Tenant covenants to grind all corn, grain, meal and malt used and grown on the premises at Ballyconnell Mill. Penalty of 5 shillings per bushel ground elsewhere.

A deed dated 7 January 1851 now in the Cavan Archives Service (ref P017/0058) is described as-

Lease made between William Hamilton Enery, Ballyconnell House, County Cavan, esquire, and John Henderson, Mullinacre Lower, County Cavan, farmer, in respect of part of the town and lands of Mullanacre Lower (Mullinacre Lower), barony of Tullyhaw, County Cavan, containing 24 acres late Irish plantation measure. Lease to run for the natural lives of Victoria Adelaide Mary Louisa, Princess Royal of England, and Albert Edward, Prince of Wales. Annual rent of £12 sterling. Henderson covenants that he will do suit and service at the Court of the Manor of Gwyllym Brooke and pay the seneschal thereof fees and perform all customs of the Manor.

The Tithe Applotment Books for 1827 list the following tithepayers in the townland- Henderson, Hewitt, McCabe, Donahey.

The Ordnance Survey Name Books for 1836 give the following description of the townland- South-west of parish. This in old times was part of Carramore. Property of Montgomery. Rent 16 shillings to £1 per arable acre. 70 acres of mountain and pasture. Sandy soil. A Danish fort, 2 quarries. Poor natives. Old and new roads.

The Mullanacre Lower Valuation Office Field books are available for 1840.

Griffith's Valuation of 1857 lists the landlord of the townland as the Annesley Estate & the tenants as Donohoe, McBrien, Henderson, Graham, Reilly, McKiernan, Armstrong, McGovern, Kelliher and Annesley.

In the Dúchas Folklore Collection there is a description of Mullanacre in 1938.

== Census ==
Year	Population	Males	Females	Total Houses	Uninhabited
1841	23	13	10	4	0
1851	18	9	9	4	0
1861	33	20	13	6	0
1871	56	28	28	11	0
1881	53	30	23	11	0
1891	69	40	29	12	0

In the 1901 census of Ireland, there are fourteen families listed in the townland.

In the 1911 census of Ireland, there are eleven families listed in the townland.

== Antiquities ==
1. A medieval earthen ringfort south of the Bawnboy Road, (Site number 1019, page 128, Mullanacre Lower townland, in "Archaeological Inventory of County Cavan", Patrick O’Donovan, 1995, where it is described as- Raised circular area (int. dims. 29.2m E-W; 27.5m N-S) enclosed by a low earthen bank and a largely infilled fosse abutted by a modern field boundary from E-S-NW. Break in bank at E probably represents original entrance).
2. Old quarries.
