= Margaret Catherine Blaikie =

Scottish temperance activist (1823–1915)

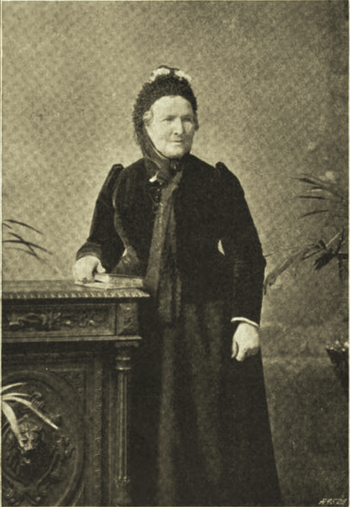
- Born: Margaret Catharine Biggar; 6 December 1823; Banff, Aberdeenshire, Scotland
- Died: 25 July 1915 (aged 91); North Berwick, Scotland
- Occupation: social reformer
- Years active: 1871–1906
- Known for: Scottish temperance movement
- Spouse: William Garden Blaikie (m. 1845; died 1899)
- Children: Walter Biggar Blaikie
- Relatives: George Duff

Margaret Catherine Blaikie (née, Biggar; 6 December 1823 – 25 July 1915) was a Scottish temperance reformer. She became the long-standing president (for 29 years) of the Scottish Christian Union (a women's temperance group, independent but associated with the British Women's Temperance Association) and was involved with the Women's Foreign Missionary Society.

== Early life and education ==
Margaret Catharine Biggar was born at Banff, Aberdeenshire, Scotland, December 6, 1823. Her father was Walter Biggar (1787–1867), a merchant. Her mother, Ann Duff (1784–1876), belonged to a Banffshire family of the same line as the Duke of Fife. Her uncle, Captain George Duff, died at the Battle of Trafalgar, beside Nelson. A monument was erected to his memory in the Nelson crypt of St Paul's Cathedral.

She was educated at home by a governess. In 1841, she removed to Edinburgh with her parents.

== Career ==
For many years, after her 1845 marriage to William Garden Blaikie of Edinburgh, her time was taken up with family responsibilities. It was not until her children were reared that Blaikie entered into public work, for 21 years, conducting a weekly prayer meeting for mothers.

"My mother became a total abstainer in the hope that her example would influence the poor people in Banff, amongst whom she laboured. But although I have been in favour of temperance all my life, it was not until about twenty years ago that Dr. Blaikie and I came publicly forward as total abstainers. You known that I always work in conjunction with my husband." -Margaret Blaikie (1895)

In 1870, she visited Canada and came into contact with Annie MacPherson. Influenced by MacPherson's emigration work, Blaikie decided to start something of a similar character on her return to Edinburgh. The result was the Emigration Home for Destitute Children in Lauriston Lane, Edinburgh. During the period of 1871–91, Mr. and Mrs. Blaikie "rescued" 700 children from the families of "destitute drunks" and re-homed 300 of these to Canada.

Her interest in church work and in the temperance question in particular led to her selection as president of the Scottish Christian Union, one of the affiliated societies of the British Women's Temperance Association, on the formation of that body in 1877, and she continued to hold that position until the infirmities of age compelled her resignation in 1906.

She was the first president of the Free Church of Scotland Manse Ladies' Temperance Association, formed in 1884, and became one of the two president of the United Free Church of Scotland Manse Ladies' Temperance Association, when the two churches (United Presbyterian and the Free Church of Scotland) united in 1900. On her retirement from active service in 1906, she was made honorary president, and she continued to hold this position until her death.

== Personal life ==
She married William Garden Blaikie in 1845, at the time when he was minister of the Free Church of Scotland at Pilrig, a suburb of Edinburgh. Their children included Walter Biggar Blaikie, engineer, printer and astronomer, and Robert Henry Blaikie (1857–1933), a surgeon, as well as James, William, Anne, Jane, John, Alfred, Alice, Charles, Alan, Margaret, and two infants who died in their first year.

Margaret Catherine Blaikie died at North Berwick, Scotland, 25 July 1915. James Silvester published her biography, Margaret C. Blaikie. The Story of a Strenuous Life, in 1930.
