= Urhannagh =

Townland in the civil parish of Templeport, County Cavan, Ireland

Coordinates: 54.1096°N 7.6285°W

- Townland
- Interactive map of Urhannagh
- Country: Ireland

Urhannagh (from Irish Uaránach, meaning 'Abounding in wells or cold springs') is a townland in the civil parish of Templeport, County Cavan, Ireland. It lies in the Roman Catholic parish of Templeport and barony of Tullyhaw.

== Geography ==
Urhannagh is bounded on the north by Clontycarnaghan townland, on the west by Munlough North townland, on the east by Bofealan townland and on the south by Cavanaquill and Killynaff townlands. Its chief geographical features are a small stream and cow pastures. Urhannagh is traversed by rural lanes. The townland covers 68 statute acres.

== History ==
In medieval times the McGovern barony of Tullyhaw was divided into economic taxation areas called ballibetoes, from the Irish Baile Biataigh (Anglicized as Ballybetagh), meaning 'A Provisioner's Town or Settlement'. The original purpose was to enable the farmer, who controlled the baile, to provide hospitality for those who needed it, such as poor people and travellers. The ballybetagh was further divided into townlands farmed by individual families who paid a tribute or tax to the head of the ballybetagh, who in turn paid a similar tribute to the clan chief. The steward of the ballybetagh would have been the secular equivalent of the erenagh in charge of church lands. There were seven ballibetoes in the parish of Templeport. Urhannagh was located in the ballybetagh of "Ballen Tulchoe" (alias 'Bally Tullagh'). The original Irish is Baile Tulach, meaning 'The Town of the Hillock')

The 1609 Ulster Plantation Baronial Map depicts the townland as Doorawnagh. A 1630 Inquisition spells it Dowerhannagh. The 1652 Commonwealth Survey spells the name as Urgawnagh. The 1665 Down Survey map depicts it as Unshonagh.

From medieval times until 1606, the townland formed part of the lands owned by the McGovern (name) clan. Richard Tyrrell of Tyrrellspass, County Westmeath, purchased the townland circa 1606 from Cormack McGovern, who was probably the son of Tomas Óg mac Brian Mág Samhradháin, who reigned as chief of the McGovern clan from 1584. A schedule, dated 31 July 1610, of the lands Tyrrell owned in Tullyhaw prior to the Ulster Plantation included: Nwrhavnagh, one cartron (a cartron was about 30 acres of arable land).

During the Plantation of Ulster, Tyrrell swapped his lands in Urhannagh for additional land in the barony of Tullygarvey where he lived at the time. In a grant dated 23 June 1610, along with other lands, King James VI and I then granted the townland as: Doorhawraght, 1 poll, to Shane McCabee, gent. Shane McCabe then sold the townland to Walter Talbot of Ballyconnell who died on 26 June 1625 and his son James Talbot succeeded to the Ballyconnell estate aged just 10 years. An Inquisition held in Cavan on 20 September 1630 found that James Talbot was seized of one poll of Dowerhannagh, along with other lands. In 1635, James Talbot married Helen Calvert, the daughter of George Calvert, 1st Baron Baltimore of Maryland. During the Cromwellian Act for the Settlement of Ireland 1652, Talbot's estate was confiscated because he was a Catholic and he was granted an estate in 1655 at Castle Rubey, County Roscommon instead. He died in 1687. Talbot's land in Urhannagh was redistributed.

The 1652 Commonwealth Survey lists the proprietor as being Lieutenant John Blackforde, who also appears as proprietor of several other Templeport townlands in the same survey. John Blachford was born in 1598 in Ashmore, Dorset, England, the son of Richard and Frances Blachford. He became a merchant in Dorchester, Dorset but fled to France in 1633 when facing a warrant from the Exchequer for not paying customs. He married Mary Renald from Devon and died at Lissanover, County Cavan in 1661 and was buried at St. Orvins in Dublin (probably St. Audoen's Church, Dublin) despite wishing to be buried back in Dorchester. His will was published on 9 January 1665 leaving his son John Blachford as his sole heir. An Inquisition held in Cavan on 21 May 1667 found that his widow, Mary Blachford, and his heir John, were seized of, inter alia, the land of Urhunaght alias Unshonagh alias Doorhawnaght. He had four sons: John, Thomas, Ambrose and William (who became a Major) and two daughters, Mary and Frances. Major William Blachford was born in 1658 and died at Lissanover on 28 March 1727. The Blachford family gravestones in Templeport Church read as follows- This monument was erected by MAJOR WILLIAM / BLASHFORD of Lisnover in 1721 to the memory of / his father, JOHN BLASHFORD, late of the same Esqr. but / from Dorchester in Dorsetshire, the place of his / nativity, who in his lifetime chose this for a burying / place, for himself and family, but died in Dublin / was buried in St. Orvins Church but his wife, MARY / RENALD of a Devonsheire family is buried here / as also three sons and two daughters, viz JOHN / AMBROSE AND THOMAS; MARY AND FRANCES / Here likewise lies buried two wives of MAJOR WILLIAM BLASHFORD, son to the said JOHN BLASHFORD viz / MARY MAGHEE of an ancient Family in Lincolnsheire. CORNET CHIDLEY BLACHFORD, son to MAJOR WILLIAM BLACHFORD, leys buried here who dyed August ye 29th, 1722. This aboue MAJOR WILLIAM BLACHFORD. / That erected this monument, died the 28th of March 1727, aged 69 years.

A deed dated 10 May 1744 spells the name as Urenagh. The 1790 Cavan Carvaghs list spells the name as Urhannagh.

The Tithe Applotment Books for 1827 list four tithepayers in the townland.

The Urhannagh Valuation Office Field books are available for December 1839.

Griffith's Valuation (1857) lists three landholders in the townland.

The Kells family lived in the townland for about 200 years.

== Census ==
Year	Population	Males	Females	Total Houses	Uninhabited
1841	22	12	10	3	0
1851	19	14	5	2	0
1861	12	8	4	2	0
1871	9	5	4	3	0
1881	11	5	6	2	0
1891	11	4	7	2	0

In the 1901 census of Ireland, there are three families listed in the townland, and in the 1911 census of Ireland, there are two listed in the townland.

== Antiquities ==
There seem to be no sites of historical interest in the townland.
