= Philip Crampton Smyly (surgeon) =

Irish surgeon and laryngologist

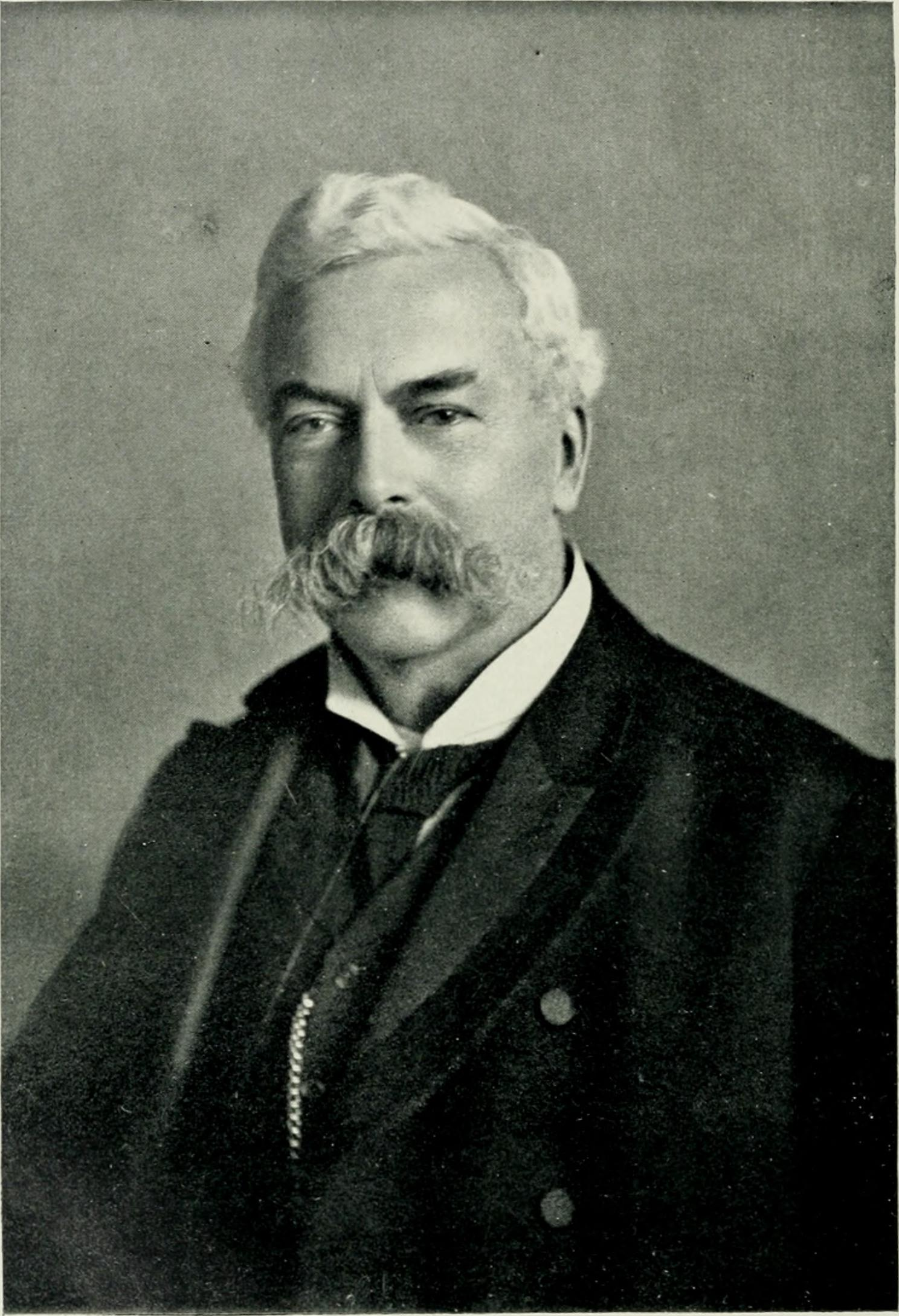
Philip Crampton Smyly

Sir Philip Crampton Smyly BA MB FRCSI (1838–1904), was Surgeon-in-Ordinary to Queen Victoria in Ireland until her death, and honorary surgeon to King Edward. He was president of the Laryngological Association of Great Britain in 1889, of the Irish Medical Association in 1900, and of the Irish Medical Schools and Graduates' Association in 1902. He was consulting surgeon to the Hospital for Diseases of the Throat and Ear, the Children's Hospital, Harcourt Street, and the Rotunda Hospital Dublin.

== Personal life ==
Born in Ely Place, Dublin in 1838 to the Surgeon Josiah Smyly F.R.C.S.I. (1803–1864) and the philanthropist Ellen Smyly (1815–1901), he was educated at Trinity College, Dublin, and the Royal College of Surgeons. He was licensed by the Irish College of Physicians. In 1864 he married Hon. Selina Marina Plunket, daughter of the 3rd Baron Plunket; their son was the judge and colonial administrator also Sir Philip Crampton Smyly (1866–1953).

Smyly died in Merrion Square, Dublin in 1904, and is buried in Mount Jerome Cemetery, Dublin.
