= Killynaff =

Townland in the civil parish of Templeport, County Cavan, Ireland

Coordinates: 54.07514°N 7.810271°W

Killynaff (from Irish Coill na ndamh, meaning 'Wood of the Oxen') is a townland in the civil parish of Templeport, County Cavan, Ireland. It lies in the Roman Catholic parish of Templeport and barony of Tullyhaw.

== Geography ==
Killynaff is bounded on the north by Urhannagh, Bofealan and Drumane townlands, on the west by Cavanaquill and Crossmakelagher townlands and on the southeast by Lecharrownahone townland. Its chief geographical features are cow pastures. Killynaff is traversed by a minor road and rural lanes. The townland covers 133 statute acres.

== History ==
In medieval times the McGovern barony of Tullyhaw was divided into economic taxation areas called ballibetoes, from the Irish Baile Biataigh (Anglicized as 'Ballybetagh'), meaning 'A Provisioner's Town or Settlement'. The original purpose was to enable the farmer, who controlled the baile, to provide hospitality for those who needed it, such as poor people and travellers. The ballybetagh was further divided into townlands farmed by individual families who paid a tribute or tax to the head of the ballybetagh, who in turn paid a similar tribute to the clan chief. The steward of the ballybetagh would have been the secular equivalent of the erenagh in charge of church lands. There were seven ballibetoes in the parish of Templeport. Killynaff was located in the ballybetagh of "Ballen Tulchoe" (alias Bally Tullagh). The original Irish is Baile Tulach, meaning Town of the Hillock.

The 1609 Baronial Map depicts the townland as Killenaw. A 1610 grant spells it as Killenenawe. A 1630 Inquisition spells it as Killnenawe. The 1652 Commonwealth Survey spells the name as Kilnenaffe. The 1665 Down Survey map depicts it as Killinought.

During the Plantation of Ulster by grant dated 23 June 1610, along with other lands forming the Manor of Calva, King James VI and I granted one poll of Killenenawe to Hugh Culme. In the same year Culme surrendered his interest to Walter Talbot of Ballyconnell. Talbot died on 26 June 1625 and his son James Talbot succeeded to the Ballyconnell estate aged just 10 years. An Inquisition held in Cavan on 20 September 1630 found that James Talbot was seized of one poll of Killnenawe, along with other lands. In 1635 James Talbot married Helen Calvert, the daughter of George Calvert, 1st Baron Baltimore of Maryland.

In the Cromwellian Act for the Settlement of Ireland 1652, Talbot's estate was confiscated because he was a Catholic and he was granted an estate in 1655 at Castle Rubey, County Roscommon instead. He died in 1687. Talbot's land in Killynaff was redistributed to John Blachford, who obtained Killynaff after the Cromwellian settlement. The 1652 Commonwealth Survey lists the proprietor being Lieutenant John Blackforde and the tenant being Gilleesaog O'Rely, both of whom appear as proprietor and tenant for several other Templeport townlands in the same survey, such as Bofealan. In the Hearth Money Rolls compiled on 29 September 1663 there were three Hearth Tax payers in Killinagh- Brian McKernan, Teige McKernan and Neale McFely.

John Blachford was born in 1598 in Ashmore, Dorset, England, the son of Richard and Frances Blachford. He became a merchant in Dorchester, Dorset but fled to France in 1633 when facing a warrant from the Exchequer for not paying customs. He married Mary Renald from Devon and died at Lissanover, County Cavan in 1661 and was buried at St. Orvins in Dublin (probably St. Audoen's Church, Dublin (Church of Ireland)) despite wishing to be buried back in Dorchester. His will was published on 9 January 1665 leaving his son John Blachford as his sole heir. An Inquisition held in Cavan on 21 May 1667 found that his widow Mary Blachford and his heir John were seized of, inter alia, the land of Kellenaw alias Killenaught. He had sons John, Thomas, Ambrose and William (who became a Major) and daughters Mary and Frances. Major William Blachford was born in 1658 and died at Lissanover on 28 March 1727. The Blachford family gravestones in Templeport Church read as follows- This monument was erected by MAJOR WILLIAM / BLASHFORD of Lisnover in 1721 to the memory of / his father, JOHN BLASHFORD, late of the same Esqr. but / from Dorchester in Dorsetshire, the place of his / nativity, who in his lifetime chose this for a burying / place, for himself and family, but died in Dublin / was buried in St. Orvins Church but his wife, MARY / RENALD of a Devonsheire family is buried here / as also three sons and two daughters, viz JOHN / AMBROSE AND THOMAS; MARY AND FRANCES / Here likewise lies buried two wives of MAJOR WILLIAM BLASHFORD, son to the said JOHN BLASHFORD viz / MARY MAGHEE of an ancient Family in Lincolnsheire. CORNET CHIDLEY BLACHFORD, son to MAJOR WILLIAM BLACHFORD, leys buried here who dyed August ye 29th, 1722. This aboue MAJOR WILLIAM BLACHFORD. / That erected this monument, died the 28th of March 1727, aged 69 years.

A deed dated 13 Nov 1738 includes: Lord Angleseys part of Killenoph.

The 1790 Cavan Carvaghs list spells the name as Kilnenagh.

The Tithe Applotment Books for 1827 list nine tithepayers in the townland.

The Killynaff Valuation Office Field books are available for 1839-1841.

Griffith's Valuation of 1857 lists five landholders in the townland.

The Kells family have lived in the townland for about 300 years.

== Census ==
Year	Population	Males	Females	Total Houses	Uninhabited
1841	65	26	39	10	1
1851	46	20	26	8	1
1861	44	23	21	6	0
1871	20	10	10	5	0
1881	18	10	8	4	0
1891	15	10	5	4	0

In the 1901 census of Ireland, there are eleven families listed in the townland, and in the 1911 census of Ireland, there are five families listed in the townland.

== Antiquities ==
There seem to be no sites of historical interest in the townland.
