= Congregational Union of Ireland =

The Congregational Union of Ireland is strongly associated with the Puritans and Oliver Cromwell. The Irish Congregational Church was formed in 1829. In 1899 it absorbed the Irish Evangelical Society. By 1927 there were about 10,000 members in Ireland.

The denomination affirms the Savoy Declaration.

It has close contacts with the Evangelical Fellowship of Congregational Churches.

Church membership is around 3,200 in 26 congregations. Most members are in Northern Ireland; the Republic of Ireland census of 2016 enumerated 68 Congregationalists.

The chairman is Rev. Nigel Kissing.
