= Annie MacPherson =

Scottish evangelical Quaker and philanthropist

Annie Parlane MacPherson (1833 – 27 November 1904) was a Scottish evangelical Quaker and philanthropist who founded Home Children, which sent poor and orphaned children to Canada and other colonies.

== Biography ==
She was born in Campsie, by Milton, Stirlingshire, and educated in Glasgow and at the Home and Colonial Training College in Gray's Inn Road, London. After her father died, she moved to Cambridge, but soon after, returned to London. Touched by the poverty in the East End of London in 1868, she opened the Home of Industry at 60 Commercial Road in Spitalfield.

She influenced members of the Scottish Christian Union, a temperance association of women, independent but affiliated to the British Women's Temperance Association, such as Mary White and Anne Bryson, who took her ideas back to influence women activists in Glasgow, and Margaret Catherine Blaikie, who established the Emigration Home for Destitute Children in Lauriston Lane, Edinburgh.

In the 1870s, she organised for Home children to be sent to Canada from her home in London, and also had arrangements with Dr Barnardo's Homes in London, Quarriers homes in Scotland, and Smyly homes in Dublin, Ireland similar to arrangements with English and Scottish homes.

In Canada, she had set up a number of Homes, Marchmont, Galt in Ontario and in Knowlton, Quebec

The Doyle Report of 1875 into the emigration of children from these homes cast a shadow over the process of exporting children although it acknowledged the benevolent motives of MacPherson and others. Her sister, Louisa MacPherson, married Charles Henry Birt, and helped her sister in her mission.

In 1873, she established a home in Liverpool called The Sheltering Home.

MacPherson died in 1904.
