= Henry Joseph Monck Mason =

Irish writer

Henry Joseph Monk Mason
- Born: 15 July 1778; Powerscourt, County Wicklow, Ireland
- Died: April 14, 1858 (aged 79); Bray, County Wicklow
- Known for: Essay on the Antiquity and Constitution of Parliaments in Ireland, Dublin, 1820

Henry Joseph Monk Mason (15 July 1778 – 14 April 1858) was an Irish writer who, although not a native speaker, specialised in Irish-language activities. He was a founder of The Irish Society, dedicated to spreading the Scripture in Irish, and a campaigner for prison reform.

== Life ==
He was born at Powerscourt, County Wicklow, the son of Lieutenant-colonel Henry Monck Mason of Kildare Street, Dublin, by his second wife, Jane, only daughter of Bartholomew Mosse, M.D. After attending schools at Portarlington and Dublin he entered Trinity College, Dublin in 1793, was elected scholar in 1796, and on graduating B.A. in 1798 was awarded the gold medal. At college he was contemporary with Thomas Moore the poet, and afterwards met him during visits to Kilkenny.

In 1800 he was called to the Irish bar, but did not seek practice. Instead he held the post of examiner to the prerogative court. In 1814 he was appointed assistant librarian of King's Inns, and became chief librarian in 1815.

In conjunction with Bishop Daly, Mason founded, in 1818, the "Irish Society for Promoting the Education of the Native Irish through the Medium of Their Own Language". He acted as its secretary for many years, besides writing several tracts in furtherance of its objectives. The same year he assisted in organising an association for the improvement of prisons and of prison discipline in Ireland, and in 1819 he wrote a pamphlet on the objects of the association. He likewise visited the prisons with a view to reclaiming first offenders.

In 1851 Mason resigned the librarianship of King's Inns, and gave up his house in Henrietta Street, Dublin, to spend the remainder of his days at Bray, County Wicklow. He died there on 14 April 1858, and was buried in the old cemetery of Powerscourt Demesne. In 1816 he married Anne, daughter of Sir Robert Langrishe, by whom he had two sons and four daughters.

At Mason's suggestion the committee of the Irish Society founded in 1844 two Bedell scholarships and a premium in Dublin University for encouraging the study of the Irish language. He was mainly instrumental in the establishment there of a professorship of Irish. In 1812 he was elected member of the Royal Irish Academy. In the summer session of 1817 the degrees of LL.B. and LL.D. were conferred on him by Dublin University.

He was a good musician; he composed several pretty airs, and was a fair violoncellist. His lack of tact saw him become embroiled in several disputes, for example with Owen Connellan.

== Select works ==
- Essay on the Antiquity and Constitution of Parliaments in Ireland, Dublin, 1820 (dedicated to Henry Grattan
- Irish-language version of the Book of Common Prayer issued at Dublin in 1825.
- Pamphlets written in support of the Irish Society and the Association for the Improvement of Prisons
- The Catholic Religion of St. Patrick and St. Columbkill, and the other Ancient Saints of Ireland, Dublin, 1823
- The Lord's Day: a Poem, Dublin, 1829.
- The Life of William Bedell, D.D., Lord Bishop of Kilmore, London, 1843
- Memoir of the Irish Version of the Bible, Dublin, 1854, a series of papers reprinted from the Christian Examiner.

== See also ==
- Owen Connellan
