= Walter Biggar Blaikie =

Scottish civil engineer, printer, historian and astronomer

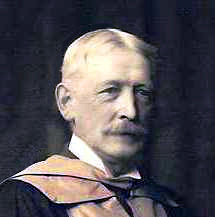
- Dr. Walter Biggar Blaikie (ca.1905)
- Born: 23 November 1847; Edinburgh, Scotland
- Died: 3 May 1928 (aged 80); Edinburgh, Scotland
- Occupations: Civil engineer Printer writer historian
- Spouse: Janet Marshall Macfie (1852–1942)
- Children: 5 daughters
- Parent(s): Rev Prof William Garden Blaikie (1820–1899); Margaret Catherine Biggar/Blaikie (1823–1915)

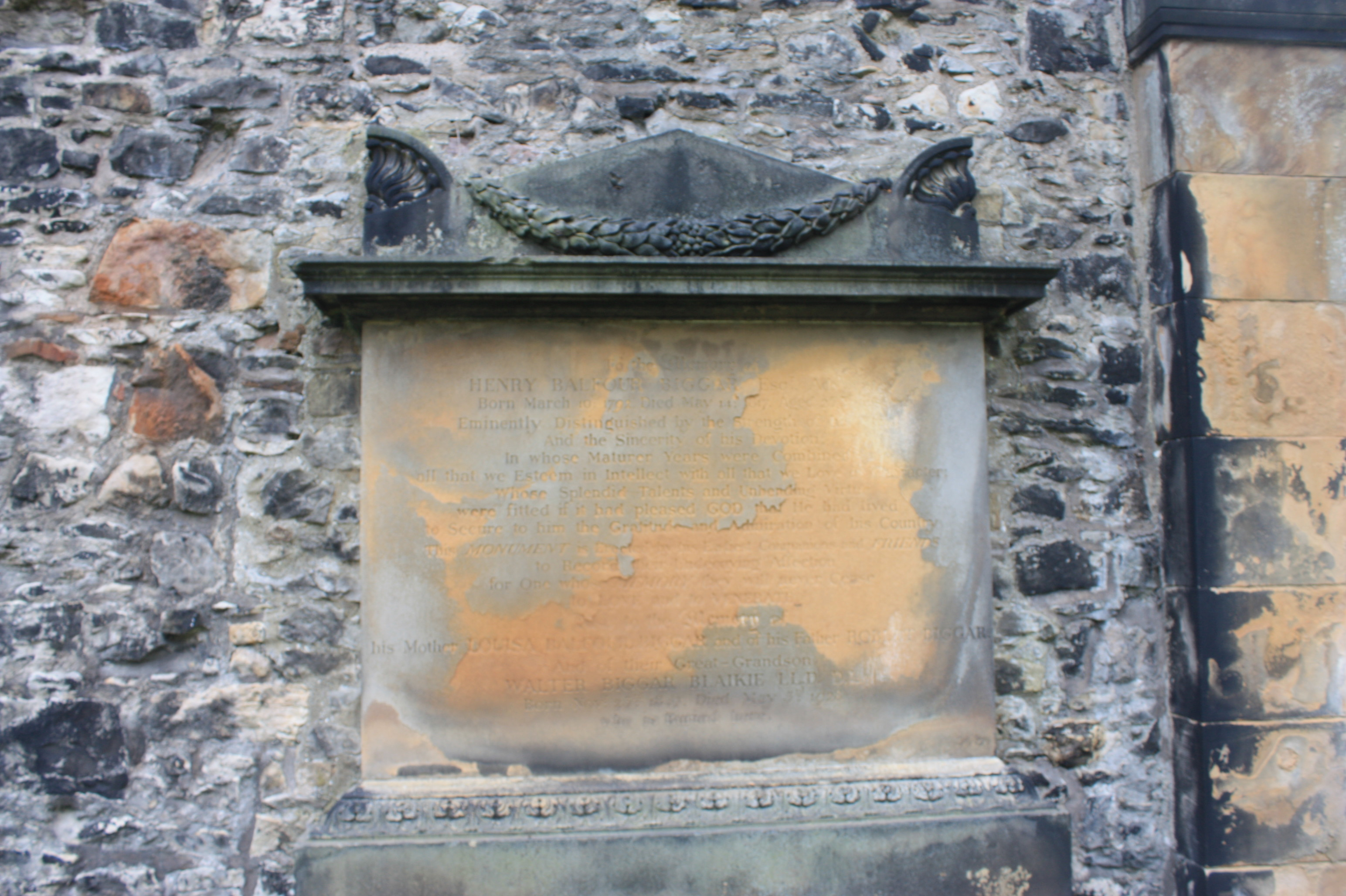
The grave of Walter Biggar Blaikie, St Cuthberts, Edinburgh

Walter Biggar Blaikie FRSE DL LLD (23 November 1847 in Pilrig, Edinburgh – 3 May 1928) was a Scottish civil engineer, printer, historian and astronomer.

== Life ==
Second of the seven recorded sons of Margaret Catherine Biggar and William Garden Blaikie, minister of Pilrig Free Church, Walter Biggar Blaikie was educated at Edinburgh Academy and the University of Edinburgh.

He worked as a civil engineer with the Department for Public Works in India from 1870 until 1873, but after the birth of their first child he and his wife returned to Scotland to work for the large engineering firm of Blyth & Blyth where he worked until 1880. In 1879, he became involved in the printing business which became T and A Constable of Edinburgh. He would work with the firm for almost 50 years, and for many years he ran it.

He became one of the leading scholars of the Jacobite period, especially of the life of Bonnie Prince Charlie.

In 1897, he was elected a Fellow of the Royal Society of Edinburgh, his proposers being John George Bartholomew, Sir John Murray, Frederick Bailey and Hugh Robert Mill. He served as Vice President of the Society from 1924 to 1927.

He is buried in the grave of his maternal grandfather, Henry Balfour Biggar, in the north-east corner of the north extension to St Cuthberts Churchyard in Edinburgh. He is the last named on a badly eroded stone.

== Walter Blaikie Collection ==
In 1928 his daughters donated a large collection of his historical papers concerning the Jacobite Uprising and the Stuarts to the National Library of Scotland. This ran to 1076 printed items in 756 volumes, 42 manuscripts, 3 charters and around 400 engravings.

== Publications ==
- Itinerary of Prince Charles Edward (1896)
- Edinburgh at the Time of the Occupation of Prince Charles (1910)
- Origins of the 45 (1914)

== Awards and honours ==
- Honorary degree "Doctor of Laws" from the University of Edinburgh
- 1897 Fellow of the Royal Society of Edinburgh ("Ordinary Fellow")
- 1918 Deputy Lieutenant of the County and City of Edinburgh
