= Henry Lansdell =

British priest and explorer (1841–1919)

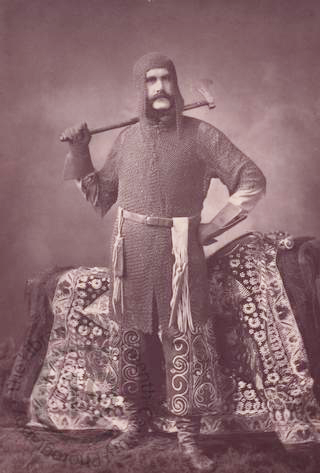
- Lansdell in Kokand armour with saddle cloth presented by the Emir of Bukhara
- Born: 10 January 1841; Tenterden, Kent, UK
- Died: 10 April 1919 (aged 78); Blackheath, London, UK
- Resting place: St Mary's Church, Greenwich, London, UK; 41.027°N 73.626°W
- Known for: Exploration of Central Asia
- Spouse: Mary

Henry Lansdell (10 January 1841 – 4 October 1919) was a nineteenth-century British priest in the Church of England. He was also a noted explorer and author.

== Life ==
Born in Tenterden, Kent, Lansdell was the son of a schoolmaster and home schooled before attending St John's College in Highbury, north London. He then studied at the London College of Divinity before his ordination as a deacon in 1868 and his assignment as a curate in Greenwich. He subsequently became secretary to the Irish Church Missions (1869–79) and founder and honorary secretary of the Homiletical Society (1874–86). He established the Clergyman's Magazine in 1875, which he edited until 1883.

After spending holidays in Europe, Lansdell began long and often arduous journeys to little-known parts of Asia. He distributed multi-lingual religious tracts and bibles provided by London missionary societies wherever he went, most notably in prisons and hospitals in Siberia and central Asia.

Lansdell had considerable experience of visits to prisons. He had first visited Newgate Prison in 1867, followed by other visits to prisons at Winchester, Portland, Millbank, Dover, York, Exeter, Geneva, Guernsey, and Edinburgh. However, the systematic visits of continental prisons first emerged in 1874. He decided to set out together with the Rev. John Philip Hobson (1849–1925), a fellow curate of Greenwich, where they distributed religious literature, primarily supplied by the Religious Tract Society in the prisons. As he wrote:

“I started for Russia & Denmark, Sweden, and Finland, intending to return through Poland, Austria, and Prussia. We saw the prisons of Copenhagen and Stockholm, but they were well supplied with books, and needed not our help; whereas, in the old castles used as prisons at Abo and Wiborg, our papers were thankfully accepted.” Lansdell was initially surprised at the reception they had received in Russia in 1874 “we sent 2,000 pamphlets into the prisons of Petersburg, reserving a third thousand for giving away on the railway to Moscow, not knowing at that time that for such open distribution a permission is needed”. Further visits in Europe were followed again in 1876, 1877. However, it was in 1878 and a longer journey in 1879 that he primarily concentrated on Russia and Siberia and they became the basis of his book Through Siberia. His attention to Siberian prisons had been first brought to him by the Finnish teacher and philanthropist Alba Hellman (1845–1894) whom he had met in Finland and who had corresponded with him. Lansdell quoted from one of her inspirational letters to him:

“You (English) have sent missionarys round the all world, to China, Persia, Palestina, Africa, the Islands of Sandwich, to many places of the Continent of Europe; but to the great, great Siberia, where so much is to do, you not have sent missionarys. Have you not a Morrison, a Moffatt, for Siberia. Pastor Lansdell, go you yourself to Siberia!"

At the beginning of May 1879 he reached St. Petersburg. His rosy-coloured depiction of Russian prisons would elicit considerable criticism from Russian emigrees such as Kropotkin and Stepniak, and in 1883 from Eleanor Marx, who ridiculed Lansdell's article that was actually a reply to Kropotkin's criticism of him, that he considered unfounded. Lansdell's article “A Russian Prison”, had appeared in The Contemporary Review, Vol. XLIII. February 1883. Eleanor Marx chided “his optimist views of Russian prisons” in her own review in the March edition of the socialist magazine Progress.

Such activities sometimes aroused the suspicions of the Russian authorities and on one occasion he was arrested while travelling on the Perm Railway after it was thought he was distributing revolutionary pamphlets.

Lansdell's accounts of his travels across the Central Asian Steppe published in 1887 by Harper's Magazine describe in detail the Turko-Tartar, Caucasian and ethnic diversity of the region, as well as the geographic, topographic and climate diversity.

Lansdell's journey from Hotan to Yarkand in present-day Xinjiang "across deserts abominable" was probably the first by any Englishman.

He was the author of a number of books including Chinese Central Asia: A Ride to Little Tibet, which ran to five editions in English and was also translated into German, Danish, and Swedish. The two volumes recorded part of Lansdell's 5,000-mile (8,000 km) journey through Europe and Africa to Asia. He travelled from Lake Balkash through Kashgar to Little Tibet (now known as Baltistan) by horse and yak at heights of up to 18,000 feet (5,500 m), in the process crossing the entire mountain systems of Central Asia. Lansdell's objective was to deliver a letter from the Archbishop of Canterbury to the Dalai Lama, which he hoped would grant him access to the then closed capital of Tibet at Lhasa. In the end he was unable to obtain the requisite permission and had to make do with purchasing items from a trader who had been to Tibet.

Lansdell was a member of the Royal Asiatic Society, the Royal Geographical Society (elected 1876), and a life member of the British Association for the Advancement of Science on whose committee he served.

He died on 4 October 1919 at home in Blackheath, London, and is buried in St Mary's Church, Greenwich at his own request.

== Legacy ==
In 1922, Lansdell's wife Mary bequeathed a large collection of items he had collected on his travels to Canterbury Museum (now Canterbury Heritage Museum) as "a memorial to my late husband".

== Works ==
- Henry Lansdell (1882). Through Siberia. New York: Arno Press. (2 volumes)
- Henry Lansdell (1885). Russian Central Asia, Including Kuldja, Bokhara, Khiva and Merv. London: S. Low, Marston, Searle, and Rivington. (2 volumes)
- Henry Lansdell (1887). Sons of the Steppe (PDF). London: Harper's Magazine.
- Henry Lansdell (1893). Chinese Central Asia – a Ride to Little Tibet. London: S. Low, Marston, & Co. (2 volumes)
- Henry Lansdell (1906). The Sacred Tenth; Or, Studies in Tithe-giving, Ancient and Modern … With Portraits, Maps, Illustrations and Appendices, Containing a Bibliography on Tithe-giving, Etc. London.
