= Bofealan =

Townland in the civil parish of Templeport, County Cavan, Ireland

Coordinates: 54.07514°N 7.810271°W

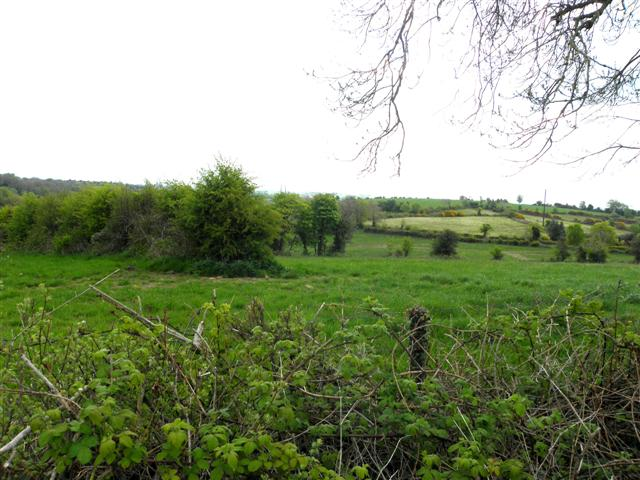
Bofealan Townland, Templeport, County Cavan, as viewed toward south-east

Bofealan (from Irish Both Fialáin, meaning 'Phelan's booth or hut') is a townland in the civil parish of Templeport, County Cavan, Ireland. It lies in the Roman Catholic parish of Templeport and barony of Tullyhaw.

== Geography ==
Bofealan is bounded on the north by Moher and Mullanacre Lower townlands in Tomregan parish and Clontycarnaghan townland, on the west by Urhannagh townland, on the east by Drumane townland and on the south by Killynaff townland. It includes a subdivision called Ballyness (Irish derived place name either Béal Átha an Easa, meaning Entrance to the Ford of the Waterfall or Baile an Easa, meaning 'Town of the Waterfall'). Bofealan's chief geographical features are the Crooked River (Ireland) and a disused mill race and pond. Bofealan is traversed by rural lanes. The townland covers 78 statute acres.

== History ==
In medieval times the McGovern barony of Tullyhaw was divided into economic taxation areas called ballibetoes, from the Irish Baile Biataigh (Anglicized as 'Ballybetagh'), meaning 'A Provisioner's Town or Settlement'. The original purpose was to enable the farmer, who controlled the baile, to provide hospitality for those who needed it, such as poor people and travellers. The ballybetagh was further divided into townlands farmed by individual families who paid a tribute or tax to the head of the ballybetagh, who in turn paid a similar tribute to the clan chief. The steward of the ballybetagh would have been the secular equivalent of the erenagh in charge of church lands. There were seven ballibetoes in the parish of Templeport. Bofealan was located in the ballybetagh of "Ballen Tulchoe" (alias 'Bally Tullagh'). The original Irish is Baile Tulach, meaning 'The Town of the Hillock').

The 1609 Baronial Map depicts the townland as Rafian. The 1652 Commonwealth Survey spells the name as Bofelane and Rafeean. The 1665 Down Survey map depicts it as Bovelan.

From medieval times until 1606, the townland formed part of the lands owned by the McGovern (name) clan. Richard Tyrrell of Tyrrellspass, County Westmeath, purchased the townland c. 1606 from Cormack McGovern, who was probably the son of Tomas Óg mac Brian Mág Samhradháin, who reigned as chief of the McGovern clan from 1584. A schedule, dated 31 July 1610, of the lands Tyrrell owned in Tullyhaw prior to the Ulster Plantation included: Boffylan, one cartron (a cartron was about 30 acres of arable land).

In the Plantation of Ulster, Tyrrell swapped his lands in Bofealan for additional land in the barony of Tullygarvey where he lived at the time. In a grant 29 April 1611, along with other lands, King James VI and I then granted: one poll of Boevealan to Hugh McManus Oge Magauran, gentleman. He was the great-grandson of a previous Magauran chief, Tomás mac Maghnus Mág Samhradháin, who ruled from 1512 to 1532. His father Manus Og lived in Cor, Templeport and received a pardon in 1586. In the Plantation of Ulster by grant dated 4 June 1611, along with other lands, King James VI and I also granted one poll of Rathfyan to Bryan McShane O'Reyly.

Trinity College Dublin's records from the Irish Rebellion of 1641 contain a deposition from a dispossessed County Cavan Protestant woman, Awdrey Carington (Audrey Carrington), about the rebellion in Bofealan:

Awdrey Carington of the Relict of Thomas Carington late of Ballenesse in the County of Cavan sworne and examined deposeth and saith That in the very beginning of the present Rebellion within the County aforesaid shee this deponent and her said husband (whoe was then alyve) were expelled and driven from their howse & farme of Ballenesse aforesaid, and robbed and deprived of Cowes yong Cattle Mares howsholdgoods ready money and other goods and chattells of the value & to their losse of £101 or thereabouts By the Rebells Charles Magowran of Bally Magowran in the said County gent & divers others of that name & others his complicees confederates and souldjers whom shee cannott nominate, And at the same tyme they were att Droughill in the same County robbed & deprived of a Quantety of Oats worths £6. By the Rebell Phillip mc Shane ô Rely of, or nere, Kilmore in the County of Cavan (whoe then forceibly entered vpon the land of Drowghill belonging to Sir Edward Bagshaw knighte & possesseth the same) and by his partakers & souldjers whose names she cannott expresse, And sayth that by the perswasion of the said Charles Magowran, her said husband (being a weaver, was perswaded to goe back againe & stay with her this deponent his wife & 7 Children & work vpon his trade of a weaver; And vpon faire promisses to haue some of their goodes restored they all stayd & he worked vpon his trade at Bellenesse aforesaid for the Rebells, whoe would neuer pay any thinge Considerably for their work Soe as they were forced to remove to Belturbett; from thence the Rebells would not suffer them to come away but they all were restrained there for above a yere: During which tyme of their stay in that County the Rebells at Belturbett (as this deponent was credibly told) & verely beleeveth drowned at Beltubett bridge, about fifty protestants, and hanged one Mr Carr, & one Tymothy Dickinson And the deponent and her husband (though staid and restrained there becawse of his trade) yet they were still in feare & danger of their Lives: lookeing every day when the Rebells would either fetch them away to Drowne, or murther them Howsoever it pleased god to preserve their liues yet they lived in great want, and her husband about November 1642 died att Belturbett aforesaid, Leaveing her this deponent & children to the mercy of the Rebells; whoe at the length suffered them to come away from Belturbett aforesaid, but before they came to Cavan certeine Stragling vnknowne rebells robbed the deponent of what meate & provision she hadd, And afterwards when they were comen out of the County of Cavan divers other stragling Rebells whome she knew not robbed her, the deponent & her children of such apparell and things as they carried, saveing some clothes on their backs, and they stript one woman in their company stark naked, whoe had a child in her Armes, and in deed they lefte nothing with any one of the deponents company (that were about 140 persons) that was worth takeing away: Howbeit with much difficulty she & the rest escaped with liffe to the English Army. She further saith That after the drowneing of the people at Belturbett. It was a Common report amongst the very Irish themselves thereabouts that none durst come vnto nor stay at the bridge of Belturbett, becawse some spiritt or ghost came often thither & cryed Reveng Reveng: Shee further saith that the Rebells at Belturbett kept their feast of Ester next following the beginning of the Rebellion, vpon Palmsunday & the daies following which was a iust weeke before our feast of Ester, And on that which they then kept for Ester day, The Rebell Owen Brady then a Com[m]ander there & the rest of the Rebells as they came from Masse, sett fyre on, and burned the most part of the towne of Belturbett aforesaid together with the Church there which was a goodly faire building signum predictæ [mark] Awdreæ Carington Jur xxjo October 1645 coram Hen: Jones Will: Aldrich Cavan Awdrey Carington Jur 21 Oct 1645 Intw hand [Copy at MS 832, fols 109r-109v]

As a result of their participation in the 1641 Rebellion, the Bofealan lands were confiscated from the native Irish and granted to John Blashford. The 1652 Commonwealth Survey lists the proprietor being Lieutenant John Blackforde and the tenant being Gilleesaog O'Rely, both of whom appear as proprietor and tenant for several other Templeport townlands in the same survey. John Blachford was born in 1598 in Ashmore, Dorset, England, the son of Richard and Frances Blachford. He became a merchant in Dorchester, Dorset but fled to France in 1633 when facing a warrant from the Exchequer for not paying customs. He married Mary Renald from Devon and died at Lissanover, County Cavan in 1661 and was buried at St. Orvins in Dublin (probably St. Audoen's Church, Dublin (Church of Ireland)) despite wishing to be buried back in Dorchester. His will was published on 9 January 1665 leaving his son John Blachford as his sole heir. An Inquisition held in Cavan on 21 May 1667 found that his widow Mary Blachford and his heir John were seized of, inter alia, the land of Bovillan alias Bovealan. He had four sons (John, Thomas, Ambrose and William, the last of whom became a Major) and two daughters, Mary and Frances. Major William Blachford was born in 1658 and died at Lissanover on 28 March 1727. The Blachford family gravestones in Templeport Church read as follows- This monument was erected by MAJOR WILLIAM / BLASHFORD of Lisnover in 1721 to the memory of / his father, JOHN BLASHFORD, late of the same Esqr. but / from Dorchester in Dorsetshire, the place of his / nativity, who in his lifetime chose this for a burying / place, for himself and family, but died in Dublin / was buried in St. Orvins Church but his wife, MARY / RENALD of a Devonsheire family is buried here / as also three sons and two daughters, viz JOHN / AMBROSE AND THOMAS; MARY AND FRANCES / Here likewise lies buried two wives of MAJOR WILLIAM BLASHFORD, son to the said JOHN BLASHFORD viz / MARY MAGHEE of an ancient Family in Lincolnsheire. CORNET CHIDLEY BLACHFORD, son to MAJOR WILLIAM BLACHFORD, leys buried here who dyed August ye 29th, 1722. This aboue MAJOR WILLIAM BLACHFORD. / That erected this monument, died the 28th of March 1727, aged 69 years.

A deed dated 10 May 1744 spells the name as Ballyness, Buffealan and Rathfian. The 1790 Cavan Carvaghs list spells the townland name as Rafyanolin and Bofelon.

The Tithe Applotment Books for 1827 list twelve tithepayers in the townland.

The Bofealan Valuation Office Field books are available for 1839-1841.

Griffith's Valuation (1857) lists six landholders in the townland.

In the Dúchas Folklore Collection there is a description of Bofealan in 1938. In the same collection there are folktales about Ballyness Mill.

The Kells family have lived in the townland for about 300 years.

== Census ==
Year	Population	Males	Females	Total Houses	Uninhabited
1841	14	17	117	7	0
1851	34	18	16	9	0
1861	27	14	13	5	0
1871	19	10	9	3	0
1881	21	9	12	5	1
1891	9	6	3	3	1

In the 1901 census of Ireland, there are two families listed in the townland and in the 1911 census, there are three families listed in the townland.

== Antiquities ==
The 1836 Ordnance Survey Namebooks state- There is a corn mill on the North side of the townland with a good fall of water and a wheel, 18 feet in diameter. There is nothing else remarkable in the townland. (This mill belonged to the Tegart/Teggart family. The book entitled The Tegarts of Co. Cavan, Eire, 1781-1972, by Harriet Bradley Tegart gives full details.)
