= Philip Crampton Smyly =

British judge and colonial administrator (1866-1953)

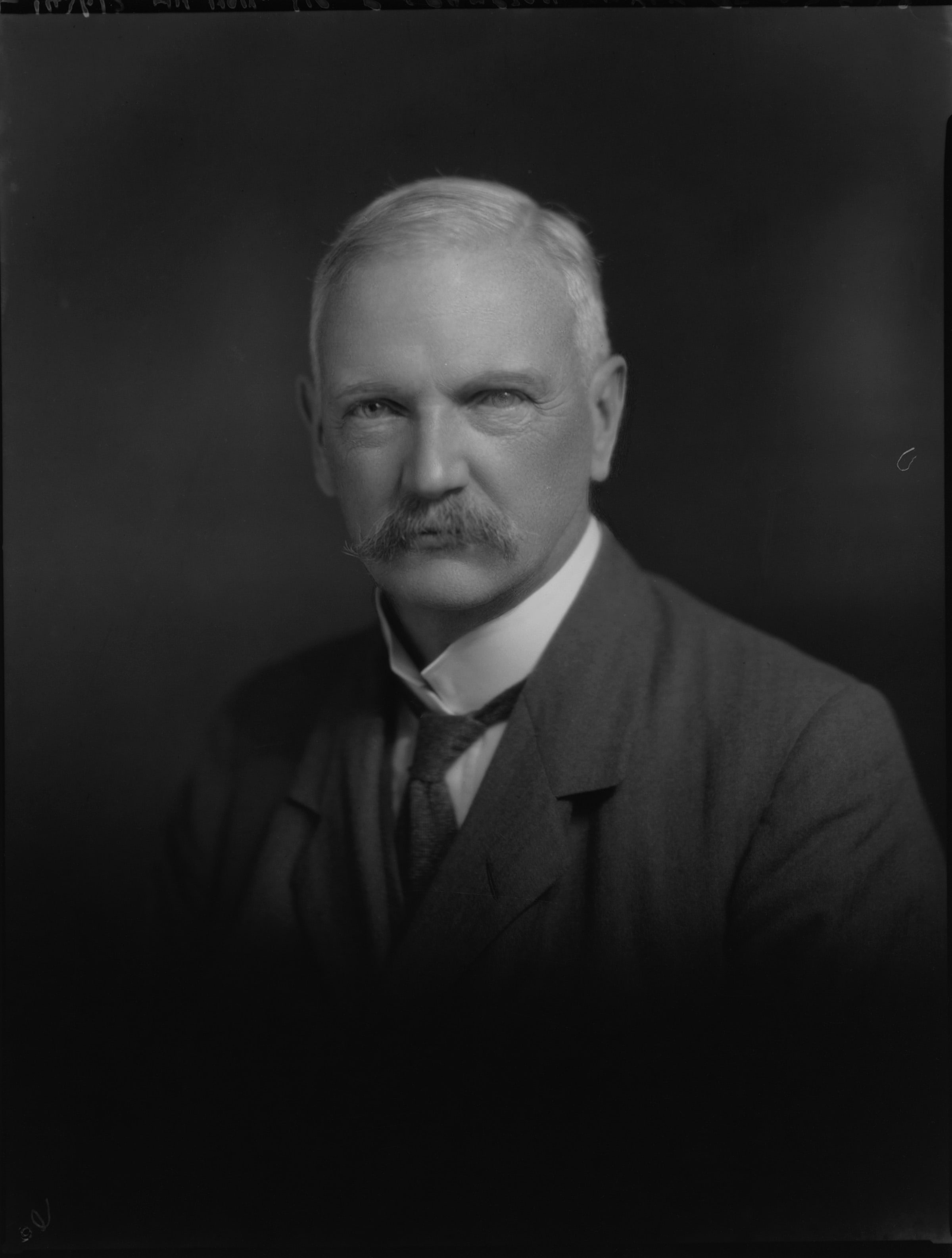
Smyly in 1929

Sir Philip Crampton Smyly (28 March 1866 – 1953) was a British judge and colonial administrator.

== Career ==
Smyly was the son of the surgeon Sir Philip Crampton Smyly, Surgeon-in-ordinary to Queen Victoria and to successive Lords-Lieutenant of Ireland, and grandson of Ellen Smyly. His mother was the Hon. Selina Marina Plunket, daughter of the 3rd Baron Plunket.

== Sierra Leone ==
He was Attorney General of Sierra Leone when he was appointed Chief Justice of that protectorate in November 1901. He was knighted in 1905 and held the post until 1911.

His photographs from his stay in Sierra Leone are kept as part of the Royal Commonwealth Society collection held in the Cambridge University Library.

== Gold Coast ==
He was appointed Chief Justice of the Gold Coast (present-day Ghana) on 14 September 1911.

The Governor at the time of his appointment in the Gold Coast was Sir James Thorburn, but most of his career in the Gold Coast was under two Governors of unusual qualities, Sir Hugh Clifford (1912–1919) and Sir Gordon Guggisberg (1919–1927).

== Family ==
Smyly married, in 1905, his cousin Aileen Smyly, daughter of Sir William Josiah Smyly (1850–1941), President Royal College of Physicians in Ireland, by Eleanor Colpoyse Tweedy.
