= William Urwick the elder =

English Congregational minister and author

William Urwick (1791–1868), the elder, was an English Congregational minister and author, for most of his life in Ireland. He was known in Dublin as the "little giant".

== Life ==
The son of William Urwick by his wife, Elinor Eddowes, he had Thomas Urwick as great-uncle and was born in Shrewsbury on 8 December 1791. He was educated at Worcester under Thomas Belsher, and in 1812 entered Hoxton Academy to study for the Congregational ministry under Robert Simpson.

In 1815 Urwick was invited to the pastorate of the church at Sligo in Ireland, and was ordained there on 19 June 1816. He undertook the converting of Roman Catholics, took the lead in philanthropic movements, and acted as secretary of the famine committee in 1824–5. He tried to prevent duelling, which was rife in the district.

Urwick was called in 1826 to the pastorate of the chapel in York Street, Dublin that had been built in 1808 by the Countess of Huntingdon's connexion. He filled the huge building, with many students attending. With Henry Harvey he was a pioneer of the temperance movement. In 1832 he was called to the chair of dogmatics and pastoral theology in the Dublin Theological Institute, a post which he filled, with his pastorate, for twenty years. The degree of D.D. was conferred on him the same year by Dartmouth College.

Preaching throughout Ireland, Urwick founded an Irish Congregational home mission, of which he acted as honorary secretary for some years; he agitated for home rule in church matters against the opposition of the Irish Evangelical Society of London with its paid officers. He was one of the founders of the Evangelical Alliance, inaugurated at Liverpool in 1845. He attended its meetings regularly, and spoke in Paris in 1855 and at Geneva in 1862.

Fifty years of Urwick's residence and work in Ireland was celebrated in November 1865, when a cheque for £2,000 was presented to him by Irish churches; some of it he gave to charities. He died in Dublin on 16 July 1868, aged 76.

== Works ==
Urwick's two major works appeared in 1839. The Saviour's Right to Divine Worship took the form of letters on the Unitarian controversy addressed to James Armstrong, then William Hamilton Drummond's colleague in Strand Street. The Second Advent opposed the premillennialism. In the "Papal Aggression" controversy of the 1850s, he published The Triple Crown (1852) on the papacy.

In 1829 Urwick published The Evils, Occasions, and Cure of Intemperance. He published in 1831 The true Nature of Christ's Person and Atonement stated, in reply to Edward Irving, and in the following year One hundred Reasons from Scripture for believing in the Deity of Christ. In 1835 he published The Value and Claims of the Sacred Scriptures, and Reasons of Separation from the Church of Rome. Archbishop Richard Whately having published a letter to his Church of Ireland clergy forbidding the holding of meetings at which extempore prayers were offered, Urwick issued a reply Extemporary Prayer in Public Worship considered, 1836.

Urwick also wrote a memoir of his friend Thomas Kelly the hymn-writer. He marked the bicentenary of the Act of Uniformity 1662 by Independency in Dublin in the Olden Time (1862), giving the lives of Samuel Winter, provost of Trinity College, Dublin, from 1650 to 1660; John Rogers of St. Bride's, John Murcot, and Samuel Mather. In March 1866 he published Christ's World School, essays in verse on Matt. xxviii. 18–20, and he left in manuscript two other poems, "The Inheritance of the Saints" and "My Sligo Ministry". His last book, Biographic Sketches of James Digges La Touche, the patron of Sunday schools in Ireland, appeared after his death. A Father's Letters to his Son on coming of Age was published by the Religious Tract Society in 1874.

Other works by Urwick were:

- A Concise View of the Ordinance of Baptism, 1822.
- A Collection of Hymns, 1829.
- The Duty of Christians in regard to the use of Property, 1836.
- Thoughts suggested by the Ecclesiastical Movement in Scotland, 1843.
- Remarks on the Connection between Religion and the State, 1845.
- A Life of John Howe, prefixed to The Redeemer's Tears, Howe's selected works, 1847, in the "Library of Puritan Divines" by Thomas Nelson.
- A Voice from an Outpost, two discourses on the "papal aggression", 1850.
- China, two lectures, 1854.
- Earth's Rulers Judged, on the death of Nicholas I of Russia, 1855.
- History of Dublin, for the Religious Tract Society.

== Family ==
On 16 June 1818 Urwick married Sarah (d. 1852), daughter of Thomas and Mary Cooke of Shrewsbury. They had ten children, five dying young. Of the two surviving sons, William Urwick the younger also became a minister.
