= William Urwick the younger =

Anglo-Irish nonconformist minister and antiquarian chronicler

William Urwick the younger (1826–1905) was an Anglo-Irish nonconformist minister and antiquarian chronicler.

== Life ==
Born at Sligo on 8 March 1826, he was second son of William Urwick the elder (1791–1868), nonconformist divine, and his wife Sarah (1791–1852), daughter of Thomas Cooke of Shrewsbury. His early education was under his father. He graduated at Trinity College, Dublin, B.A. in 1848, M.A. in 1851. From Dublin he went on to the Lancashire Independent College, Manchester, where he studied (1848–51) under Robert Vaughan and Samuel Davidson.

On 19 June 1851 Urwick was ordained minister at Hatherlow, Cheshire, where he remained for twenty-three years, as pastor, and district secretary (later, president) of the Cheshire Congregational Union. Moving to London, he filled (1874–7) the chair of Hebrew and Old Testament exegesis at New College, London. Still living in London, he became in 1880 minister of Spicer Street chapel in St. Albans, where he rebuilt the Sunday schools, improved the church premises, and undertook temperance and other social work, resigning in 1895.

On a visit to his sisters in the old family home at Dublin, Urwick died there on 20 August 1905.

== Works ==
Urwick published:

- Historical Sketches of Nonconformity in the County Palatine of Chester, 1864; a collection of papers by local ministers and laymen, and Urwick's own work in it was criticised by Henry David Roberts in Matthew Henry and his Chapel (1901).
- Life and Letters of William Urwick, D.D., 1870, on his father.
- Ecumenical Councils, 6 pts. 1870.
- Errors of Ritualism, Manchester, 1872 (lectures).
- The Nonconformists and the Education Act, 1872.
- The Papacy and the Bible, Manchester, 1874, in controversy with Kenelm Vaughan.
- The Servant of Jehovah, 1877 (commentary on Isaiah lii. 13–liii. 12).
- Indian Pictures, 1881.
- Nonconformity in Herts (1884)
- Bible Truths and Church Errors, 1888, arguing to prove John Bunyan was not a Baptist.
- Early History of Trinity College, Dublin (1892)
- Nonconformity in Worcester (1897);

He also translated from the German:

- H. Martensen's Christian Dogmatics (1886);
- J. Müller's Christian Doctrine of Sin (1868, 2 vols.);
- Friedrich Bleek's Introduction to the New Testament (1869–70, 2 vols.);
- H. Cremer's Biblicotheological Lexicon of New Testament Greek (1872).

Urwick edited his father's Biographic Sketches of J. D. Latouche (1868), and T. A. Urwick's Records of the Family of … Urwick (1893).

== Family ==
Urwick married on 1 June 1859 Sophia (1832–1897), daughter of Thomas Hunter of Manchester. They had four sons and five daughters.

== Notes ==
Attribution

This article incorporates text from a publication now in the public domain: Lee, Sidney, ed. (1912). "Urwick, William". Dictionary of National Biography (2nd supplement). Vol. 3. London: Smith, Elder & Co.
