= James Thorburn (colonial administrator) =

British colonial administrator (1864–1929)

Sir James Jamieson Thorburn CMG (1864 – 14 September 1929) was a British colonial administrator, Governor of the Gold Coast (today's Ghana) from 1910 to 1912.

== Life ==
James Thorborn was the son of William Thorburn of Edinburgh and Ruth, widow of R. Bertram Parsey. Educated at Edinburgh Collegiate School, he entered the Ceylon Civil Service in 1886. Transferred to Southern Nigeria in 1905, he was Lieutenant-Governor of Southern Nigeria and Lagos from 1906 to 1910. He succeeded John Rodger as Governor of the Gold Coast on 21 November 1910. He retired on 29 June 1912, to be succeeded by Hugh Clifford. Sir Philip Crampton Smyly served under Thorburn.
