= Irish Society for Promoting the Education of the Native Irish through the Medium of Their Own Language =

The Irish society for promoting the scriptural education and religious instruction of the Irish-speaking population chiefly through the medium of their own language, sometimes called the Irish Society, was a Protestant missionary society which proselytized among Irish-speaking Roman Catholics. It was founded in 1818 in Dublin by members of the Church of Ireland and remained in existence until 1914.

The main movers in setting up the society were Henry Joseph Monck Mason and Bishop Robert Daly. Its offices were located at 16 Upper Sackville St., Dublin. Mason acted as its secretary for many years, besides writing several tracts in furtherance of its objectives.

The society claimed to be interdenominational and to respect religious differences. However, the organisation's literature, often published to attract donations from England, demonstrates that the eventual objective was one of conversion. Missionaries liked to concentrate on aspects of the Bible which they believed contradicted Catholic teaching.

Members of the society placed emphasis on education, which would allow the Irish natives access to the scriptures in Irish for the first time. A teaching mission was set up in the Kingscourt area of County Cavan, and the success of the venture encouraged the society to establish charity schools to promote education through the Irish language. Catholic teachers were employed, as few Protestants knew Irish. These teachers were prized for their local knowledge and the fact that they could draw upon networks of friends and family. However, school inspectors were Protestants.

In 1835, the society reported that it had 514 salaried teachers and that over 14,000 pupils had been inspected. By 1844 the society reported that it had in place a system of elementary education in twenty-four counties, including schools, teachers, supervisors and delivery men for religious literature. In 1849 it reported that it had distributed more than 30,000 books, mostly in Irish, to teachers and scholars.

The Catholic Church condemned the schools and those who worked in them. Sometimes violent conflicts arose between supporters and objectors. On occasions, the police were needed at the funerals of converts and at public appearances by ministers who were converted priests.

At Mason's suggestion, the committee of the Irish Society founded in 1844 two Bedell scholarships and a premium in Trinity College Dublin for encouraging the study of the Irish language. He was mainly instrumental in the establishment there of a professorship of Irish.

In 1848, the Irish Society in partnership with the controversial Irish Church Missions to Roman Catholics (ICM) undertook projects in Galway and Mayo. This was a difficult alliance due to the aggressive evangelical zeal of the ICM founder, Rev. Alexander Dallas, and his anti-Catholic tirades, which caused much bitterness in the areas, as well as with members of the Irish Society, particularly in Trinity College.

In 1861, the society was instrumental in the translation into Irish of the Book of Common Prayer / Leabhar na nUrnaighe Comhchoitchionn.

The society existed until 1914, and in the early years of the 20th century during the Home Rule movement, offered its belief in Scripture to solve issues. In the last 20 years of its existence, it sold off its property and schools to survive.
