= Cane River (Jamaica) =

Location
- Country: Jamaica

Physical characteristics
- Source
  - coordinates: 18.015039°N 76.692746°W
  - elevation: 3,500 ft (1,100 m)
- 2nd source
  - coordinates: 18.0213439°N 76.7057276°W
  - elevation: 2,700 ft (820 m)
- Mouth
  - coordinates: 17.943574°N 76.697134°W
  - elevation: Sea level

The Cane River rises at twin sources in the vicinity of Derby Peak in eastern Saint Andrew Parish, Jamaica from where it flows south to the Caribbean Sea.

== See also ==
- List of rivers of Jamaica
