= Ellen Smyly =

Irish charity worker (1815-1901)

Ellen Smyly (née Franks; 1815–1901) was an Irish charity worker.

She was born on 14 November 1815, the daughter of Matthew Franks. She became a prominent philanthropist, fund-raising and setting up homes and schools for the poor. The Smyly Homes and subsequent Smyly Trust are named after her and her family.

At the age of 19, Smyly married the Dublin surgeon Josiah Smyly F.R.C.S.I. (1803–1864). Touched by the poverty and destitution in the city, she began her charity work.

In 1852, she set up her first bible school in Dublin, and by the 1870s had set up a number of schools and residential homes. Smyly or her daughters sat on the boards of most of these institutions. With the assistance of Rev. Alexander Dallas, she set up a school in a loft on Townsend Street and children of this home received schooling and food from his Irish Church Mission. A member of the Church of Ireland, Smyly's humanitarian mission was influenced by her religious beliefs.

She set up a residential home for boys and one for girls, and then in 1859 the Birds Nest in Dun Laoghaire for infants, her homes and organisation known as The Smyly Mission Homes and Ragged Schools of Dublin cared for over 1000 children at this time.

Smyly was involved in the Irish Church Missionaries Ragged School in the Coombe, initially opened in 1853 in Weaver's Hall, later moved to Newmarket Street. It was opened by Rev. Dallas of the ICM. It closed in 1944 and children were moved to the Smyly home in Monkstown.

Her homes are believed to have inspired the Dublin-born Dr. Thomas John Barnardo in setting up his homes.

In the 1870s, in connection with Annie Macpherson, children were sent to Canada from the Smyly homes in Dublin, similar to arrangements with English and Scottish homes.

Smyly died aged 86 on 16 May 1901, and the running of her homes was turned over to her daughters Annie Dallas Smyly (1855–1933) and her namesake Ellen Smyly (1846–1912). In 1905, her daughters set up a Smyly home called The Coombe Home in Hespeler, Ontario, Canada. In 1917, the Hespeler Home was transferred to the Christian Aid Mission.

She is buried in Mount Jerome Cemetery in Dublin.

Her third son Sir William Josiah Smyly (1850–1941), followed in her husband's medical career and was master of the Rotunda Hospital in Dublin. Her eldest son, Sir Philip Smyly was a surgeon similar to his father.

== Associated homes ==
- Elliot Home for Waifs and Strays - Founded in 1872, first in Abbeyview House in Bray, then in Charlemont Street, Dublin.
- The Ragged boys home - Founded in 1852 at Grand Canal Street, Dublin.
- The Home for Big Lads - Founded 1883, Townsend Street, Dublin.
- Irish Church Missionaries Ragged School in the Coombe - Opened in 1853 closed in 1944 and children moved to Boley House.
- Boley House, Monkstown, Dublin, formerly the home of Sir Valentine Grace run with the ICM.
- The Birds' Nest, Dun Laoghaire - Residential Home for Boys and Girls Founded in 1859, was in York Road, Dún Laoghaire.
- Connemara Orphan's Nursery (Spiddal Orphanage/Nead Le Farrige), Co. Galway - run in conjunction with the Irish Church Missions.
- Girls Home and Infant Day School, Luke Street, Dublin - established 1854, trained girls for domestic service.
