= Association for Promoting Christian Knowledge =

Ireland-based Christian charity

- Abbreviation: APCK
- Formation: 1792
- Founders: William Watson (bookseller), Reverend Dr George O’Connor, Reverend Singleton Harpur
- Founded at: Dublin
- Type: Church of Ireland; Christian media Christian charity Christian mission
- Headquarters: Church Avenue, Rathmines, Ireland
- Website: www.ireland.anglican.org/our-faith/apck

The Association for Promoting Christian Knowledge (APCK) is an Ireland-based Christian charity founded in 1792 as The Association for the Discountenancing of Vice (ADV). It has worked for over 200 years to increase awareness of the Christian faith in Ireland and across the world. It is linked to the Church of Ireland but independent from it.

== Origins ==
The Association for the Discountenancing of Vice and Promoting the Knowledge and Practice of Religion and Virtue, to Combat Infidelity and Immorality was founded in October 1792, at 7 Capel Street, Dublin, by William Watson (bookseller), Reverend Dr George O’Connor, and Reverend Singleton Harpur. It was founded as a publisher/distributor of Bibles and Christian tracts in Ireland. It was founded in response to the French Revolution of 1789, the distribution of the two parts of Thomas Paine's "Rights of Man", and the formation of the Society of United Irishmen.

=== Cheap Repository Tracts ===
Hannah More was invited to become an honorary member of the ADV in 1793 and in 1795 she invited the society to reprint her Cheap Repository titles. The ADV published ten tracts, adapted to the Irish conditions in 1795, but thereafter these were published commercially by William Watson 'at the recommendation of the Association' which continued to assist in their distribution until the early 1830s.

== Incorporation ==
The Society was incorporated in 1801, later becoming the Association for Discountenancing Vice and Promoting the Knowledge and Practice of the Christian Religion, and during the early 19th century became involved with administering government funds supporting schools for poor children. However, following the introduction of a standardized system of primary education in Ireland in the 1830s, the ADV lost its government grants and reverted to being an evangelical publisher. After 1832 the ADV continued to publish psalm books, editions of the Book of Common Prayer, church hymnals, and a scripture text book, from their book depository at 37 Dawson Street in Dublin.The ADV also maintained a book store at 86 Abbey Street Middle in Dublin which was burned down during the Easter Rising of 1916; they later received £952 in government compensation.

== Association for Promoting Christian Knowledge ==
During the 1920s the ADV changed its name to the Association for Promoting Christian Knowledge. The 1800 act of incorporation of the ADV was accidentally repealed by the Statute Law Revision Act 2007, but it was reinstated by the Statute Law Revision Act 2016.
