= Crooked River (Ireland) =

River in County Cavan, Ireland

The Crooked River rises in Loughan Macmartin at the top of Slieve Rushen Mountain, in the townland of Carrowmore, Parish of Tomregan, Barony of Tullyhaw, County Cavan, Ireland. It then flows in a southerly direction and discharges into the Shannon–Erne Waterway in the townland of Derryginny. It has a fish population of brown trout, pike, minnows, stone loach and perch.
