= Gortineddan =

Townland in County Fermanagh, Northern Ireland

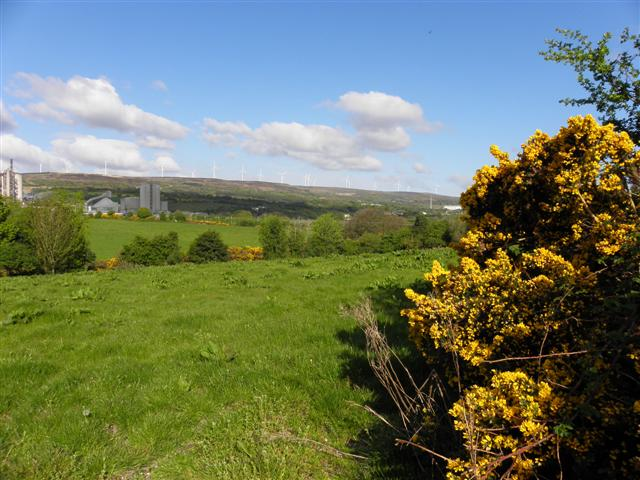
Gortineddan townland, Tomregan, County Fermanagh, Northern Ireland, looking west.

Gortineddan is a townland in the Civil Parish of Tomregan, Barony of Knockninny, County Fermanagh, Northern Ireland.

== Etymology ==
The townland name is an anglicisation of the Gaelic placename "Gort an Fheadáin" which means 'The Field of the Stream', the stream probably meaning the Duvoge river. The oldest surviving mention of the name is in the Annals of Ulster under the year 1450 AD when Donnchadh Maguire murdered Cathal Maguire, son of Thomas, Chief of the Maguires, at Gort-an-Fhedáin. The same Annals also note a battle at Gort-an-Fhedain in the year 1457 between Chief Thomas Maguire and Lochlann O’Rourke. The townland lies on the border with Cavan and the road south runs through it so it features in a lot of border incidents throughout history. The townland is later mentioned in a grant dated 14 October 1612 where it is spelled 'Gortmeddan'. Spellings in later documents are 1620 Gortmedan; 1639 Gartnedan; 1659 Gortened; 1675 Gartnedan and 1721 Gortnadan. Ambrose Leet's 1814 Directory spells the name as Gort-neden.

== Geography ==
It is bounded on the north by Ummera townland, on the east by Drumderg and Kiltycrose townlands, on the south by Carickaleese and Knockadoois townlands and on the west by Gortmullan townland and by the international border with County Cavan and the Republic of Ireland. Its chief geographical features are the Duvoge River, Oak Wood and a drumlin hill reaching to 70 metres above sea-level. The townland is traversed by the B127 Border Road to Ballyconnell and some minor lanes. Gortineddan covers an area of 255 statute acres.

== History ==
=== Medieval ===
Gortineddan formed part of the ballybethagh of Calvagh in medieval times. As it was a border townland the ownership was contested between the McGovern and Maguire clans.

The Annals of Ulster for 1450 state- And a year of the Indulgences was it in Rome: to wit, the Golden Door was opened in Rome. Mag Uidhir went to Rome this year, namely, king of Fir-Manach; that is, Thomas, son of Philip of the battle-axe. And mournful were the learned companies and poets and clerics of Ireland after him. For there was not left after him in Ireland one that had placed greater obligation on them than he and one that purchased more of poetic and of erudite composition. And a month before Lamas he left his own residence to go on that pilgrimage. And, a week after his departure, came Donchadh Mag Uidhir of Tellach-Dunchadha, namely, son of Mag Uidhir's father, to attack Cathal Mag Uidhir, that is, the son of Mag Uidhir (to wit, son of Thomas junior was that Cathal). And he captured him in his own house at Cnoc-Ninte and took him and his spoil with him from Knockninny Hill to Gort-an-feadain and killed him then in fratricide. And himself went into Tellach-Dunchadha and was warring upon Edmond Mag Uidhir and upon Donchadh Mag Uidhir. And Edmond and Donchadh went to a place of meeting with Donchadh of Tellach-Dunchadha and peace was made by them with each other. And Edmond made Donchadh of Tellach-Dunchadha prisoner in Gabail-liuin and took him with him to Achadh-urchaire and deprived him of a foot and hand in punishment of his own wicked proceeding, namely, the killing of Cathal Mag Uidhir. Now, that retribution which Edmond wrought in satisfaction of that fratricide which Donchadh of Tellach-Dunchadha wrought was lauded and so on.

The Annals of the Four Masters for the same year state- Maguire, Thomas, son of Thomas, son of Philip na Tuaighe, went on a pilgrimage to Rome. A week afterwards Donough Dunchadhach, Maguire's (Thomas Oge) step-brother, went to Cathal, son of Maguire, took him prisoner at his own place (or house) at Cnoc-Ninnigh, and brought him and his spoils to Gort-an-fheadain, where he put him to death; after which he proceeded to Teallach Dunchadha (Tullyhunco), to make war against Edmond and Donough Maguire. In some time afterwards Donough Dunchadhach came to a conference with Edmond and Donough, and they made peace with one another; but notwithstanding this, Edmond in the end took Donough Dunchadhach prisoner at Gabhail-liuin, and brought him with him to Achadh-Urchair (Aghalurcher), where he cut off one of his feet and one of his hands, in revenge of the killing of Cathal.

The Annals of Ulster for 1457 state- Great war arose this year between Mag Uidhir, namely, king of Fir-Manach and Ua Ruairc, namely, Lochlann, son of Tadhg Ua Ruairc. Mag Uidhir and Ua Ruairc appointed a meeting with each other opposite Ath-Conaill. Mag Uidhir and Brian, son of Philip Mag Uidhir, went with a few people—that is, six horsemen and three score footmen—to meet Ua Ruairc. When Ua Ruairc and the Tellach-Eathach and Tellach-Dunchadha learned that Mag Uidhir was accompanied by only a small force, they gave him a hostile meeting. When Mag Uidhir saw the deceit practised on him, he went forward to Gort-an-fedain. There a battalion of kern and a battalion of gallowglasses of the people of Ua Ruairc overtook him. Then Mag Uidhir and Brian Mag Uidhir, with the six that were on horses and the three score kern, turned on them and routed the people of Ua Ruairc spiritedly, felicitously on that occasion and inflicted the defeat of Ath-Conaill and of the Graine, namely a river that is between Fir-Manach and the Breifne, upon them. Mag Uidhir and his people then, returned with spoils joyfully. And the kern of Mag Uidhir carried with them sixteen heads of the nobles of the people of Ua Ruairc to the town of Mag Uidhir and they were placed on the palisade of the court-yard of Mag Uidhir and so on.

The Annals of Loch Cé for the same year state- The victory of the Graine was gained by Mag Uidhir over Lochlainn, the son of Tadhg O'Ruairc, i.e. O'Ruairc.

=== After 1600 ===
The townland formed part of the ballybethagh of Calvagh in medieval times. As it was a border townland the ownership was contested between the McGovern and Maguire clans. At the time of the 1609 Ulster Plantation the townland was overlooked and does not appear on the Plantation Baronial maps. The map for Knockninny barony stops on the east bank of the stream entering the Woodford river between the townlands of Derryhooly and Corry townlands, while the Tullyhaw barony map stops where the Irish border is now, thus omitting that part of Tomregan parish which lies in County Fermanagh. The mapping of Fermanagh and Cavan only took about 10 days each, which was insufficient time to make a proper survey. A different surveyor was sent into each barony to draw up his own map so the error probably arose because the surveyor who drew the Knockninny map assumed the omitted townlands were in County Cavan and the Tullyhaw surveyor who was probably a different man then assumed the lands were in County Fermanagh. Taking advantage of this oversight, Lady Margaret O’Neill, the widow of Hugh Maguire (Lord of Fermanagh) claimed the land. An order of the Lord Deputy dated 14 October 1612 states- Whereas The Lady Margrett ny Neale, wyddowe, late wyfe to Sir Hugh Maguyre knight deceased, hath discovered the parcells of land beinge eight tates, and doe lye betweene Knockneny in the County of Fermanagh and Tollagh in the County of Cavan and not within anie Undertakers portion who have since enjoyed the same as it hath been certified by the Surveyors ... we enact that the said Lady Margrett shall receive the next Hallowtyde rent due out of the said eight tates and thence forth until his Majesty decides otherwise. The eight tates included one tate of Gortmeddan with the appurtenances. What happened next is unclear as James Trayle, who had been granted the nearby manor of Dresternan in 1610, began making leases of the lands in 1613. So either he had received a grant from the king or Lady Margaret sold or leased the land to him. In any event on 1 May 1613 he leased land in the area to Thomas Duffe McCorie, a mere Irishman for the term of one year. On 4 August 1615 Trayle leased the entire manor to Sir Stephen Butler, the owner of the nearby manor of Dernglush at Belturbet. Butler then sub-leased the manor to the owner of the adjoining manor of Aghalane, George Adwick. The land was farmed by the Irish natives on yearly tenancies from these proprietors. A survey in 1622 found that- The land was left wholly to ye Irish, it being farr out of the way. Butler then took back possession from Adwick and sold his interest to James Balfour, 1st Baron Balfour of Glenawley. The rent rolls from the Balfour estate in the 1630s do not mention Gortineddan. An Inquisition held in Newtownbutler on 23 March 1639 found that the said James Balfour owned, inter alia, the lands of 1 tate of Gartnedan. Pender's Census of 1659 spells the name as Gortened and states there were 4 people over the age of 15 living in the townland, all Irish, (In general the percentage of the Irish population aged under 15 runs at about 20% so the total population of Gortineddan in 1659 would have been roughly about 5). A grant dated 8 December 1675 to Charles Balfour of Castle Balfour, included, inter alia, the lands of Gartnedan. A lease dated 28 July 1721 from William Balfour to Hugh Henry includes, inter alia, the lands of Gortnadan.

In July 1751 no residents were entitled to vote in the townland.

In the Fermanagh Poll of Electors 1788 there were two Gortineddan landowners entitled to vote, Robert Hewitt and David Ross.

The Tithe Applotment Books for 1827 list the following tithepayers in the townland- McGee, Bennet, Theackle, Donahy, Elliott, Whittendale, Reilly, McKiernan, Montgomery.

In 1829 a Sunday school was kept in the townland, funded by the Hibernian Sunday School Society.

The Gortineddan Valuation Office Field books are available for May 1836.

The Irish Famine had an impact on the district. A letter from Rector John Frith of Tomregan parish dated 5 December 1846 to the Office of Public Works, stated there were 130 destitute people in the Fermanagh part of Tomregan. As a result additional works were ordered including- £30 towards repairing 236 perches of narrow road from Drumderg ford to the oak wood, through Drumderg and Gortanedon.

Griffith's Valuation of 1857 lists twenty-three occupiers in the townland. The landlord of Gortineddan in the 1850s was the Enery estate, the proprietors of Ballyconnell Castle.

30 August 1963 - RTE interviews in the townland.

== Census ==
Year	Population	Males	Females	Total Houses	Uninhabited
1841	123	60	63	28	2
1851	103	47	56	20	1
1861	88	45	43	19	1
1871	66	34	32	15	0
1881	59	28	31	12	0
1891	62	36	26	12	2

In the 1901 census of Ireland, there are thirteen families listed in the townland.

In the 1911 census of Ireland, there are fourteen families listed in the townland.

== Antiquities ==
1. A medieval earthen ringfort or cashel. An archaeological survey close to it did not find anything.
2. The international border crossing with the Republic of Ireland.
3. The ruins of Oakhill and Oakwood schoolhouses. Gortineddan Hedge School. In 1826 the headmaster was a Roman Catholic, Edward McCorry, who was paid £11 per annum. It was held in a barn valued at £7. There were 60 pupils, 37 boys and 23 girls, of whom 38 were Roman Catholic and 22 were Church of Ireland. The school was supported by the London Hibernian Society and the local Protestant rector contributed £2 per annum. Another school was established in 1835. The headmaster was Thomas Emo, who taught reading, writing, arithmetic and sewing. There were 113 pupils, 65 boys and 48 girls. The teacher received grants from the Kildare Place Society, £14 annual subscription and payments of 1s per quarter.
4. Gortineddan Protestant Sunday School. The Sunday School Society for 1829 quotes from a letter received about Gortaneddan, County of Fermanagh: The spirit of genuine Christianity has, however, rapidly diffused itself, during the same period, amongst those of the Protestant community. Our congregations have wonderfully increased, our monthly sacraments much better attended, and in fine, forgetful of their minor and comparatively unimportant differences, the Protestants of all classes in the neighbourhood seem at length desirous to hold the faith in unity of spirit, in the bond of peace, and in the righteousness of life.
