= Knockateggal =

Townland in County Fermanagh, Northern Ireland

Knockateggal is a townland in the Civil Parish of Tomregan, Barony of Knockninny, County Fermanagh, Northern Ireland.

== Etymology ==
The townland name is an anglicisation of the Gaelic placename "Cnoc-a'-tSeagail" which means 'Hill of the Rye'. The oldest surviving mention of the name is in a grant dated 14 October 1612 where it is spelled 'Knockshogill'. Spellings in later documents are- 1613 Knocktegall; 1629 Knocktegall; 1639 Cnottitagill; 1675 Knocktegall and 1751 Knockategal.

== Geography ==
It is bounded on the north by Gortahurk and Gortaree townlands, on the east by Ummera and Gortmullan townlands and on the south and west by the international border with County Cavan and the Republic of Ireland. Its chief geographical features are the Slieve Rushen mountain on whose eastern slope it lies reaching an altitude of 320 metres above sea-level and some swallow-holes. The townland is traversed by the B127 Border Road to Ballyconnell and some mountain lanes. Knockateggal covers an area of 271 acres (1.10 km^{2}) statute.

== History ==
The townland formed part of the ballybethagh of Calvagh in medieval times. As it was a border townland, the ownership was contested between the McGovern and Maguire clans. At the time of the 1609 Ulster Plantation the townland was overlooked and does not appear on the Plantation Baronial maps. The map for Knockninny barony stops on the east bank of the stream entering the Woodford river between the townlands of Derryhooly and Corry townlands, while the Tullyhaw barony map stops where the Irish border is now, thus omitting that part of Tomregan parish which lies in County Fermanagh. The mapping of Fermanagh and Cavan only took about 10 days each, which was an insufficient time to make a proper survey. A different surveyor was sent into each barony to draw up his own map so the error probably arose because the surveyor who drew the Knockninny map assumed the omitted townlands were in County Cavan and the Tullyhaw surveyor who was probably a different man then assumed the lands were in County Fermanagh. Taking advantage of this oversight, Lady Margaret O’Neill, the widow of Hugh Maguire (Lord of Fermanagh) claimed the land. An order of the Lord Deputy dated 14 October 1612 states- Wheras The Lady Margrett ny Neale, wyddowe, late wyfe to Sir Hugh Maguyre knight deceased, hath discovered the parcells of land beinge eight tates, and doe lye betweene Knockneny in the County of Fermanagh and Tollagh in the County of Cavan and not within anie Undertakers portion who have since enjoyed the same as it hath been certified by the Surveyors ... we enact that the said Lady Margrett shall receive the next Hallowtyde rent due out of the said eight tates and thence forth until his Majesty decides otherwise. The eight tates included one tate of Tylltin alias Siltin & Knockshogill. What happened next is unclear as James Trayle, who had been granted the nearby manor of Dresternan in 1610, began making leases of the lands in 1613. So either he had received a grant from the king or he squatted on the land or Lady Margaret transferred her interest to him. In any event on 1 May 1613 he leased to lands of, inter alia, Knocktegall to Thomas Duffe McCorie, a mere Irishman for the term of one year. On 4 August 1615 Trayle leased the entire manor to Sir Stephen Butler, the owner of the nearby manor of Dernglush at Belturbet. Butler then sub-leased the manor to George Adwick, the step-father of the owner of the adjoining manor of Aghalane, David Creighton, who was still a minor. The land was farmed by the Irish natives on yearly tenancies from these proprietors. A survey in 1622 found that - The land was left wholly to ye Irish, it being farr out of the way. Butler then took back possession from Adwick and sold his interest to James Balfour, 1st Baron Balfour of Glenawley. The rent rolls from the Balfour estate in the 1630s do not mention Knockateggal. An Inquisition held in Newtownbutler on 23 March 1639 found that the said James Balfour owned, inter alia, the lands of Cnottitagill. A grant dated 8 December 1675 to Charles Balfour of Castle Balfour, included, inter alia, the lands of Knocktegall.

On 15 July 1751 the only residents entitled to vote in the Fermanagh elections were Edward Elliott and James Elliot, both of Knockategal.

In the Cavan Poll Book of 1761 there was one Knockateggal resident, James Elliot, who was entitled to vote in the Irish general election, 1761 because he owned land in Drumroe townland in Killeshandra parish. He was entitled to cast two votes. The four election candidates were Charles Coote, 1st Earl of Bellomont and Lord Newtownbutler (later Brinsley Butler, 2nd Earl of Lanesborough), both of whom were then elected Member of Parliament for Cavan County. The losing candidates were George Montgomery (MP) of Ballyconnell and Barry Maxwell, 1st Earl of Farnham.

The Tithe Applotment Books for 1827 list the following tithepayers in the townland- Elliott, Emo, Prior, Clerk, McGuire, Curry, Drum, Beatty.

The Knockateggal Valuation Office Field books are available for May 1836.

Griffith's Valuation of 1857 lists twenty-eight occupiers in the townland. The landlord of Knockateggal in the 1850s was Robert Collins.

== Census ==
| Year | Population | Males | Females | Total Houses | Uninhabited |
|---|---|---|---|---|---|
| 1841 | 91 | 50 | 41 | 17 | 1 |
| 1851 | 59 | 31 | 28 | 12 | 0 |
| 1861 | 48 | 25 | 23 | 12 | 1 |
| 1871 | 35 | 15 | 20 | 7 | 0 |
| 1881 | 26 | 14 | 12 | 5 | 0 |
| 1891 | 28 | 12 | 16 | 8 | 2 |

In the 1901 census of Ireland, there are eight families listed in the townland.

In the 1911 census of Ireland, there are seven families listed in the townland.

== Antiquities ==
The historic sites in the townland are some old stone quarries and Teamneall na Regan (alias Temple na Regan or Teampall Regan which means 'The Church of Tomregan') or Templegurry, which means the 'Church belonging to Curry', in Tom Donohoe's land. This was originally a medieval Roman Catholic church which served the inhabitants of Tomregan Parish who lived in County Fermanagh. After the Ulster Plantation of 1609 it was converted to Protestant worship. Local tradition states there was a graveyard around it. Rectangular ruins can be seen. A story found in the Dúchas School's Collection by Mr P. Gallen in 1938 gives more details.

A hill in the adjoining townland of Aughrim, County Cavan is called 'Church Hill' and may have belonged to Knockateggal church in medieval times.
