= Ummera =

Land unit in County Fermanagh, Northern Ireland

- Townland
- Interactive map of Ummera
- Country: Ireland

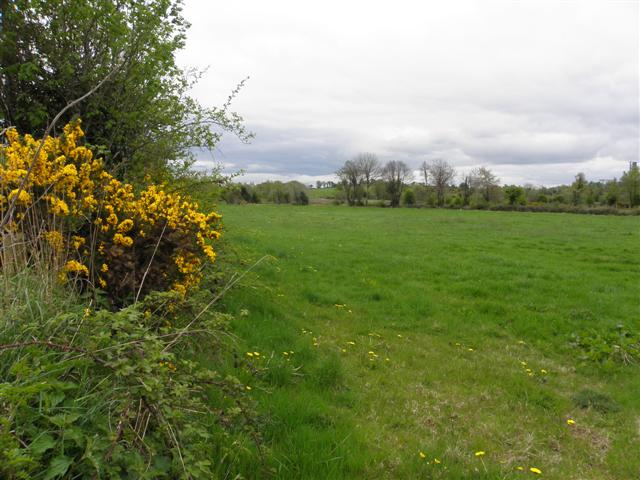
Ummera townland, Tomregan, County Fermanagh, Northern Ireland, looking south-east.

Ummera is a townland in the Civil Parish of Tomregan, Barony of Knockninny, County Fermanagh, Northern Ireland.

== Etymology ==
The townland name is an anglicisation of the Gaelic placename- "An t-Iomaire" which means 'The Hill-Ridge' (referring to the drumlin hill in the townland). The older placename spellings include the initial 't' but it was dropped by the 1820s. The oldest surviving mention of the name is in a grant dated 14 October 1612 where it is spelled 'Taumory'. Spellings in later documents are- 1630 Tomery; 1639 Temnery; 1675 Tumerie; 1721 Temerie and 1827 Umera.

== Geography ==
It is bounded on the north by Gortaree townland, on the east by Aghindisert and Drumderg townlands, on the south by Gortineddan townland and on the west by Gortmullan and Knockateggal townlands. Its chief geographical feature is a drumlin hill reaching to 60 metres above sea-level. The townland is traversed by the B127 Border Road to Ballyconnell and the C431 Teemore Road. Ummera covers an area of 107 statute acres.

== History ==
The townland formed part of the ballybetagh of Calvagh in medieval times. As it was a border townland the ownership was contested between the McGovern and Maguire clans. At the time of the 1609 Ulster Plantation the townland was overlooked and does not appear on the Plantation Baronial maps. The map for Knockninny barony stops on the east bank of the stream entering the Woodford river between the townlands of Derryhooly and Corry townlands, while the Tullyhaw barony map stops where the Irish border is now, thus omitting that part of Tomregan parish which lies in County Fermanagh. The mapping of Fermanagh and Cavan only took about 10 days each, which was insufficient time to make a proper survey. A different surveyor was sent into each barony to draw up his own map so the error probably arose because the surveyor who drew the Knockninny map assumed the omitted townlands were in County Cavan and the Tullyhaw surveyor who was probably a different man then assumed the lands were in County Fermanagh. This confusion lasted a few years. Taking advantage of this, Lady Margaret O’Neill, the widow of Hugh Maguire (Lord of Fermanagh) claimed the land. An order of the Lord Deputy dated 14 October 1612 states- Wheras The Lady Margrett ny Neale, wyddowe, late wyfe to Sir Hugh Maguyre knight deceased, hath discovered the parcells of land beinge eight tates, and doe lye betweene Knockneny in the County of Fermanagh and Tollagh in the County of Cavan and not within anie Undertakers portion who have since enjoyed the same as it hath been certified by the Surveyors ... we enact that the said Lady Margrett shall receive the next Hallowtyde rent due out of the said eight tates and thence forth until his Majesty decides otherwise. The eight tates included one tate of Taumory. An Inquisition held at Newtownbutler on 20 January 1630 stated that Sir Stephen Butler owned, inter alia, 1 tate of Tomery. An Inquisition held at Netownbutler on 23 March 1639 stated that James Balfour owned, inter alia, 1 tate of Temnery. A grant dated 8 December 1675 to Charles Balfour of Castle Balfour, included, inter alia, the lands of Tumerie. A lease dated 28 July 1721 from William Balfour to Hugh Henry includes, inter alia, the lands of Temerie.

In July 1751 no residents were entitled to vote in the townland.

The Tithe Applotment Books for 1827 (which spell it as Umera) list the following tithepayers in the townland- McKenna, Crawford, Cosgrove, Wallace, Ross, McGee.

The Ummera Valuation Office Field books are available for May 1836.

Griffith's Valuation of 1857 lists twelve occupiers in the townland. The landlord of Ummera in the 1850s was Robert Collins, M.D., of Garvary Lodge.

== Census ==
Year	Population	Males	Females	Total Houses	Uninhabited
1841	81	40	41	13	0
1851	56	30	26	10	0
1861	46	20	26	11	1
1871	59	28	31	10	0
1881	50	22	28	10	0
1891	55	27	28	9	0

In the 1901 census of Ireland, there are ten families listed in the townland.

In the 1911 census of Ireland, there are nine families listed in the townland.

== Antiquities ==
There are no historic sites in the townland.
