= Tonymore =

Land unit in Northern Ireland

Tonymore is a townland in the Civil Parish of Tomregan, Barony of Knockninny, County Fermanagh, Northern Ireland.

== Etymology ==
The townland name is an anglicisation of the Gaelic placename "Tamhnaigh Mór" which means 'The Big Pasture'. Another meaning which has been suggested is "Tonnaigh Mór" which means 'The Big Rampart'. The oldest surviving mention of the name is in Ambrose Leet's 1814 Directory which spells it as Tonymore. The townland is sometimes confused with the similarly named townland of Tonymore in Kinawley parish, a few miles to the south-east along the Woodford river.

== Geography ==
It is bounded on the north by Aghyoule townland, on the east by Gortaree townland, on the south by Gortahurk townland and on the west by the international border with County Cavan and the Republic of Ireland. Its chief geographical features are several springs, mountain streams with several waterfalls, Tonymore Hill and Slieve Rushen mountain on whose eastern slope it lies reaching to an altitude of 1,269 feet above sea-level. The townland is traversed by mountain lanes. Tonymore covers an area of 443 statute acres.

== History ==
The townland formed part of the ballybethagh of Calvagh in medieval times. As it was a border townland the ownership was contested between the McGovern and Maguire clans. At the time of the 1609 Ulster Plantation the townland was overlooked and does not appear on the Plantation Baronial maps. The map for Knockninny barony stops on the east bank of the stream entering the Woodford river between the townlands of Derryhooly and Corry townlands, while the Tullyhaw barony map stops where the Irish border is now, thus omitting that part of Tomregan parish which lies in County Fermanagh. The mapping of Fermanagh and Cavan only took about 10 days each, which was insufficient time to make a proper survey. A different surveyor was sent into each barony to draw up his own map so the error probably arose because the surveyor who drew the Knockninny map assumed the omitted townlands were in County Cavan and the Tullyhaw surveyor who was probably a different man then assumed the lands were in County Fermanagh. As it was on the top of Slieve Rushen mountain it would have formed part of lands which were granted to John Sandford of Castle Doe, Co. Donegal by letters patent dated 7 July 1613 (Pat. 11 James I – LXXI – 38, 'Slewrussell'). The grant basically included the top of the mountain only, as the townlands on the lower slopes had already been granted to other grantees in the Plantation, as appear in later grants. The mountain was later sold by Sandford to his wife's (Anne Caulfeild) uncle Toby Caulfeild, 1st Baron Caulfeild, Master of the Ordnance and Caulfield had the sale confirmed by letters patent of 12 July 1620 (Pat. 19 James I. XI. 45 'Slewrussell'). Coincidentally the mountain was later part owned by John Sandford's daughter, Magdalen Gwyllym, the wife of Thomas Gwyllym, the owner of the Ballyconnell estate.

In the 1750s no residents were entitled to vote in the townland.

The Tithe Applotment Books for 1827 (which spell it as Tunnymore) list the following tithepayers in the townland- Rourke, Reily, McCormick, Kellagher, Clarke, Brady, McGauran, Curry, Drum.

The Tonymore Valuation Office Field books are available for May 1836.

Griffith's Valuation of 1862 lists fourteen occupiers in the townland. One of the occupiers Philip Cox was the father or brother of Rose Anna Cox, the great-grandmother of U.S. President John F. Kennedy. Rose married Thomas Fitzgerald in Boston on 15 December 1857. The landlord of Tonymore in the 1850s was Robert Collins.

== Census ==
Year	Population	Males	Females	Total Houses	Uninhabited
1841	86	46	40	18	0
1851	50	27	23	9	0
1861	39	20	19	8	0
1871	48	25	23	8	0
1881	46	26	20	9	0
1891	45	25	20	8	0

In the 1901 census of Ireland, there are nine families listed in the townland.

In the 1911 census of Ireland, there are eight families listed in the townland.

== Antiquities ==
The only historic site in the townland is Carrickbrack.
