= Gortaree =

Townland in County Fermanagh, Northern Ireland

Coordinates: 54.1580°N 7.5708°W

Gortaree is a townland in the Civil Parish of Tomregan, Barony of Knockninny, County Fermanagh, Northern Ireland.

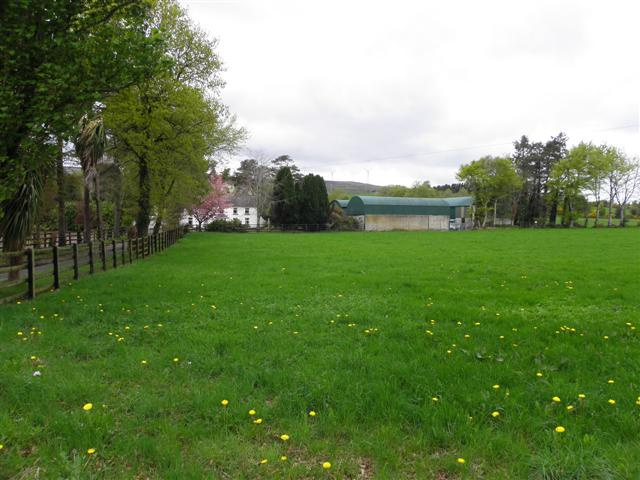
Gortaree townland, Tomregan, County Fermanagh, Northern Ireland, looking west from the Ballyconnell Road.

== Etymology ==
The townland name is an anglicisation of the Gaelic placename "Gort a Righ" which means 'The Field of the King'. The oldest surviving mention of the name is in a grant dated 14 October 1612 where it is spelled 'Gortoerie'. Spellings in later documents include Gortery (1620); Gartaree (1629); Gartharee (1643); Gortery (1659) and Gartaree (1675).

== Geography ==
It is bounded on the north by Aghyoule and Aghintra townlands, on the east by Aghindisert & Derrintony townlands, on the south by Ummera and Knockateggal townlands and on the west by Gortahurk & Tonymore townlands. Its chief geographical features are Slieve Rushen mountain on whose eastern foothills it lies reaching to an altitude of 360 feet above sea-level and some mountain streams. The townland is traversed by the B127 Ballyconnell Road and some minor lanes. Gortaree covers an area of 280 statute acres. A sub-denomination of the townland is called Gorteen (from Irish: Gortín meaning 'A small cultivated field or garden').

== History ==
The townland formed part of the ballybethagh of Calvagh in medieval times. As it was a border townland the ownership was contested between the McGovern and Maguire clans. At the time of the 1609 Ulster Plantation the townland was overlooked and does not appear on the Plantation Baronial maps. The map for Knockninny barony stops on the east bank of the stream entering the Woodford river between the townlands of Derryhooly and Corry townlands, while the Tullyhaw barony map stops where the Irish border is now, thus omitting that part of Tomregan parish which lies in County Fermanagh. The mapping of Fermanagh and Cavan only took about 10 days each, which was insufficient time to make a proper survey. A different surveyor was sent into each barony to draw up his own map so the error probably arose because the surveyor who drew the Knockninny map assumed the omitted townlands were in County Cavan and the Tullyhaw surveyor who was probably a different man then assumed the lands were in County Fermanagh. Taking advantage of this oversight, Lady Margaret O’Neill, the widow of Hugh Maguire (Lord of Fermanagh) claimed the land. An order of the Lord Deputy dated 14 October 1612 states:

"Wheras The Lady Margrett ny Neale, wyddowe, late wyfe to Sir Hugh Maguyre knight deceased, hath discovered the parcells of land beinge eight tates, and doe lye betweene Knockneny in the County of Fermanagh and Tollagh in the County of Cavan and not within anie Undertakers portion who have since enjoyed the same as it hath been certified by the Surveyors ... we enact that the said Lady Margrett shall receive the next Hallowtyde rent due out of the said eight tates and thence forth until his Majesty decides otherwise".

The eight tates included one tate of "Gortoerie & Gortindiraliman". What happened next is unclear as James Trayle, who had been granted the nearby manor of Dresternan in 1610, began making leases of the lands in 1613. So either he had received a grant from the king or Lady Margaret sold or leased the land to him. In any event on 1 May 1613 he began leasing the lands to the native Irish for the term of one year. On 4 August 1615 Trayle leased the entire manor to Sir Stephen Butler, the owner of the nearby manor of Dernglush at Belturbet. Butler then sub-leased the manor to the owner of the adjoining manor of Aghalane, George Adwick. The land was farmed by the Irish natives on yearly tenancies from these proprietors. A survey in 1622 found that "the land was left wholly to ye Irish, it being farr out of the way". Butler then took back possession from Adwick and sold his interest to James Balfour, 1st Baron Balfour of Glenawley, including the lands of Gartaree. The rent rolls from the Balfour estate in the 1630s do not mention Gortaree.

Thomas Wenslowe of Derryvore made the following deposition on 16 January 1643 about the Irish Rebellion of 1641 in Knockninny:

"Thomas Wenslowe of Derryvore in the County of ffermanagh gent, aged 33 yeres or thereabouts, sworne & examined sayth that in the beginning of the present rebellion vizt on or about the 23rd of October 1641, one James Maguire of Knocknynny & Cahill Maguire of the same in the same County gent, both brothers, and John mc Corry of Gartharee in the same County gent, and a great number of other Rebells whose names he cannott expresse, came in hostile manner to this deponentes said house & surprisd and ransacked the same, And forceibly tooke away from him this deponent a great number of his beastes, cattle horses howshold goods & other thinges of the value and to his losse of £300 sterling at the least & expelled him from the possession of his land and farmes worth clerely £35 per annum whereof he accompteth to have lost 3 yeres proffitt wort amounting to £105. And they alsoe dispoyled him of debts & money worth threescore and fiue poundes, And the deponent is like to be deprived of the future proffitts of his said lands & farmes worth £35 per annum clerely untill a peace be established".

Pender's Census of 1659 spells the name as "Gortery" and states there were 2 people over the age of 15 living in the townland, all Irish, (In general the percentage of the Irish population aged under 15 runs at about 20% so presumably there were no under-15s there at the time).

A grant dated 8 December 1675 to Charles Balfour of Castle Balfour, included, inter alia, the lands of "Gartaree".

In July 1751 no residents were entitled to vote in Gortaree.

The Tithe Applotment Books for 1827 list the following tithepayers in the townland: Quinn, Drum, Rooney, Burke, Graves, McGauran, Clarke, McGuire, Wallace.

The Gortaree Valuation Office books are available for May 1836.

Griffith's Valuation of 1857 lists twenty-four occupiers in the townland. The landlord of Gortaree in the 1850s was Robert Collins.

== Census ==
Year	Population	Males	Females	Total Houses	Uninhabited
1841	124	63	61	23	1
1851	96	52	44	18	2
1861	89	46	43	21	2
1871	96	42	54	21	2
1881	84	45	39	16	0
1891	77	39	38	17	1

In the 1901 census of Ireland, there are twenty-two families listed in the townland.

In the 1911 census of Ireland, there are nineteen families listed in the townland.

== Antiquities ==
1. Gortaree Hedge School. In 1826 the headmaster was a Protestant, John Wallace, who was paid £18 per annum. It was described as a lime and stone building valued at £150. There were 56 pupils, 36 boys and 20 girls, of whom 30 were Roman Catholic and 26 were Church of Ireland. The school was supported by the Society for Discountenancing Vice.
2. Gorteen House.
