= Aghindisert =

Townland in County Fermanagh, Northern Ireland

Coordinates: 54.15251°N 7.558762°W

Aghindisert (from Irish Achadh an Dísirt, meaning 'the Field of the Hermitage') is a townland in the civil parish of Tomregan, in County Fermanagh, Northern Ireland. It is situated within the former barony of Knockninny.

== Etymology ==
The oldest surviving mention of the name is in a grant dated 15 October 1610 where it is spelled 'Aghadisart'. Spellings in later documents are- 1612 Aghodisart; 1620 Aghadisert; 1623 Aghadisart; 1629 Aghadisart; 1630 Aghadizarte; 1639 Aghadiserte; 1659 Aghadissartt; 1675 Aghadisart and 1721 Aghadizert.

== Geography ==
It is bounded on the north by Gortaree and Derrintony townlands, on the east by Garvary townland, on the south by Drumderg townland, and on the west by Ummera townland. Its chief geographical feature is a drumlin hill reaching to 70 metres above sea-level. The townland is traversed by the C431 Teemore Road and some minor lanes. Aghindisert covers an area of 168 statute acres.

== History ==
The townland formed part of the ballybethagh of Calvagh in medieval times. As it was a border townland the ownership was contested between the McGovern and Maguire clans. At the time of the 1609 Ulster Plantation the townland was overlooked and does not appear on the Plantation Baronial maps. The map for Knockninny barony stops on the east bank of the stream entering the Woodford river between the townlands of Derryhooly and Corry townlands, while the Tullyhaw barony map stops where the Irish border is now, thus omitting that part of Tomregan parish which lies in County Fermanagh. The mapping of Fermanagh and Cavan only took about 10 days each, which was insufficient time to make a proper survey. A different surveyor was sent into each barony to draw up his own map so the error probably arose because the surveyor who drew the Knockninny map assumed the omitted townlands were in County Cavan and the Tullyhaw surveyor who was probably a different man then assumed the lands were in County Fermanagh. This confusion lasted a few years. Firstly a grant was made to Thomas Monepeny on 15 October 1610 of the Manor of Aghalane, which included one tate of Aghadisart. By 1611 Monepeny had not appeared to take up possession, according to Carew, the King's commissioner. Taking advantage of this, Lady Margaret O’Neill, the widow of Hugh Maguire (Lord of Fermanagh) claimed the land. An order of the Lord Deputy dated 14 October 1612 states- Wheras The Lady Margrett ny Neale, wyddowe, late wyfe to Sir Hugh Maguyre knight deceased, hath discovered the parcells of land beinge eight tates, and doe lye betweene Knockneny in the County of Fermanagh and Tollagh in the County of Cavan and not within anie Undertakers portion who have since enjoyed the same as it hath been certified by the Surveyors ... we enact that the said Lady Margrett shall receive the next Hallowtyde rent due out of the said eight tates and thence forth until his Majesty decides otherwise. The eight tates included one tate of Aghodisart. Lady Margaret then seems to have left the scene because, on 31 July 1613, Thomas Monepeny sold the Manor of Aghalane to Thomas Creighton. Thomas Creighton then died in 1618, and his widow Katherine married George Adwick. The estate descended to Thomas Creighton's son, David Creighton. He was a minor at his father's death so his mother and George Adwick administered the estate on his behalf. An Inquisition held in Enniskillen on 28 February 1623 listed the names of 74 Irish tenants in the Half Barony of Knocknyny, within the great proportion of Bally M'Gillichony, containing 2,000 acres, the proportion of James Lord Balfoure, Baron of Clanawly. An extract in the printed State Papers gives names of 22 of the 74 tenants including- Cormock O'Rely; Caele Boy O'Rely; Tirlagh O'Rely and Teige O'Mulpatrick, all tenants in the tate of Aghadisart. An Inquisition held at Castlecoote on 5 November 1629 stated that David Creighton owned, inter alia, 1 tate of Aghadisart. However, there seems to have been some dispute with Sir Stephen Butler, who owned the adjoining manor, as an Inquisition held at Netownbutler on 20 January 1630 stated that Sir Stephen Butler owned, inter alia, 1 tate of Aghadizarte. An Inquisition held at Netownbutler on 23 March 1639 stated that James Balfour owned, inter alia, 1 tate of Aghadiserte. Pender's Census of 1659 spells the name as Aghadissartt and states there were 2 people over the age of 15 living in the townland, all Irish, (In general the percentage of the Irish population aged under 15 runs at about 20% so there were probably no children under 15 in 1659). A grant dated 8 December 1675 to Charles Balfour of Castle Balfour, included, inter alia, the lands of Aghadisart. A lease dated 28 July 1721 from William Balfour to Hugh Henry includes, inter alia, the lands of Aghadizert.

In July 1751 no residents were entitled to vote in the townland.

The Tithe Applotment Books for 1827 (which spell it as Aughnadizard) list the following tithepayers in the townland- Drum, McAvinue, McGuire.

The Aghindisert Valuation Office Field books are available for May 1836.

Griffith's Valuation of 1857 lists sixteen occupiers in the townland. The landlord of Aghindisert in the 1850s was Robert Collins.

== Census ==
Year	Population	Males	Females	Total Houses	Uninhabited
1841	60	30	31	9	0
1851	47	26	21	9	2
1861	44	18	26	8	0
1871	49	25	24	9	0
1881	45	23	22	9	0
1891	41	20	21	9	0

In the 1901 census of Ireland, there are thirteen families listed in the townland.

In the 1911 census of Ireland, there are thirteen families listed in the townland.

== Antiquities ==
There are no historic sites in the townland apart from the Early-Christian hermitage whose location is unknown but was probably on the hilltop.
