= Gortahurk, Tomregan civil parish =

Townland in County Fermanagh, Northern Ireland

Gortahurk (from Irish Gort an Choirce, meaning 'field of the oats'), is a townland in the civil parish of Tomregan, County Fermanagh, Northern Ireland. It was also part of the barony of Knockninny.

== Etymology ==
The oldest surviving mention of the name is in a grant dated 1620 where it is spelled 'Gortkorky'. Spellings in later documents are 1630 - Gortequirka; 1639 - Gortecorkery; 1659 – Gortecorke and 1675 - Gartnaquorkee.

== Geography ==
Gortahurk is bounded by the townlands of Tonymore, Gortaree, and Knockateggal and borders County Cavan in the Republic of Ireland to its west. Its chief geographical features are Slieve Rushen mountain on whose eastern slope it lies reaching to an altitude of 359 metres above sea-level and some mountain streams. Gortahurk covers an area of 390 statute acres.

== History ==
The townland formed part of the ballybethagh of Calvagh in medieval times. As it was a border townland the ownership was contested between the McGovern and Maguire clans. At the time of the 1609 Ulster Plantation the townland was overlooked and does not appear on the Plantation Baronial maps. The map for Knockninny barony stops on the east bank of the stream entering the Woodford river between the townlands of Derryhooly and Corry townlands, while the Tullyhaw barony map stops where the Irish border is now, thus omitting that part of Tomregan parish which lies in County Fermanagh. The mapping of Fermanagh and Cavan only took about 10 days each, which was insufficient time to make a proper survey. A different surveyor was sent into each barony to draw up his own map so the error probably arose because the surveyor who drew the Knockninny map assumed the omitted townlands were in County Cavan and the Tullyhaw surveyor who was probably a different man then assumed the lands were in County Fermanagh. What happened next is unclear as James Trayle, who had been granted the nearby manor of Dresternan in 1610, began making leases of the lands in 1613. So either he had received a grant from the king or he just squatted on it. In any event on 1 May 1613 he began making leases to the native Irish for the term of one year. On 4 August 1615 Trayle leased the entire manor to Sir Stephen Butler, the owner of the nearby manor of Dernglush at Belturbet. Butler then sub-leased the manor to George Adwick, the step-father of the owner of the adjoining manor of Aghalane, David Creighton, who was still a minor. The land was farmed by the Irish natives on yearly tenancies from these proprietors. A survey in 1622 found that- The land was left wholly to ye Irish, it being farr out of the way. Butler then took back possession from Adwick. An Inquisition held in Newtownbutler on 29 January 1630 found that Butler owned the lands of, inter alia, Gortequirka. He then sold his interest in, inter alia, Gortequirka to James Balfour, 1st Baron Balfour of Glenawley. The rent rolls from the Balfour estate in the 1630s do not mention Gortahurk. An Inquisition held in Newtownbutler on 23 March 1639 found that the said James Balfour owned, inter alia, the lands of Gortecorkery. A grant dated 8 December 1675 to Charles Balfour of Castle Balfour, included, inter alia, the lands of Gartnaquorkee.

Pender's Census of 1659 spells the name as Gortecorke and states there were 8 people over the age of 15 living in the townland, all Irish, (In general the percentage of the Irish population aged under 15 runs at about 20% so presumably the total population in 1659 was roughly 10).

In the 1750s no residents were entitled to vote in the townland. The list of electors in Gortahurk actually referred to the townlands of Gortahurk East and Gortahurk West in Cleenish parish.

The Tithe Applotment Books for 1827 list the following tithepayers in the townland- Drum, Connolly, McGauran, O'Neill, Moran, Caffrey, Clarke, Reilly.

The Gortahurk Valuation Office Field books are available for May 1836.

Griffith's Valuation of 1857 lists thirty-eight occupiers in the townland. The landlord of Gortahurk in the 1850s was Robert Collins.

== Census ==
Year	Population	Males	Females	Total Houses	Uninhabited
1841	107	58	49	18	0
1851	74	36	38	15	0
1861	74	36	38	15	0
1871	49	24	25	14	1
1881	42	15	27	11	0
1891	37	17	20	10	1

In the 1901 census of Ireland, there are eight families listed in the townland.

In the 1911 census of Ireland, there are eight families listed in the townland.

== Antiquities ==
The only historic sites in the townland are some old freestone quarries.
