= Cloncoohy =

Townland in County Fermanagh, Northern Ireland

Cloncoohy is a townland in the Civil Parish of Tomregan, Barony of Knockninny, County Fermanagh, Northern Ireland.

== Etymology ==
The townland name is an anglicisation of the Gaelic placename "Cluain Cuaiche" which means 'The Meadow of the Cuckoo'. The earliest surviving mention of the name is in a grant dated 8 December 1675 where it is spelled Cloncui.

== Geography ==
It is bounded on the north by Carickaleese and Dernagore townlands and on the east, south and west by the international border with County Cavan and the Republic of Ireland. Its chief geographical features are Cloncoohy Lough, the Shannon-Erne Waterway and a drumlin hill reaching to 60 metres above sea-level. The townland is traversed by Cloncoohy Lane. Cloncoohy covers an area of 105 statute acres.

== History ==
The townland formed part of the ballybethagh of Calvagh in medieval times. As it was a border townland the ownership was contested between the McGovern and Maguire clans. At the time of the 1609 Ulster Plantation the townland was overlooked and does not appear on the Plantation Baronial maps. The map for Knockninny barony stops on the east bank of the stream entering the Woodford river between the townlands of Derryhooly and Corry townlands, while the Tullyhaw barony map stops where the Irish border is now, thus omitting that part of Tomregan parish which lies in County Fermanagh. The mapping of Fermanagh and Cavan only took about 10 days each, which was insufficient time to make a proper survey. A different surveyor was sent into each barony to draw up his own map so the error probably arose because the surveyor who drew the Knockninny map assumed the omitted townlands were in County Cavan and the Tullyhaw surveyor who was probably a different man then assumed the lands were in County Fermanagh. A grant dated 8 December 1675 to Charles Balfour of Castle Balfour, included, inter alia, the lands of Cloncui.

In July 1751 no residents were entitled to vote in the townland.

Ambrose Leet's 1814 Directory spells the name as Clencoohy.

A list of apothecaries or pharmacists registered to run a chemist's shop in Ireland includes Edward Reilly of Clincoohy, Fermanagh, who was licensed on 18 November 1814.

The Tithe Applotment Books for 1827 (which spell is as Clincoohy) list the tithepayers in the townland as- Murphy, McKenna, Reilly.

The Cloncoohy Valuation Office Field books are available for May 1836.

The Irish Famine had an impact on the district. A letter from Rector John Frith of Tomregan parish dated 5 December 1846 to the Office of Public Works, stated there were 130 destitute people in the Fermanagh part of Tomregan. As a result, additional works were ordered including £100 towards repairing 136 perches of bridle road from Clincoohy to the main road leading to Ballyconnell, also 96 perches of new line across Carrickaleese bog & 80 perches of bridle road.

Griffith's Valuation of 1857 lists ten occupiers in the townland. The landlord of Cloncoohy in the 1850s was the Enery estate, the proprietors of Ballyconnell Castle.

== Census ==
Year	Population	Males	Females	Total Houses	Uninhabited
1841	83	39	44	13	0
1851	80	38	42	11	0
1861	50	23	27	9	0
1871	36	18	18	8	0
1881	35	16	19	8	0
1891	30	14	16	8	0

In the 1901 census of Ireland, there are nine families listed in the townland.

In the 1911 census of Ireland, there are eight families listed in the townland.

== Antiquities ==
The only historic site in the townland is Cloncoohy Bridge.
