= Gortmullan =

Townland in County Fermanagh, Northern Ireland

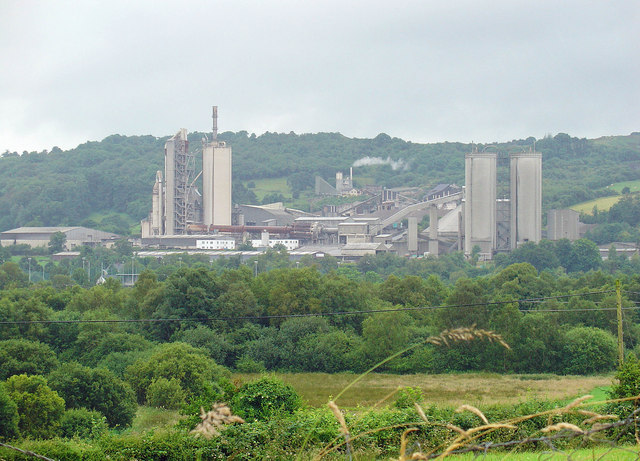
Derrylin cement plant

Gortmullan, or Gortmullen, is a townland in the Civil Parish of Tomregan, Barony of Knockninny, County Fermanagh, Northern Ireland.

== Etymology ==
The townland name is an anglicisation of a Gaelic placename, either Gort Mhaoláin, meaning 'Maolán's Field', or Gort Mullán, meaning 'The Field of the Little Summit'. The oldest surviving mention of the name is in a grant dated 14 October 1612, where it is spelled 'Gortmonylan'. Spellings in later documents are: 1629 Gartmolan; 1639 Gartmullan; 1659 Gorttmoylan; 1675 Gartmullan and 1751 Gortmullan. Ambrose Leet's 1814 Directory spells the name as Gortmullen.

== Geography ==
It is bounded on the north & west by Knockateggal townland, on the east by Ummera & Gortineddan townlands and on the south by the international border with County Cavan and the Republic of Ireland. Its chief geographical feature is Slieve Rushen mountain on whose eastern slope it lies reaching to an altitude of 270 metres above sea-level. The townland is traversed by the B127 Border Road to Ballyconnell and some minor lanes. Gortmullan covers an area of 315 statute acres.

== History ==
The townland formed part of the ballybethagh of Calvagh in medieval times. As it was a border townland the ownership was contested between the McGovern and Maguire clans. At the time of the 1609 Ulster Plantation the townland was overlooked and does not appear on the Plantation Baronial maps. The map for Knockninny barony stops on the east bank of the stream entering the Woodford river between the townlands of Derryhooly and Corry townlands, while the Tullyhaw barony map stops where the Irish border is now, thus omitting that part of Tomregan parish which lies in County Fermanagh. The mapping of Fermanagh and Cavan only took about 10 days each, which was insufficient time to make a proper survey. A different surveyor was sent into each barony to draw up his own map so the error probably arose because the surveyor who drew the Knockninny map assumed the omitted townlands were in County Cavan and the Tullyhaw surveyor who was probably a different man then assumed the lands were in County Fermanagh. Taking advantage of this oversight, Lady Margaret O’Neill, the widow of Hugh Maguire (Lord of Fermanagh) claimed the land. An order of the Lord Deputy dated 14 October 1612 states- Wheras The Lady Margrett ny Neale, wyddowe, late wyfe to Sir Hugh Maguyre knight deceased, hath discovered the parcells of land beinge eight tates, and doe lye betweene Knockneny in the County of Fermanagh and Tollagh in the County of Cavan and not within anie Undertakers portion who have since enjoyed the same as it hath been certified by the Surveyors ... we enact that the said Lady Margrett shall receive the next Hallowtyde rent due out of the said eight tates and thence forth until his Majesty decides otherwise. The eight tates included one tate of Gortanvelly & Gortmonylan. What happened next is unclear as James Trayle, who had been granted the nearby manor of Dresternan in 1610, began making leases of the lands in 1613. So either he had received a grant from the king or Lady Margaret sold or leased the land to him. In any event on 1 May 1613 he leased to lands of, inter alia, Gartevallie & Gartmolan to Thomas Duffe McCorie, a mere Irishman for the term of one year. On 4 August 1615 Trayle leased the entire manor to Sir Stephen Butler, the owner of the nearby manor of Dernglush at Belturbet. Butler then sub-leased the manor to the owner of the adjoining manor of Aghalane, George Adwick. The land was farmed by the Irish natives on yearly tenancies from these proprietors. A survey in 1622 found that- The land was left wholly to ye Irish, it being farr out of the way. Butler then took back possession from Adwick and sold his interest to James Balfour, 1st Baron Balfour of Glenawley. The rent rolls from the Balfour estate in the 1630s do not mention Gortmullan. An Inquisition held in Newtownbutler on 23 March 1639 found that the said James Balfour owned, inter alia, the lands of Gartivallicke & Gartmullan. Pender's Census of 1659 spells the name as Gorttmoylan and states there were 6 people over the age of 15 living in the townland, all Irish, (In general the percentage of the Irish population aged under 15 runs at about 20% so the total population of Gortmullan in 1659 would have been roughly about 8). A grant dated 8 December 1675 to Charles Balfour of Castle Balfour, included, inter alia, the lands of Gartevelly & Gartmullan.

In July 1751 the only residents entitled to vote were Christopher Whitendale and Edward Whitendall, both of Gortmullan.

In the Cavan Poll Book of 1761, there was one person registered to vote in Gortmullan in the Irish general election, 1761: Francis Graves. He was entitled to cast two votes. The four election candidates were Charles Coote, 1st Earl of Bellomont and Lord Newtownbutler (later Brinsley Butler, 2nd Earl of Lanesborough), both of whom were then elected Member of Parliament for Cavan County. The losing candidates were George Montgomery (MP) of Ballyconnell and Barry Maxwell, 1st Earl of Farnham. Absence from the poll book either meant a resident did not vote or, more likely, was not a freeholder entitled to vote, which would mean most of the inhabitants of Gortmullan.

The Tithe Applotment Books for 1827 list the following tithepayers in the townland- Kiernan, Prior, Drum, McGuire, Bennett, Farrell, McGauran, Lauder, Whittendale, Clarke, Thompson.

The Gortmullan Valuation Office Field books are available for May 1836.

The Irish Famine had an impact on the district. A letter from Rector John Frith of Tomregan parish dated 5 December 1846 to the Office of Public Works, stated there were 130 destitute people in the Fermanagh part of Tomregan. As a result, additional works were ordered including £30 towards repairing 290 perches of a bridle road through Gortmallan commencing at the cross roads leading to Belturbet and ending at the top of the mountain bog.

Griffith's Valuation of 1857 lists thirty-one occupiers in the townland. The landlord of Gortmullan in the 1850s was the Enery estate, the proprietors of Ballyconnell Castle.

The Outsider, is a book about growing up in Gortmullan in the 1950s by Peter Quinn.

== Census ==
Year	Population	Males	Females	Total Houses	Uninhabited
1841	112	53	59	21	0
1851	95	47	48	18	1
1861	108	51	57	19	0
1871	82	44	38	16	1
1881	70	44	26	14	1
1891	83	41	42	14	0

In the 1901 census of Ireland, there are fourteen families listed in the townland.

In the 1911 census of Ireland, there are eighteen families listed in the townland.

== Antiquities ==
The only historic sites in the townland are some stone quarries.

== Notable people ==
- Peter Quinn, former president of the Gaelic Athletic Association
