= Aughrim, County Cavan =

Townland in County Cavan, Ireland

Coordinates: 54°08′17″N 7°35′10″W

Aughrim is a townland in the Parish of Tomregan, Barony of Tullyhaw, County Cavan, Ireland.

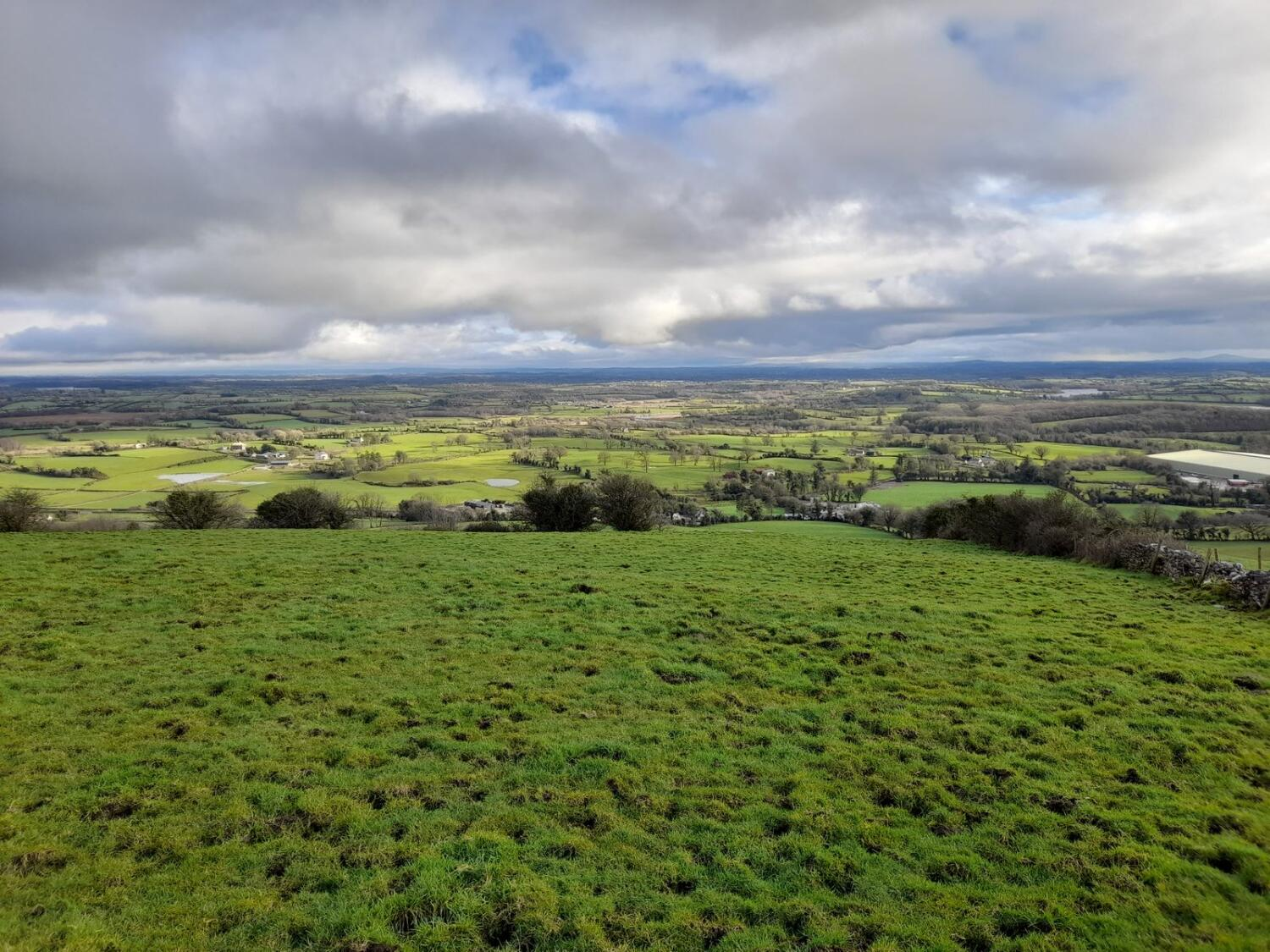

== Etymology ==
The townland name is an anglicisation of the Gaelic placename Each Druim which means 'Horse Hill'. The oldest surviving mention of the name is in the Fiants of Queen Elizabeth I (No. 4813) dated 19 January 1586 where it is spelled Augherym. The 1609 Ulster Plantation map spells the name as Aghrim. The 1652 Commonwealth Survey spells it as Aghrom. The 1659 Down Survey map spells it as Agharim. The 1663 Hearth Money Rolls spell it as Aghrym. William Petty's 1685 map spells it as Agharin. The 1790 Cavan Carvaghs list spells the name as Aghrim. Ambrose Leet's 1814 Directory spells the name as Aharim.

== Geography ==
It is bounded on the north and east by the county boundary with County Fermanagh in Northern Ireland, on the south by Gortawee and Mucklagh townlands, and on the west by Snugborough townland. Its chief geographical features are swallow holes, limestone caves containing stalactites including Pollnagollum Cave and Slieve Rushen mountain, on whose south-eastern slope it lies, reaching an altitude of 1,005 feet above sea-level. The townland is traversed by Aughrim Lane. Aughrim covers an area of 247 statute acres.

A quarry serving the Mannok (formerly Quinn Building Products) company is located approximately in the centre of the townland and extends across the county boundary into Gortmullan townland in County Fermanagh.

== History ==
The occupiers of the townland in 1586 were Garrett McGovern, son of Edmund McGovern and grandson of Sean Glas McGovern and also Giolla Ruadh McGovern, son of the above Garrett McGovern, both receiving a pardon for fighting against the Queen's forces in the Fiants of Queen Elizabeth I (No. 4813) dated 19 January 1586. However, the land seemed to belong to the Catholic Church as it did not form part of the original Plantation of Ulster grants and was reserved for the Protestant Church (the lands of Aughrin granted to the Culme family referred to the townland of Aughrim in Drumreilly parish which formed part of the Dougbally Manor beside Dowra, which was granted to Hugh Culme in 1610). By Letters Patent dated 25 January 1627, Aughrim was granted to Martin Baxter, the first Church of Ireland rector of Tomregan parish, and since then it passed down as part of the glebe lands belonging to the Rectory of Tomregan. A hill in the townland is named 'Church Hill', either in honour of this ownership or because it originally belonged to the medieval Catholic church in the adjoining townland of Knockateggal. The 1652 Commonwealth Survey lists the townland as belonging to the Cromwellian Commonwealth of England and the tenant as Dun Magawran, who was probably a descendant of the 1586 occupiers.

In the Hearth Money Rolls compiled on 29 September 1663, there were four Hearth Tax payers in Aghrym- Owen McGillehooly, Cormucke Magawran, Manus McCanany and Patricke White, all of whom had one hearth.

The Tithe Applotment Books for 1827 list the following tithepayers in the townland- Donohoe, Francis, Prior, Reilly, Cusker, Heavey, Clerk, Drum.

The Aughrim Valuation Office Field books are available for February 1840.

Griffith's Valuation of 1857 lists the landlord of the townland as the Reverend Henry James Erskine and the tenants as Drum, Reilly, Prior, O’Donnell, Donohoe, McTeague and Heavy. The Rev. Erskine was rector of Tomregan at the time which shows the townland still belonged to Tomregan Church.

In the Dúchas School's Collection at a story by Mr J. McCabe in 1938 relates a fairytale that occurred in Aughrim. Another such story in the same collection by Mr P. Gallen, Aughrim at and about a hidden treasure at the prehistoric wedge tomb. The collection also relates stories of Mass being said in the caves of Aughrim under the Penal Laws (Ireland).

== Census ==
Year	Population	Males	Females	Total Houses	Uninhabited
1841	74	45	29	10	0
1851	44	26	18	9	0
1861	37	20	17	10	0
1871	37	17	20	8	0
1881	45	26	19	9	0
1891	41	21	20	8	0

In the 1901 census of Ireland, there are seven families listed in the townland.

In the 1911 census of Ireland, there are ten families listed in the townland.

== Antiquities ==
The only known historic site in the townland was a prehistoric wedge tomb, but this was excavated in 1992 and moved to the grounds of The Slieve Russell Hotel in Cranaghan townland due to quarrying operations (Site number 7, page 2, Aughrim townland, in Archaeological Inventory of County Cavan, Patrick O’Donovan, 1995, where it is described as: 'Originally sited on Church Hill at the SE flank of Slieve Rushen (see CV010-005----), this tomb was excavated in 1992 in advance of quarrying operations and re-erected in the grounds of the Slieve Russell Hotel near Ballyconnell. It consists of a ruined gallery, some 6m long, aligned WSW-ENE, set in a low, round cairn, retained by a kerb. A tall stone at W, splits the entry to the gallery which seems to have been divided into a short portico and main chamber. There are buttress stones along both sides of the gallery. During the excavation both inhumed and cremated bone, in association with beaker and food-vessel pottery, were recovered from below the cairn and inside the gallery under a rough paving. Three cist burials were found at the inner edge of the kerb. (de Valera and Ó Nualláin 1972, 115-6, No. 14; Channing 1993, 4; O'Donovan 1995, 2, no. 7)'). It was one of only two megalithic structures in Tomregan parish; the only one now remaining in situ is the court-cairn in Doon townland.
