= Derrintony =

Townland in County Fermanagh, Northern Ireland

Coordinates: 54°09′27″N 7°33′00″W

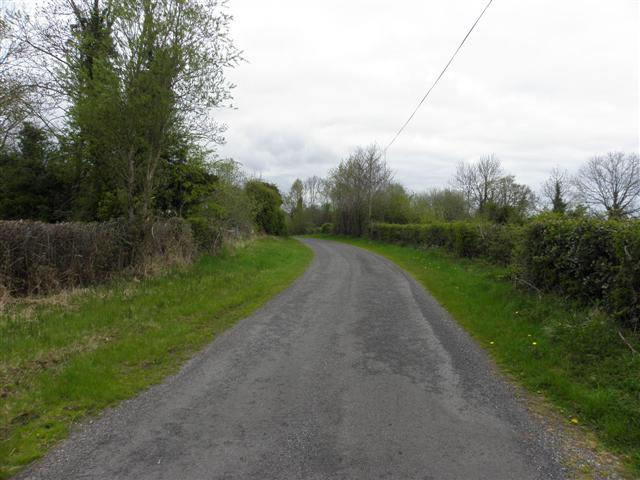
Road at Derrintony townland, Tomregan, County Fermanagh, Northern Ireland, heading northwards.

Derrintony is a townland in the Civil Parish of Tomregan, Barony of Knockninny, County Fermanagh, Northern Ireland.

== Etymology ==
The townland name is an anglicisation of the Gaelic placename Doire an Tonnaigh, which means 'The Oakwood of the Rampart'. The oldest surviving mention of the name is in a grant dated 15 October 1610 where it is spelt Derrenteine. Spellings in later grants are Derrintory (1612) and Derrenteine (1629). Ambrose Leet's 1814 Directory spells the name as Derrintunny.

== Geography ==
It is bounded on the north by Drumshimuck townland, on the east by Drumany More and Derryart townlands, on the south by Garvary townland and on the west by Aghindisert, Gortaree and Aghintra townlands. Its chief geographical features are the Duvoge River and a drumlin hill reaching 70 metres above sea level. The townland is traversed by Derrintony Lane. Derrintony covers an area of 148 statute acres.

== History ==
The townland formed part of the ballybethagh of Calvagh in medieval times. As it was a border townland the ownership was contested between the McGovern and Maguire clans. At the time of the 1609 Ulster Plantation the townland was overlooked and does not appear on the Plantation Baronial maps. The map for Knockninny barony stops on the east bank of the stream entering the Woodford river between the townlands of Derryhooly and Corry townlands, while the Tullyhaw barony map stops where the Irish border is now, thus omitting that part of Tomregan parish which lies in County Fermanagh. The mapping of Fermanagh and Cavan only took about 10 days each, which was insufficient time to make a proper survey. A different surveyor was sent into each barony to draw up his own map so the error probably arose because the surveyor who drew the Knockninny map assumed the omitted townlands were in County Cavan and the Tullyhaw surveyor, who was probably a different man, then assumed the lands were in County Fermanagh. The confusion continued for a few years. Firstly a grant was made to Thomas Monepeny on 15 October 1610 of the Manor of Aghalane, which included one tate of Derrenteine. By 1611 Monepeny had not appeared to take up possession, according to Carew, the King's commissioner. Taking advantage of this, Lady Margaret O’Neill, the widow of Hugh Maguire (Lord of Fermanagh) claimed the land. An order of the Lord Deputy dated 14 October 1612 states- Wheras The Lady Margrett ny Neale, wyddowe, late wyfe to Sir Hugh Maguyre knight deceased, hath discovered the parcells of land beinge eight tates, and doe lye betweene Knockneny in the County of Fermanagh and Tollagh in the County of Cavan and not within anie Undertakers portion who have since enjoyed the same as it hath been certified by the Surveyors ... we enact that the said Lady Margrett shall receive the next Hallowtyde rent due out of the said eight tates and thence forth until his Majesty decides otherwise. The eight tates included one tate of Derrintory, Garwarry and Dromdeye. Lady Margaret then seems to have left the scene because, on 31 July 1613, Thomas Monepeny sold the Manor of Aghalane to Thomas Creighton. Thomas Creighton then died in 1618, and his widow Katherine married George Adwick. The estate descended to Thomas Creighton's son, David Creighton. He was a minor at his father's death so his mother and George Adwick administered the estate on his behalf. An Inquisition held at Castlecoote on 5 November 1629 stated that David Creighton owned, inter alia, the lands of Derrenteine.

In the 18th century no residents were entitled to vote in the townland. (The voters listed from Derrintony in the electoral rolls all resided in the townland of Derrintony in Aghalurcher parish).

The Tithe Applotment Books for 1827 (which spell it as Derrintunny) list the following tithepayers in the townland: Fawcett, Curry, McAvinue.

The Derrintony Valuation Office Field books are available for May 1836.

Griffith's Valuation of 1857 lists fifteen occupiers in the townland. The landlord of Derrrintony in the 1850s was Robert Collins.

== Census ==
Year	Population	Males	Females	Total houses	Uninhabited
1841	36	15	21	5	0
1851	26	10	16	4	0
1861	43	23	20	9	0
1871	30	15	15	5	0
1881	25	11	14	5	0
1891	16	7	9	5	0

In the 1901 census of Ireland, there are five families listed in the townland.

In the 1911 census of Ireland, there are five families listed in the townland.

== Antiquities ==
The only historic site in the townland is an old foot-stick over the Duvoge River.
