= Derryart =

Townland in County Fermanagh, Northern Ireland

Derryart is a townland in the civil parish of Tomregan, barony of Knockninny, County Fermanagh, Northern Ireland.

== Etymology ==
The townland name is an anglicisation of the Gaellge placename "Doire Airt" which means 'Art's Oakwood'. The earliest reference is in a grant dated 15 October 1610 which spells it as Derarke. Other spellings in documents are- 1629 Derarke; 1630 Derearte and 1827 Derralt.

== Geography ==
It is bounded on the north by Drumany More townland, on the east by Derrychorran and Derrylaney townlands, on the south by Garvary townland and on the west by Derrintony townland. Its chief geographical features are the Duvoge River and a drumlin hill reaching to 60 metres above sea-level. The townland is traversed by Derryart Lane. Derryart covers an area of 114 statute acres.

== History ==
The townland formed part of the ballybethagh of Calvagh in medieval times. As it was a border townland the ownership was contested between the McGovern and Maguire clans. At the time of the 1609 Ulster Plantation the townland was overlooked and does not appear on the Plantation Baronial maps. The map for Knockninny barony stops on the east bank of the stream entering the Woodford river between the townlands of Derryhooly and Corry townlands, while the Tullyhaw barony map stops where the Irish border is now, thus omitting that part of Tomregan parish which lies in County Fermanagh. The mapping of Fermanagh and Cavan only took about 10 days each, which was insufficient time to make a proper survey. A different surveyor was sent into each barony to draw up his own map so the error probably arose because the surveyor who drew the Knockninny map assumed the omitted townlands were in County Cavan and the Tullyhaw surveyor who was probably a different man then assumed the lands were in County Fermanagh. A grant was made to Thomas Monepeny on 15 October 1610 of the Manor of Aghalane, which included one tate of Derarke. By 1611 Monepeny had not appeared to take up possession, according to Carew, the King's commissioner. On 31 July 1613, Thomas Monepeny sold the Manor of Aghalane to Thomas Creighton. Thomas Creighton then died in 1618, and his widow Katherine married George Adwick. The estate descended to Thomas Creighton's son, David Creighton. He was a minor at his father's death so his mother and George Adwick administered the estate on his behalf. An Inquisition held at Castlecoote on 5 November 1629 stated that David Creighton owned, inter alia, 1 tate of Derarke. However, there seems to have been some dispute with Sir Stephen Butler, who owned the adjoining manor, as an Inquisition held at Netownbutler on 20 January 1630 stated that Sir Stephen Butler owned, inter alia, 1 tate of Derearte.

In July 1751 no residents were entitled to vote in the townland.

The Tithe Applotment Books for 1827 (which spells it as Derralt) list the following tithepayers in the townland- Shearson, Chambers, Graves.

The Derryart Valuation Office Field books are available for May 1836.

Griffith's Valuation of 1857 lists seven occupiers in the townland. The landlord of Derryart in the 1850s was Robert Collins.

A book about the Sherson family of Derryart is called The Shersons of Derryart: The Descendants of Abraham & Thomas Sherson.

== Census ==
Year	Population	Males	Females	Total Houses	Uninhabited
1841	38	17	21	5	0
1851	27	12	15	5	0
1861	22	10	12	5	0
1871	30	17	13	6	0
1881	30	15	15	5	0
1891	26	12	14	5	0

In the 1901 census of Ireland, there are seven families listed in the townland.

In the 1911 census of Ireland, there are seven families listed in the townland.

== Antiquities ==
There are no historic sites in the townland.
