= The Troubles in Derrylin =

Incidents in Derrylin, Northern Ireland during the Troubles

The Troubles in Derrylin recounts violent incidents during The Troubles in Derrylin, County Fermanagh, Northern Ireland.

== 1972 ==
- 21 September - Thomas Bullock (53), a part-time member of the Ulster Defence Regiment (UDR), and his wife, Emily (50), were shot and killed by the Irish Republican Army (IRA) in their home at Killynick, near Derrylin.
- 16 December - Louis Leonard (26), a member of the IRA, was shot and killed by gunmen from an unidentified Loyalist group at his butcher's shop in Derrylin.

== 1973 ==
- 17 October - a postmaster was wounded when armed men from an unknown faction raided the Derrylin post office.

== 1974 ==
- 10 April - George Saunderson (58), a former member of the UDR, was shot and killed by the IRA at his workplace, Derrylin Primary School.
- 21 April - James Murphy (40), a Sinn Féin member, was shot to death by the Ulster Volunteer Force (UVF) at his garage in nearby Corraveigh.
- 2 December - John Maddocks (32), a soldier in the British Army, was killed by a booby trap bomb planted by the IRA while on foot patrol in nearby Gortmullan.

== 1985 ==
- 1 February - James Graham (39), an off-duty member of the UDR, was shot and killed by the IRA while driving a school bus.

== 1988 ==
- 6 April - William Burleigh (51), an off-duty member of the UDR, was killed by a booby trap bomb attached to his car by the IRA at Tirraroe, near Derrylin.
