= Gortahurk =

Gortahurk may refer to:

- Gortahurk, Kilcronaghan civil parish, County Londonderry, Northern Ireland
- Gortahurk, Tomregan civil parish, County Fermanagh, Northern Ireland
