= Garvary =

Townland in County Fermanagh, Northern Ireland

Garvary is a townland in County Fermanagh, Northern Ireland. It is in the civil parish of Tomregan, barony of Knockninny. It is on the outskirts of Enniskillen.

== Etymology ==
The townland name is an anglicisation of the Gaelic placename Garbh Aire, which means 'rough land'. The oldest surviving mention of the name is in a grant dated 15 October 1610, where it is spelled 'Garvore'. Spellings in later grants are- 1612 Garwarry; 1629 Garvore and 1630 Garrywarrye.

== Geography ==
It is bounded on the north by Derrintony and Derryart townlands, on the east by Derrylaney and Derryhooly townlands, on the south by Kiltycrose townland and on the west by Aghindisert & Drumderg townlands. Its chief geographical features are Drumderg Lough, the Duvoge River, Moninea Bog and a drumlin hill reaching to 60 metres above sea-level. The townland is traversed by the C431 Teemore Road and some minor lanes. Garvary covers an area of 249 statute acres.

== History ==
The townland formed part of the ballybethagh of Calvagh in medieval times. As it was a border townland the ownership was contested between the McGovern and Maguire clans. At the time of the 1609 Ulster Plantation the townland was overlooked and does not appear on the Plantation Baronial maps. The map for Knockninny barony stops on the east bank of the stream entering the Woodford river between the townlands of Derryhooly and Corry townlands, while the Tullyhaw barony map stops where the Irish border is now, thus omitting that part of Tomregan parish which lies in County Fermanagh. The mapping of Fermanagh and Cavan only took about 10 days each, which was insufficient time to make a proper survey. A different surveyor was sent into each barony to draw up his own map so the error probably arose because the surveyor who drew the Knockninny map assumed the omitted townlands were in County Cavan and the Tullyhaw surveyor, who was probably a different man, then assumed the lands were in County Fermanagh. This confusion lasted a few years. Firstly a grant was made to Thomas Monepeny on 15 October 1610 of the Manor of Aghalane, which included one tate of Garvore. By 1611 Monepeny had not appeared to take up possession, according to Carew, the King's commissioner. Taking advantage of this, Lady Margaret O’Neill, the widow of Hugh Maguire (Lord of Fermanagh) claimed the land. An order of the Lord Deputy dated 14 October 1612 states- Wheras The Lady Margrett ny Neale, wyddowe, late wyfe to Sir Hugh Maguyre knight deceased, hath discovered the parcells of land beinge eight tates, and doe lye betweene Knockneny in the County of Fermanagh and Tollagh in the County of Cavan and not within anie Undertakers portion who have since enjoyed the same as it hath been certified by the Surveyors ... we enact that the said Lady Margrett shall receive the next Hallowtyde rent due out of the said eight tates and thence forth until his Majesty decides otherwise. The eight tates included one tate of Derrintory, Garwarry and Dromdeye. Lady Margaret then seems to have left the scene because, on 31 July 1613, Thomas Monepeny sold the Manor of Aghalane to Thomas Creighton. Thomas Creighton then died in 1618, and his widow Katherine married George Adwick. The estate descended to Thomas Creighton's son, David Creighton. He was a minor at his father's death so his mother and George Adwick administered the estate on his behalf. An Inquisition held at Castlecoote on 5 November 1629 stated that David Creighton owned, inter alia, 1 tate of Garvore. However, there seems to have been some dispute with Sir Stephen Butler, who owned the adjoining manor, as an Inquisition held at Newtownbutler on 20 January 1630 stated that Sir Stephen Butler owned, inter alia, the lands of Garrywarrye.

In July 1751 no residents were entitled to vote in the townland.

The Tithe Applotment Books for 1827 (which spell it as Gorwira) list the following tithepayers in the townland- McGuire, Drum, McKernan, Whittendale.

The Garvary Valuation Office Field books are available for May 1836.

Griffith's Valuation of 1857 lists twenty occupiers in the townland. The landlord of Garvary in the 1850s was Robert Collins.

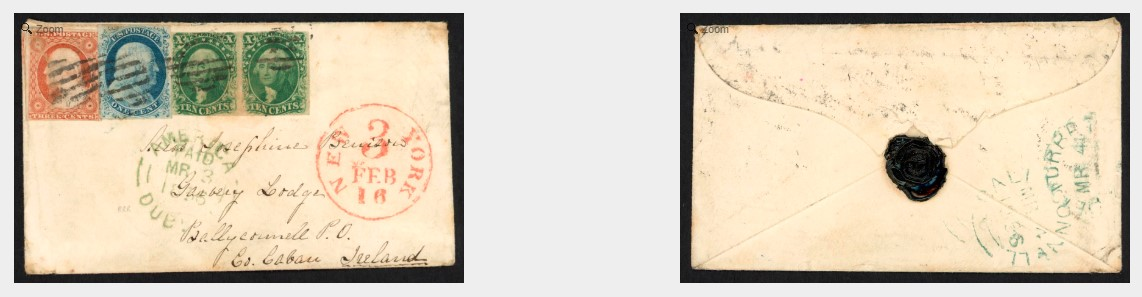
1856 letter New York to Garvary

== Census ==
Year	Population	Males	Females	Total Houses	Uninhabited
1841	86	42	44	20	0
1851	55	25	30	14	2
1861	61	30	31	13	1
1871	66	30	36	11	0
1881	49	23	26	11	0
1891	48	22	26	12	0

In the 1901 census of Ireland, there are fourteen families listed in the townland.

In the 1911 census of Ireland, there are eleven families listed in the townland.

== Antiquities ==
The historic sites in the townland are a medieval crannóg in Drumderg Lough and Garvary Lodge, the home of Robert Collins M.D., who was the landlord of most of the surrounding townlands in the 1850s
