= Doon, County Cavan =

Doon is the name of three townlands in County Cavan, Ireland, with one situated in the civil parishes of Drumreilly, Mullagh, and Tomregan. All three derive their name from the Irish term Dún, meaning "fort".

- Doon (Drumreilly), in the civil parish of Drumreilly, is in the electoral division of Benbrack. It is also situated in the former barony of Tullyhaw.
- Doon (Mullagh), in the civil parish of Mullagh, is in the electoral division of Crossbane. It is also situated in the former barony of Castlerahan.
- Doon (Tomregan), in the civil parish of Tomregan, is in the electoral division of Ballyconnell. It is also situated in the barony of Tullyhaw.
