= Garvary (disambiguation) =

Garvary (from the Irish placenameGarbh Aire meaning 'rough land') is the name of several places on the island of Ireland:

- Garvary (Corlough), a townland in County Cavan
- Garvary, the name of two townlands in County Donegal; see List of townlands of County Donegal
- Garvary, a townland in County Fermanagh
- Garvary, a townland in County Longford; see List of townlands of County Longford
