= Tomregan =

Civil parish in the Irish barony of Tullyhaw

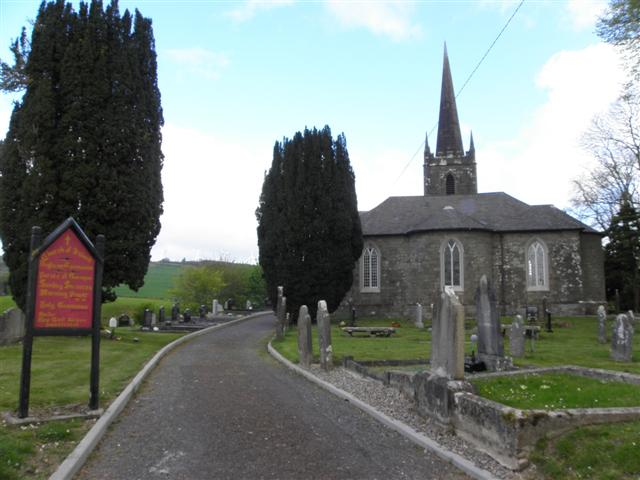
Tomregan Church of Ireland Church, Church Street, Ballyconnell, County Cavan.

Tomregan (Irish: Tuaim Dreagain, IPA: [ˌt̪ˠuəmʲ ˈdʲɾʲaɡənʲ]) is a civil parish in the ancient barony of Tullyhaw. The parish straddles the border between the Republic of Ireland and Northern Ireland. The largest population centre in the parish is Ballyconnell, County Cavan. The total area of the civil parish is 10,600 statute acres. Most of Tomregan's constituent townlands are situated in County Cavan while the remainder lie in County Fermanagh. In the Catholic Church, the ecclesiastical parish of Tomregan was split in the early 18th century, with the County Fermanagh townlands being assigned to the parish of Knockninny while the County Cavan townlands were united with the parish of Kildallan.

== The townlands ==
The County Fermanagh townlands in Tomregan civil parish are- Aghindisert, Carickaleese, Cloncoohy, Derrintony, Derryart, Garvary, Gortahurk, Gortaree, Gortineddan, Gortmullan, Knockadoois, Knockateggal, Tonymore and Ummera.

The County Cavan townlands in Tomregan civil parish are- Agharaskilly, Aghavoher, Annagh, Aughrim, Berrymount, Carrigan, Carrowmore, Cavanagh, Clifton, Cloncollow, Corranierna, Cranaghan, Cullyleenan, Derryginny, Doon, Fartrin, Gortawee or Scotchtown, Gortoorlan, Moher, Mucklagh, Mullaghduff, Mullanacre Lower, Mullanacre Upper, Mullynagolman, Rakeelan, Slievebrickan, Snugborough, Sralahan (also called "The Common").

== Etymology ==
The Dindshenchas states that the name Tuaim Drecain is derived from the grave of Regan Anglonnach, one of the Formorians -- Tell me the famous cause whence Tuaim Regain is named. Brefne, daughter of Beoan mac Bethaig, a brave soldier-woman, fell in conflict for that land with the Children of Ham, with their evil power. Regan of the Children of impious Ham, from the army of strong-smiting Balar, was a warrior of prowess and exploits, whom none could face in equal battle. Regan it was, dangerous beyond dispute, that engaged the combat; he was leader of the retinue of red-armed Oengus mac ind Oc, with all his army. The warrior went his way in good sooth, when he had slain the soldier-woman, to demand an unjust tribute from the hosts of the Gael, though an unrighteous claim. There met him, face to face, unaided, the king's son of the Gael; they fought a stern fight, hard by the rock of Asual's son. The spot where the Fomoir's head was struck off—it was a doughty deed—is called after him Tuaim Regain: I hide not from thee the cause of the name.

== Historical events ==
The main events in the history of Tomregan as listed in the ancient sources are-

1. The killing of Regan, the Fomorian, at Tomregan in 1860 BC.
2. The Battle of Tuaim Drecain in 1342 BC by the High King Eochaid Faebar Glas.
3. The murder of the Ulster hero Conall Cernach in the 1st century BC at Áth na Mianna (Ballyconnell).
4. The birth of St. Dallan Forgaill, the Chief Ollam of Ireland, in c.530 AD
5. The foundation of the University of Tuaim Drecain by the Synod of Drumceat in 584 AD.
6. The brain surgery in 636 on Cenn Fáelad mac Ailella
7. The Vision of Saint Bricín c. 640.
8. The Irish Rebellion of 1641 deposition concerning Knogher mc ffarrell oge o Rely of Tomragin.
