= Ballyconnell =

Town in County Cavan, Ireland

Ballyconnell Irish: Béal Átha Conaill
- Town
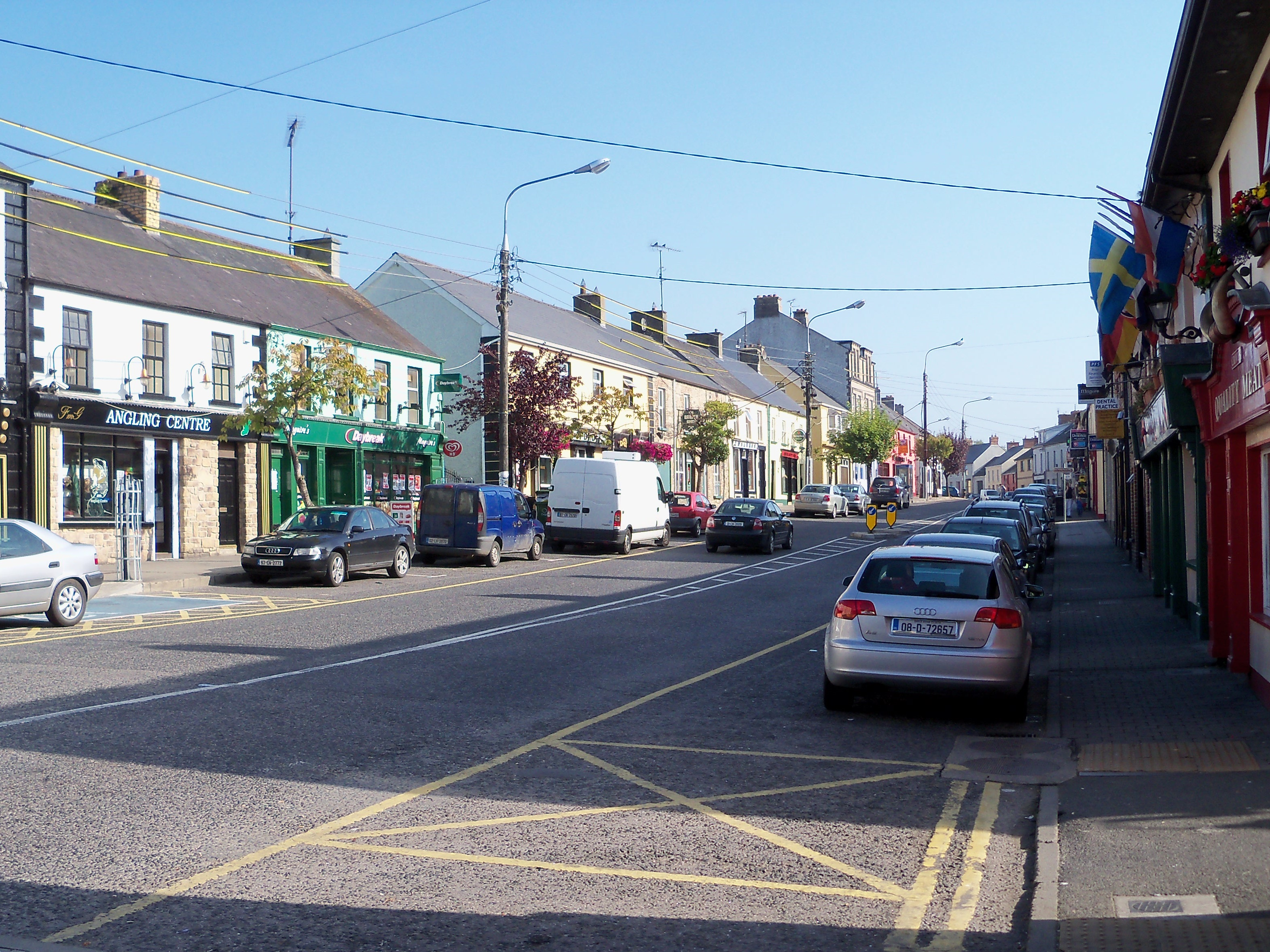
- Ballyconnell's main street

- Location in Ireland
- Coordinates: 54°07′00″N 7°35′00″W
- Country: Ireland
- Province: Ulster
- County: County Cavan
- Barony: Tullyhaw
- Elevation: 55 m (180 ft)

Population (2022)
  - Total: 1,422
- Time zone: UTC+0 (WET)
  - Summer (DST): UTC-1 (IST (WEST))
- Irish Grid Reference: H361168

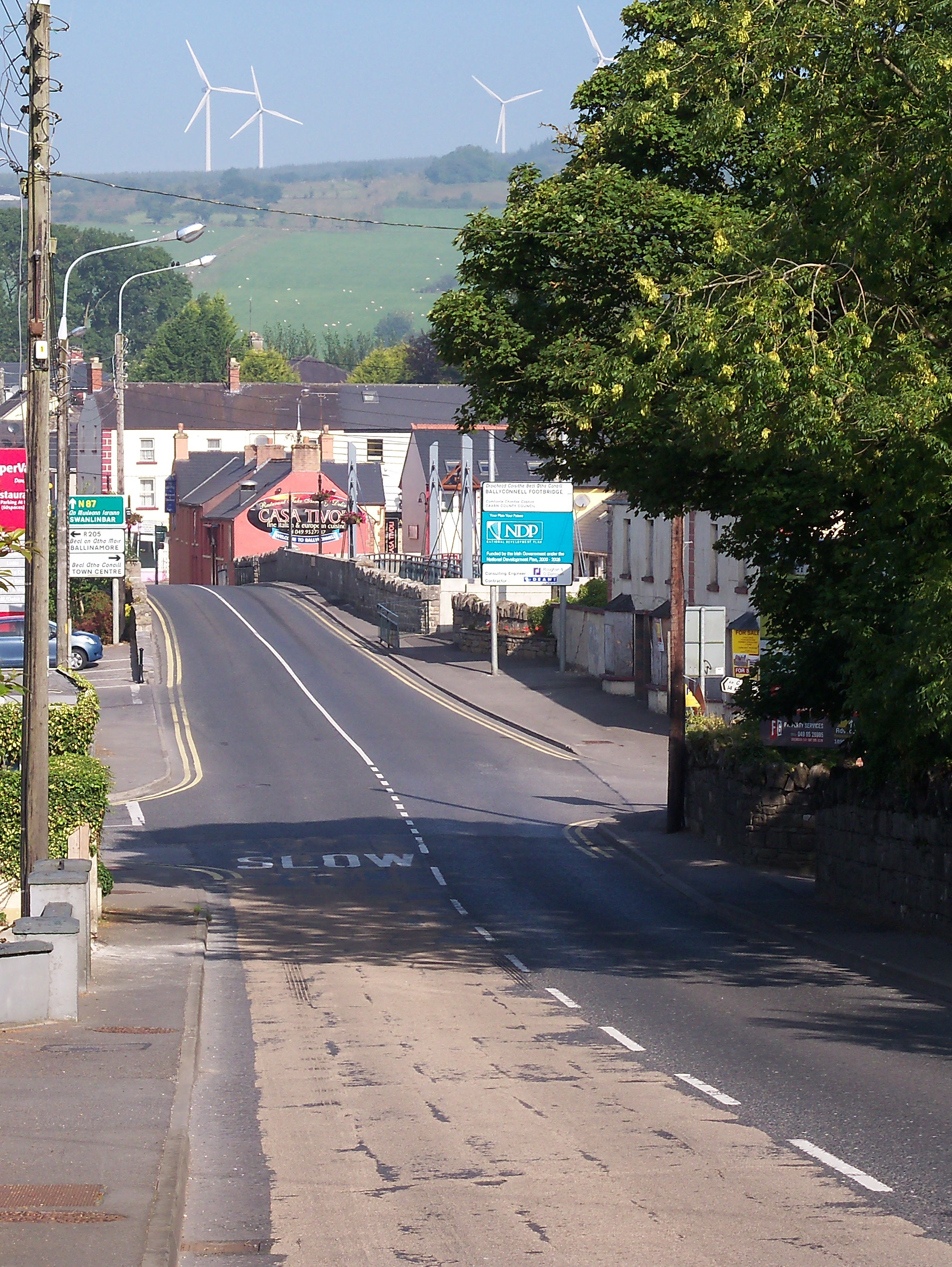
Ballyconnell

Ballyconnell (Irish: Béal Átha Conaill, meaning 'entrance to the ford of Conall') is a market town in County Cavan, Ireland. It is on the N87 road at the junction of four townlands: Annagh, Cullyleenan, Doon (Tomregan) and Derryginny, and is in the civil parish of Tomregan, in the historical barony of Tullyhaw.

Ballyconnell won the Irish Tidy Towns Competition in 1971 and 1975. According to the 2022 census, the population of the town was 1,422.

== Name ==
The earliest surviving mention of the name Ballyconnell is an entry in the Annals of the Four Masters for the year 1323 A.D., which states "Rory Mac Mahon, son of the Lord of Oriel, Melaghlin O'Seagannain, and Mac Muldoon, were slain by Cathal O'Rourke at Bel-atha-Chonaill". Before being named Ballyconnell, it was named Maigen which means 'the little plain' with the local ford called Áth na Mianna which means 'ford of the miners'. It was also named Gwyllymsbrook between 1660 and 1702 by its then owner, Thomas Gwyllym.

Ballyconnell is an anglicisation of Béal Átha Conaill which means 'entrance to Conall's ford'. The ford was a shallow crossing over the River Gráinne ( Grainne was the wife of the Fianna warrior-god Fionn MacCumhaill) now called the Woodford River part of the Shannon–Erne Waterway canal, which once was the ancient border crossing for travellers going between Ulster and Connacht. The ford was caused by silt and gravel washed down from the nearby Slieve Rushen mountain by the Tanyard Stream, which flows into the Woodford River about 20 yards upstream from Ballyconnell Bridge on the western outskirts of the town.

Conall Cernach was the legendary hero of the Ulaid in the Ulster Cycle of Irish mythology, probably the second greatest warrior after Cuchulainn. In his old age, according to legend, Connall left Ulster and stayed at Croaghan with the Connacht royal couple Ailill and Medb. He killed Ailill at Medb's behest and was pursued and slain near the fording point of the River Gráinne (Woodford River) by the three Ruadhcoin sent by the people of Connacht to avenge the slaying of Conall.

== History ==
=== Prehistoric ===
The area was settled as early as c. 3000 BC as evidenced by a double-court tomb in the town and a ring barrow in the same field.

The area, at a fording point of the nearby Woodford River, was thickly wooded and had no roadways. The easiest way to travel would have been by boat via the river and the lakes and streams in the area. The only other known megalith in the parish is a wedge tomb dating from 2000 B.C. on the side of Slieve Rushen mountain in Aughrim townland. However, the megalithic wedge tomb was dug up in 1992 to facilitate stone and sand quarrying to take place by the Quinn Group from the mountain and was relocated to the grounds of the Slieve Russell Hotel, to serve as a tourist attraction.

Ballyconnell historically lay on the eastern part of Magh Slécht named Maigin ("the little plain"), so called because it was a narrow strip bounded on the north by Slieve Rushen mountain and on the south by the River Graine. Maigin was the birthplace, in the 6th century, of Saint Dallán Forgaill.

=== Medieval ===
A small market town on the River Woodford beneath Slieve Rushen, close by the ancient border between Breifni and Fermanagh. Ballyconnell first emerges in the medieval period as a centre of the territory of the Magauran clan, whose chiefs had a ring fort and a burial place there. Ballyconnell was situated in one of the ballybetoes of Tullyhaw named Calmhagh (Calva), which basically means almost the same as Maigin, the narrow plain. The province border regions between Ulster and Connacht was throughout ancient history a flash-point for tribal clan wars between the Ulster Maguires, O'Rourkes, O'Reillys, McGaurans, McKiernans of Connacht and their allies. From the ninth century the Kingdom of Breifni included all modern day Cavan, Leitrim and parts of Fermanagh, Longford, Meath and Sligo. was ruled over by the O'Rourkes. The Annals of Ireland record significaant incidents at the Battle of Magh Slecht plains near Ballyconnell. These include, in 1256 the break up of O'Rourke's rule in a conflict with O'Reilly clans for control of the kingdom. The result left the Breifni kingdom permanently divided, creating West Breifni (O'Rourke) and East Breifni (O'Reilly). Later in 1323 a note that Rory MacMahon, Mel O'Seagannain & MacMuldoon were slain at Ballyconnell by Cathal O'Rourke. According to the annals, in 1457, Brian Maguire fought with Lochlann O'Rourke, the McGaurans & McKiernans at Ballyconnell. In 1470, O'Donnell and O'Rourke fought with O'Reilly, the English and the McKiernans at Ballyconnell. And, in 1475, Hugh Roe O'Donnell went to Ballyconnell to make peace with the O'Reilly. The annals suggest that O'Donnell camped at Ballyconnell after raiding the town of Cavan in 1595.

=== Post-1600 ===
In 1606 Cormac Magauran sold the surrounding lands comprising the manor of Calva. Captain Richard Tyrrell, of Tyrrellspass Castle, County Westmeath, bought the Derryginny and Snugborough parts of the Calva ballybetagh from Cormac Magauran. He then exchanged his lands at the start of the Ulster Plantation for more property in Tullygarvey barony where he lived.

Walter Talbot, a recusant servitor and a burgess of Cavan Corporation, whose parents were James Talbot and Margaret Brett of Agherskeethe (now Augherskea), County Meath, purchased another part of the Calva ballybetagh before 1609 but the title was defective. However, in the launching of the Plantation of Ulster in 1609, Sir Arthur Chichester, the Lord Deputy of Ireland, allowed Talbot to keep his estate as he had begun bringing in settlers and building houses. In the Plantation of Ulster by grant dated 23 June 1610, King James VI and I granted the lands forming the 'Manor of Calva' to English servitor Captain Hugh Culme. Captain Hugh Culme was constable of Cloughoughter castle of which with its lands he received a twenty one year lease in November 1610 later to become provost marshal for Cavan and Monaghan. Hugh Culme the original patentee in the barony of Tullyhaw entered a partnership agreement with Walter Talbot in Balllyconnell, whereupon when Hugh Culme died in 1630 it became owned entirely by Talbot's son James. It was officially regranted by 1638 to James Talbot as the 'Manor of Calva'. The lands granted were the town of Ballyconnell and a number of surrounding townlands.

It was Walter Talbot, described as Old English, together with Hugh Culme who promoted the Plantation settlement here, raising a strong castle and bawn at Annagh on the east side of the river built of stone and lime, it was over three storeys tall with two flankers, described in 1622 : 'located in a very good place and convenient for the strength and defence of that part of the country'. Other notable buildings in the Pynnar survey were recent built wooden houses. The ruined Catholic church at the top of Church Street (Site number 1815, Doon townland, Archaeological Inventory of County Cavan, Patrick O’Donovan, 1995, p. 230) and an old McGovern fort. The rest of the buildings were mud huts belonging to the Irish natives. In September 1611, a survey by Lord Carew (later created 1st Earl of Totnes) found that Talbot had built a strong timber house and two other wattled houses (Site number 1798, Annagh townland, Archaeological Inventory of County Cavan, Patrick O’Donovan, 1995, p. 228). He had also felled 40 trees but did no other work. By 1613, Talbot had progressed with building work. Sir Josias Bodley reported on 6 February 1613 that:

"Proportion No. 29: 1,500 acres. On the proportion undertaken by Capt. Culme and Walter Talbot, there are 3 or 4 handsome Irish houses by them built, and some provision made towards the building of a castle in a most convenient place for occasions of service, being near a special ford or passage, by which in times past that county was much infested. The quarry of limestone and building stone is on the place, good store of lime already burnt, and of building stone digged, much timber and planks drawn thither already, and the rest provided in a wood not above a mile off, so that this next summer the whole work, I suppose both of castle and bawn will be perfected".

There was no bridge at Ballyconnell in 1613, but it appears on the 1656 Down Survey map so the first bridge must have been built between 1613 & 1656. The present bridge was erected in the 1830s. In 1617 Connor and Terence O'Sheridan were granted a licence to make and sell spirituous liquors in Balliconnell and throughout Tullagha barony.

By 1619, Pynnar's Survey of Land Holders found that Talbot had built a strong defensive wall called a bawn, which was a square measuring 100 feet (30 m) along each side and 12 ft high, with two flanking towers. Within the bawn was erected a strong castle of lime and stone three stories high which was described as being "in a very good and convenient place for the strength and service of the country".

In August 1622, another survey stated that:

"Walter Talbot has 1,500 acres called Ballyconnell, upon which there is builded a strong castle of stone and lyme, with two flanckers at each cross corner. This castle and ye flanckers are three stories and a half high and standeth in a very good place and convenient for the strength and defence of that parte of the country which is an obscure and bordering corner of the countie. Mr Walter Talbott, his wife and familie are now dwelling there. There are severall Palemen estates, some in fee farm, some for lives and some for yeares, upon part of the land. The rest are leased to natives of the country. The said Walter Talbott and all his tenants are recusants. Armes in the castle are 11 pikes, 3 callivers, 5 head peeces, 3 targetts and 1 halbert". The castle was destroyed in a fire in 1688 and Ballyconnell House was erected on its site in Annagh townland.

Some of these ruins are still visible and a section of the bawn wall was uncovered in an archaeological excavation.

Walter Talbot died at Ballyconnell on 26 June 1625, his son James Talbot succeeded to the Ballyconnell estate aged just 10 years. James Talbot married Helen Calvert (born 1615), the daughter of George Calvert, 1st Baron Baltimore, in 1635 and had a son, Colonel George Talbot. He owned an estate in Cecil County, Maryland, which he named Ballyconnell in honour of his native town in County Cavan. George Talbot was appointed Surveyor-General of Maryland in 1683. In the aftermath of the Irish Rebellion of 1641, James Talbot's estate in Ballyconnell was confiscated because he was a Catholic and instead he was granted an estate in 1655 at Castleruby townland, Baslick parish, County Roscommon. He died in 1687. The Anglican Bishop of Kilmore William Bedell granted a sum of money £40 Sterling for the re-edifying of the Plantation Tomregan (Ballyconnell) church prior to May 1634.

By 1652, the Irish rebels in the Ballyconnell area had been defeated and the area was put under the control of the Cromwellian captain Thomas Gwyllym. He was a native of Glenavy, County Antrim, where his father, the Rev. Meredith Gwyllym, was vicar of the parishes of Glenavy, Camlin, Tullyrusk, Ballinderry & Magheragall in County Antrim and Baronstown & Kene in County Louth from 1622 until sometime after 1634. Gwyllym's name first appears in the area as the owner of the Ballyconnell Estate in the 1652 Commonwealth Survey and as a commissioner (as "Thomas Guilliams") for the 1654 Assessment of Tax. He also appears as a Cavan Commissioner in the 1660 Hearth Money Ordinances. In the Hearth Money Rolls compiled on 29 September 1663 Thomas Gwyllym has five hearths in 'Bellaconell'. The other Hearth Tax payers were "John Squire, Henry Jordan and Denis Alarne", all of whom had one hearth. After the restoration of King Charles II to the throne in 1660, James Talbot tried to have the Ballyconnell Estate restored to him but a final grant was made to Thomas Gwyllym in August 1666 and the town was renamed Gwyllymsbrook in his honour. Thomas Gwyllym died in 1681 and his son, Colonel Meredith Gwyllym, inherited the Ballyconnell Estate. In 1683, he married Margery Sheridan, the sister of Sir Thomas Sheridan, Secretary of State for Ireland, and they had one child who died unmarried in 1728. In 1687, they built an extension to Ballyconnell Castle at a cost of £500 but when King James II came to the throne of England in 1685, the Catholics began to take power and in 1688 they occupied Ballyconnell Castle and burned it to the ground, causing the Gwyllyms to go and live in Cloverhill (also known as Drumcassidy), County Cavan, until the war was over.

The Gwyllym estate was sold for £8,000 in 1724 to Colonel Alexander Montgomery (1686–1729) of Convoy House in Convoy, East Donegal, M.P. for Donegal Borough, 1725 to 1727, and for Donegal County, 1727 to 1729. He died in 1729 and left the Ballyconnell estate to his nephew George Leslie who then assumed the name George Leslie Montgomery. George Leslie Montgomery was M.P. for Strabane, County Tyrone, from 1765 to 1768 and for County Cavan from 1770 to 1787, when he died and left the Ballyconnell estate to his son George Montgomery (b. 1754), whose estate was administered by the Court of Chancery as he was a lunatic. George Montgomery died on 20 March 1841 and his estate went to his Enery cousins of Bawnboy. The Montgomery Estate Papers for Ballyconnell are in the National Library of Ireland. In 1856 the Enerys sold the estate to take advantage of its increased value owing to the opening of the Woodford Canal through the town in the same year. The estate was split up amongst different purchasers including George Roe (who bought Ballyconnell House, a few houses in the village and a few townlands including Annagh, Corranierna and part of Rakeelan) and The 4th Earl Annesley (who purchased the townlands of Carrowmore, Gortoorlan, Moher, Mullanacre and Snugborough).

In the Cavan Poll Book of 1761, there were twenty people registered to vote in Ballyconnell in the Irish general election, 1761. Each person was entitled to cast two votes. The four election candidates were Charles Coote, 1st Earl of Bellomont and Lord Newtownbutler (later Brinsley Butler, 2nd Earl of Lanesborough), both of whom were then elected Member of Parliament for Cavan County. The losing candidates were George Montgomery (MP) of Ballyconnell and Barry Maxwell, 1st Earl of Farnham. Absence from the poll book either meant a resident did not vote or, more likely, was not a freeholder entitled to vote, which would mean most of the inhabitants of Ballyconnell.

Another well-known family in the town were the Benisons of Mount Pleasant and Slieve Russell who owned a flax mill in Ballyconnell. Miss Josephine Benison, a daughter of James Benison, married (9 January 1890) Tom Arnold who was brother of the famous English poet Matthew Arnold; son of Dr. Thomas Arnold, the headmaster of Rugby Public School who appears as head master in the book Tom Brown's Schooldays and grandfather of Aldous Huxley. An account of this and Josephine's photo (Page 118, probably the earliest known photo of a Ballyconnell resident) can be seen online. Josephine's headstone in St.Brigid's R.C. graveyard in Ballyconnell reads- In loving memory of Josephine M. Arnold widow of Thomas Arnold M.A. F.R.I., died 16 January 1919, aged 87 years. Correspondence from the Benisons to Lord Belmore about the weather and farming in Ballyconnell and Fermanagh around 1900 is viewable on the PRONI website.

An 1835 statistical report on Ballyconnell and Tomregan by Lieutenant Greatorex on behalf of the Ordnance Survey is in the PRONI.

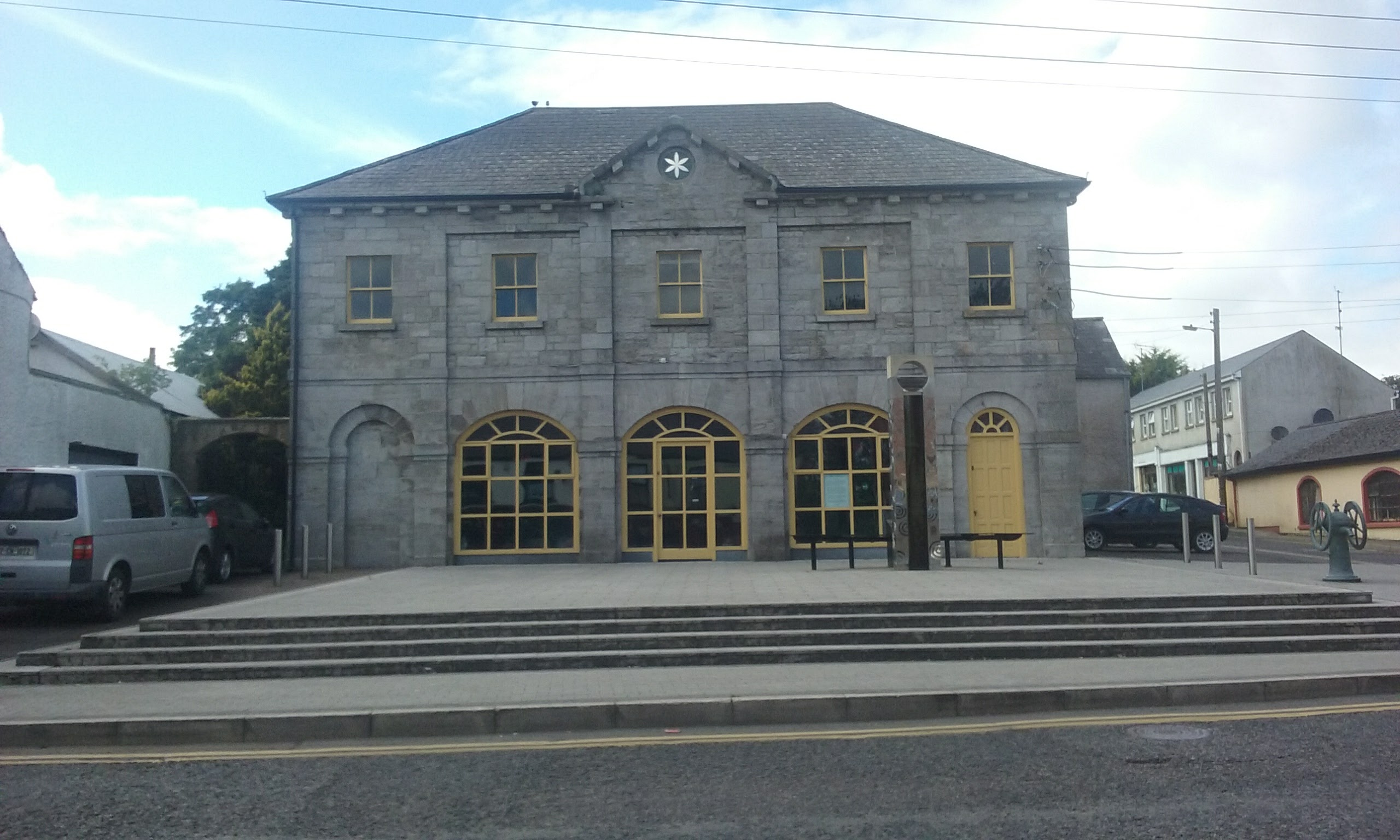
Ballyconnell Market House (built c. 1838)

The Market House was built on Ballyconnell's main street c. 1838, an ashlar limestone detached five-bay, two-story building attributed to architect William Deane Butler.

Griffith's Valuation of 1857 lists about 90 landlords and tenants for Doon and Ballyconnell. Further information and a detailed map showing the location of each holding can be seen online.

After the Partition of Ireland in 1920–22, Ballyconnell found itself cut off from its hinterland with County Fermanagh, which was now behind the new border with Northern Ireland. The town also during the Irish Civil War of 1922-23 when it was raided repeatedly by both sides. After an incident in which two civilians were shot dead in Ballyconnell by the anti-Treaty IRA in February 1923, a large Irish Free State column was sent to the area to suppress the republican guerrillas operating in the nearby Arigna Mountains, leading to further loss of life and disruption until the ceasefire of May 1923.

== Geography and climate ==
The town lies astride the Woodford River (Irish: Sruth Gráinne, meaning 'the Gravelly Stream' or 'the Gravelly River'), part of the Shannon–Erne Waterway, a boating route that was re-opened in 1993. The Woodford River is also known in English as the River Gráinne or the Graine River. Part of the Woodford River at Ballyconnell has been canalised; this small section is known as the Woodford Canal.

Ballyconnell sits at the foot of Slieve Rushen mountain and is a mile from the border between County Fermanagh in Northern Ireland and County Cavan in the Republic of Ireland. The town has an altitude of 55 metres above sea level.

The mean daily January temperature is 4.5 degrees Celsius and the mean daily July temperature is 15 degrees Celsius. The average annual rainfall is 1,000 mm. The average annual hours of sunshine are 1,250.

== Transport ==
=== Rail transport ===
Ballyconnell railway station opened on 24 October 1887, but finally closed on 1 April 1959. It was part of the narrow gauge Cavan and Leitrim Railway.

=== Bus transport ===
Leydon's Coaches operate route 930 linking Ballyconnell to Belturbet, Cavan, Bawnboy and Swanlinbar. Enniskillen is also served on Saturdays.

Bus Éireann local route 465 serves the town on Tuesdays only providing a link to Cavan, Arvagh, Ballinagh, Killeshandra and Carrigallen.

== Economy ==
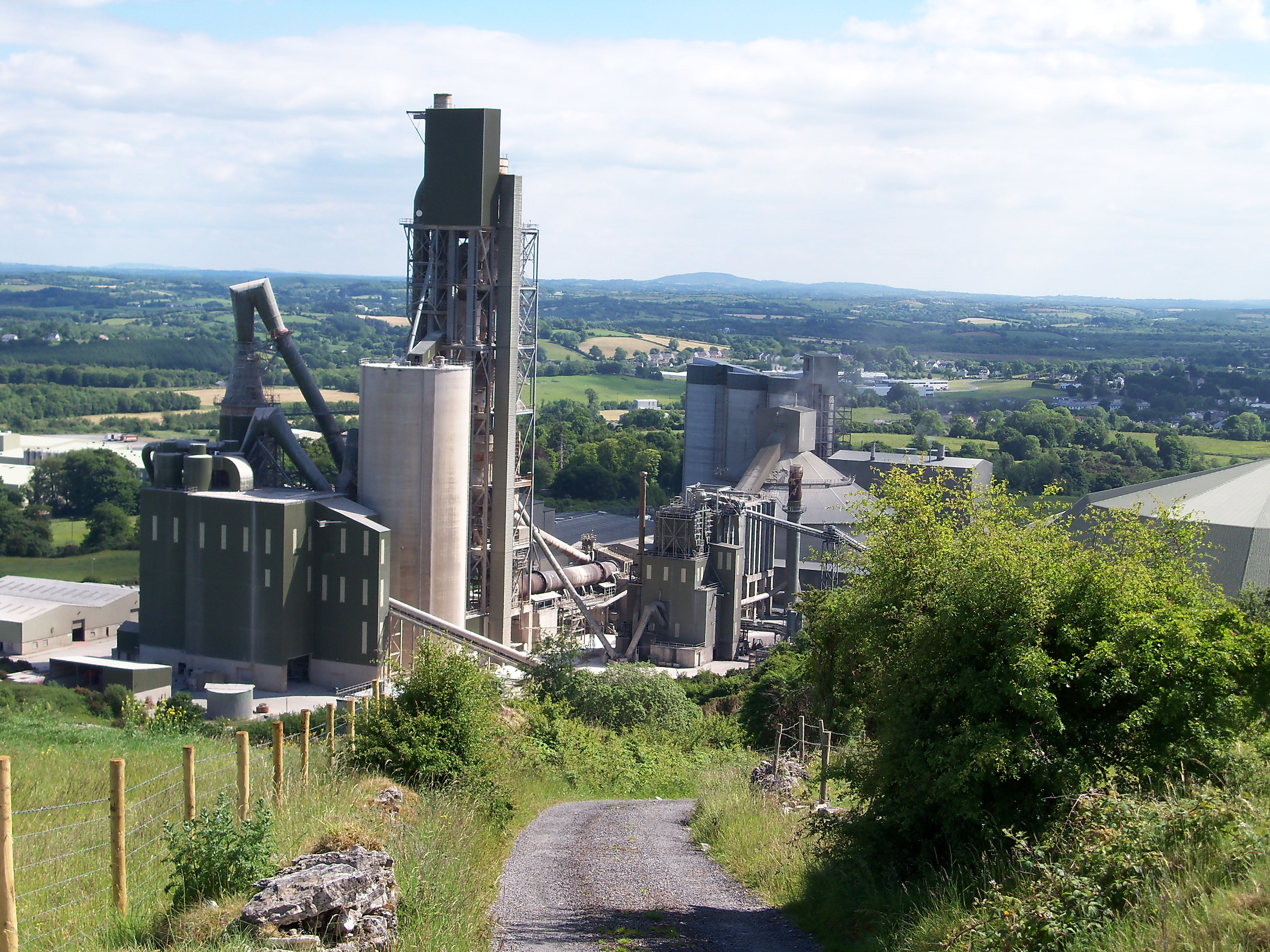
Cement factory

While traditional industry in the area is mainly agricultural, significant industrial development has taken place around Ballyconnell over recent decades. These developments mostly associated with the former Quinn Industries quarry works and the building of a large cement factory and glass works (now Manook Industries). Other local companies include a plastics factory and an animal feeds plant. This in turn has led to significant population growth and a housing boom about the town. Tourism is an important part of the local economy, with canal cruisers as a convenient stopping place when navigating the Shannon-Erne Waterway. Ballyconnell is an important 'gateway town' for the cross border UNESCO Cuilcagh Global Geopark. The town has a proud record in the National Tidy Towns Competition, winning the overall award in 1971 & 1975, together with many County winner awards through the years. In the 18th century lead, silver, coal, limestone, granite, marble, gravel, sand and iron were all mined from Slieve Rushen mountain.

== Sport ==
The first GAA club in Ulster was founded in Ballyconnell in 1885 and named 'Ballyconnell Joe Biggars' in honour of the then MP for West Cavan, Joseph Biggar, but later changed its name to "Ballyconnell First Ulsters". Their original strip consisted of horizontal stripes coloured black, red and yellow.

== Census ==
Year	Population	Males	Females	Total Houses	Uninhabited
1821	353	-	-	-	-
1831	453	222	231	79	7
1841	387	193	194	75	12
1851	503	252	251	85	6
1861	374	182	192	85	13
1871	429	197	232	84	4
1881	420	206	214	92	8
1891	291	142	149	76	9
1901	The 1901 census recorded 134 families in Ballyconnell				
1911	The 1911 census recorded 159 families in Ballyconnell				
1926	314	154	160	-	-
1936	276	126	150	-	-
1946	297	127	170	-	-
1951	282	138	144	-	-
1956	543	285	258	-	-
1961	542	290	252	-	-
1966	523	274	249	-	-
1971	421	207	214	-	-
1981	492	245	247	-	-
1986	466	229	237	-	-
1991	465	227	238	-	-
1996	433	218	215	-	-
2002	572	280	292	-	-
2006	747	389	358	-	-
2011	1,061	538	523	-	-
2016	1,105	542	563	-	-
2022	1,422	689	733	-	-

== Notable people ==
- Mary Freehill, former Lord Mayor of Dublin
- James Dillon, Roman Catholic Bishop of Kilmore from 1800 to 1806
- Leona Maguire, professional golfer
- Lisa Maguire, former professional golfer

== See also ==
- Market Houses in Ireland
