= Slieve Rushen =

Mountain in Ireland

Coordinates: 54°9′6.93″N 7°38′33.51″W

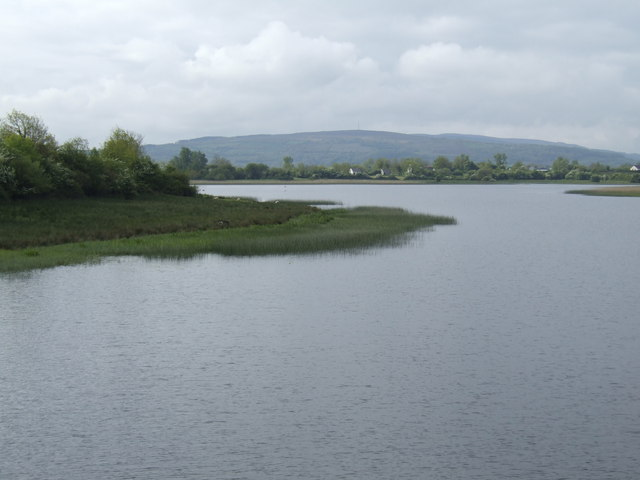
- Slieve Rushen from Upper Lough Erne

Highest point
- Elevation: 404 m (1,325 ft)
- Prominence: 404 m (1,325 ft)
- Listing: Marilyn

Naming
- Native name: Sliabh Roisean

Geography
- Location within Northern Ireland
- Location: County Cavan, Republic of Ireland and County Fermanagh, Northern Ireland

Slieve Rushen is a mountain which straddles the border between County Cavan in the Republic of Ireland and County Fermanagh in Northern Ireland. It is also called Slieve Russell or Ligavegra (also Legavagra, Ligavagra). It has an elevation of 404 metres above sea level. OS 1/50k Mapsheet: 27A & 26. Grid Ref: H234 226. The mountain is made up of grey limestone with a cap of sandstone and shales and is extensively quarried by local companies. The surface is mostly covered with peat, conifer forests and grazing fields. The mountain contains several caves and swallow-holes including Pollnagollum (Slieve Rushen) and Tory Hole which are a popular destination for potholers, both situate in Legavreagra townland. It forms part of the Slieve Rushen Bog Natural Heritage Area . A recent addition to the mountain is the Slieve Rushen Wind Farm for generating electricity.

== Etymology ==
The name Slieve Rushen derives from the Irish Sliabh Ros-in, 'mountain of the little wood'. However an alternative explanation of the name is given in a Middle Irish text c.1400 from The Yellow Book of Lecan entitled The Settling of the Manor of Tara, in which verse 34 states-

daughter of Toga of the grey stormy sea,

at that time ’twas a woman,

she from whom Sliabh Raisen is named.

The earliest surviving mention of the name occurs in the Lebor Gabála Érenn or Book of Invasions (c.1100) which lists the battles fought against the Vassal Tribes of Ireland by the high-king Túathal Techtmar in c.76 A.D.- He fought the battle of Raissen against Roiscderg of the kingship of Omrann, (Ro-fích cath Raissen fri Roiscderg ríge Omrann). Another early mention is in the Annals of the Four Masters for the year 1111 AD- A predatory excursion was made by Toirdhealbhach Ua Conchobhair and he plundered Tearmann-Dabheog. Another predatory excursion was made by him; and he plundered as far as Beann-Eachlabhra, Sliabh-Ruisen and Loch-Eirne, (Creach lá Toirrdhealbhach Ua c-Conchobhair, go ro aircc Termann Dá Bheócc. Creach aile lais, gur ro aircc co Beind Eachlabhra, co Sliabh Rusén, & go Loch Erne). The Annals of Tigernach for the same year state- A raid by Toirdhealbhach Ó Conchobhair so that he plundered Termonn da Beoóic. Another raid by him in which he plundered up to Binaghlon and Slieve Rushel and Lough Erne, (Crech la Tairrdelbach O Concobair, cor' airg Termund Da Beoóc. Crech aile lais cor' airg co Bend Eachlabra & co Sliab Raissen & co Loch Eirne). Chronicon Scotorum for the same year states- A raid by Tairdelbach ua Conchobuir and he plundered Termonn Dabeoc. Another raid by him and he plundered to Benn Eclapra and to Sliab Rusen to Loch Érne, (Creach la Toirrdealbach h. Concupair gur airg Termann Dabeoc. Creach ele les gur airg go Binn Eclapra & go Sliabh Rusen & go Loch Erne).

A poem about the River Shannon, composed at the beginning of the 17th century by Tadg Óg Ó hUiginn (born 1582), states in stanza 4: Mar mhusglas do mhór-bhuinne goirid bheag ó Shliabh Raisean, nochan ó Bhrian Bhóroimhe do budh cóir bheith dot bhaisdeadh (As thy mighty current awakens but a little space from Slieve Rushen, it is not after Brian Boru that it were right to christen thee).

== History ==
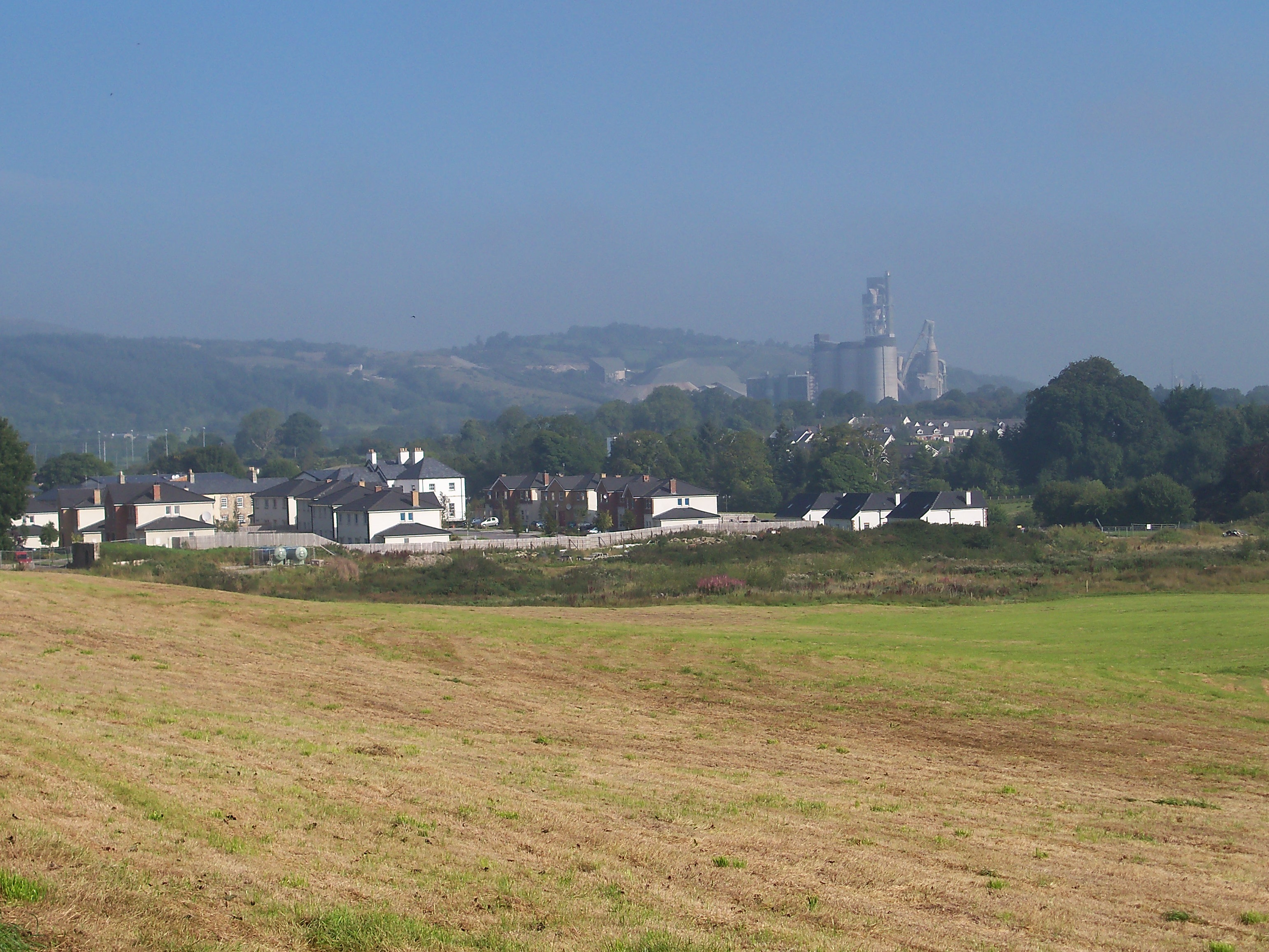
Ballyconnell with Slieve Rushen in the background

The mountain has been inhabited since at least 3,000 B.C. as is evident from the ancient court cairns and wedge tombs still surviving, such as in the townlands of Doon (Tomregan), Aughrim and Aghnacally.

In the 1609 Plantation of Ulster, Slieve Rushen formed part of lands which were granted to John Sandford of Castle Doe, County Donegal by letters patent dated 7 July 1613 (Pat. 11 James I – LXXI – 38, ‘Slewrussell’). The grant basically included the top of the mountain only, as the townlands on the lower slopes had already been granted to other grantees in the Plantation, as appears on the 1609 Baronial maps and in later grants. The mountain was later sold by Sandford to his wife's uncle Toby Caulfeild, 1st Baron Caulfeild, Master of the Ordnance and Caulfield had the sale confirmed by letters patent of 12 July 1620 (Pat. 19 James I. XI. 45 ‘Slewrussell’). Coincidentally the mountain was later part owned by John Sandford's daughter, Magdalen Gwyllym the wife of Thomas Gwyllym, the owner of the Ballyconnell estate.

Myles 'The Slasher' O'Reilly fought the Battle of Sliabh Russell against Captain Galbraith in the 1641 Rebellion, according to Dr. Thomas Fitzsimons writing in 1670. Conchabhar Ó Luinín in a list of Irish battles of 1641, which he composed in the 17th century, mentioned: Briseadh Shleibhe Roisil air Eirennea[c]huibh ('The defeat of the Irish at Sliabh Russell').

After the Battle of Scarrifholis on 21 June 1650, at the end of the Irish Confederate Wars, the defeated Irish rebels scattered and according to the journal of Colonel Henry McTully O'Neill- After this, every one shifted for himself the best he could, except some parties who kept out about Sleaue Russell in Ulster, no general protection granted.

== Music ==
A traditional Irish jig, the Slieve Russell, is named after the mountain.

== See also ==
- List of mountains in Ireland
