= Castle Balfour =

Ruined castle in County Fermanagh, Northern Ireland

Coordinates: 54.2523°N 7.4423°W

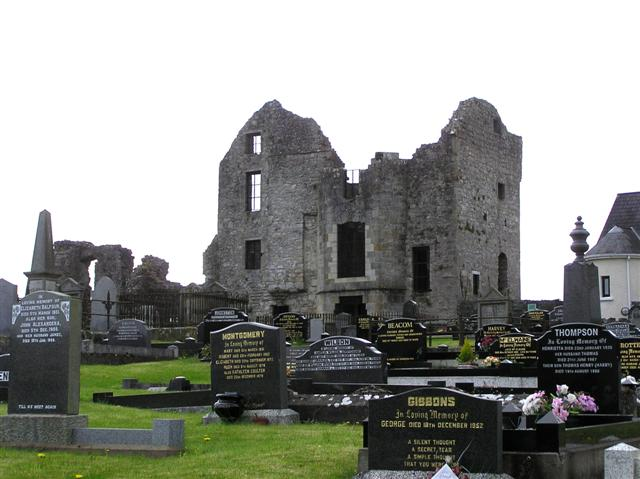
- Castle Balfour, Lisnaskea, County Fermanagh, Northern Ireland

- Location within Northern Ireland
- Irish grid reference: H3634
- District: Fermanagh and Omagh
- County: County Fermanagh
- Country: Northern Ireland
- Sovereign state: United Kingdom
- Postcode district: BT
- Dialling code: 028, +44 28
- UK Parliament: Fermanagh and South Tyrone
- NI Assembly: Fermanagh and South Tyrone

Castle Balfour is a castle situated in Lisnaskea, County Fermanagh, Northern Ireland. It sits at the edge of the parish graveyard just west of Main Street. The castle is a State Care Historic Monument sited in the townland of Castle Balfour Demesne, in the Fermanagh and Omagh district area, at grid ref: H3622 3369.

== History ==
Castle-skeagh was granted to Michael Balfour, Lord Balfour of Burleigh from Fife, Scotland, by King James I in the Plantation of Ulster. He sold his lands in Fermanagh to his younger brother James, Lord Balfour of Glenawley in 1615. In 1618/19 Captain Nicholas Pynnar reported that Balfour had begun his building at Castle-skeagh. The village of Lisnaskea developed around it. The castle was altered in 1652 and damaged in 1689. The last person to possess and inhabit the Castle was James Haire (1737–1833) who leased the castle from John Creighton, Earl Erne. James Haire and his family ceased to occupy the castle after it was destroyed by an arson-based fire in 1803. His mother, Phoebe Haire, was killed by the fire. It is believed that the perpetrator of the fire was a member of the Maguire clan. Major conservation and restoration was undertaken in the 1960s and further conservation work was completed in the late 1990s.

Evidence of an earlier ringfort indicates the area had been inhabited from very early times. In Castle Balfour Demesne, slight surface evidence for a fosse between two banks was revealed after excavation to have been 2 m deep. Attempts to find the outer fosse of a bivallate ringfort revealed 'no distinct, steep edges' contrasting with the steeply cut inner fosse. Radiocarbon dates of 359-428 AD were found from the ringfort at Castle Balfour.

== Features ==
In 1618/19 Captain Nicholas Pynnar reported that Balfour had 'laid the foundation of a bawne of lime and stone 70 ft square, of which the two sides are raised 15 ft high. There is also a castle of the same length, of which the one half is built two stories high and is to be three stories and a half high'. Castle Balfour was a long, rectangular three storey building, on a north–south axis, the main block being 26 m by 8 m. It had a square wing to the east and west and a later rectangular block on the northern end. It has the style of a Scottish castle and the building is thought to be the work of Lowland Scots masons. The surviving castle is in a T plan with an entrance with gun-loops. The castle has vaulted rooms and a kitchen with fireplace and oven on the ground floor, main dwelling rooms on the first floor and corbelled turrets with gun slits.

== See also ==
- List of castles in Northern Ireland
