= Knockninny =

Knockninny Cnoc Ninnidh (Irish)
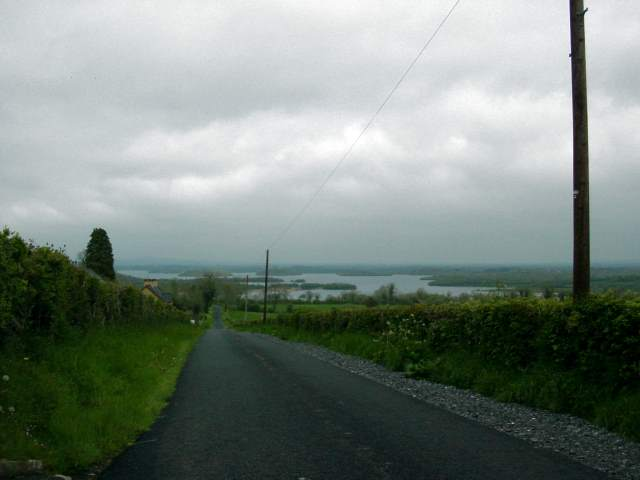
- Minor road up Knockninny Hill - geograph.org.uk - 382857

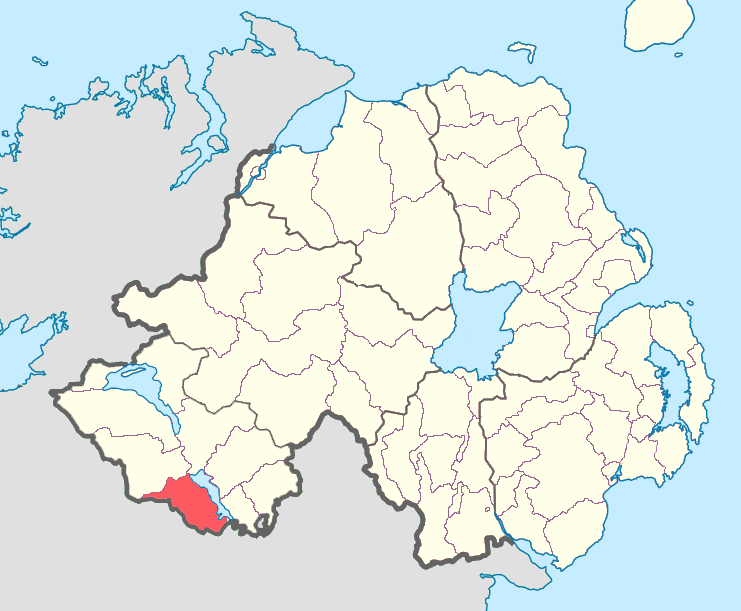
- Location of Knockninny, County Fermanagh, Northern Ireland.
- Sovereign state: United Kingdom
- Jurisdiction: Northern Ireland
- Province: Ulster
- County: Fermanagh

Knockninny (from Irish Cnoc Ninnidh 'St. Ninnidh's hill') is a barony in County Fermanagh, Northern Ireland. To its east lies Upper Lough Erne, and it is bordered by four other baronies in Northern Ireland: Clanawley to the north-west; Tirkennedy to the north; Magherastephana to the north-east; and Coole to the east. It also borders two baronies in the Republic of Ireland: Loughtee Lower to the south; and Tullyhaw to the south-west.

== History ==
Knockninny is believed to takes its name from St. Ninnidh, a 6th-century saint. St. Ninnid is listed as one of the "twelve apostles of Ireland", and bore the epithet of Saobhruisc meaning "squinting", given rise to the names; "the squinting saint" or "one-eyed saint". The hill of St. Ninnid lies on the southern shore of Upper Lough Erne.

Before 1450 there is no mention of this barony's name, however the land is noted as being an early Maguire stronghold, with a MacManus (Irish: Mac Maghnuis) sept of Clan Maguire centered here.

== List of main settlements ==
- Derrylin

== List of civil parishes ==
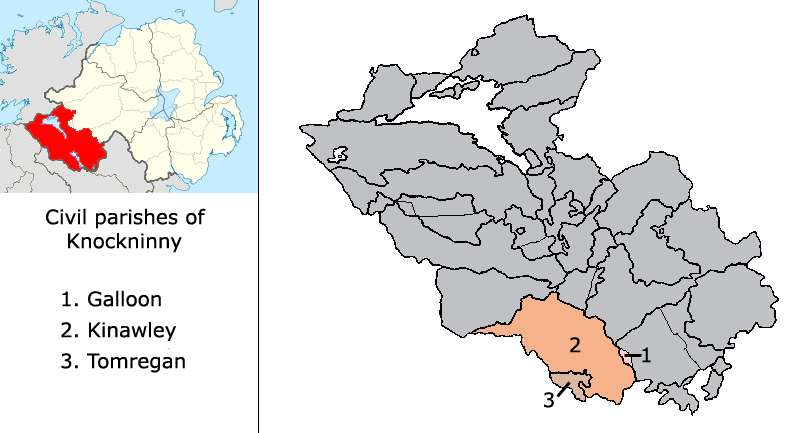
Civil parishes within the barony of Knockninny, County Fermanagh, Northern Ireland

Below is a list of civil parishes in Knockninny:

- Gallon (split with baronies of Clankelly and Coole)
- Kinawley (also partly in barony of Clanawley, County Fermanagh and Tullyhaw, County Cavan)
- Tomregan

== See also ==
- Ninnidh
