= Tullyhaw =

Tullyhaw Teallach Eathach / Teallach Eachdhach (Irish)
- Barony
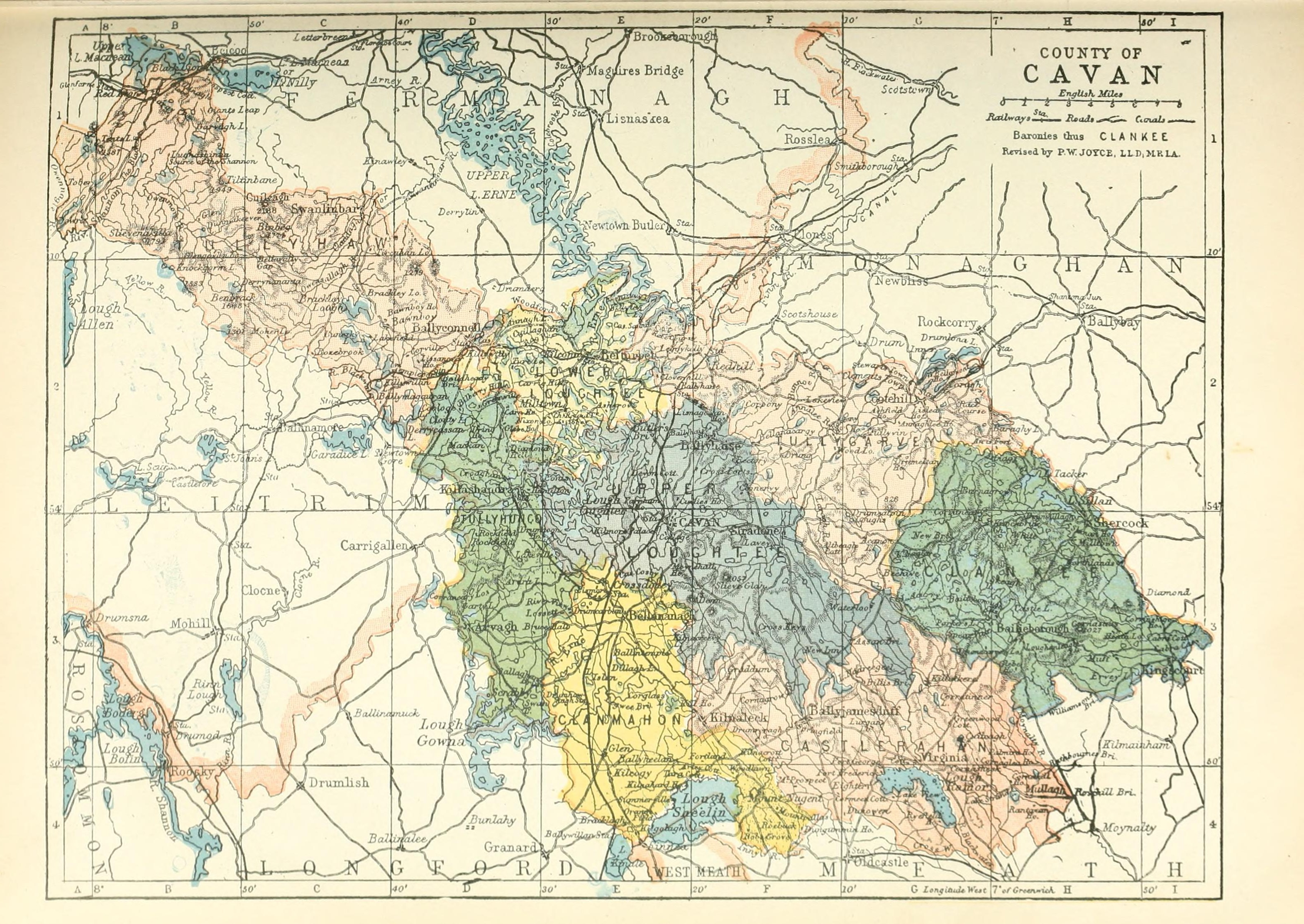
- Barony map of County Cavan, 1900; Tullyhaw is in the northwest, coloured peach.

- Location within Ireland
- Coordinates: 54°9′N 7°45′W
- Sovereign state: Ireland
- Province: Ulster
- County: County Cavan

Area
  - Total: 363.62 km^{2} (140.39 sq mi)

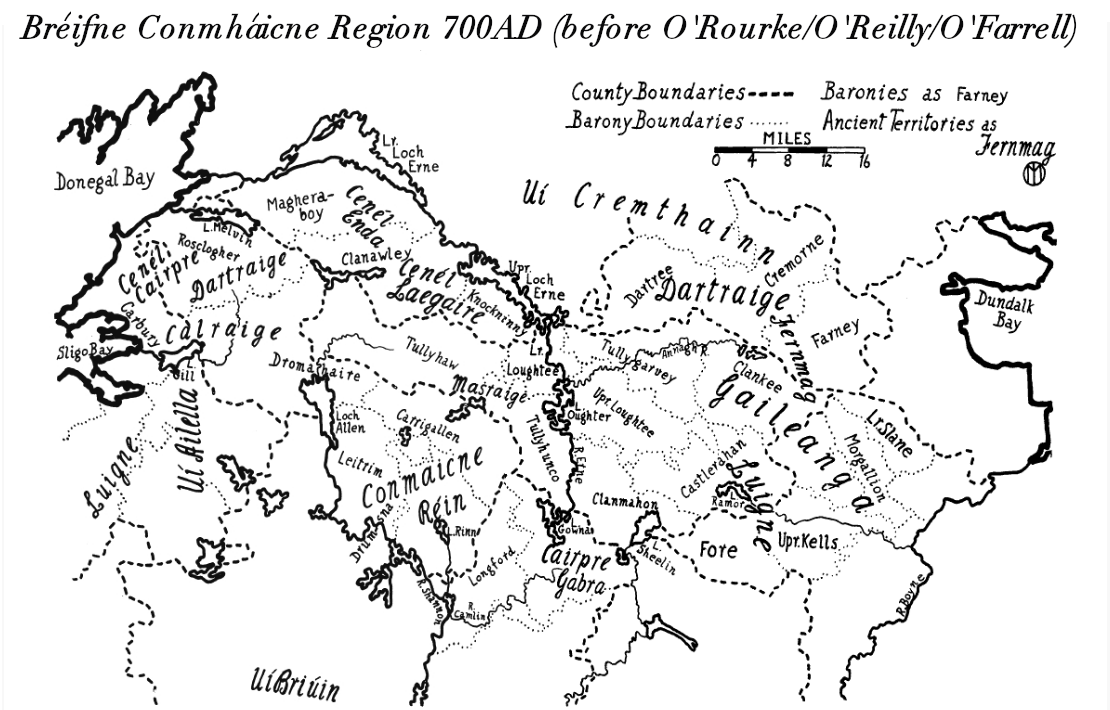
Map of Breifne in AD 700; Tullyhaw is seen in the centre, near the Masraige territory.

Tullyhaw (Irish: Teallach Eathach, which means 'the Territory of Eochaidh', an ancestor of the McGoverns, who lived c. 650 AD) is a Barony in County Cavan in Ireland. The area has been in constant occupation since pre-4000 BC. Located in the northwest of the county, it has been referred to as Cavan's panhandle. Tullyhaw was originally a túath within West Bréifne. It was later absorbed into East Bréifne in the sixteenth century.

In 1579, East Bréifne, then part of Connacht, was made a shire. The shire was named County Cavan, being named after Cavan (Irish: An Cabhán), the area's main town. The administration remained in the control of the local Irish dynasty and subject to the Brehon and Canon Law.

In 1584, Sir John Perrot formed the shire into a county in Ulster. It was subdivided into seven baronies:

- two of which were assigned to Sir John O'Reilly and
- three to other members of the family;
- two remaining, possessed by the septs of
  - McKiernan Clan and
  - Mac Shamhráin (McGovern or Magauran)

The last one, Tullyhaw, encompassed the mountains bordering on O'Rourke's country, and was left subject to the ancient tenures and exactions of their Irish lord.

== Settlements ==
=== Civil parishes ===
- Templeport
  - Ballymagauran
  - Bawnboy
  - Swanlinbar is positioned on an important route between the pre-Norman kingdoms of the Connachta and the Ulad. It is dominated by steep mountains shaped during the last Ice Age over 12,000 years ago
  - Magh Slécht
- Tomregan
  - Ballyconnell
- Killinagh
- Kinawley (also partly in baronies of Clanawley and Knockninny, both in County Fermanagh)

=== Towns ===
- Ballyconnell
- Blacklion
- Swanlinbar

== People ==
- Tigernmas, High King of Ireland; killed at Magh Slécht
- Conall Cernach; killed near Ballyconnell
- Conall Gulban; killed at Magh Slécht
- Dallan Forgaill
- John McGovern VC
- Seán Quinn
