= Derryginny =

Townland in County Cavan, Ireland

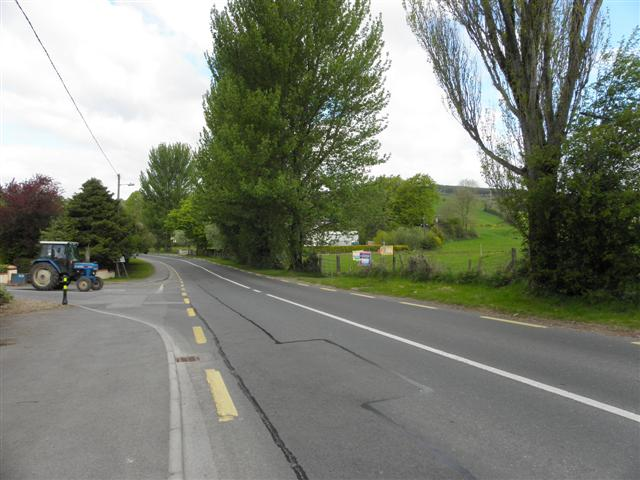
N87 Road at Derryginny townland, Ballyconnell, Tomregan, County Cavan, Ireland, heading north-west.

Derryginny is a townland in the Parish of Tomregan, Barony of Tullyhaw, County Cavan, Ireland.

== Etymology ==
The townland name is an anglicisation of the Gaelic placename "Doire Goinimhe" which means the 'Oakwood of the Sand', which possibly derives either from the sandbanks which form along the rivers running through it or from the large quarry on its northwest boundary. The 1609 Ulster Plantation Baronial map spells the name as Dirrigonie. A 1610 grant spells it as Dirregenny. The Irish State Papers for 1610 spell it as Diroginy. A 1630 Inquisition spells it as Derrogeny.The 1652 Commonwealth Survey spells it as Direganny. The 1659 Down Survey map spells it as Derygenny. The 1663 Hearth Money Rolls spell it as Dirigny. A 1666 grant spells it Derrogenny alias Derrygenny. William Petty's 1685 map spells it as Deregeny. The 1790 Cavan Carvaghs list spells the name as Dirreginny.

== Geography ==
It is bounded on the north by Doon, Tomregan and Gortoorlan townlands, on the west by Snugborough and Carrowmore, County Cavan townlands, on the south by Lecharrownahone townland and on the east by Annagh, County Cavan, Agharaskilly and Cullyleenan townlands. Its chief geographical features are the Shannon-Erne Waterway which flows north along its eastern boundary, the Crooked River (Ireland), another small stream falling from Slieve Rushen which exits into the canal beside Ballyconnell Bridge and a central drumlin hill of blue sandy clay which rises over 200 feet above sea level. Derryginny is traversed by Church Street, Bridge Street, the N87 road (Ireland), the R205 road (Ireland), Derryginny lane, Carrowmore lane and by the disused Cavan & Leitrim Railway. The townland covers 126 statute acres, including three acres of water.

== History ==
The earliest surviving reference to the townland is in an account of the death of the Ulster hero Conall Cernach, who was killed c.1 AD, when he attempted to cross the ford called Ath na Mianna from the townland of Cullyleenan over the Woodford River to the opposite townland of Derryginny. In the fifth century AD, the townland formed part of the lands owned by the Masraige clan.

From medieval times until 1606, the townland formed part of the lands owned by the McGovern (name) clan. Richard Tyrrell of Tyrrellspass, County Westmeath, purchased the townland c.1606 from Cormack McGovern, who was probably the son of Tomas Óg mac Brian Mág Samhradháin, who reigned as chief of the McGovern clan from 1584. A schedule, dated 31 July 1610, of the lands Tyrrell owned in Tullyhaw prior to the Ulster Plantation included: Diroginy, one cartron (a cartron was about 30 acres of arable land). In the Plantation of Ulster, Tyrrell swapped his lands in Derryginny for additional land in the barony of Tullygarvey where he lived at the time. In a grant dated 23 June 1610, along with other lands, King James VI and I then granted the townland as: one poll of Dirregenny, to Hugh Culme, esquire, as part of the "Manor of Calva". Culme then surrendered his interest in Derryginny to Walter Talbot of Ballyconnell. Walter Talbot died on 26 June 1625 at Ballyconnell and his son James Talbot succeeded to the Derryginny lands aged just 10 years. An Inquisition held in Cavan Town on 20 September 1630 stated that Walter Talbot's lands included one poll in Derrogeny. James Talbot married Helen Calvert, the daughter of George Calvert, 1st Baron Baltimore of Maryland, USA, in 1635 and had a son Colonel George Talbot who owned an estate in Cecil County, Maryland which he named Ballyconnell in honour of his native town in Cavan. George Talbot was appointed Surveyor-General of Maryland in 1683. In the aftermath of the Irish Rebellion of 1641, James Talbot's estate in Ballyconnell was confiscated in the Cromwellian Act for the Settlement of Ireland 1652 because he was a Catholic and he was granted an estate in 1655 at Castle Rubey, County Roscommon instead. He died in 1687.

By 1652 the Irish rebels in the Ballyconnell area had been defeated and the area was put under the control of the Cromwellian captain Thomas Gwyllym. He was a native of Glenavy, County Antrim where his father, Rev. Meredith Gwyllym, was vicar of the parishes of Glenavy, Camlin, Tullyrusk, Ballinderry & Magheragall from 1622 until sometime after 1634. Gwyllym's name first appears in the area as the owner of the Ballyconnell estate in the 1652 Commonwealth Survey, also as a Cavan Commissioner in the 1660 Hearth Money Ordinances and in the 1663 Hearth Money Rolls he has five hearths in Ballyconnell. In the Hearth Money Rolls compiled on 29 September 1663, there were two Hearth Tax payers in Dirigny- Richard Harrison and Richard Harrison the younger, both of whom had one hearth. After the restoration of King Charles II to the throne in 1660, James Talbot tried to have the Ballyconnell estate restored to him but a final grant was made to Thomas Gwyllym in August 1666, which included 63 acres & 2 roods in Derrogenny alias Derrygenny. Thomas Gwyllym died in 1681 and his son Colonel Meredith Gwyllym inherited the Ballyconnell estate, including Derryginny. Colonel Meredith Gwyllym died in 1711 and the Ballyconnell estate passed to his eldest son, Meredith Gwyllym.

A deed dated 2 May 1724 by the aforesaid Meredith Gwyllym includes the townland as Derrogeny alias Derrygenny.

The Gwyllym estate was sold for £8,000 in 1724 to Colonel Alexander Montgomery (1686–1729) of Convoy House, County Donegal, M.P. for Donegal Borough, 1725 to 1727, and for Donegal County, 1727 to 1729.

A lease dated 14 May 1728 by the aforesaid Alexander Montgomery included Derrygowny alias Derrygannan.

Montgomery died in 1729 and left the Ballyconnell estate to his nephew George Leslie, who then assumed the name of George Leslie Montgomery. George Leslie Montgomery was M.P. for Strabane, County Tyrone from 1765 to 1768 and for County Cavan from 1770 to 1787, when he died and left the Ballyconnell estate to his son George Montgomery, whose estate was administered by the Court of Chancery as he was a lunatic, George Montgomery died in 1841, and his estate went to his Enery cousins of Bawnboy. In 1856 they sold the estate to take advantage of its increased value owing to the opening of the Woodford Canal through the town in the same year. The estate, including Derryginny, was split up among different purchasers and maps & details of previous leases of the sold parts are still available.

The Tithe Applotment Books for 1827 list the following tithepayers in the townland- Moore, Sturdy, Netterfield, Flood, Gwynne, Hannon, Cochrane.

The Ordnance Survey Name Books for 1836 give the following description of the townland- Doire gainimhe, 'oak wood of the sand'. Centre of parish. Property of Montgomery. Rent £2 per arable acre. Soil is blue sandy clay. A good road South to West. A limestone quarry.

The Derryginny Valuation Office Field books are available for 1840.

Griffith's Valuation of 1857 lists the landlords of the townland as Magee and Netterfield and the tenants as Gwynne, Graham, Schoolhouse, Small, Kells, Netterfield, Donohoe, Caffrey, Wilson and Hannon.

In 2017 an award-winning documentary was made about a Derryginny farmer, 85-year-old Raymond Ovens.

== Derryginny Schools ==
In 1826 there were two schools in Derryginny. One was a pay-school constructed of stone and lime which cost £200. The headmaster was William Spence, a Protestant, who was paid £40 per annum. There were 90 pupils, 50 boys and 40 girls, of whom 45 were Roman Catholic and 45 were Church of Ireland. Holy Scripture books were read. It was supported by the Society for Discountenancing Vice, the Kildare Place Society and the local Church of Ireland rector who contributed £10 per annum. The other school was a free working-school for girls in a separate room in the above school. The headmistress was Mary Veitch, a Protestant, who was paid £10 per annum. There were 34 girls, of whom 24 were Roman Catholic and 10 were Church of Ireland. No Holy Scripture books were read. The Dúchas Folklore Collection gives an account of Derryginny Tanyard School of the 1800s: There was a school situated in my district in the year 1800. The children were all taught indoors. The local name for it was the Tanyard School. The man who taught in this school was "Barney Wynn". He was paid by the people who attended the school. The subjects were, "reading and writing" and he taught some Irish. The people used to spell in Irish and they wrote with cutters on slates. The children were seated on larger logs or flags and other times they were standing up. Another account in the same collection states: There was an old school in Derryginny long ago. John Reilly taught in it. The school was in an old house. The boys spoke Irish and they wrote on slates. There was no seats. They had to sit on turf. Every day the boys had to bring a turf under their arms.

== Census ==
Year	Population	Males	Females	Total Houses	Uninhabited
1841	44	18	26	8	0
1851	30	13	17	8	0
1861	39	17	22	10	0
1871	23	13	10	8	2
1881	24	11	13	6	0
1891	17	7	10	5	0

In the 1901 census of Ireland, there are six families listed in the townland, apart from those on the Derryginny side of Church Street.

In the 1911 census of Ireland, there were six families in the townland, apart from those on the Derryginny side of Church Street.

== Antiquities ==
1. Tomregan Parish Hall (erected in 1949)
2. Tomregan Church of Ireland School (originally built in 1820 and rebuilt in 1967)
3. Tomregan Masonic Hall (erected in 1911)Photo geograph.ie
4. Ballyconnell Bridge (erected 1830s)
5. The Cavan and Leitrim Railway Red Bridge (erected in 1887)
6. Rose Bank House (a Georgian house built in 1812 as a Church of Ireland rectory.).
7. Two former buildings were the Star Ballroom (opened on 11 February 1949) and the Tannery.
8. Derryginny's chief claim to fame is that it is the location of the ford at which the Ulster hero Conall Cernach was killed and from which the town of Ballyconnell was named.
