= Mucklagh =

Townland in Co. Cavan, Ireland

Mucklagh is a townland in the Parish of Tomregan, Barony of Tullyhaw, County Cavan, Ireland.

== Etymology ==
The townland name is an anglicisation of the Gaelic placename Muclach which means 'A place where pigs feed'. The oldest surviving mention of the name is in the 1609 Ulster Plantation Baronial map where it is spelled Mucklogh, with a sub-division named Skeagh (which is Gaelic for "The Whitethorn Bush"). A 1610 grant spells the names as Mocklagh and Skeagh. A 1630 Inquisition spells the names as Mucklagh and Skeagh. In the 1652 Commonwealth Survey it is spelled Mucklagh. The 1659 Down Survey map spells it as Skeagh & Muckelagh. The 1663 Hearth Money Rolls spell it as Muckla. A 1666 grant spells the names as Skeagh and Mucklagh. William Petty's 1685 map spells it as Skeagh and Muckela. The 1790 Cavan Carvaghs list spells the name as Mucklagh and Skeagh. Ambrose Leet's 1814 Directory spells the name as Mucklagh.

== Geography ==
It is bounded on the north by Aughrim townland, on the east by Gortawee & Rakeelan townlands, on the south by Doon (Tomregan) townland and on the west by Gortoorlan & Snugborough townlands. Its chief geographical features are some mountain streams, forestry plantations and Slieve Rushen mountain, on whose south-eastern slope it lies, reaching an altitude of 300 meters above sea-level. The townland is traversed by Mucklagh Lane. According to the Dúchas School's Collection the lane was made as part of the public works carried out in the 1840s as a result of the Great Famine (Ireland). In the same collection is a description of Mucklagh in 1938. Mucklagh covers an area of 212 hectares. A grouping of local houses in the townland was called Oddity Town.

== History ==
In the Plantation of Ulster by grant dated 23 June 1610, along with other lands, King James VI and I granted one poll each in Mocklagh and Skeagh to Hugh Culme, esquire, as part of the Manor of Calva. Culme then surrendered his interest in Mucklagh to Walter Talbot of Ballyconnell. Walter Talbot died on 26 June 1625 at Ballyconnell and his son James Talbot succeeded to the Mucklagh lands aged just 10 years. An Inquisition held in Cavan Town on 20 September 1630 stated that Walter Talbot's lands included one poll each in Mucklagh and Skeagh. James Talbot married Helen Calvert, the daughter of George Calvert, 1st Baron Baltimore of Maryland, USA, in 1635 and had a son Colonel George Talbot who owned an estate in Cecil County, Maryland which he named Ballyconnell in honour of his native town in Cavan. George Talbot was appointed Surveyor-General of Maryland in 1683. In the aftermath of the Irish Rebellion of 1641, James Talbot's estate in Ballyconnell was confiscated in the Cromwellian Act for the Settlement of Ireland 1652 because he was a Catholic and he was granted an estate in 1655 at Castle Rubey, County Roscommon instead. He died in 1687.

By 1652 the Irish rebels in the Ballyconnell area had been defeated and the area was put under the control of the Cromwellian captain Thomas Gwyllym. He was a native of Glenavy, County Antrim where his father, Rev. Meredith Gwyllym, was vicar of the parishes of Glenavy, Camlin, Tullyrusk, Ballinderry & Magheragall from 1622 until sometime after 1634. Gwyllym's name first appears in the area as the owner in the 1652 Commonwealth Survey, which lists the townland as belonging to Captain Gwilliams and the tenant as Daniell McDonoghy, (who also appears as tenant of the adjoining townland of Rakeelan). Gwyllym was also a Cavan Commissioner in the 1660 Hearth Money Ordinances and in the 1664 Hearth Money Rolls he has five hearths in Ballyconnell. In the Hearth Money Rolls compiled on 29 September 1663, there were four Hearth Tax payers in Muckla- Donell McDonoghie, Phelemy McDonaghy, Knoghor McDonaghy and Donell Oge McDonoghy, all of whom had one hearth. After the restoration of King Charles II to the throne in 1660, James Talbot tried to have the Ballyconnell estate restored to him but a final grant was made to Thomas Gwyllym in August 1666, which included 207 acres-2 roods-16 perches in Skeagh and Mucklagh. Thomas Gwyllym died in 1681 and his son Colonel Meredith Gwyllym inherited the Ballyconnell estate, including Mucklagh. Colonel Meredith Gwyllym died in 1711 and the Ballyconnell estate passed to his eldest son, Meredith Gwyllym.

A deed dated 2 May 1724 by the aforesaid Meredith Gwyllym includes the townland as Skeagh and Mucklagh.

The Gwyllym estate was sold for £8,000 in 1724 to Colonel Alexander Montgomery (1686–1729) of Convoy House, County Donegal, M.P. for Donegal Borough 1725 to 1727 & for Donegal County 1727 to 1729.

A lease dated 14 May 1728 by the aforesaid Alexander Montgomery included Skeagh and Mucklagh.

Montgomery died in 1729 and left the Ballyconnell estate to his nephew George Leslie, who then assumed the name of George Leslie Montgomery. George Leslie Montgomery was M.P. for Strabane, County Tyrone from 1765 to 1768 and for County Cavan from 1770 to 1787, when he died and left the Ballyconnell estate to his son George Montgomery, whose estate was administered by the Court of Chancery as he was a lunatic, and descended as part of the Ballyconnell estate since then. George Montgomery died in 1841 and his estate went to his Enery cousins of Bawnboy. In 1856 they sold the estate to take advantage of its increased value owing to the opening of the Woodford Canal through the town in the same year. The estate, including Mucklagh, was split up among different purchasers and maps & details of previous leases of the sold parts are still available.

In the Cavan Poll Book of 1761, there was one person registered to vote in Mucklagh in the Irish general election, 1761: Alexander Hewit. He was entitled to cast two votes. The four election candidates were Charles Coote, 1st Earl of Bellomont and Lord Newtownbutler (later Brinsley Butler, 2nd Earl of Lanesborough), both of whom were then elected Member of Parliament for Cavan County. The losing candidates were George Montgomery (MP) of Ballyconnell and Barry Maxwell, 1st Earl of Farnham. Absence from the poll book either meant a resident did not vote or, more likely, was not a freeholder entitled to vote, which would mean most of the inhabitants of Mucklagh.

In the Fermanagh Poll of Electors 1788 there was one Mucklagh resident, Robert Hewitt, who was entitled to vote as he owned land in Gortineddan townland.

The Tithe Applotment Books for 1827 list the following tithepayers in the townland- McKenna, Fitzpatrick, Clements, McCorry, McDonnell, Latimer, McCusker, Curry, McCaffrey.

The Ordnance Survey Name Books for 1836 give the following description of the townland- Muclach, 'a place where pigs feed; a stye, a piggery'. North of parish. Property of Montgomery. Rent 16 shillings to £1 per arable acre. 50 acres of mountain and pasture. A large limestone quarry, a gravelly soil resting on limestone. No road.

The Mucklagh Valuation Office Field books are available for February 1840.

Griffith's Valuation of 1857 lists the landlords of the townland as the Annesley Estate and Latimer & the tenants as Cosgrove, McTeague, Curry, Drum, Latimer, Hewitt, Lawrence, McCaffrey, McKenna, Kane, Fitzpatrick, McMullen and Seaton.

== Census ==
Year	Population	Males	Females	Total Houses	Uninhabited
1841	95	56	39	13	0
1851	71	37	34	15	1
1861	68	35	33	13	0
1871	75	36	29	13	0
1881	74	36	38	12	0
1891	48	25	23	10	0

In the 1901 census of Ireland, there are thirteen families listed in the townland.

In the 1911 census of Ireland, there are ten families listed in the townland.

== Antiquities ==
1. An old limestone quarry.
2. Mountview House.
