= Rakeelan =

Townland in County Cavan, Ireland

Rakeelan is a townland in the Parish of Tomregan, Barony of Tullyhaw, County Cavan, Ireland.

== Etymology ==
The townland name is an anglicisation of the Gaelic placename "Rath Caolain" which is usually given as 'Keelan's Fort' but a more likely explanation is Rath Caolán, meaning 'The Fort of the Little Narrow Place', as the townland is squeezed between the Shannon–Erne Waterway on the east side and Slieve Rushen on the west side. The oldest surviving mention of the name is in the 1609 Ulster Plantation Baronial map where it is spelled Rakellan. A 1610 grant spells it as Rathkeylane. A 1630 Inquisition spells it as Rathkillan. The 1652 Commonwealth Survey spells the name as Rakeelane. The 1663 Hearth Money Rolls spell it as Rakelane. A 1666 grant spells it as Rathkylan. The 1790 Cavan Carvaghs list spells the name as Rakillan.

== Geography ==
It is bounded on the north by Gortawee townland, on the east by Annagh townland, on the south by Doon (Tomregan) townland and on the west by Mucklagh townland. Its chief geographical features are the Shannon-Erne Waterway which flows north along its eastern boundary and a foothill of Slieve Rushen mountain reaching to 228 feet (69 m) above sea-level. Rakeelan is traversed by the R205 road (Ireland) and Mucklagh lane. The townland covers 89 statute acres, including 1-acre (4,000 m^{2}) of water.

== History ==
In the Plantation of Ulster by grant dated 23 June 1610, along with other lands, King James VI and I granted one poll in Rathkeylane to Hugh Culme, esquire, as part of the Manor of Calva. Culme then surrendered his interest in Rakeelan to Walter Talbot of Ballyconnell. Walter Talbot died on 26 June 1625 at Ballyconnell and his son James Talbot succeeded to the Rakeelan lands aged just 10 years. An Inquisition held in Cavan Town on 20 September 1630 stated that Walter Talbot's lands included one poll in Rathkillan. James Talbot married Helen Calvert, the daughter of George Calvert, 1st Baron Baltimore of Maryland, USA, in 1635 and had a son Colonel George Talbot who owned an estate in Cecil County, Maryland which he named Ballyconnell in honour of his native town in Cavan. George Talbot was appointed Surveyor-General of Maryland in 1683. In the aftermath of the Irish Rebellion of 1641, James Talbot's estate in Ballyconnell was confiscated in the Cromwellian Act for the Settlement of Ireland 1652 because he was a Catholic and he was granted an estate in 1655 at Castle Rubey, County Roscommon instead. He died in 1687.

By 1652 the Irish rebels in the Ballyconnell area had been defeated and the area was put under the control of the Cromwellian captain Thomas Gwyllym. He was a native of Glenavy, County Antrim where his father, Rev. Meredith Gwyllym, was vicar of the parishes of Glenavy, Camlin, Tullyrusk, Ballinderry & Magheragall from 1622 until sometime after 1634. Gwyllym's name first appears in the area as the owner in the 1652 Commonwealth Survey, which lists the townland as belonging to Captain Gwilliams. Gwyllym was also a Cavan Commissioner in the 1660 Hearth Money Ordinances and in the 1663 Hearth Money Rolls he has five hearths in Ballyconnell. In the Hearth Money Rolls compiled on 29 September 1663, there were two Hearth Tax payers in Rakelane- Brian O Tumony and Margarett NyGwire, all of whom had one hearth. After the restoration of King Charles II to the throne in 1660, James Talbot tried to have the Ballyconnell estate restored to him but a final grant was made to Thomas Gwyllym in August 1666, which included 107 acres-2 roods-32 perches in Gortewee alias Gortevill alias Rathkylan, so the townland seems to have been merged with Gortawee at that time. Thomas Gwyllym died in 1681 and his son Colonel Meredith Gwyllym inherited the Ballyconnell estate, including Rakeelan. Colonel Meredith Gwyllym died in 1711 and the Ballyconnell estate passed to his eldest son, Meredith Gwyllym.

A deed dated 2 May 1724 by the aforesaid Meredith Gwyllym includes the townland as Gortenure alias Gortevill alias Rathkylan.

The Gwyllym estate was sold for £8,000 in 1724 to Colonel Alexander Montgomery (1686–1729) of Convoy House, County Donegal, M.P. for Donegal Borough 1725 to 1727 & for Donegal County 1727 to 1729.

A lease dated 14 May 1728 by the aforesaid Alexander Montgomery included Gortenure alias Gortevill alias Rathkylan.

Montgomery died in 1729 and left the Ballyconnell estate to his nephew George Leslie, who then assumed the name of George Leslie Montgomery. George Leslie Montgomery was M.P. for Strabane, County Tyrone from 1765 to 1768 and for County Cavan from 1770 to 1787, when he died and left the Ballyconnell estate to his son George Montgomery, whose estate was administered by the Court of Chancery as he was a lunatic, and descended as part of the Ballyconnell estate since then. George Montgomery died in 1841 and his estate went to his Enery cousins of Bawnboy. In 1856 they sold the estate to take advantage of its increased value owing to the opening of the Woodford Canal through the town in the same year. The estate, including Rakeelan, was split up among different purchasers and maps & details of previous leases of the sold parts are still available.

The Tithe Applotment Books for 1827 list the following tithepayers in the townland- Faris, Bedel, McAvinue, Reilly, Hyland, McDaniel, Roe, Sturdy, Plunkett, Benison, McGuire, Montgomery, Fitzsimons, Adbort.

The Ordnance Survey Name Books for 1836 give the following description of the townland- Rath Caoláin, 'Keelan's fort'. Rathkillan. In old times considered part of Gortawee. East of parish. Property of Montgomery. Road North to South. Soil arable and gravelly.

The Rakeelan Valuation Office Field books are available for 1840.

Griffith's Valuation of 1857 lists the landlords of the townland as Benson and the Annesley Estate & the tenants as McDougall, Benson, Gilleese, Glennon, Reilly, Curry, Donohoe, Roe, Clancy, Ferris and Maguire.

In the Dúchas Folklore Collection there is an account by Mr. J. Coleman, Rakeelan in 1938 which states that a long time before that there was a blacksmith's forge in Rakeelan owned by Michael Mills and it was the only one in the district. Another account mentions Michael's field.

== Census ==
Year	Population	Males	Females	Total Houses	Uninhabited
1841	43	17	26	7	0
1851	47	24	23	9	0
1861	56	24	32	9	0
1871	27	13	14	8	0
1881	30	12	18	7	1
1891	27	12	15	6	0

In the 1901 census of Ireland, there are seven families listed in the townland.

In the 1911 census of Ireland, there are five families listed in the townland.
