= Gortawee =

Townland in County Cavan, Ireland

Gortawee Scotchtown
- Townland
- Etymology: "Hugh Boy's Field"
- Interactive map of Gortawee
- Country: Ireland
- County: Cavan
- Elevation: 62 m (203 ft)
- Highest elevation: 62 m (203 ft)

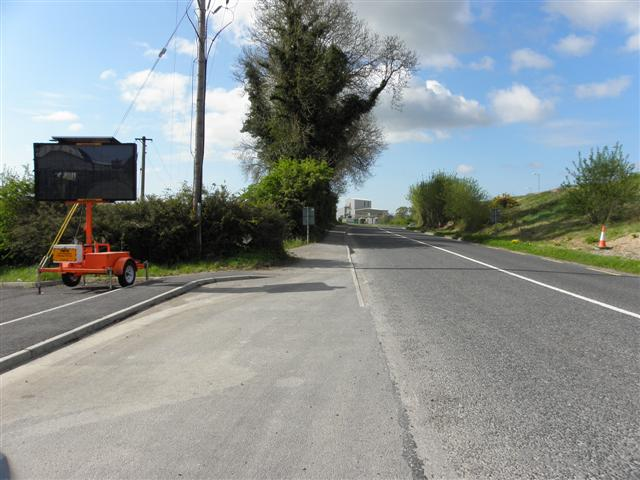
The R205 road at Gortawee, Scotchtown, Tomregan, County Cavan, Ireland, heading SSW towards Ballyconnell town.

Gortawee (also called Scotchtown) is a townland in the Parish of Tomregan, Barony of Tullyhaw, County Cavan, Ireland.

== Etymology ==
The townland name is an anglicisation of the Gaelic placename "Gort Aodh Bhuide" which means 'Hugh Boy's Field'. The oldest surviving mention of the name is in the 1609 Ulster Plantation map where it is spelled as Gortewey. A 1610 grant spells it as Gortewoy. A 1630 Inquisition spells it as Gortewey. The 1652 Commonwealth Survey spells the name as Garteiogh. The 1659 Down Survey map spells it as Gortevill. The 1663 Hearth Money Rolls spell it as Gortewee. A 1666 grant spells it as Gortewee alias Gortevill alias Rathkylan. William Petty's 1685 map spells it as Gartevill. The 1790 Cavan Carvaghs list spells the name as Gortewee. Its modern name 'Scotchtown' is supposedly derived from some Scottish soldiers who settled there. Ambrose Leet's 1814 Directory spells the name as Scott's-town.

== Geography ==
It is bounded on the north by Aughrim townland and by the international border with Fermanagh and Northern Ireland, on the east by Annagh townland, on the south by Rakeelan townland and on the west by Mucklagh townland. Its chief geographical features are the Shannon-Erne Waterway which flows north along its eastern boundary, some tree plantations and a foothill of Slieve Rushen mountain reaching to 203 feet (62 m) above sea-level. Gortawee is traversed by the regional R205 road (Ireland), Aughrim lane and Featherbed lane. The townland covers 135 statute acres, including 1-acre (4,000 m^{2}) of water.

== History ==
The modern townland of Rakeelan formed part of Gortawee in 1666.

In the Plantation of Ulster by grant dated 23 June 1610, along with other lands, King James VI and I granted one poll in Gortewoy to Hugh Culme, esquire, as part of the Manor of Calva. Culme then surrendered his interest in Gortawee to Walter Talbot of Ballyconnell. Walter Talbot died on 26 June 1625 at Ballyconnell and his son James Talbot succeeded to the Gortawee lands aged just 10 years. An Inquisition held in Cavan Town on 20 September 1630 stated that Walter Talbot's lands included one poll in Gortewey. James Talbot married Helen Calvert, the daughter of George Calvert, 1st Baron Baltimore of Maryland, USA, in 1635 and had a son Colonel George Talbot who owned an estate in Cecil County, Maryland which he named Ballyconnell in honour of his native town in Cavan. George Talbot was appointed Surveyor-General of Maryland in 1683. In the aftermath of the Irish Rebellion of 1641, James Talbot's estate in Ballyconnell was confiscated in the Cromwellian Act for the Settlement of Ireland 1652 because he was a Catholic and he was granted an estate in 1655 at Castle Rubey, County Roscommon instead. He died in 1687.

By 1652 the Irish rebels in the Ballyconnell area had been defeated and the area was put under the control of the Cromwellian captain Thomas Gwyllym. He was a native of Glenavy, County Antrim where his father, Rev. Meredith Gwyllym, was vicar of the parishes of Glenavy, Camlin, Tullyrusk, Ballinderry & Magheragall from 1622 until sometime after 1634. Gwyllym's name first appears in the area as the owner in the 1652 Commonwealth Survey, which lists the townland as belonging to Captain Gwilliams. Gwyllym was also a Cavan Commissioner in the 1660 Hearth Money Ordinances and in the 1664 Hearth Money Rolls he has five hearths in Ballyconnell. In the Hearth Money Rolls compiled on 29 September 1663, there were three Hearth Tax payers in Gortewee- John Gilmur, Cohonatt O Skallon and Patricke O Skallan, all of whom had one hearth. After the restoration of King Charles II to the throne in 1660, James Talbot tried to have the Ballyconnell estate restored to him but a final grant was made to Thomas Gwyllym in August 1666, which included 107 acres-2 roods-32 perches in Gortewee alias Gortevill alias Rathkylan, so the townland seems to have been merged with Gortawee at that time. Thomas Gwyllym died in 1681 and his son Colonel Meredith Gwyllym inherited the Ballyconnell estate, including Gortawee. Colonel Meredith Gwyllym died in 1711 and the Ballyconnell estate passed to his eldest son, Meredith Gwyllym.

A deed dated 2 May 1724 by the aforesaid Meredith Gwyllym includes the townland as Gortenure alias Gortevill alias Rathkylan.

The Gwyllym estate was sold for £8,000 in 1724 to Colonel Alexander Montgomery (1686–1729) of Convoy House, County Donegal, M.P. for Donegal Borough 1725 to 1727 & for Donegal County 1727 to 1729.

A lease dated 14 May 1728 by the aforesaid Alexander Montgomery included Gortenure alias Gortevill alias Rathkylan.

Montgomery died in 1729 and left the Ballyconnell estate to his nephew George Leslie, who then assumed the name of George Leslie Montgomery. George Leslie Montgomery was M.P. for Strabane, County Tyrone from 1765 to 1768 and for County Cavan from 1770 to 1787, when he died and left the Ballyconnell estate to his son George Montgomery, whose estate was administered by the Court of Chancery as he was a lunatic, and descended as part of the Ballyconnell estate since then. George Montgomery died in 1841 and his estate went to his Enery cousins of Bawnboy. In 1856 they sold the estate to take advantage of its increased value owing to the opening of the Woodford Canal through the town in the same year. The estate, including Gortawee, was split up among different purchasers and maps & details of previous leases of the sold parts are still available.

In the Cavan Poll Book of 1761, there were two people registered to vote in Gortawee in the Irish general election, 1761: John Clarke and George Irwin. They were each entitled to cast two votes. The four election candidates were Charles Coote, 1st Earl of Bellomont and Lord Newtownbutler (later Brinsley Butler, 2nd Earl of Lanesborough), both of whom were then elected Member of Parliament for Cavan County. The losing candidates were George Montgomery (MP) of Ballyconnell and Barry Maxwell, 1st Earl of Farnham. Absence from the poll book either meant a resident did not vote or, more likely, was not a freeholder entitled to vote, which would mean most of the inhabitants of Gortawee.

The Tithe Applotment Books for 1827 list the following tithepayers in the townland- Mitten, Reilly, Fitzsimons, Bedell, Curry.

The Ordnance Survey Name Books for 1836 give the following description of the townland- Gort Aodha Bhuídhe, 'Hugh Boy's field'. North-east of parish. Property of Montgomery. Rent 16 shillings to £1 per arable acre. Gravelly soil. 16 acres of pasture. A road passes through it. The tenants are poor farmers.

The Gortawee Valuation Office Field books are available for 1840.

Griffith's Valuation of 1857 lists the landlords of the townland as Benson and Reilly & the tenants as Fitzsimons, Maguire, Reilly, Fee, McAvenue, Foster, Baxter, Elliott, Curry, Benson and Roe.

In the Dúchas Folklore Collection there is a description of Scotchstown in 1938 by John McKiernan.

== Census ==
Year	Population	Males	Females	Total Houses	Uninhabited
1841	66	30	36	10	0
1851	27	11	16	4	0
1861	51	28	23	6	0
1871	33	17	16	4	0
1881	24	12	12	5	0
1891	28	10	18	5	0

In the 1901 census of Ireland, there are twelve families listed in the townland.

In the 1911 census of Ireland, there are twelve families listed in the townland.

== Antiquities ==
1. Slieve Russell House.
2. The International Border Crossing checkpoint.
