= Snugborough (County Cavan) =

Townland in County Cavan, Ireland

Coordinates: 53°52′N 9°20′W

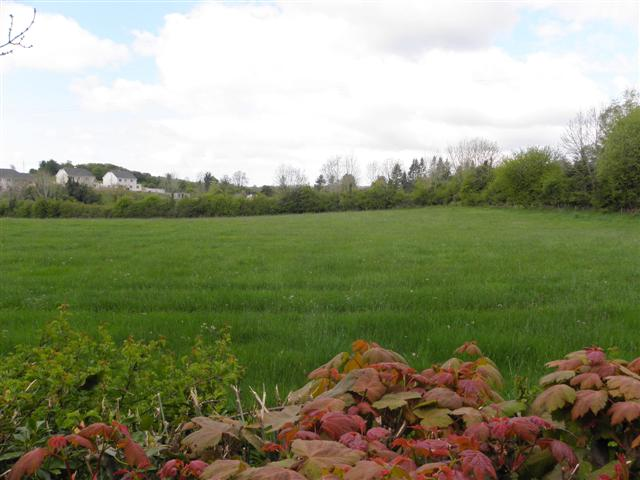
Snugborough townland, Ballyconnell, County Cavan, Ireland. looking west

Snugborough is a townland in the Parish of Tomregan, Barony of Tullyhaw, County Cavan, Ireland.

== Etymology ==
The townland originally formed two divisions, the older Irish names of which were Kealloge and Knockan. Kealloge was an Anglicisation of the Gaelic placename 'Coill Óg', which means The New or Little Wood and it is depicted with this name on the 1609 Ulster Plantation Baronial map. Knockan was an Anglicisation of the Gaelic placename 'Cnocan', which means A little hill. Keiloge formed part of the Manor of Calva which was granted to Walter Talbot in 1610 as part of the Plantation of Ulster. A 1630 Inquisition spells it as Killog. The 1652 Commonwealth Survey spells the names as Keelogg and Knockan. The 1659 Down Survey map spells it as Killoyne (Irish Coill Abhainn, which means 'The Wood of the River'). The 1663 Hearth Money Rolls spell it as Knockane and Killogge. A 1666 grant spells it as Killogey alias Killoyne alias Knockan. William Petty's 1685 map spells it as Killoyne. In 1724 the Calva estate was sold by the Gwyllym family to Colonel Alexander Montgomery (1686–1729). Mrs Montgomery was formerly Miss Elizabeth Percy of Snugborough House, County Wicklow, which was erected in 1695. When she died in December 1724, a few months after her husband bought the Ballyconnell estate, he renamed Kealloge as Snugborough in his wife’s honour. The earliest known reference to the name Snugborough is in the 1761 Cavan Poll Book. The 1790 Cavan Carvaghs list spells the name as Cnockan and Killogg. Ambrose Leet's 1814 Directory spells the name as Snug-borough.

== Geography ==
It is bounded on the north by the international border with Fermanagh and Northern Ireland, on the east by Aughrim, Mucklagh & Gortoorlan townlands, on the south by Derryginny townland and on the west by Carrowmore, County Cavan townland. Its chief geographical features are some mountain streams, a pond on its boundary with Gortoorlan, forestry plantations and Slieve Rushen mountain, on whose southern slope it lies, reaching an altitude of over 1,000 feet (300 m) above sea-level. The townland is traversed by the N87 road (Ireland), Bawnboy Road, Carrowmore Lane and Snugborough Lane. Snugborough covers an area of 499 statute acres, including 7 acres (28,000 m^{2}) of water.

== History ==
From medieval times until 1606, the townland formed part of the lands owned by the McGovern (name) clan. Richard Tyrrell of Tyrrellspass, County Westmeath, purchased the townland c.1606 from Cormack McGovern, who was probably the son of Tomas Óg mac Brian Mág Samhradháin, who reigned as chief of the McGovern clan from 1584. A schedule, dated 31 July 1610, of the lands Tyrrell owned in Tullyhaw prior to the Ulster Plantation included: Kylog, one cartron & Knochan, one cartron (a cartron was about 30 acres of arable land). In the Plantation of Ulster, Tyrrell swapped his lands in Snugborough for additional land in the barony of Tullygarvey where he lived at the time. In a grant dated 23 June 1610, along with other lands, King James VI and I then granted the townland as: one poll of Keiloge, to Hugh Culme, esquire, as part of the "Manor of Calva". Culme then surrendered his interest in Snugborough to Walter Talbot of Ballyconnell. Walter Talbot died on 26 June 1625 at Ballyconnell and his son James Talbot succeeded to the Snugborough lands aged just 10 years. An Inquisition held in Cavan Town on 20 September 1630 stated that Walter Talbot's lands included one poll in Killog. James Talbot married Helen Calvert, the daughter of George Calvert, 1st Baron Baltimore of Maryland, USA, in 1635 and had a son Colonel George Talbot who owned an estate in Cecil County, Maryland which he named Ballyconnell in honour of his native town in Cavan. George Talbot was appointed Surveyor-General of Maryland in 1683. In the aftermath of the Irish Rebellion of 1641, James Talbot's estate in Ballyconnell was confiscated in the Cromwellian Act for the Settlement of Ireland 1652 because he was a Catholic and he was granted an estate in 1655 at Castle Rubey, County Roscommon instead. He died in 1687.

By 1652 the Irish rebels in the Ballyconnell area had been defeated and the area was put under the control of the Cromwellian captain Thomas Gwyllym. He was a native of Glenavy, County Antrim where his father, Rev. Meredith Gwyllym, was vicar of the parishes of Glenavy, Camlin, Tullyrusk, Ballinderry & Magheragall from 1622 until sometime after 1634. Gwyllym's name first appears in the area as the owner of the Ballyconnell estate in the 1652 Commonwealth Survey, also as a Cavan Commissioner in the 1660 Hearth Money Ordinances and in the 1664 Hearth Money Rolls he has five hearths in Ballyconnell. In the Hearth Money Rolls compiled on 29 September 1663, there were two Hearth Tax payers in Killogge- Patricke McConell and Murto Abranan and the Knockane residents who paid were Owen McKernan, Knoghure McKeney and Edmond O Relly, all of whom had one hearth. After the restoration of King Charles II to the throne in 1660, James Talbot tried to have the Ballyconnell estate restored to him but a final grant was made to Thomas Gwyllym in August 1666, which included 115 acres-1 rood-24 perches in Killogey alias Killoyne alias Knockan. Thomas Gwyllym died in 1681 and his son Colonel Meredith Gwyllym inherited the Ballyconnell estate, including Snugborough. Colonel Meredith Gwyllym died in 1711 and the Ballyconnell estate passed to his eldest son, Meredith Gwyllym.

A deed dated 2 May 1724 by the aforesaid Meredith Gwyllym includes the townland as Kilogey alias Killoyne alias Knockan.

The Gwyllym estate was sold for £8,000 in 1724 to Colonel Alexander Montgomery (1686–1729) of Convoy House, County Donegal, M.P. for Donegal Borough 1725 to 1727 & for Donegal County 1727 to 1729.

A lease dated 14 May 1728 by the aforesaid Alexander Montgomery included Killogey alias Killoyne alias Knockan.

Montgomery died in 1729 and left the Ballyconnell estate to his nephew George Leslie, who then assumed the name of George Leslie Montgomery. George Leslie Montgomery was M.P. for Strabane, County Tyrone from 1765 to 1768 and for County Cavan from 1770 to 1787, when he died and left the Ballyconnell estate to his son George Montgomery, whose estate was administered by the Court of Chancery as he was a lunatic, George Montgomery died in 1841 and his estate went to his Enery cousins of Bawnboy. In 1856 they sold the estate to take advantage of its increased value owing to the opening of the Woodford Canal through the town in the same year. The estate, including Snugborough, was split up among different purchasers and maps & details of previous leases of the sold parts are still available.

In the Cavan Poll Book of 1761, there was one person registered to vote in Snugborough in the Irish general election, 1761: Thomas Thornton. He was entitled to cast two votes. The four election candidates were Charles Coote, 1st Earl of Bellomont and Lord Newtownbutler (later Brinsley Butler, 2nd Earl of Lanesborough), both of whom were then elected Member of Parliament for Cavan County. The losing candidates were George Montgomery (MP) of Ballyconnell and Barry Maxwell, 1st Earl of Farnham. Absence from the poll book either meant a resident did not vote or, more likely, was not a freeholder entitled to vote, which would mean most of the inhabitants of Snugborough.

A deed by Gore Ellis of Snugborough is dated 24 Feb 1776.

In the Fermanagh Poll of Electors 1788 there was one Snugborough resident, William Clinging, who was entitled to vote as he owned land in Ports townland in Galloon parish.

In the Irish Rebellion of 1798 Catholics attacked the Protestant soldiers returning from the Battle of Ballinamuck on 8 September 1798. The incident took place at Soldier's Bray, Snugborough.

The Tithe Applotment Books for 1827 list the following tithepayers in the townland- Kernan, Baxter, Hewit, McNight, Moore, McGuire, O'Neil, Gerty, Friel, O'Brien, Conoly, McBryan, Barrat, Seaton, Gilease, McGauran, Saunders, Gibson, Reilly, Donahy, Shenan, Fitzpatrick.

The Ordnance Survey Name Books for 1836 give the following description of the townland- Snugborough. This was formerly a part of Carramore. Property of Montgomery. Half is mountain and pasture. Gravelly soil. 3 forts in south. Poor inhabitants.

The Snugborough Valuation Office Field books are available for February 1840.

Griffith's Valuation of 1857 lists the landlord of the townland as the Annesley Estate & the tenants as- O’Neill, Brien, McBrien, Burns, Donohoe, Gilleese, Carberry, Freehill, Reilly, Geraghty, McGovern, Shanahan, McTaggart, Saunders, Seaton, Gwynne, Gibson, Barrett and Faris.

In the Dúchas Folklore Collection there is a story by Mr J. McCabe in 1938 relates a fairytale that occurred in Snugborough. Another Snugborough fairytale is in the same collection by Thomas O'Reilly, Church Street, Ballyconnell. Also in the same collection is a description of Snugborough in 1938 by Steven O'Brien and also a list of local field-names.

== Snugborough School ==
In the Dúchas Folklore Collection there is an account of Snugborough Hedge School of the 1800s.

== Census ==
Year	Population	Males	Females	Total Houses	Uninhabited
1841	223	112	111	37	0
1851	200	105	95	34	1
1861	131	69	62	25	0
1871	107	48	59	23	0
1881	115	62	53	19	0
1891	106	57	49	21	1

In the 1901 census of Ireland, there are twenty families listed in the townland.

In the 1911 census of Ireland, there are twenty-two families listed in the townland.

== Antiquities ==
1. A medieval earthen ringfort in the southern end of Snugborough, (Site number 1111, page 137, Snugborough townland, in "Archaeological Inventory of County Cavan", Patrick O’Donovan, 1995, where it is described as- Raised circular area (int. dims. 34.8m NE-SW; 32.7m NW-SE) enclosed by a substantial earthen bank and a wide, shallow fosse, both of which have been destroyed at N as a consequence of quarrying. Break in bank at E with traces of accompanying causeway represents original entrance).
2. A medieval earthen ringfort in the southern end of Snugborough, (Site number 1112, page 137, Snugborough townland, in "Archaeological Inventory of County Cavan", Patrick O’Donovan, 1995, where it is described as- Raised D-shaped area (int. dims. c. 34m N-S; c. 24m E-W) enclosed by a substantial earthen bank and a fosse surrounded by traces of a low counterscarp bank. Original entrance not recognisable).
3. A medieval earthen ringfort in the southern end of Snugborough, (Site number 1113, page 137, Snugborough townland, in "Archaeological Inventory of County Cavan", Patrick O’Donovan, 1995, where it is described as- Crescent-shaped raised area (int. dims. 45.5m NW-SE; c. 35m NE-SW) enclosed from NW-N-SE by a substantial earthen bank and a wide, shallow fosse. Elsewhere the site is defined by a sheer cliff-face. Break in bank at NW with accompanying causeway represents original entrance.). In the Dúchas School's Collection, a story by Mr J. Murray of Snugborough in 1938 relates to this fort.
4. Hillview House
