= Cullyleenan =

Townland in County Cavan, Ireland

Coordinates: 54.1117°N 7.5819°W

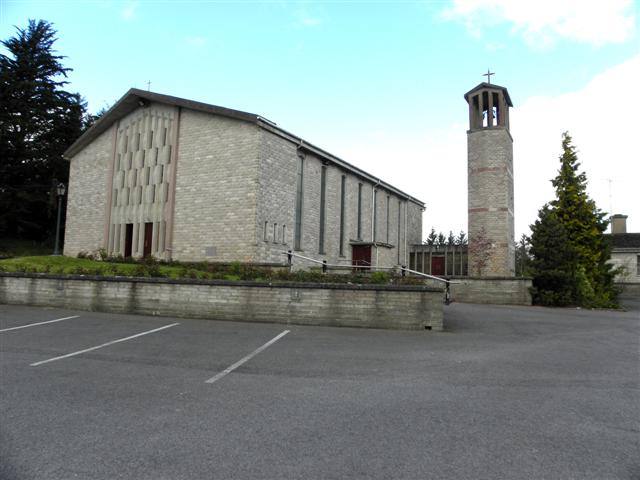
Our Lady of Lourdes RC Church, Ballyconnell, Cullyleenan townland, County Cavan, Ireland.

Cullyleenan (Irish: Coill Uí Lionáin, IPA: [ˌkəil̠ʲˈ iː ˈl̠ʲɪnˠaːnʲ]) is a townland in the parish of Tomregan, in the historical barony of Tullyhaw, County Cavan, Ireland.

== Etymology ==
The townland name is an anglicisation of the Gaelic placename 'Coill Uí Lionáin' which means "O’Lenan’s Wood", which possibly belonged to a member of the Uí Lionán family who were a bardic family from County Fermanagh. Alternative meanings that have been suggested are 'Wood of the Fishing-bank' or Coill an Líonáin meaning 'The Wood of the Gorge'. The 1609 Ulster Plantation map spells the name as Colelenan. A 1610 grant spells it Cowlynan. A 1630 Inquisition spells it Cowlynan. The 1652 Commonwealth Survey spells it as Coolelenan and the 1659 Down Survey map spells it as Colelolan. A 1666 grant spells it Coolonenan alias Colelonan. William Petty's 1685 map spells it as Cololan. The 1790 Cavan Carvaghs list spells the name as Cullelinan.

Daisy Hill

The townland boundary shared with Annagh is known locally as 'Daisy Hill'. This name does not seem to appear in sources earlier than 1921. However there was a house there in 1920 called 'Daisy Villa' or Ville owned by John McElroy, the steward of the Ballyconnell estate, so it is likely the present name is a corruption of the house name, which then spread to the larger area.

== Geography ==
It is bounded on the north by Annagh townland, on the west by Derryginny townland, on the south by Agharaskilly townland and on the east by Mullaghduff townland. Its chief geographical features are the Shannon-Erne Waterway which flows north along its western boundary and a central drumlin hill which rises over 200 feet above sea level. Cullyleenan is traversed by Bridge Street, the N87 road (Ireland), the Agharaskilly road, the Chapel Road and by the disused Cavan & Leitrim Railway. The townland covers 62 statute acres, including two acres of water.

== History ==
The earliest surviving reference to the townland is in an account of the death of the Ulster hero Conall Cernach, who is killed c.1 AD when he attempts to cross the ford called Ath na Mianna over the Woodford River to the opposite townland of Derryginny.

In the Plantation of Ulster by grant dated 23 June 1610, along with other lands, King James VI and I granted one poll of Cowlynan to Hugh Culme, esquire, as part of the Manor of Calva. Culme then surrendered his interest in Cullyleenan to Walter Talbot of Ballyconnell. Walter Talbot died on 26 June 1625 at Ballyconnell and his son James Talbot succeeded to the Cullyleenan lands aged just 10 years. An Inquisition held in Cavan Town on 20 September 1630 stated that Walter Talbot's lands included one poll in Cowlynan. James Talbot married Helen Calvert, the daughter of George Calvert, 1st Baron Baltimore of Maryland, USA, in 1635 and had a son Colonel George Talbot who owned an estate in Cecil County, Maryland which he named Ballyconnell in honour of his native town in Cavan. George Talbot was appointed Surveyor-General of Maryland in 1683. In the aftermath of the Irish Rebellion of 1641, James Talbot's estate in Ballyconnell was confiscated in the Cromwellian Act for the Settlement of Ireland 1652 because he was a Catholic and he was granted an estate in 1655 at Castle Rubey, County Roscommon instead. He died in 1687.

By 1652 the Irish rebels in the Ballyconnell area had been defeated and the area was put under the control of the Cromwellian captain Thomas Gwyllym. He was a native of Glenavy, County Antrim where his father, Rev. Meredith Gwyllym, was vicar of the parishes of Glenavy, Camlin, Tullyrusk, Ballinderry & Magheragall from 1622 until sometime after 1634. Gwyllym's name first appears in the area as the owner of the Ballyconnell estate in the 1652 Commonwealth Survey, also as a Cavan Commissioner in the 1660 Hearth Money Ordinances and in the 1664 Hearth Money Rolls he has five hearths in Ballyconnell. After the restoration of King Charles II to the throne in 1660, James Talbot tried to have the Ballyconnell estate restored to him but a final grant was made to Thomas Gwyllym in August 1666, which included 66 acres-16 perches of profitable land and 252 acres-1 rood of unprofitable land in Coolonenan alias Colelonan. Thomas Gwyllym died in 1681 and his son Colonel Meredith Gwyllym inherited the Ballyconnell estate, including Cullyleenan. Colonel Meredith Gwyllym died in 1711 and the Ballyconnell estate passed to his eldest son, Meredith Gwyllym.

A deed dated 2 May 1724 by the aforesaid Meredith Gwyllym includes the townland as Coolonenan alias Colenonan.

The Gwyllym estate was sold for £8,000 in 1724 to Colonel Alexander Montgomery (1686–1729) of Convoy House, County Donegal, M.P. for Donegal Borough 1725 to 1727 & for Donegal County 1727 to 1729.

A lease dated 14 May 1728 by the aforesaid Alexander Montgomery included Colenonan alias Coolenan.

Montgomery died in 1729 and left the Ballyconnell estate to his nephew George Leslie, who then assumed the name of George Leslie Montgomery. George Leslie Montgomery was M.P. for Strabane, County Tyrone from 1765 to 1768 and for County Cavan from 1770 to 1787, when he died and left the Ballyconnell estate to his son George Montgomery, whose estate was administered by the Court of Chancery as he was a lunatic. George Montgomery died in 1841 and his estate went to his Enery cousins of Bawnboy. In 1856 they sold the estate to take advantage of its increased value owing to the opening of the Woodford Canal through the town in the same year. The estate was split up amongst different purchasers.

In the Fermanagh Poll of Electors 1788 there was one Cullyleenan resident, John Graham, who was entitled to vote as he owned land in Drumany Beg townland in Kinawley parish.

In the 1825 Registry of Freeholders for County Cavan there was one freeholder registered in Cullilenon- John Reilly. He was a Forty-shilling freeholders holding a lease for lives from his landlord, the Montgomery Estate. He also appears in the 1827 Tithe Books below.

The Tithe Applotment Books for 1827 list the following tithepayers in the townland- Keon, Grimes, Wynne, Clark, McLaughlin, Sturdy, Hanna, Donahy, Montgomery, Answell, Reilly, Brady, Sheridan, McGraugh, Benison, Gallagher, Murdy, Enery.

In 1829 a Sunday school was kept in the townland, funded by the Hibernian Sunday School Society.

The Ordnance Survey Name Books for 1836 give the following description of the townland- Coill Uí Lionáin, 'O'Lenen's wood'. South of Ballyconnell. Property of Montgomery. Rent £2 per arable acre. 10 acres of bog and 8 acres of pasture, the rest is arable land. It contains a bit of the town of Ballyconnell, the Roman Catholic church and several good roads.

The Cullyleenan Valuation Office books are available for 1840.

Griffith's Valuation of 1857 lists the landlords of the townland as Kane, Webb and Wilson and the tenants as Webb, McDermott, Donohoe, Rourke, Brady, Reilly, Maguire, McGaghran, Kelly, Flynn, Sullivan, Kane, Griffin, Roe, Gallaher, Roman Catholic Chapel, Gileese, Benson, Thompson and Wilson. Further information and a detailed map showing the location of each holding can be seen online.

In the Dúchas Folklore Collection, a story by Miss Yeates, The Courthouse, Ballyconnell in 1938 relates a ghost story that occurred on Daisy Hill in Cullyleenan.

== Census ==
Year	Population	Males	Females	Total Houses	Uninhabited
1841	220	105	115	40	2
1851	164	80	84	30	3
1861	90	43	47	21	1
1871	58	30	28	19	0
1881	65	26	39	18	1
1891	47	23	24	16	2

In the 1901 census of Ireland, there are thirteen families listed in the townland.

In the 1911 census of Ireland, there are fourteen families listed in the townland. The high population is because part of the town of Ballyconnell is situate in Cullyleenan.

== Antiquities ==
1. An early-medieval earthen ringfort (Site number 489, page 70, Cullyleenan townland, in "Archaeological Inventory of County Cavan", Patrick O’Donovan, 1995, where it is described as- Raised circular area (int. dims. 48m NW-SE; 46.1m NE-SW) enclosed by a substantial earthen bank and a wide, shallow fosse. Perimeter has been destroyed from N-NE where a modern dwelling abuts the site. Original entrance not recognisable.)
2. Our Lady of Lourdes R.C. Church (opened on 25 August 1968)Geograph:: Our Lady of Lourdes RC Church,... (C) Kenneth Allen,
3. Ballyconnell New School (opened September 1968),
4. The disused St.Brigid's Roman Catholic church and graveyard (erected in 1843 on the site of a Mass-house erected c.1780)Geograph:: RC Church at Mullaghduff (C) Kenneth Allen
5. The Roman Catholic Parochial House (erected c.1875)
6. The Interdenominational graveyard (opened in 1980's)
7. The former Railway Station (opened 24 October 1887, finally closed on 1 April 1959). Geograph:: Ballyconnell former railway station (C) Kenneth Allen,
8. Ballyconnell Bridge which was erected in the 1830s. Geograph:: Bridge across the Woodford canal (C) Kenneth Allen
9. The Cavan and Leitrim Railway Red Bridge (erected in 1887)
10. Two former buildings were the Star Plastics factory (opened in 1961) and Ballyconnell Creamery (opened 1902, closed 1947).
11. There was a Hedge School in the townland in 1826. The headmaster was a Protestant, James Clarke. It was described as a lime and stone building valued at £6. There were 68 pupils, 38 boys and 30 girls, of whom 39 were Roman Catholic, 29 were Church of Ireland and one Presbyterian.
