= Doon (Tomregan) =

Townland in Crossbane, County Cavan, Ireland

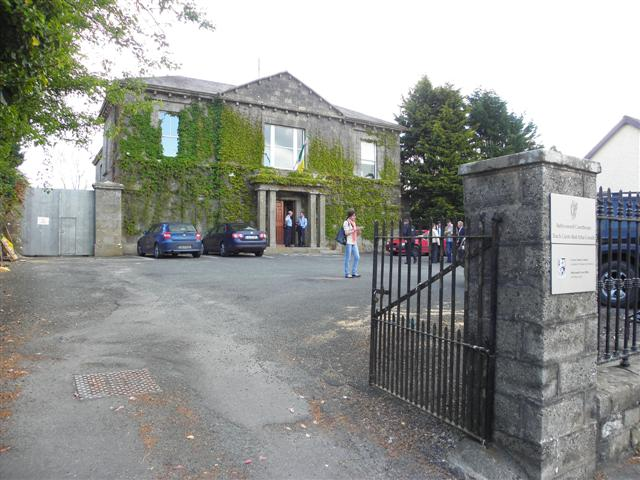
Ballyconnell Courthouse, Church Street, Doon townland, Ballyconnell, County Cavan, Ireland.

The townland of Doon (from Irish Dún meaning- The Fort) in the civil parish of Tomregan is in the electoral district of Ballyconnell. It is also situated in the barony of Tullyhaw.

== Geography ==
Doon is bounded on the north by Mucklagh and Rakeelan townlands, on the east by Annagh townland, on the south by Derryginny townland and on the west by Gortoorlan townland. Its chief geographical features are the Shannon-Erne Waterway, mountain streams and some drumlin hills reaching an altitude of 200 feet (61 m) above sea-level. The major part of Ballyconnell town is situated in Doon and the townland is traversed by the N87 road (Ireland), the R205 road (Ireland), the L1063 road, Church Street, Main Street, Bridge Street, Preaching House Lane, Mucklagh Lane and the Border Road. The townland covers 125 statute acres, including 4 acres (16,000 m^{2}) of water.

== Etymology ==
The 1609 Ulster Plantation Baronial map spells the name as Doone and a sub-division as Tennegh. A 1610 grant spells it as Downe and Eannagh. A 1630 Inquisition spells it as Downe and Enagh. The 1652 Commonwealth Survey spells the name as Doone (including the subdivision called Tennagh or Tionagh). The 1659 Down Survey map spells it as Downe. A 1666 grant spells it as Downe alias Gnogh. William Petty's 1685 map spells it as Downe. The 1790 Cavan Carvaghs list spells the name as Doon and Ennagh.

== History ==
In the Plantation of Ulster by grant dated 23 June 1610, along with other lands, King James VI and I granted one poll each in Downe and Eannagh to Hugh Culme, esquire, as part of the Manor of Calva. Culme then surrendered his interest in Doon to Walter Talbot of Ballyconnell. Walter Talbot died on 26 June 1625 at Ballyconnell and his son James Talbot succeeded to the Doon lands aged just 10 years. An Inquisition held in Cavan Town on 20 September 1630 stated that Walter Talbot's lands included one poll each in Downe and Enagh. James Talbot married Helen Calvert, the daughter of George Calvert, 1st Baron Baltimore of Maryland, USA, in 1635 and had a son Colonel George Talbot who owned an estate in Cecil County, Maryland which he named Ballyconnell in honour of his native town in Cavan. George Talbot was appointed Surveyor-General of Maryland in 1683. In the aftermath of the Irish Rebellion of 1641, James Talbot's estate in Ballyconnell was confiscated in the Cromwellian Act for the Settlement of Ireland 1652 because he was a Catholic and he was granted an estate in 1655 at Castle Rubey, County Roscommon instead. He died in 1687.

By 1652 the Irish rebels in the Ballyconnell area had been defeated and the area was put under the control of the Cromwellian captain Thomas Gwyllym. A 5lb iron cannonball from the period was found during construction of the Garda Barracks at the Fair Green in 1963. It is now in National Museum of Ireland. Thomas Gwyllym was a native of Glenavy, County Antrim where his father, Rev. Meredith Gwyllym, was vicar of the parishes of Glenavy, Camlin, Tullyrusk, Ballinderry & Magheragall from 1622 until sometime after 1634. Gwyllym's name first appears in the area as the owner of Doone in the 1652 Commonwealth Survey which lists the townland (including the subdivision called Tennagh or Tionagh) as belonging to 'Captain Gwilliams', with a tenant called Robert Worvell. Gwyllym was also a Cavan Commissioner in the 1660 Hearth Money Ordinances and in the 1664 Hearth Money Rolls he has five hearths in Ballyconnell. The only inhabitants of Ballyconnell who paid the Hearth Tax in the 1664 Hearth Money Rolls were Thomas Gwyllym, John Squire, Henry Jordan and Denis Alarne, but this would have included both Doon and Annagh townlands as Thomas Gwyllym was the owner of Ballyconnell Castle and lived in Annagh. After the restoration of King Charles II to the throne in 1660, James Talbot tried to have the Ballyconnell estate restored to him but a final grant was made to Thomas Gwyllym in August 1666, which included 79 acres-2 roods in Downe alias Gnogh. Thomas Gwyllym died in 1681 and his son Colonel Meredith Gwyllym inherited the Ballyconnell estate, including Doon. Colonel Meredith Gwyllym died in 1711 and the Ballyconnell estate passed to his eldest son, Meredith Gwyllym.

A deed dated 2 May 1724 by the aforesaid Meredith Gwyllym includes the townland as Down alias Enoch.

The Gwyllym estate was sold for £8,000 in 1724 to Colonel Alexander Montgomery (1686–1729) of Convoy House, County Donegal, M.P. for Donegal Borough 1725 to 1727 & for Donegal County 1727 to 1729.

A lease dated 14 May 1728 by the aforesaid Alexander Montgomery included Downe alias Enagh.

Montgomery died in 1729 and left the Ballyconnell estate to his nephew George Leslie, who then assumed the name of George Leslie Montgomery. George Leslie Montgomery was M.P. for Strabane, County Tyrone from 1765 to 1768 and for County Cavan from 1770 to 1787, when he died and left the Ballyconnell estate to his son George Montgomery, whose estate was administered by the Court of Chancery as he was a lunatic, and descended as part of the Ballyconnell estate since then. George Montgomery died in 1841 and his estate went to his Enery cousins of Bawnboy. In 1856 they sold the estate to take advantage of its increased value owing to the opening of the Woodford Canal through the town in the same year. The estate, including Doon, was split up among different purchasers and maps & details of previous leases of the sold parts are still available.

In the Cavan Poll Book of 1761, there were two people registered to vote in Doon in the Irish general election, 1761: John Lydle and John McLaughlin. They were each entitled to cast two votes. The four election candidates were Charles Coote, 1st Earl of Bellomont and Lord Newtownbutler (later Brinsley Butler, 2nd Earl of Lanesborough), both of whom were then elected Member of Parliament for Cavan County. The losing candidates were George Montgomery (MP) of Ballyconnell and Barry Maxwell, 1st Earl of Farnham. Absence from the poll book either meant a resident did not vote or, more likely, was not a freeholder entitled to vote, which would mean most of the inhabitants of Doon.

The Tithe Applotment Books for 1827 list forty-seven tithepayers in the townland.

In 1832 one person in Doon was registered as a keeper of weapons- Ralph Montgomery, who had one gun, one pistol and two swords.

The Ordnance Survey Name Books for 1836 give the following description of the townland- Dún, 'a fort'. Property of Montgomery. The town of Ballyconnell sits in this townland. The town is held by leases of lives. A weekly market on Friday and a monthly fair is held on the first Monday of every month. There is a church and jail, and post office, a corn mill & bleach green.

The Doon Valuation Office Field books are available for 1840.

The 1841 census of Ireland gives a combined population of 671 for Doon and Ballyconnell, of which 333 were males and 338 were females, with 127 houses, of which 12 were uninhabited.

The 1851 census of Ireland gives a combined population of 667, a decrease of 4 on the 1841 figure, due to the intervening Irish Famine of 1845–47, of which 331 were males and 336 were females, with 119 houses, of which 7 were uninhabited. The decrease was minimal compared to other townlands, due to work being available in the town.

Griffith's Valuation of 1857 lists about 90 landlords and tenants for Doon and Ballyconnell.

In 1861 the population of the townland was 123, being 55 males and 68 females. There were thirty houses in the townland, of which two were uninhabited and one in the course of erection.

In 1871 the population of the townland and number of houses were included within the census figures for the town of Ballyconnell.

In 1881 the population of the townland and number of houses were included within the census figures for the town of Ballyconnell.

In 1891 the population of the townland was 65, being 28 males and 37 females. There were twenty houses in the townland, of which two were uninhabited.

In the 1901 census of Ireland, there are over a hundred families listed in the townland.

In the 1911 census of Ireland, there are over 100 families listed in the townland and in Ballyconnell.

== Antiquities ==
1. A double-court cairn erected c. 2,500 B.C. (Site number 31, page 7, Doon townland, in Archaeological Inventory of County Cavan, Patrick O'Donovan, 1995, where it is described as "Situated in rolling countryside just N of Ballyconnell. This is a dual court tomb set in a long cairn. It is somewhat overgrown by trees and bushes. Two galleries, set back to back, are both 9m long, and each is divided by jambs into three chambers. They are likely to have shared a backstone but this is lacking. Eleven stones remain along the combined N sides of the galleries and seven along the S sides. There is a single courtstone just beyond the southern entrance jamb of the SW gallery and another about 2.5m from the S side of the entrance to the NE gallery. (O'Reilly 1988, 575-8; Ó Nualláin 1989, 116 Cv. 41))"
2. A prehistoric ring-barrow erected c. 1,000 B.C. (Site number 107, page 22, Doon townland, in Archaeological Inventory of County Cavan, Patrick O'Donovan, 1995, where it is described as- "Not marked on any OS ed. Largely levelled. Remains comprise a low earthen mound (Diameter 1.55m; H 0.2m) enclosed by a low earthen bank (Width 1.35m) with internal fosse (Wth 1.35m). Situated c.75m NE of a court tomb (31)")
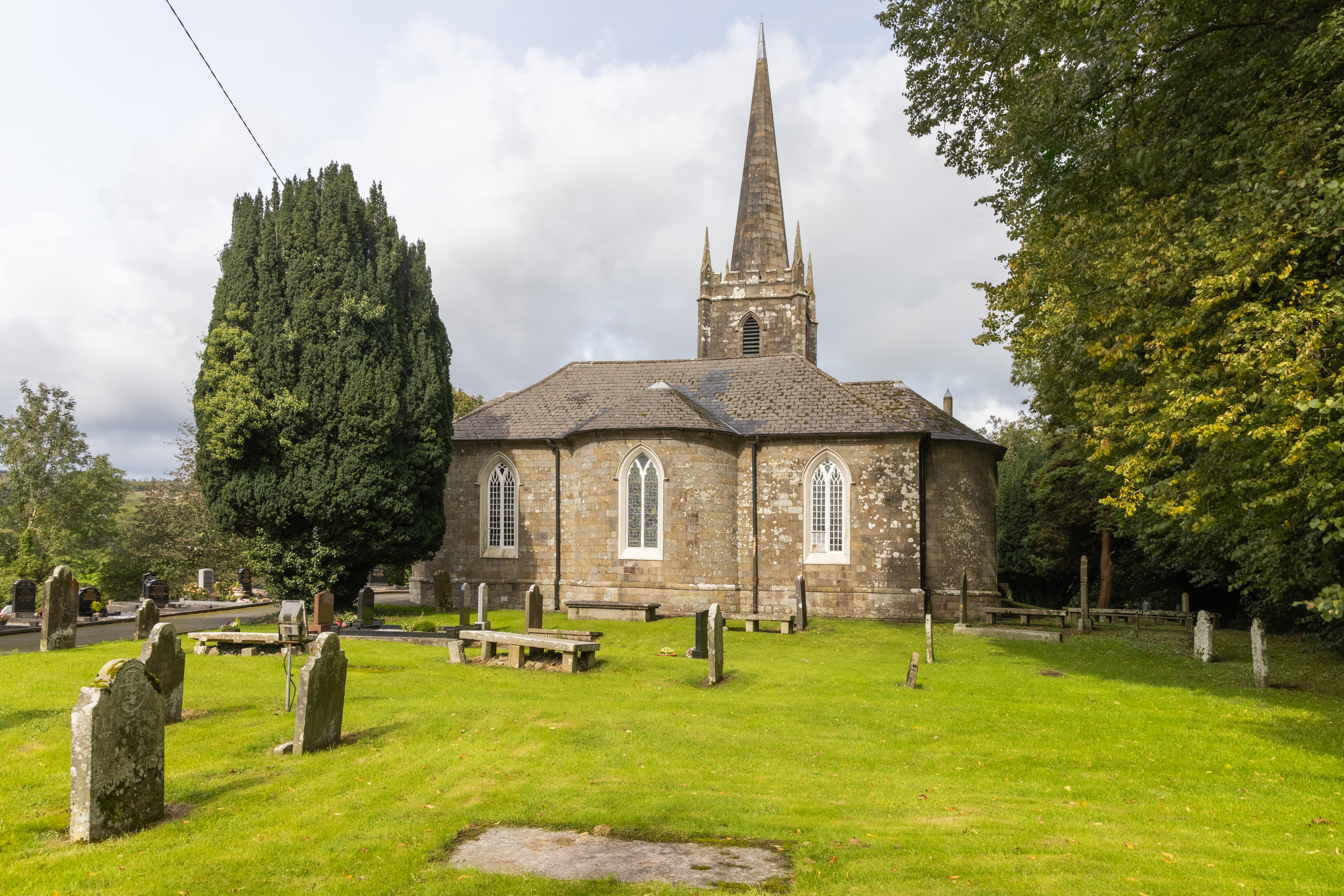
3. Tomregan Church
  Tomregan Anglican Church & Graveyard (erected in 1756 on the site of an older church built in the 16th century) Geograph:: Ballyconnell Parish Church (Church of... © Eric Jones cc-by-sa/2.0 Geograph:: Ballyconnell Church of Ireland © Kenneth Allen
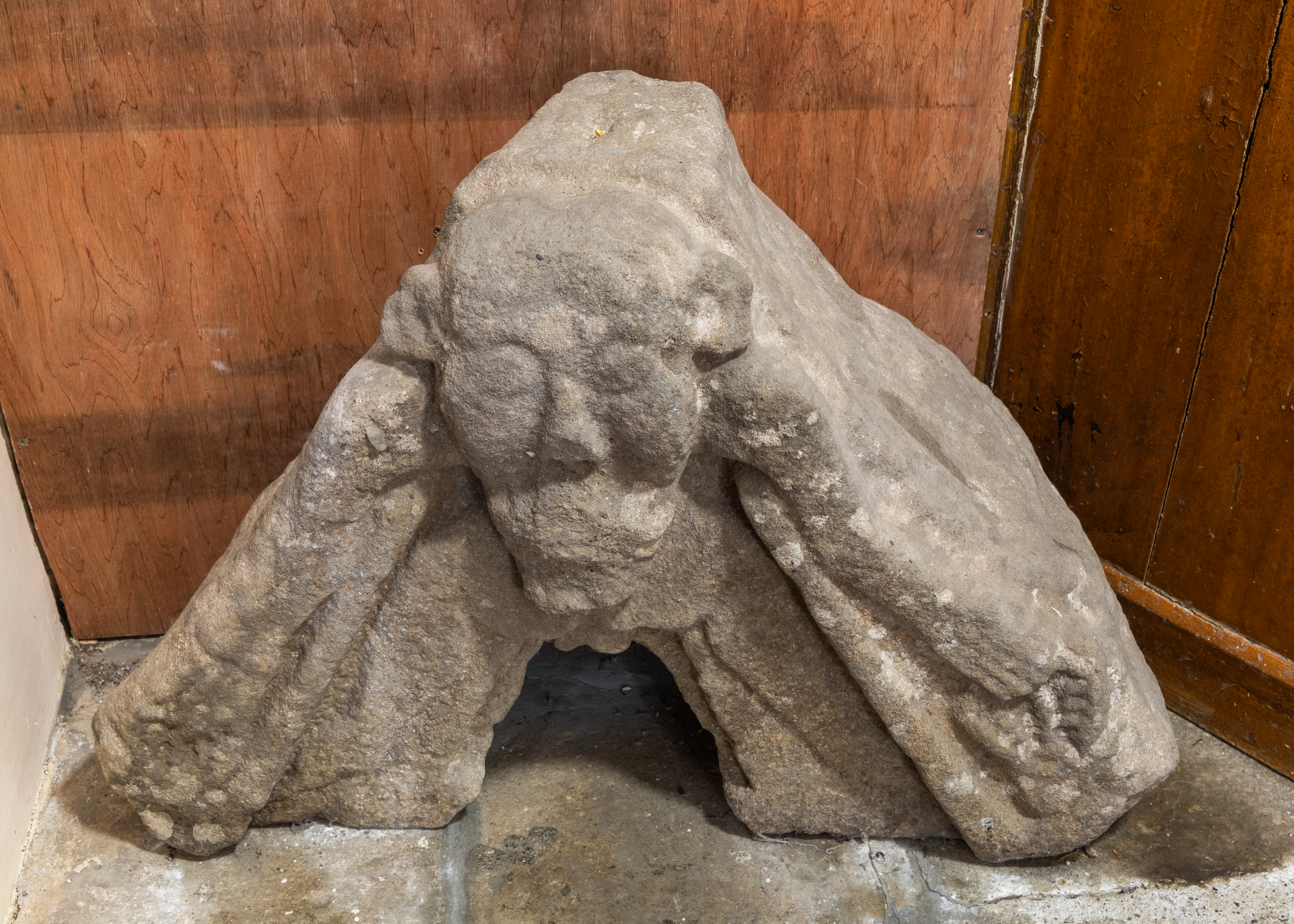
4. Tomregan Stone
  The "Tomregan Stone" Romanesque sculpture, carved c. 1150 A.D. (Site number 1641, page 195, Doon townland, in Archaeological Inventory of County Cavan, Patrick O'Donovan, 1995, where it is described as "Now situated inside the Church of Ireland chapel in Ballyconnell village but originally found in the townland of Mullynagolman (CV010-052002-). Large sandstone architectural fragment (H 0.2m; max Wth 0.33; D 0.3m) — possibly the apex of a doorway or tympanum, decorated with what appears to be an exhibitionist figure of unusual form. Figure comprises a long, oval, bearded face with staring eyes and high-set ears, no body, but wide splaying arms and legs, buttocks and possible representations of testicles. The left hand holds a small purse in the form of a human face, the right, a horseshoe-shaped object. Davies (1948, 116-7) believed that it originally surmounted the doorway of Mullynagolman round tower (CV014-052003-) — a theory refuted by Barrow (1979, 58) who-claimed it more likely came from the church at that site as the round tower doorway would have been too narrow to accommodate the large figure. According to a website on sheela-na-gig this figure was found by K.M. Dickie in 1961 near the monastic site of Tuaim Drecon (CV014-052----), a few kilometres south of Ballyconnell, where church ruins (CV014-052001-) and a round tower (CV014-052003-) are no longer visible. This carving which is now located inside the doorway of the Church of Ireland chapel at Ballyconnell was described by Freitag as a, 'carving on arch-stone; long head with prominent ears, ovoid eyes with eyeballs, lower part of face mutilated. Figure with arms and legs, but no body. Sagging, apple-shaped genitalia indicated between widely splayed legs. Both hands hold and identical unidentifiable object' (Freitag 2004, 143).)"
5. Ballyconnell Courthouse (erected in 1833)Geograph:: Courthouse, Ballyconnell © Kenneth Allen cc-by-sa/2.0
6. Ballyconnell Methodist Chapel (erected in 1869)Geograph:: Methodist Church, Ballyconnell © Kenneth Allen cc-by-sa/2.0
7. Ballyconnell Market House (erected in 1838)Geograph:: Market House, Ballyconnell © Kenneth Allen
8. Ballyconnell Mill (erected c. 1720)
9. Ballyconnell Presbyterian Church (erected c.1935, now converted to a library)
