= Gortoorlan =

Townland in County Cavan, Ireland

Gortoorlan is a townland in the Parish of Tomregan, Barony of Tullyhaw, County Cavan, Ireland.

== Etymology ==
The townland name is an anglicisation of the Gaelic placename "Gort Urlainn" which means 'The Field of the Spear-Shaft'. An alternative meaning which has been suggested is 'Field of the Forecourt'. The oldest surviving mention of the name is in the Fiants of Queen Elizabeth I (4813) dated 19 January 1586 where it is spelled Gortoulleran. The 1609 Ulster Plantation Baronial map spells the name as Gortooleran. A 1610 grant spells it Gortolleran. A 1630 Inquisition spells it Gortulleran. The 1652 Commonwealth Survey spells it as Gortoorlane. The 1659 Down Survey map spells it as Gortourlan. The 1663 Hearth Money Rolls spell it as Gartorlan. A 1666 grant spells it Gortourlan alias Gorteleran. The 1790 Cavan Carvaghs list spells the name as Gorturlan. Ambrose Leet's 1814 Directory spells the name as Gort-orlan.

== Geography ==
It is bounded on the north and east by Mucklagh townland, on the south by Doon (Tomregan) and Derryginny townlands and on the west by Snugborough townland. Its chief geographical features are some mountain streams, a pond on its border with Snugborough and Slieve Rushen mountain, on whose southern slope it lies, reaching an altitude of 900 feet above sea-level. Gortoorlan is traversed by the N87 road (Ireland) and Preaching House Lane. The townland covers 210 statute acres.

== History ==
The owner of the townland in 1586 was Tirlagh McGovern, son of Cormack McGovern and grandson of Edmund McGovern, who received a pardon in the Fiants of Queen Elizabeth I (4813) dated 19 January 1586.

In the Plantation of Ulster by grant dated 23 June 1610, along with other lands, King James VI and I granted one poll of Gortolleran to Hugh Culme, esquire, as part of the Manor of Calva. Culme then surrendered his interest in Snugborough to Walter Talbot of Ballyconnell. Walter Talbot died on 26 June 1625 at Ballyconnell and his son James Talbot succeeded to the Gortoorlan lands aged just 10 years. An Inquisition held in Cavan Town on 20 September 1630 stated that Walter Talbot's lands included one poll in Gortulleran. James Talbot married Helen Calvert, the daughter of George Calvert, 1st Baron Baltimore of Maryland, USA, in 1635 and had a son Colonel George Talbot who owned an estate in Cecil County, Maryland which he named Ballyconnell in honour of his native town in Cavan. George Talbot was appointed Surveyor-General of Maryland in 1683. In the aftermath of the Irish Rebellion of 1641, James Talbot's estate in Ballyconnell was confiscated in the Cromwellian Act for the Settlement of Ireland 1652 because he was a Catholic and he was granted an estate in 1655 at Castle Rubey, County Roscommon instead. He died in 1687.

By 1652 the Irish rebels in the Ballyconnell area had been defeated and the area was put under the control of the Cromwellian captain Thomas Gwyllym. He was a native of Glenavy, County Antrim where his father, Rev. Meredith Gwyllym, was vicar of the parishes of Glenavy, Camlin, Tullyrusk, Ballinderry & Magheragall from 1622 until sometime after 1634. Gwyllym's name first appears in the area as the owner of the Ballyconnell estate in the 1652 Commonwealth Survey, also as a Cavan Commissioner in the 1660 Hearth Money Ordinances and in the 1664 Hearth Money Rolls he has five hearths in Ballyconnell. In the Hearth Money Rolls compiled on 29 September 1663, there were three Hearth Tax payers in Gartorlan - James Dix (who had two hearths, indicating a larger house than normal), Christopher Hopson and Knoghor McConor, both of whom had one hearth. After the restoration of King Charles II to the throne in 1660, James Talbot tried to have the Ballyconnell estate restored to him but a final grant was made to Thomas Gwyllym in August 1666, which included 126 acres-16 perches in Gortourlan alias Gorteleran. Thomas Gwyllym died in 1681 and his son Colonel Meredith Gwyllym inherited the Ballyconnell estate, including Gortoorlan. Colonel Meredith Gwyllym died in 1711 and the Ballyconnell estate passed to his eldest son, Meredith Gwyllym.

A deed dated 2 May 1724 by the aforesaid Meredith Gwyllym includes the townland as Gortourlan alias Gorteleran.

The Gwyllym estate was sold for £8,000 in 1724 to Colonel Alexander Montgomery (1686–1729) of Convoy House, County Donegal, M.P. for Donegal Borough 1725 to 1727 & for Donegal County 1727 to 1729.

A lease dated 14 May 1728 by the aforesaid Alexander Montgomery included Gortourlan alias Gorteleran.

Montgomery died in 1729 and left the Ballyconnell estate to his nephew George Leslie, who then assumed the name of George Leslie Montgomery. George Leslie Montgomery was M.P. for Strabane, County Tyrone from 1765 to 1768 and for County Cavan from 1770 to 1787, when he died and left the Ballyconnell estate to his son George Montgomery, whose estate was administered by the Court of Chancery as he was a lunatic, and descended as part of the Ballyconnell estate since then. George Montgomery died in 1841 and his estate went to his Enery cousins of Bawnboy. In 1856 they sold the estate to take advantage of its increased value owing to the opening of the Woodford Canal through the town in the same year. The estate, including Gortoorlan, was split up among different purchasers and maps & details of previous leases of the sold parts are still available.

The Tithe Applotment Books for 1827 list the following tithepayers in the townland- Sturdy, Kelly, Lawrence, Donahy

The Ordnance Survey Name Books for 1836 give the following description of the townland- Gort úrlainn, 'field of the shaft'. North-east of parish. Property of Montgomery. Rent 16 shillings to £1 per arable acre. 50 acres of mountain. Soil gravelly on limestone. No road. Produces oats, flax and potatoes. Poor farmers. A fort towards the south.

The Gortoorlan Valuation Office Field books are available for February 1840.

Griffith's Valuation of 1857 lists the landlords of the townland as the Annesley Estate and Netterfield & the tenants as Montgomery, Donohoe, Griffin, Kelly, Cochrane, McKenna, Bradshaw, Faris, McCaffrey, McNally, Armstrong and Kane.

== Census ==
| Year | Population | Males | Females | Total Houses | Uninhabited |
|---|---|---|---|---|---|
| 1841 | 70 | 30 | 40 | 11 | 1 |
| 1851 | 46 | 23 | 23 | 8 | 0 |
| 1861 | 42 | 21 | 21 | 9 | 0 |
| 1871 | 28 | 17 | 11 | 7 | 0 |
| 1881 | 24 | 16 | 8 | 4 | 0 |
| 1891 | 24 | 15 | 9 | 5 | 0 |

In the 1901 census of Ireland, there are four families listed in the townland.

In the 1911 census of Ireland, there are five families listed in the townland.

== Antiquities ==
1. The remains of an earthen enclosure, probably a ringfort, in the south of the townland (Site number 1375, page 164, Gortoorlan townland, "Archaeological Inventory of County Cavan", Patrick O’Donovan, 1995, where it is described as- Marked 'Fort' on OS 1836 and 1876 eds. Situated close to the foot of a mountain. Not visible at ground level).
2. An unrecorded mound on Preaching-House Lane to the north of O’Brien's house, which may be a covered cairn or passage-tomb.
