= Mullaghduff, County Cavan =

Townland in County Cavan, Ireland

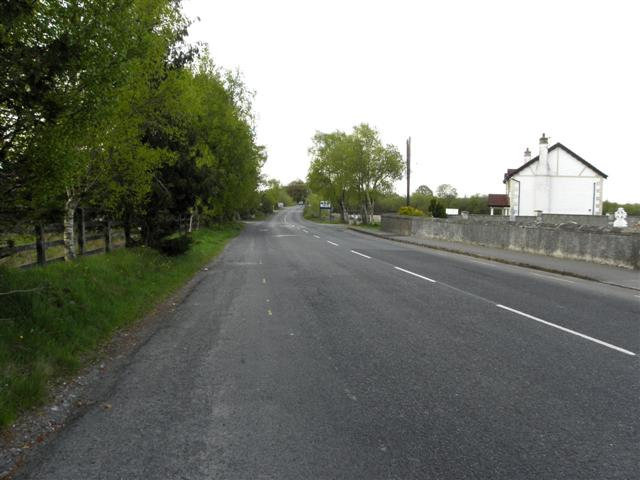
Road at Mullaghduff, heading south-east

Mullaghduff (Irish: Mullach Dubh) is a townland in County Cavan, Ireland. It is in the civil parish of Tomregan, in the barony of Tullyhaw.

== Etymology ==
The townland name is an anglicisation of the Irish placename Mullach Dubh which means 'the black hilltop', probably for the blackish soil which covers the hill. The 1609 Ulster Plantation baronial map spells the name as Mulladuff. A 1610 grant spells the name as Mullaghduffe. A 1630 Inquisition spells it as Mullaghduffe. The 1641 Rebellion Depositions as Mullaighduffe, the 1652 Commonwealth Survey as Mullaghduffe and the 1659 Down Survey map spells it as Mullaghduffe. A 1666 grant spells it as Mullaghduffe. William Petty's 1685 map spells it as Mulladuf.

== Geography ==
It is bounded on the north by Annagh and Corranierna townlands, on the west by Cullyleenan and Agharaskilly townlands, on the south by Cavanagh and on the east by Cranaghan and Killywilly townlands. Its chief geographical features are Killywilly Lough on its eastern boundary and a central drumlin hill which rises to 309 feet above sea level. Mullaghduff is traversed by the N87 road; the local L1505 road (known locally as the Yellow Road, so called because it was originally surfaced with yellow gravel and sandstone); Murray's Lane; and by the disused Cavan and Leitrim Railway. The townland covers 253 statute acres, including three acres of water.

== History ==
Until the beginning of the 19th century, the present day townland of Corranierna formed part of Mullaghduff.

In the Plantation of Ulster by grant dated 23 June 1610, along with other lands, King James VI and I granted two polls in Mullaghduffe and one poll of Cloghane to Hugh Culme, esquire, as part of the Manor of Calva. Cloghane in Irish is Clochán, which can mean either 'A circular stone house' or "A stony ford, a row of stepping stones in a ford". Culme then surrendered his interest in Mullaghduff to Walter Talbot of Ballyconnell. Walter Talbot died on 26 June 1625 at Ballyconnell and his son James Talbot succeeded to the Mullaghduff lands aged just 10 years. An Inquisition held in Cavan Town on 20 September 1630 stated that Walter Talbot's lands included two polls in Mullaghduffe and one poll in Cloughan. James Talbot married Helen Calvert, the daughter of George Calvert, 1st Baron Baltimore of the Province of Maryland, in 1635 and had a son Colonel George Talbot who owned an estate in Cecil County, Maryland which he named Ballyconnell in honour of his native town in County Cavan. George Talbot was appointed Surveyor-General of Maryland in 1683. In the aftermath of the Irish Rebellion of 1641, James Talbot's estate in Ballyconnell was confiscated in the Cromwellian Act for the Settlement of Ireland 1652 because he was a Catholic and he was granted an estate in 1655 at Castle Rubey, County Roscommon instead. He died in 1687.

By 1652 the Irish rebels in the Ballyconnell area had been defeated and the area was put under the control of the Cromwellian captain Thomas Gwyllym. He was a native of Glenavy, County Antrim where his father, Rev. Meredith Gwyllym, was vicar of the parishes of Glenavy, Camlin, Tullyrusk, Ballinderry and Magheragall from 1622 until sometime after 1634. Gwyllym's name first appears in the area as the owner in the 1652 Commonwealth Survey, which lists the townland (spelled Mullaghduffe and Clioghan) as belonging to 'Captain Gwilliams'. Gwyllym was also a Cavan Commissioner in the 1660 Hearth Money Ordinances and in the 1664 Hearth Money Rolls he has five hearths in Ballyconnell. After the restoration of King Charles II to the throne in 1660, James Talbot tried to have the Ballyconnell estate restored to him but a final grant was made to Thomas Gwyllym in August 1666, which included 210 acres of profitable land and 10 acres-2 roods of unprofitable land in Mullaghduffe alias Cloghane alias Cormerin. Thomas Gwyllym died in 1681 and his son Colonel Meredith Gwyllym inherited the Ballyconnell estate, including Mullaghduff. Colonel Meredith Gwyllym died in 1711 and the Ballyconnell estate passed to his eldest son, Meredith Gwyllym.

A deed dated 2 May 1724 by the aforesaid Meredith Gwyllym includes the townland as Mullaghduffe alias Cloghane alias Cormerin.

The Gwyllym estate was sold for £8,000 in 1724 to Colonel Alexander Montgomery of Convoy House, County Donegal, M.P. for Donegal Borough 1725 to 1727 and for Donegal County 1727 to 1729.

A lease dated 14 May 1728 by the aforesaid Alexander Montgomery included Mullaghduffe alias Cortmerin.

Montgomery died in 1729 and left the Ballyconnell estate to his nephew George Leslie, who then assumed the name of George Leslie Montgomery. George Leslie Montgomery was M.P. for Strabane, County Tyrone from 1765 to 1768 and for County Cavan from 1770 to 1787, when he died and left the Ballyconnell estate to his son George Montgomery, whose estate was administered by the Court of Chancery as he was a lunatic. and descended as part of the Ballyconnell estate since then. George Montgomery died in 1841 and his estate went to his Enery cousins of Bawnboy. In 1856 they sold the estate to take advantage of its increased value owing to the opening of the Woodford Canal through the town in the same year. The estate, including Mullaghduff, was split up among different purchasers and maps and details of previous leases of the sold parts are still available.

Four deeds relating to land transactions in Mullaghduff in 1749 are now in the Farnham Papers held in the National Library of Ireland (Collection List No. 95). They are described as-

Lease for one year from Robert King to William Lennox of Mullaghduff in the barony of Tullyhaw and Ardarragh and other lands in the barony of Tullyhunco. 1749 Mar. 5

Conveyance of mortgage from Robert King to William Lennox secured by Mullaghduff in the barony of Tullyhaw and Ardarragh and other lands in the barony of Tullyhunco. 1749 Mar. 6.

Lease for one year from Mrs. Mary Carmichael to Robert King of Mullaghduff in the barony of Tullyhaw and Ardarragh and other lands in the barony of Tullyhunco. 1749 May 1.

Mortgage between Mrs. Mary Carmichael and Robert King secured by Mullaghduff in the barony of Tullyhaw and Ardarragh and other lands in the barony of Tullyhunco in consideration of the sum of £400. 1749 May 2.

In the Cavan Poll Book of 1761, there were five people registered to vote in Mullaghduff in the Irish general election, 1761: William Armstrong, Joseph Benison, Robert Neill, Joseph Trimble and William Trimble. They were each entitled to cast two votes. The four election candidates were Charles Coote, 1st Earl of Bellomont and Lord Newtownbutler (later Brinsley Butler, 2nd Earl of Lanesborough), both of whom were then elected Member of Parliament for Cavan County. The losing candidates were George Montgomery (MP) of Ballyconnell and Barry Maxwell, 1st Earl of Farnham. Absence from the poll book either meant a resident did not vote or, more likely, was not a freeholder entitled to vote, which would mean most of the inhabitants of Mullaghduff.

The 1790 Cavan Carvaghs list spells the name as Mullagh and Cloghan.

Ambrose Leet's 1814 Directory spells the name as Mullagh-duff.

The Tithe Applotment Books for 1827 list the following tithepayers in the townland- Moore, Gallagher, Whitely, Sturdy, Sheridan, Taylor, Quinn, Reilly, Graham, Gerty, Watt, Baxter, Matthews, O'Brien.

The Ordnance Survey Name Books for 1836 give the following description of the townland- Mullach Dubh which means Black Summit. This was in old times considered a part of Cavans & in patent called Cavan Mullaghduff. Property of Montgomery. Rent from 14 shillings to £1 per arable acre. Gravelly soil. Stone houses. Crops are oats, rye, flax and potatoes. Road in good repair. Inhabitants are comfortable.

The Mullaghduff Valuation Office books are available for 1840.

Griffith's Valuation of 1857 lists the landlord of the townland as Netterfield and the tenants as Cochrane, Quinn, Fallon, Moore, Faris, McGinn, Reilly, Graham, Gallahar and Roe.

== Census ==
Year	Population	Males	Females	Total Houses	Uninhabited
1841	87	44	43	18	0
1851	54	26	28	9	0
1861	40	17	23	9	1
1871	27	15	12	7	0
1881	31	20	11	5	0
1891	22	12	10	4	0

In the 1901 census of Ireland, there are six families listed in the townland.

In the 1911 census of Ireland, there were seven families in the townland.

== Antiquities ==
The only items of historical interest are the disused Cavan and Leitrim Railway and a sandpit.
