= Henry Pomeroy, 2nd Viscount Harberton =

Irish politician

Henry Pomeroy, 2nd Viscount Harberton (8 December 1749 – 29 November 1829) was an Anglo-Irish politician.

He was the son of Arthur Pomeroy, 1st Viscount Harberton, and his wife Mary Colley, daughter of Henry Colley of Carbury Castle, and Lady Mary Hamilton. He served in the Irish House of Commons as Member of Parliament for Strabane from 1776 until 1797. He was called to the Irish Bar in 1775. On 9 April 1798, he succeeded to his father's title as Viscount Harberton and assumed his seat in the Irish House of Lords.

He married Mary Grady, and had one son, Henry, who died young. On his death, his title passed to his brother Arthur.

Parliament of Ireland
Preceded by Claude Hamilton; John Stuart Hamilton	Member of Parliament for Strabane; 1776–1797; With: John Stuart Hamilton	Succeeded by Nathaniel Montgomery-Moore; John Stewart
Peerage of Ireland
Preceded by Arthur Pomeroy	Viscount Harberton; 1798–1829	Succeeded by Arthur Pomeroy
