= Annagh, County Cavan =

Annagh
- Townland
- Location within Ireland
- Coordinates: 54°07′13″N 07°33′50″W
- Country: Ireland
- County: County Cavan
- Barony: Tullyhaw
- Civil parish: Tomregan

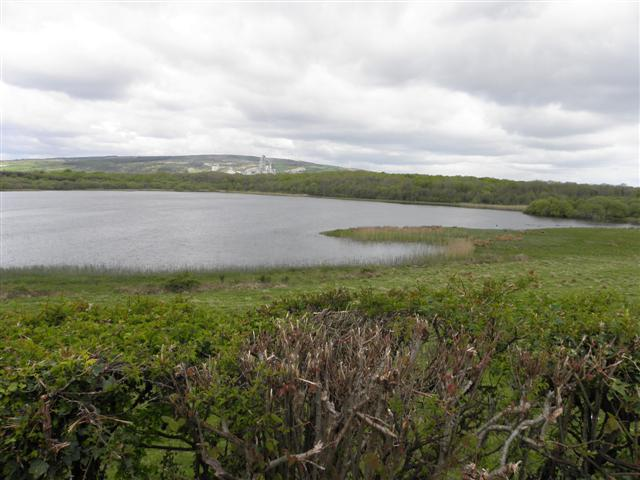
Annagh Lough, Annagh townland, Tomregan, County Cavan, Ireland, looking WNW.

Annagh is a townland in the Parish of Tomregan, Barony of Tullyhaw, County Cavan, Ireland.

== Etymology ==
On the 1609 Ulster Plantation Baronial map it is split into two townlands named Shannaontra and Shannaititr. In a 1610 grant they are spelled Tanaghyeightra and Tanaghwotra. In an Inquisition dated 20 September 1630 the two townlands were spelled Townaeiateragh and Tawnaowteragh. In the 1652 Commonwealth Survey the spelling was Tenaghoghtragh and Tenaghightragh. On the Down Survey map of 1655 these townlands were merged into one and it is named Annagh. A 1666 grant spells the names as Anagh alias Tannaghyeitragh alias Tannaghowoteragh. William Petty's 1685 map spells it as An. The usual meaning suggested for the place name is that Annagh is an anglicisation of the Irish language placename "Eanach" which means 'A moor or marsh'. However it is more likely that Annagh is an abbreviation of 'Tannagh' (meaning a pasture) as the older names of the place in Irish were 'Tamnach Íochtar' & "Tamnach Uachtar" which mean 'Lower Pasture' and "Upper Pasture".

== Geography ==
Annagh is one of four townlands over which the town of Ballyconnell extends. It is bounded on the north by the international border with Fermanagh and Northern Ireland, on the east by Cuillaghan, Killywilly, Corranierna and Mullaghduff townlands, on the south by Cullyleenan townland and on the west by Doon (Tomregan), Rakeelan and Gortawee townlands. Its chief geographical features are Annagh Lough, the Dhoogue stream, Scotchtown Island, Monkey's Island, a chalybeate well, Bray Wood, some drumlin hills reaching an altitude of 200 feet (61 m) above sea-level and the Shannon-Erne Waterway which flows north along the western boundary of the townland. Bray Wood is the finest and most extensive area of woodland along the Shannon-Erne Waterway, consisting principally of Ash (Fraxinus) and Hazel together with Oak, Elm and Rowan trees. The undergrowth consists of Holly, Blackthorn (Prunus spinosa) and Bramble, with a rich ground flora. Scotchtown Island has a wet woodland flora, dominated by Alder and Weeping Willow (Salex spp). The original non-canalised Woodford River Channel on the boundary with Cloncoohy contains rich wetland floras. Annagh is traversed by Bridge Street, Daisy Hill, the N87 road (Ireland), the L1063 road and some demesne lanes. The townland covers 419 statute acres, including 33 acres (130,000 m^{2}) of water.

== History ==
In the Plantation of Ulster by grant dated 23 June 1610, along with other lands, King James VI and I granted one poll each in Tanaghyeightra and Tanaghwotra to Hugh Culme, esquire, as part of the Manor of Calva. Culme then surrendered his interest in Annagh to Walter Talbot of Ballyconnell. Walter Talbot died on 26 June 1625 at Ballyconnell and his son James Talbot succeeded to the Annagh lands aged just 10 years. An Inquisition held in Cavan Town on 20 September 1630 stated that Walter Talbot's lands included one poll each in Townaeiateragh and Tawnaowteragh. James Talbot married Helen Calvert, the daughter of George Calvert, 1st Baron Baltimore of Maryland, USA, in 1635 and had a son Colonel George Talbot who owned an estate in Cecil County, Maryland which he named Ballyconnell in honour of his native town in Cavan. George Talbot was appointed Surveyor-General of Maryland in 1683. In the aftermath of the Irish Rebellion of 1641, James Talbot's estate in Ballyconnell was confiscated in the Cromwellian Act for the Settlement of Ireland 1652 because he was a Catholic and he was granted an estate in 1655 at Castle Rubey, County Roscommon instead. He died in 1687.

By 1652 the Irish rebels in the Ballyconnell area had been defeated and the area was put under the control of the Cromwellian captain Thomas Gwyllym. He was a native of Glenavy, County Antrim where his father, Rev. Meredith Gwyllym, was vicar of the parishes of Glenavy, Camlin, Tullyrusk, Ballinderry & Magheragall from 1622 until sometime after 1634. Gwyllym's name first appears in the area as the owner of Tenaghoghtragh and Tenaghightragh in the 1652 Commonwealth Survey which lists the townland as belonging to 'Captain Gwilliams'. Gwyllym was also a Cavan Commissioner in the 1660 Hearth Money Ordinances and in the 1664 Hearth Money Rolls he has five hearths in Ballyconnell. The only inhabitants of Ballyconnell who paid the Hearth Tax in the 1664 Hearth Money Rolls were Thomas Gwyllym, John Squire, Henry Jordan and Denis Alarne, but this would have included both Doon and Annagh townlands as Thomas Gwyllym was the owner of Ballyconnell Castle and lived in Annagh. After the restoration of King Charles II to the throne in 1660, James Talbot tried to have the Ballyconnell estate restored to him but a final grant was made to Thomas Gwyllym in August 1666, which included 164 acres-1 rood-8 perches in Anagh alias Tannaghyeitragh alias Tannaghowoteragh. Thomas Gwyllym died in 1681 and his son Colonel Meredith Gwyllym inherited the Ballyconnell estate, including Annagh. Colonel Meredith Gwyllym died in 1711 and the Ballyconnell estate passed to his eldest son, Meredith Gwyllym.

A deed dated 2 May 1724 by the aforesaid Meredith Gwyllym includes the townland as Anagh alias Tannaghyeitragh alias Tannaghowoteragh.

The Gwyllym estate was sold for £8,000 in 1724 to Colonel Alexander Montgomery (1686–1729) of Convoy House, County Donegal, M.P. for Donegal Borough 1725 to 1727 & for Donegal County 1727 to 1729.

A lease dated 14 May 1728 by the aforesaid Alexander Montgomery included Anagh alias Tanaghiatragh alias Tanaghowatragh.

Montgomery died in 1729 and left the Ballyconnell estate to his nephew George Leslie, who then assumed the name of George Leslie Montgomery. George Leslie Montgomery was M.P. for Strabane, County Tyrone from 1765 to 1768 and for County Cavan from 1770 to 1787, when he died and left the Ballyconnell estate to his son George Montgomery, whose estate was administered by the Court of Chancery as he was a lunatic. George Montgomery died in 1841 and his estate went to his Enery cousins of Bawnboy. In 1856 they sold the estate to take advantage of its increased value owing to the opening of the Woodford Canal through the town in the same year. The estate was split up amongst different purchasers.

The 1790 Cavan Carvaghs list spells the name as Aunaghs.

When the Ordnance Survey maps of 1836 were surveyed, the townland boundary between Annagh and Cullyleenan ran behind O'Grady's house. It was later shifted south-westward in later O.S. editions to run along the middle of the main road. So the Tithe Applotment Books for 1827 for Cullyleenan probably list some Annagh tithepayers like Montgomery and Enery.

The Annagh Valuation Office Field books are available for 1840–1841.

Griffith's Valuation of 1857 lists only one landholder in Annagh, Dr. George Roe, the owner of Ballyconnell House.

== Census ==
Year	Population	Males	Females	Total Houses	Uninhabited
1841	25	9	16	3	0
1851	31	12	19	4	0
1861	22	10	12	3	0
1871	21	9	12	3	0
1881	12	5	7	2	0
1891	12	5	7	3	1

In the 1901 census of Ireland, there are eight families listed in the townland.

In the 1911 census of Ireland, there are eight families listed in the townland.

== Antiquities ==
1. A medieval crannóg in Annagh Lough (Site number 1469, page 175, Annagh townland, in "Archaeological Inventory of County Cavan", Patrick O’Donovan, 1995, where it is described as- Small irregular-shaped island (max. dim. c. 30m) in Annagh Lough, c. 75m from the shoreline. Marked on all OS eds.)
2. Ballyconnell House with its Demesne & external buildings including a sweathouse (or possible limekiln) and gatehouses (Site number 1798, page 228, Annagh townland, in "Archaeological Inventory of County Cavan", Patrick O’Donovan, 1995). A castle was erected there between 1611 and 1619. Samuel Lewis states in his 1837 Topographical Dictionary of Ireland that the house was erected in 1764 by George Montgomery (MP) on the site of Ballyconnell Castle, which was entirely destroyed by an accidental fire. However, this statement is contradicted by Rev. William Henry's book Upper Lough Erne written in 1739, page 23 of which states 'Here on the south side of the river, defended by huge old trees, stands a beautiful new seat of the Rev. George Leslie. This seat is of hewn stone without, and elegantly finished with stucco work within. The front is diversified with dark and light-coloured stones, resembling a pavement: It looks to the west; and the river answers to it as a canal.' Ballyconnell Castle was burnt down in 1688 so either a new house was erected then and was burnt down in 1764 and another one erected on its site in 1764, or else Lewis gave an incorrect date and Ballyconnell House was erected at the end of the 17th century after the castle was burned in 1688.
