= Sir John Hamilton, 1st Baronet, of Dunamana =

Sir John Stuart Hamilton, 1st Baronet (circa 1740 – 1802) was an Anglo-Irish politician.

Hamilton was the Member of Parliament for Strabane in the Irish House of Commons between 1763 and 1797. On 1 February 1781 he was created a baronet, of Dunamana in the Baronetage of Ireland. He was succeeded in his title by his son, also called John.

Parliament of Ireland
Preceded by Robert Lowry; William Hamilton	Member of Parliament for Strabane; 1763-1797; With: Robert Lowry (1763-1765); George Leslie Montgomery (1765-1768); William Brownlow (1768-1769); Claude Hamilton (1769-1776); Hon. Henry Pomeroy (1776-1797)	Succeeded by Nathaniel Montgomery-Moore; John Stewart
Baronetage of Ireland
New creation	Baronet (of Dunamana); 1781-1802	Succeeded by John Hamilton
