= Sir John Stewart, 1st Baronet, of Athenree =

Irish lawyer and politician

Sir John Stewart, 1st Baronet (c.1758 – 22 June 1825) was an Irish lawyer and politician. He was a son of Church of Ireland clergyman, the Reverend Hugh Stewart, Rector of Termonmaguirk, County Tyrone and Sarah Hamilton, daughter of the Venerable Andrew Hamilton, who was Archdeacon of Raphoe for more than sixty years. He was educated in Drogheda and at Trinity College Dublin, studied law at Lincoln's Inn, and was called to the Irish Bar in 1781.

In 1794, he was elected to the Irish House of Commons for Augher. At the 1797 elections, he was elected for four constituencies: Askeaton, Bangor, Portarlington and Strabane. He chose to sit for Bangor, and held that seat until the dissolution of the Parliament of Ireland when the Act of Union came into effect in 1801. He was Solicitor-General for Ireland from 1798 to 1799 and Attorney-General for Ireland from 1799 to 1803. He was High Sheriff of County Tyrone in 1809.

After the Act of Union he was elected to the Parliament of the United Kingdom as Tory Member of Parliament (MP) for County Tyrone from 1802 to 1806 and 1812 until his death in 1825.

Stewart married in 1789, Mary, daughter of Mervyn Archdale of Castle Archdale, near Enniskillen, with whom he had two sons and a daughter.

Driving a two-horse carriage while suffering from long-term sickness, he was badly injured when his horses bolted and died four days later in June 1825. He was succeeded in the baronetcy by his elder son, Hugh.

Parliament of Ireland
Preceded by Thomas Coghlan; Edmond Stanley	Member of Parliament for Augher; 1794–1798; With: Edmond Stanley	Succeeded by William Bailey; James Galbraith
Preceded by Sir Joseph Hoare, 1st Bt; Henry Alexander	Member of Parliament for Askeaton; 1798; With: Sir Joseph Hoare, 1st Bt	Succeeded by Sir Joseph Hoare, 1st Bt; Sir Vere Hunt, 1st Bt
Preceded by Richard Cavendish; William Browne	Member of Parliament for Portarlington; 1798; With: Sir John Parnell, 2nd Bt	Succeeded by Frederick Trench; Thomas Stannus
Preceded by Sir John Hamilton, 1st Bt; Henry Pomeroy	Member of Parliament for Strabane; 1798; With: Nathaniel Montgomery-Moore	Succeeded by Nathaniel Montgomery-Moore; Andrew Knox
Preceded by Sir John Blackwood, 2nd Bt; John Keane	Member of Parliament for Bangor; 1798–1801; With: Hon. Robert Ward	Succeeded by Parliament of the United Kingdom
Parliament of the United Kingdom
Preceded by Viscount Corry; James Stewart	Member of Parliament for County Tyrone; 1802–1806; With: James Stewart	Succeeded by Thomas Knox (1); James Stewart
Preceded by Thomas Knox (1); James Stewart	Member of Parliament for County Tyrone; 1812–1825; With: Thomas Knox (2) to 1818; William Stewart from 1818	Succeeded by Henry Lowry-Corry; William Stewart
Legal offices
Preceded by John Toler	Solicitor-General for Ireland; 1798–1799	Succeeded by William Cusack-Smith
Preceded by John Toler	Attorney-General for Ireland; 1799–1803	Succeeded by William Plunket
Baronetage of the United Kingdom
New creation	Baronet (of Athenree); 1803–1825	Succeeded by Hugh Stewart
