= Corranierna =

Townland in County Cavan, Ireland

Coordinates: 54°6′52.7″N 7°33′38.8″W

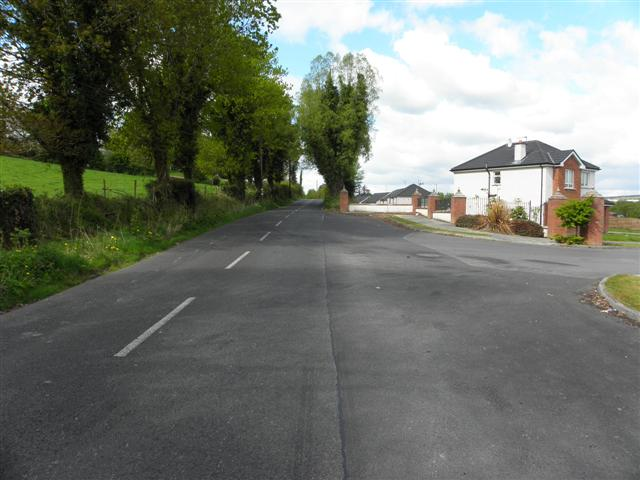
Amberwood, Corranierna townland, Tomregan, County Cavan, Ireland, looking west.

Corranierna is a townland in the Parish of Tomregan, Barony of Tullyhaw, County Cavan, Ireland.

== Etymology ==
The townland name is an anglicisation of either Cor an Iarna, meaning 'The Hill of the Skein (of thread)’, which derived its name from the weavers who lived there. In the 1938 Dúchas Folklore Collection there is an account of a flax mill in Corranierna. The local pronunciation however is 'Corr-Nern-Yah', which seems to indicate a different meaning: Cor na nAirchinneach, meaning 'The Hill of the Erenagh'. On the 1609 Ulster Plantation Baronial map it forms part of Mullaghduff townland. On the Down Survey map of 1655 it was still part of Mullaghduff. A 1666 grant includes it as Mullaghduffe alias Cloghane alias Cormerin. A deed dated 2 May 1724 includes the townland as Mullaghduffe alias Cloghane alias Cormerin. Corranierna remained as part of Mullaghduff until the beginning of the 19th century when the two townlands were separated.

== Geography ==
It is bounded on the north and west by Annagh townland, on the east by Killywilly townland and on the south by Mullaghduff townland. Its chief geographical features are Annagh Lough, Killywilly Lough, two chalybeate wells and some drumlin hills reaching an altitude of 234 feet (71 m) above sea-level. The townland is traversed by the local L1505 road (known locally as the Yellow Road, so called because it was originally surfaced with yellow gravel and sandstone), Killywilly Lane, some minor lanes and the disused Cavan and Leitrim Railway. Corranierna covers an area of 180 statute acres, including 26 acres (110,000 m^{2}) of water.

== History ==
As it formed part of Mullaghduff, its history is the same as that townland until the beginning of the 19th century, when it was separated within the Montgomery estate.

George Montgomery died in 1841 and his estate went to his Enery cousins of Bawnboy. In 1856 they sold the estate to take advantage of its increased value owing to the opening of the Woodford Canal through the town in the same year. The estate, including Corranierna, was split up among different purchasers. Maps and details of previous leases of the sold parts are still available.

The Tithe Applotment Books for 1827 list the following tithepayers in the townland-Garvey, Fitzpatrick, Reilly, McCormick, Grimes.

In 1829 a Sunday school was kept in the townland, funded by the Hibernian Sunday School Society.

The 1836 Ordnance Survey Namebooks describe it as- Soil white gravelly clay of middling quality. About 45 acres of bog and 23 acres of water.

The Corranierna Valuation Office books are available for February 1840.

Griffith's Valuation of 1857 lists the landlord of the townland as the Roe Estate and the tenants as Fitzpatrick, Roe, Reilly, Sheridan, Lomus, Cochrane, McGarvey, Smith, Kennedy, McCormack, Cassidy and Graham.

== Census ==
Year	Population	Males	Females	Total Houses	Uninhabited
1841	160	79	81	29	0
1851	113	58	55	23	0
1861	88	48	40	22	0
1871	86	49	37	21	0
1881	76	42	34	23	0
1891	70	36	34	20	0

A rare surviving page from the 1851 Census of Ireland lists the household of Michael Reilly of Corranierna.

In the 1901 census of Ireland, there are sixteen families listed in the townland.

In the 1911 census of Ireland, there are seventeen families listed in the townland.

== Antiquities ==
The only historic site in the townland is the disused Cavan and Leitrim Railway.
