= Killywilly =

Townland in County Cavan, Ireland

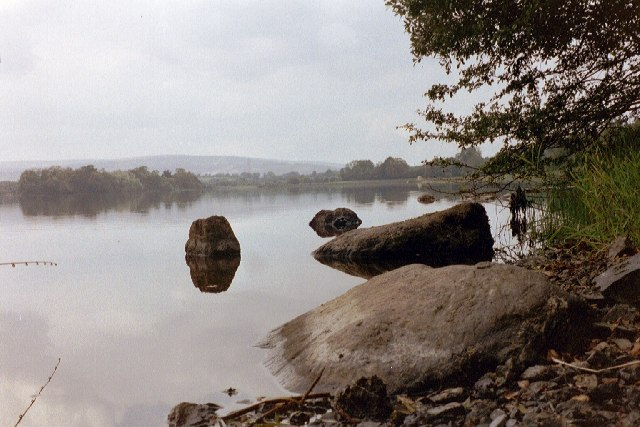
Killywilly - geograph.org.uk - 24715

Killywilly is a townland in the civil parish of Drumlane, Barony of Loughtee Lower, County Cavan, Ireland.

== Etymology ==
The townland name is an anglicisation of a Gaelic placename, either Coill Mhuilinn, meaning 'The Wood of the Mill', or Coillidh Bhuaile, meaning 'The Wood of the Cattle-Fold', or Coill an Bhealaigh, meaning ‘The Wood of the Pass’. The first name is more likely as there was a mill there at least as early as the 17th century and most of the early placename spellings are consistent with this. The earliest surviving mention of the townland is on the 1609 Ulster Plantation map of the Barony of Loughtee, where it is spelled Killivelly. A 1610 grant spells it as Keilenolin. The 1654 Commonwealth Survey spells it as Killevullin. The 1660 Books of Survey and Distribution spell it as Killycullen. The 1661 Inquisitions spell it as Kelewolin and Killewooley. The 1790 Cavan Carvaghs list spells the name as Killevally.

== Geography ==
Killywilly is bounded on the north by Annagh, County Cavan and Cuillaghan townlands, on the east by Ardue townland, on the south by Cranaghan townland and on the west by Corranierna and Mullaghduff, County Cavan townlands. Its chief geographical features are Killywilly Lough (which was named 'Logh Ardea' on the 1609 Plantation map), Annagh Lough,

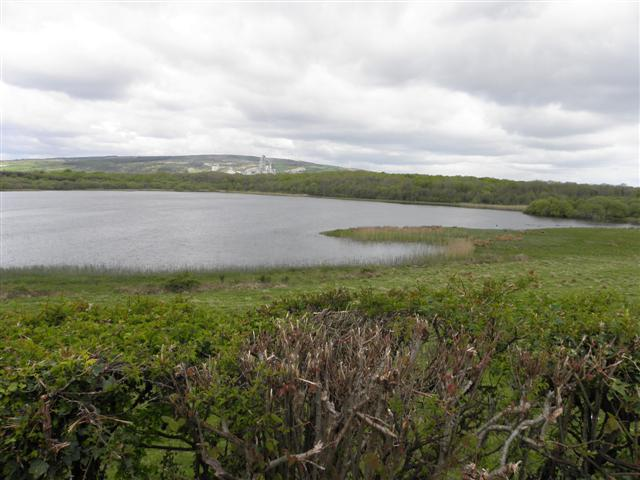
Annagh

and Cuillaghan Lough, all of which lakes contain a wide variety of coarse fish, the Rag River, woods, a drumlin hill which reaches a height of 261 feet above sea-level and dug wells. The townland is traversed by the local L1506 Road (known locally as the Yellow Road, so called because it was originally surfaced with yellow gravel and sandstone), Killywilly Lane, minor roads & lanes and the disused Cavan and Leitrim Railway. Killywilly has an area of 383 acres, including 98 acres of water.

== History ==
An Ulster Plantation grant of the 'Manor of Monaghan', dated 21 June 1610, from King James VI and I to Sir Hugh Wyrral, a native of Enfield, Essex, England, included one poll of Keilenolin. On 2 December 1628 the Manor of Monaghan, including Killywilly, was re-granted to Sir Edward Bagshawe of Finglas, who then renamed the estate as Castle Bagshaw. Bagshaw's daughter, Anne, married Thomas Richardson of Dublin, son of John Richardson, bishop of Ardagh, and the marriage settlement dated 28 May 1654 transferred the estate to the married couple. The 1654 Commonwealth Survey states the proprietor of Killevullin was 'Mr Thomas Richardson'. On 30 April 1661 the Richardsons sold part of the estate, including one & a half polls of Killewooley which included a subdivision called 'Tenorerine' (perhaps an Anglicisation of the Irish "Tamnach Rinn", meaning 'The Pasture of the Headland'), to Captain Ambrose Bedell of Carn, Tullyhunco, County Cavan. Bedell, by his will dated 20 June 1682 and proved in Dublin 20 October 1683, devised, inter alia his lands in Killerolyn with the two mills, first to his nephew James Bedell and his heirs male; and failing such to his nephew Ambrose Bedell (James Bedell's next brother) and his heirs male; and, failing such, to his (the testator's) heirs next in blood to his father William Bedell, late Lord Bishop of Kilmore.

The Tithe Applotment Books for 1833 list twenty-one tithepayers in the townland.

The Killywilly Valuation Office Field books are available for September 1838.

Griffith's Valuation of 1857 lists thirty-six occupiers in the townland.

== Census ==
Year	Population	Males	Females	Total Houses	Uninhabited
1841	153	75	78	24	0
1851	154	78	76	27	2
1861	123	64	59	23	0
1871	76	35	41	19	1
1881	64	33	31	17	3
1891	54	26	28	11	0

In the 1901 census of Ireland, there were sixteen families listed in the townland.

In the 1911 census of Ireland, there were nineteen families listed in the townland.

In 1995 there were five families in the townland.

== Antiquities ==
1. Killywilly Bridge. Stone bridge erected over the Rag River on the border with Ardue townland.
2. Killywilly House.
3. Killywilly Hedge School in the early 1800s. Supported by the Kildare Place Society. In 1835 the patron was Reverend Joseph Storey, the Church of Ireland rector of Tomregan parish from 1818 to 1835. The teachers were Robert Dixon and Mary Dixon. There were twenty-one pupils, twelve boys and nine girls. Mr. Dixon received an annual salary of £5-5s-0d plus four shillings per annum from each pupil. The subjects taught were reading, writing and arithmetic. The 1938 Dúchas Folklore Collection states: There was an old school in Killawilly. The name of the teacher was Mrs Dillon. The scholars carried turf under their arms. There were seats in the school. The teacher and pupils spoke English. The subjects that were taught were history, arithmetic, reading, writing and geography. By the 1850s the school had closed and became a private house occupied by the Greene family.
4. Corn Mill. Site of a 19th-century mill owned by the Morrow family but which existed from at least the 17th century. Part of the Rag River was converted into a Mill Race at this location. On the 1836 OS map it was located in Ardue townland but the later maps changed the boundary so it was then located in Killywilly townland.
5. Bleach and Flax Mill. On the 1836 Ordnance Survey map it is shown as a bleach mill. It was owned by John Thomas Montgomery of Ture Lodge who converted it into a flax mill some time before 1869 at the cost of £180,000. It was totally destroyed by fire on 12 October 1868. On the 1836 OS map it was located in Ardue townland but the later maps changed the boundary so it was then located in Killywilly townland.
6. Three Level Crossings on the disused Cavan and Leitrim Railway.
7. A Late Bronze Age socketed axe, 'Class 11 B' dating from c.800 BC. Found on the shore of Killywilly Lough in 1935 when water levels were lowered as a result of drainage operations on the Rag River. Now in National Museum of Ireland, Dublin, reference 1935:175.
