= Charles Hamilton (MP, born 1704) =

British politician (1704–1786)

Charles Hamilton (13 November 1704 – 18 September 1786), styled The Honourable from birth, was a British politician. He was a younger son of James Hamilton, 6th Earl of Abercorn. He represented Strabane in the Irish House of Commons between 1727 and 1760. He sat also for Truro in the British House of Commons from 1741 to 1747. He is most remembered as the creator of Painshill Park near Cobham in Surrey.

== Early life ==
Charles Hamilton was born in Dublin in 1704, the 9th son and 14th child of James Hamilton, 6th Earl of Abercorn. In 1718, he became a pupil at Westminster School, where he was a contemporary of John Petty, 1st Earl of Shelburne, the future owner of Bowood House.

Hamilton began studying at Oxford University in 1720, where he formed friendships with Henry Hoare, who would later create the gardens at Stourhead, Wiltshire, and the brothers Stephen Fox, the future 1st Earl of Ilchester, and Henry Fox, the future 1st Baron Holland. After gaining a BA in 1723, Hamilton set off on his first Grand Tour in 1725 and, while in Rome, collected numerous artworks and became familiar with the landscape paintings of Claude Lorrain, Nicolas Poussin and Salvator Rosa. During his second visit to Rome in 1732, Hamilton was introduced to George Knapton, the artist and dealer, and his portrait was painted by Antonio David.

== Political career ==
Hamilton became the member of the Irish House of Commons for Strathbane in 1727, representing the constituency until 1760. He sat also for Truro in the British House of Commons from 1741 to 1747. He was elected a Fellow of the Royal Society in March 1747.

In 1738, Hamilton began working as Clerk Comptroller to Frederick, Prince of Wales, a position from which he was dismissed in 1747. Between 1743 and 1757, he was receiver general in Minorca.

== Painshill Park ==
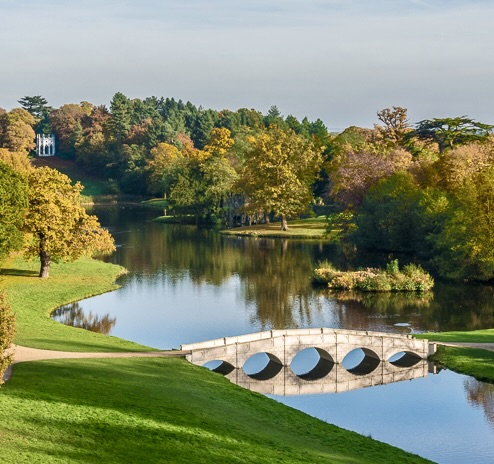
The lake at Painshill Park

Hamilton began to acquire property at Painshill near Cobham in Surrey in 1737, eventually creating an estate of more than 200 acres (81 hectares). He may have become familiar with the local area through his friendship with the Fox family, who owned the nearby Downe Place, known later as Cobham Park. He moved to Painshill in 1738 and began to create the park shortly afterwards. A map by John Rocque, dated 1744, indicates that the first part of the lake had been dug out and formal areas of planting had been created. In the mid-1740s, Hamilton began planting exotics, non-native species of trees and shrubs, some of which were supplied by John Bartram, an American horticulturalist. The majority of the follies and other architectural features at Painshill were constructed in the late 1750s and early 1760s, although work on the Grotto continued until around 1770.

Although Hamilton had received an income while working as Clerk Comptroller to Frederick, Prince of Wales, he also borrowed money from Henry Hoare and Henry Fox to finance the work at Painshill. The repayment of these loans became due in 1773 and Hamilton was forced to sell the estate to Benjamin Bond Hopkins.

== Design work at other gardens ==
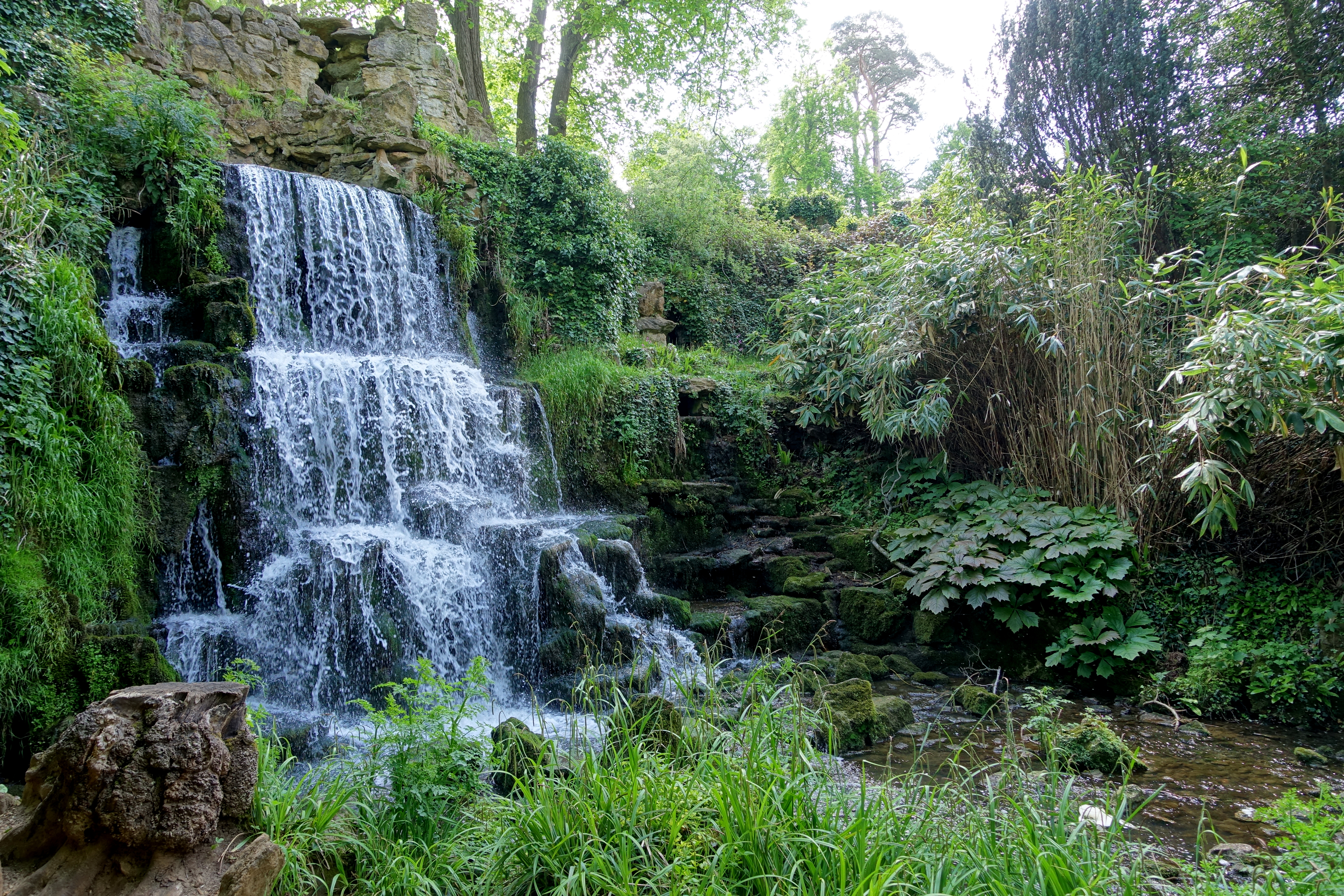
The Cascade at Bowood

Hamilton designed the Cascade at Bowood, Wiltshire, for John Petty, 1st Earl of Shelburne. He also advised on the layout and planting scheme for Holland Park, Kensington, and may have been consulted on the design of the landscape garden at Saltram House, Devon.

== Marriages and children ==
The details of Hamilton's first marriage are unclear. His wife, whose name is unknown, gave birth to two daughters, Jane and Sarah, but died young. He married his second wife, Agnes Cockburn of Ayr, Scotland in 1772, but she died the same year, aged 39. He married Frances Calvert at Walcot, Bath on 11 August 1774.

== Retirement and death ==
After selling Painshill in 1773, Charles Hamilton moved to Bath, Somerset. He died at his house in Lansdown Road on 11 September 1786 and was buried in Bath Abbey.

Parliament of Ireland
Preceded by Richard Stewart; John McCausland	Member of Parliament for Strabane; 1727–1760; With: John McCausland 1727–1729; Oliver McCausland 1729–1733; William Hamilton 1733–1763	Succeeded by Robert Lowry; William Hamilton
Parliament of Great Britain
Preceded by Kelland Courtenay; Robert Trefusis	Member of Parliament for Truro; 1741–1747; With: James Hammond 1741–1742; Edward Boscawen 1742–1747	Succeeded by Edward Boscawen; John Boscawen
