= Strabane (Parliament of Ireland constituency) =

Pre-1801 Irish constituency

Coordinates: 54.823°N 7.468°W

- Former borough constituency for the Irish House of Commons
- County: County Tyrone
- Borough: Strabane

–1801
- Replaced by: Disfranchised

Strabane was a constituency represented in the Irish House of Commons until 1800.

== Members of Parliament ==
Election	First MP	Second MP
1613	James Montgomery	Daniel Molyneux
1634	Richard FitzGerald	Charles Mouncke
1639	Richard FitzGerald	James Galbraith
1661	Alexander Staples, expelled and repl, 1665 by Sir Peter Harvey	John Craige
1666	James Hamilton	
1689	Christopher Nugent	Peter Donnelly
1692	Sir Matthew Bridges	Oliver McCausland
1695	Audley Mervyn	Oliver McCausland
1703	James Topham	Oliver McCausland
1713	Gustavus Hamilton	Oliver McCausland
1715	Richard Stewart	Oliver McCausland
1723	Richard Stewart	Henry Colley
1725	Richard Stewart	John McCausland
1727	Hon. Charles Hamilton	John McCausland
1729	Hon. Charles Hamilton	Oliver McCausland
1733	Hon. Charles Hamilton	William Hamilton
1761	Robert Lowry	William Hamilton
1763	Robert Lowry	John Stuart Hamilton (Note: from 1781 Sir John Hamilton, 1st Bt)
1765	George Montgomery	John Stuart Hamilton
1768	William Brownlow	John Stuart Hamilton
1769	Claude Hamilton	John Stuart Hamilton
1776	Henry Pomeroy (Note: from 1783 Hon. Henry Pomeroy)	John Stuart Hamilton
January 1798	Nathaniel Montgomery-Moore	John Stewart
1798	Nathaniel Montgomery-Moore	Andrew Knox
1801	Constituency disenfranchised	

=== Notes and references ===
- Paul, Sir James Balfour (1904), The Scots Peerage, Founded on Wood's Edition of Sir Robert Douglas's Peerage of Scotland, vol. 1, Edinburgh: David Douglas – Abercorn to Balmerino

=== Further reading ===
- Johnston-Liik, Edith Mary (2007), History of the Irish Parliament 1692–1800, Belfast: Ulster Historical Foundation, ISBN 9781903688717

=== External links ===
- Leigh Rayment's historical List of Members of the Irish House of Commons. Cites: Johnston-Liik, Edith Mary (2002). The History of the Irish Parliament 1692-1800 (6 volumes). Ulster Historical Foundation.
- Parliamentary Memoirs of Fermanagh and Tyrone, from 1613 to 1885
