= Nathaniel Montgomery-Moore =

Irish politician

Colonel Nathaniel Montgomery-Moore (1757 – 4 December 1834) of Garvey, Co. Tyrone and Fassaroe Castle, Co. Wicklow was an Irish Member of Parliament.

He was the son of General Alexander Montgomery of Ballyleck, Co. Monaghan, M.P. for County Monaghan in 1743–1760 and 1768–1783.

Nathaniel was the eldest son of his father's second wife Eleanora Moore, daughter of Acheson Moore of Garvey. His full sisters were Sidney and Maria Montgomery. His father's first wife was Catharine Willoughby, daughter of Colonel Hugh Willoughby of Carrow, County Fermanagh in 1746, by whom he had Nathaniel's three half-brothers Colonel John Montgomery (M.P. for County Monaghan. Colonel in the Monaghan Militia. d.s.p.), Colonel Hugh Montgomery (1749–1794, Colonel in the Honourable East India Company's service. Died unmarried in Madras, India), Revd Robert Montgomery (1753–1825, Rector of Monaghan). Nathaniel assumed in right of his mother the surname and arms of Moore.

He was elected an MP in the Parliament of Ireland for County Tyrone in 1781 and for Strabane in 1798 and was appointed High Sheriff of Tyrone for 1786–77. He was appointed Lieutenant-Colonel of the Royal Tyrone Militia on 1 June 1794 and commanded the regiment during the Irish Rebellion of 1798. He resigned on 30 April 1799.

He died in 1834. He had married Mary Anne, the daughter of Alexander Boyd, of Ballycastle, Co. Antrim and had four sons. He was succeeded by his eldest son, Alexander James Montgomery-Moore.
