= Dúchas =

Former Irish State agency

Dúchas, sometimes Dúchas: The Heritage Service, was an executive agency of the Department of Arts, Heritage, Gaeltacht and the Islands of the Government of Ireland responsible for Heritage management, including:

- natural heritage (including responsibility for the management of national parks and wildlife)
- built heritage (including national monuments and historic properties).

The agency was established under the Heritage Act 1995 and abolished in 2003 after coming under criticism for restricting development. Its status as an executive agency gave it no separate legal existence and it could be easily abolished without primary legislation, although the abolition was not without controversy. Natural heritage has since been protected by the National Parks and Wildlife Service (initially under the Department of the Environment, Heritage and Local Government). Some other functions, such as the protection of historic monuments, reverted to being part of the Office of Public Works.

Since 2020, built and natural heritage have been under the remit of the Department of Housing, Local Government and Heritage.
