= George Leslie Montgomery =

Irish politician

George Leslie Montgomery (c. 1727 – March 1787) was an Irish politician.

Montgomery sat as Member of Parliament (MP) for Strabane from 1765 to 1768. He purchased the seat from John McCausland of Strabane for £2,000 after the death of the incumbent Robert Lowry when a new writ was issued for the borough on 22 October 1765. Subsequently, he represented County Cavan in the Irish House of Commons from 1768 until his death in 1787. The Cavan poll result on 2 August 1768 was Maxwell 727, Montgomery 648, Pratt 570, Newburgh 402; The poll finally closed on 11 November 1768 and the final poll was Maxwell 927, Montgomery 739, Pratt 668, Newburgh 451. When the new Parliament met in 1769, Mervyn Pratt, the defeated candidate, petitioned against the election of Montgomery on grounds of bribery, corruption and undue influence. This petition was not finally determined owing to the premature prorogation of Parliament in December 1769, so Montgomery survived and continued to represent the county until his death. He had previously stood as a candidate for Cavan in the 1761 general election but was defeated.

The youngest son of George Leslie D.D. (Rector of Clones & Kilmore) and Margaret Montgomery (sister of Colonel Alexander Montgomery (1686–1729) of Convoy House, County Donegal and Ballyconnell House, County Cavan) and first cousin of James Leslie, Bishop of Limerick, Ardfert and Aghadoe. Alexander Montgomery (1686–1729) died in 1729 and left the Ballyconnell estate of about 4,000 statute acres to his nephew George Leslie who then assumed the name George Leslie Montgomery. He was in the inner circle of the Irish Parliament but his low-church Northern background clung to him and whilst he became a general of volunteers and supported Flood, he opposed any relaxation of the laws against Catholics. He was High Sheriff of Cavan in 1752 and in the same year he married Hannah Clements, the daughter of fellow Cavan MP Nathaniel Clements but his only son George was declared a lunatic. "The Irish Parliament 1775" states- "He obtained a Barrack Master's place @ £150 per annum, for his Friend. He is Son-in-Law to Mr. Clements. On some few Questions during Lord Townshend's Administration He voted with Government. In Lord Harcourt's Administration He has been constantly against, and hates all Government.". Sketches of the Members of the Irish Parliament in 1782 stated- "George Montgomery Esq., member for County Cavan has a pretty good estate, but not a foot of land in the county he represents-is brother in law of Mr Clements-but acts independently and uniformly opposed Government till the Duke of Portland arrived-a dull and tiring speaker.".

He lived in a leased house at 12 North Frederick Street, Dublin when attending parliament.

He was the head of the local militia in Ballyconnell.

== See also ==
- Ballyconnell
- Alexander Montgomery (1686–1729)

Parliament of Ireland
Preceded by John Stuart Hamilton; William Hamilton	Member of Parliament for Strabane; 1765–1768; With: John Stuart Hamilton	Succeeded by John Stuart Hamilton; William Brownlow
Preceded by Lord Newtown-Butler; William Stewart	Member of Parliament for County Cavan; 1768–1787; With: Hon. Barry Maxwell 1768–1780; Hon. John James Maxwell 1780–1783; Charles Stewart 1783–1787	Succeeded by Charles Stewart; John Maxwell
