= Lunatic =

Antiquated adjective epithet of one given to lunacy

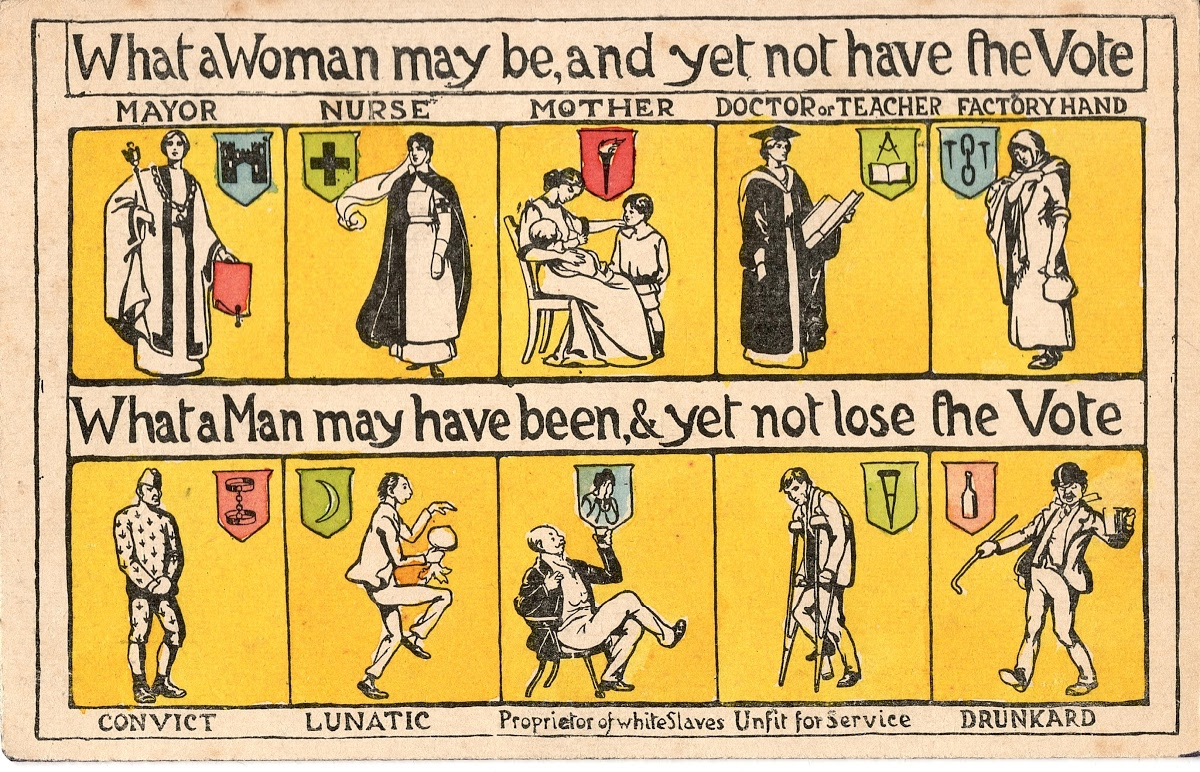
A suffragist postcard depicting a lunatic, symbolized by a moon

Lunatic is a term referring to a person who is seen as mentally ill, dangerous, foolish, or crazy—conditions once attributed to "lunacy". The word derives from lunaticus meaning "of the moon" or "moonstruck".

== History ==
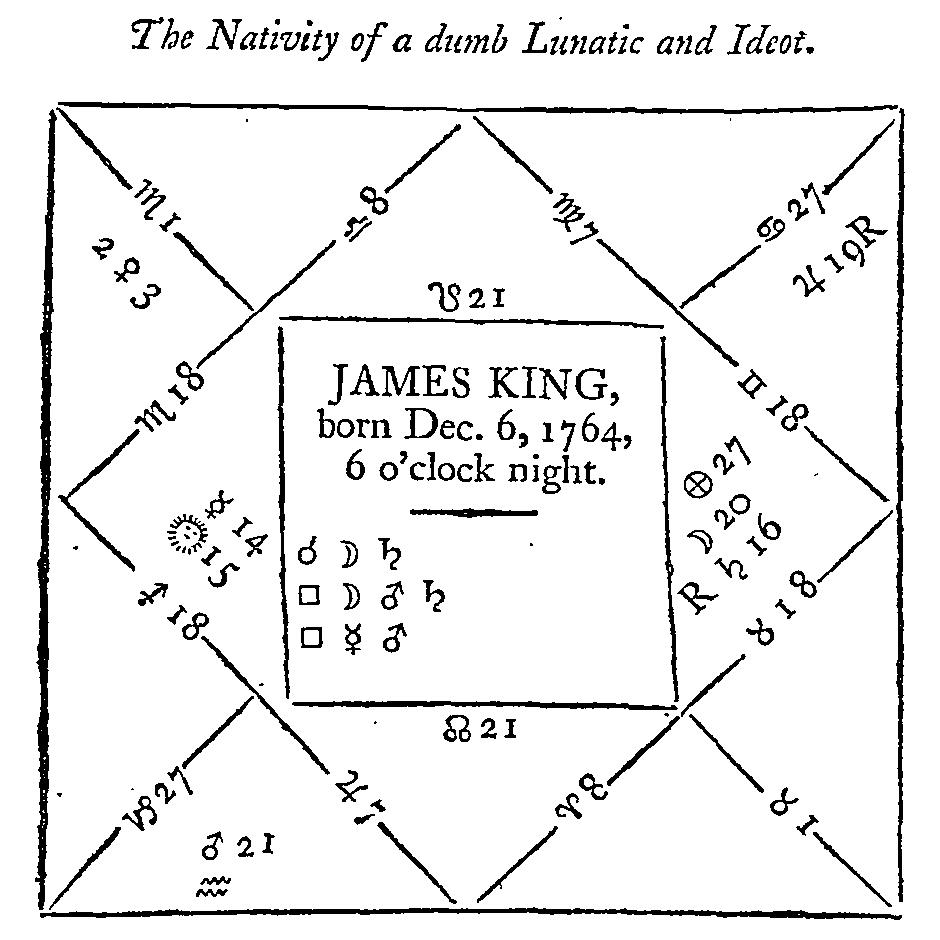
The horoscope of a "dumb Lunatic and Ideot" according to an astrologer who describes how the positions of the planets Saturn and Mars with respect to the moon are the cause of "diseases of the mind"

The term "lunatic" derives from the Latin word lunaticus, which originally referred mainly to epilepsy and madness, as diseases thought to be caused by the moon. The King James Version of the Bible records "lunatick" in the Gospel of Matthew, which has been interpreted as a reference to epilepsy. By the fourth and fifth centuries, astrologers were commonly using the term to refer to neurological and psychiatric diseases. Pliny the Elder argued that the full moon induced individuals to lunacy and epilepsy by effects on the brain analogous to the nocturnal dew. Until at least 1700, it was also a common belief that the moon influenced fevers, rheumatism, episodes of epilepsy and other diseases.

== Use of the term "lunatic" in legislation ==
In the jurisdiction of England and Wales, the Madhouses Act 1774 originated what later became Metropolitan Commissioners in Lunacy, under the Madhouses Act 1828. The Lunacy Acts 1890–1922 referred to "lunatics", but the Mental Treatment Act 1930 changed the legal term to "person of unsound mind", an expression which was replaced under the Mental Health Act 1959 by "mental illness". "Person of unsound mind" was the term used in 1950 in the English version of the European Convention on Human Rights as one of the types of person who could be deprived of liberty by a judicial process. The 1930 Act also replaced the term "asylum" with "mental hospital". Criminal lunatics became Broadmoor patients in 1948 under the National Health Service Act 1946.

On December 5, 2012, the US House of Representatives passed legislation approved earlier by the US Senate removing the word "lunatic" from all federal laws in the United States. President Barack Obama signed the 21st Century Language Act of 2012 into law on December 28, 2012.

"Of unsound mind" or non compos mentis are alternatives to "lunatic", the most conspicuous term used for insanity in the law in the late 19th century.

== Lunar distance ==
The term lunatic was sometimes used to describe those who sought to discover a reliable method of determining longitude (before John Harrison developed the marine chronometer method of determining longitude, the main theory was the Method of Lunar Distances, advanced by Astronomer Royal Nevil Maskelyne). The artist William Hogarth portrayed a "longitude lunatic" in the eight scene of his 1733 work A Rake's Progress. Twenty years later, though, Hogarth described John Harrison's H-1 chronometer as "one of the most exquisite movements ever made."

Later, members of the Lunar Society of Birmingham called themselves lunaticks. In an age with little street lighting, the society met on or near the night of the full moon.

== See also ==
- Bedlam
- Lunar effect
- History of psychiatry
- History of psychiatric institutions
