= State paper =

A state paper is a document or file kept by a government to record discussions, options and decisions by government officials, departments and civil servants. Some states follow a thirty year rule whereby state papers on an issue may be released to academic scrutiny thirty years after an original discussion or decision.

State papers are often kept in a country's National Archives, State Paper Office or Public Record Office. All files are numbered using an alphanumeric code which academics may use as a reference in footnotes of books.

Some state papers are embargoed for reasons of national security or other sensitive reasons.

== See also ==
- British Public Record Office
- French Archives nationales
- National Archives of Ireland
- United States National Archives and Records Administration
- Vatican Secret Archives
