= Listiernan =

Townland in County Cavan, Ireland

Listiernan (Irish derived place name, Lios Tighearnán meaning 'The Fort of Tighearnán mac Maenuigh', after whom the McKiernan Clan is named and who lived in the fort, c. 1080-1120.) is a townland in the civil parish of Kildallan, barony of Tullyhunco, County Cavan, Ireland.

== Geography ==
Listiernan is bounded on the north by Carn, Tullyhunco and Kilnacross townlands, on the west by Kildallan townland, on the south by Bocade Glebe and Feugh (Bishops) townlands and on the east by Drumquill, Killyfern and Kilnaglare townlands. Its chief geographical features are Listiernan Hill which reaches to 362 feet, small streams, dug wells, spring wells and forestry plantations. Listiernan is traversed by minor public roads and rural lanes. The townland covers 391 acres.

== History ==
From medieval times up to the early 1600s, the land belonged to the McKiernan Clan and is probably the first place they settled in County Cavan after migrating from County Leitrim.

The 1609 Plantation of Ulster Map depicts the townland as Listerna. A grant of 1610 spells the name as Listernan. A lease of 1611 spells the name as Listernan. An inquisition of 1629 spells the name as Lysternan. The 1652 Commonwealth Survey spells it as Listiernan.

In the Plantation of Ulster King James VI and I by grant dated 27 June 1610, granted the Manor of Keylagh, which included two polls in Listernan, to John Achmootie, a Scottish Groom of the Bedchamber. His brother Alexander Achmootie was granted the neighbouring Manor of Dromheada. On 16 August 1610 John Aghmootie sold his lands in Tullyhunco to James Craig. On 1 May 1611 James Craig leased, inter alia, 2 polls of Listernan to John mac Edmond Oge McKernan. On 29 July 1611 Arthur Chichester, 1st Baron Chichester and others reported that John Auchmothy and Alexander Auchmothye have not appeared at the lands awarded to them. James Craige is their deputy for five years, who has brought 4 artificers of divers sorts with their wives and families and 2 other servants. Stone raised for building a mill and trees felled, a walled house with a smith's forge built, 4 horses and mares upon the grounds with competent arms. An Inquisition held at Ballyconnell on 2 November 1629 stated that the two polls of Lysternan contained eleven sub-divisions named Drommean, Dromshorte, Knocknehearne, Tuonorbie, Kynnagh, Drommane, Tawnelyn, Corraghe, Knockneden, Knockeban and Tawnegallen. Sir James Craig died in the siege of Croaghan Castle on 8 April 1642. His land was inherited by his brother John Craig of Craig Castle, County Cavan and of Craigston, County Leitrim, who was chief doctor to both King James I and Charles I. The 1652 Commonwealth Survey states the owner was Lewis Craig. Ambrose Bedell, the son of William Bedell, Bishop of Kilmore, then purchased Listiernan from the Craig estate. In his will dated 20 June 1682 and proved in Dublin on 20 October 1683, Captain Ambrose Bedell directed that he should be buried in the churchyard of Kilmore beside his father. He devised his lands in Carne and Listiernan, Dromheriffe and Uragh, Killerolyn with the two mills, Antner, Ardue, Clony, Clonachatige, and Greaghrahen, first to his nephew James Bedell and his heirs male; and failing such to his nephew Ambrose Bedell (James Bedell's next brother) and his heirs male; and, failing such, to his (the testator's) heirs next in blood to his father William, late Lord Bishop of Kilmore.

In the Hearth Money Rolls compiled on 29 September 1663 there was one Hearth Tax payer in Listernan- Neale McNeale.

The 1790 Cavan Carvaghs list spells the townland name as Listernan.

Ambrose Leet's 1814 Directory spells the name as Listernan.

The 1825 Tithe Applotment Books list seventy tithepayers in the townland.

In the 1825 Registry of Freeholders for County Cavan there was one freeholder registered in Listernan: James Brady. He was a Forty-shilling freeholders holding a lease for lives from his landlord, Mr Stanford.

The Listiernan Valuation Office Field books are available for April 1838.

Griffith's Valuation of 1857 lists thirty-eight landholders in the townland.

In the 19th century Listiernan was owned by Captain Bedel Stanford. The Stanford Estate papers are in the National Archives of Ireland.

== Census ==
Year	Population	Males	Females	Total Houses	Uninhabited
1841	205	101	104	33	0
1851	169	79	90	33	0
1861	127	64	63	27	1
1871	107	58	49	24	0
1881	97	52	45	21	1
1891	89	47	42	20	0

In the 1901 census of Ireland, there were nineteen families listed in the townland.

In the 1911 census of Ireland, there were twenty-two families listed in the townland.

== Antiquities ==
1. An earthen fort. It is described in the ‘Archaeological Survey of County Cavan’ as- Raised circular area (int. dims. 45.2m NNW-SSE; c. 44m ENE-WSW) enclosed by three earthen banks with outer fosses. From SE-S-SSW the outer fosse and bank and the intermediate fosse have been levelled but their outline is still identifiable. An earlier report (OPW 1969) suggested that the original entrance was probably at SE. Densely overgrown with vegetation. This is the fort that the townland is named after and is the original home of the McKiernan Clan.
