= Ture, Drumlane =

Townland in County Cavan, Ireland

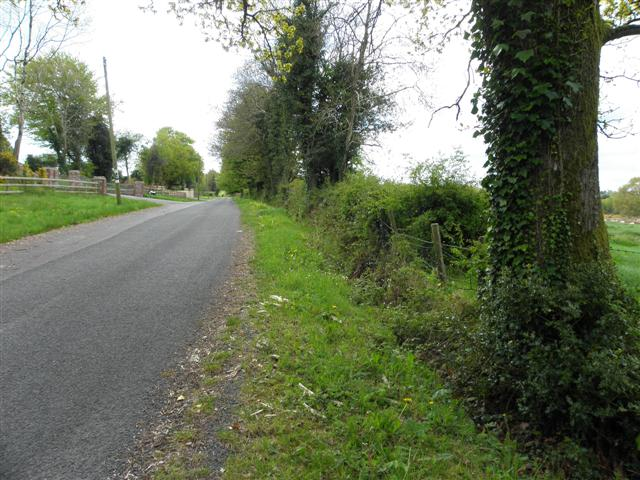
Road at Ture - geograph.org.uk - 1854933

Ture is a townland in the civil parish of Drumlane, Barony of Loughtee Lower, County Cavan, Ireland.

== Etymology ==
The townland name is an anglicisation of a Gaelic placename, An t-Iúr, meaning 'The Yew Tree'. The local pronunciation is 'Chew-R '. The earliest surviving mention of the townland is on the 1609 Ulster Plantation map of the Barony of Loughtee, where it is spelled Anture. A 1610 grant spells it as Anture. A 1611 grant spells it as Ardea. An Inquisition dated 30 September 1628 spells it as Antnar. The 1654 Commonwealth Survey spells it as Ture. The 1660 Books of Survey and Distribution spell it as Ture. The 1661 Inquisitions spell it as Antoore alias Antuer and Anture. The 1790 Cavan Carvaghs list spells the name as Anlure.

== Geography ==
Ture is bounded on the north by Ardue townland, on the east by Clowney townland, on the south by Ballyhugh and Clonamullig townlands and on the west by Cranaghan and Greaghrahan townlands. Its chief geographical features are Killywilly Lough,

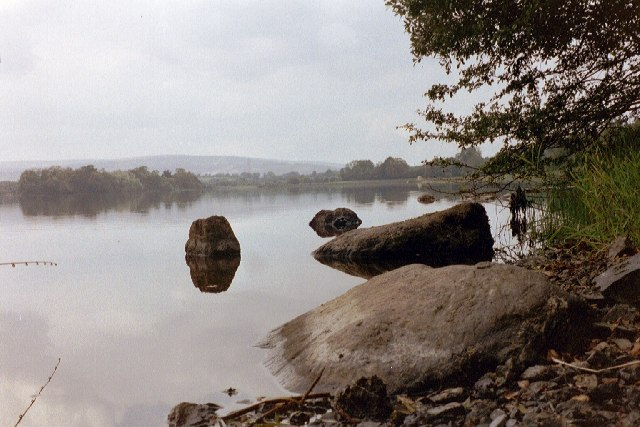
Killywilly - geograph.org.uk - 24715

Clonamullig Lough, which lakes contain a wide variety of coarse fish, a small rivulet, woods & plantations and drumlin hills which reach a height of 234 feet above sea-level. The townland is traversed by the National Secondary N87 road (Ireland), minor roads & lanes. Ture has an area of 242 acres, including 33 acres of water.

== History ==
An Ulster Plantation grant of the 'Manor of Monaghan', dated 21 June 1610, from King James VI and I to Sir Hugh Wyrral, a native of Enfield, Essex, England, included one poll of Anture. On 2 December 1628 the Manor of Monaghan, including Ture, was re-granted to Sir Edward Bagshawe of Finglas, who then renamed the estate as Castle Bagshaw. Bagshaw's daughter, Anne, married Thomas Richardson of Dublin, son of John Richardson, bishop of Ardagh, and the marriage settlement dated 28 May 1654 transferred the estate to the married couple. The 1654 Commonwealth Survey states the proprietor of Ture was 'Mr Thomas Richardson'. On 30 April 1661 the Richardsons sold part of the estate, including one poll of Anture, to Captain Ambrose Bedell of Carn, Tullyhunco, County Cavan. Bedell, by his will dated 20 June 1682 and proved in Dublin 20 October 1683, devised, inter alia his lands in Antner, first to his nephew James Bedell and his heirs male; and failing such to his nephew Ambrose Bedell (James Bedell's next brother) and his heirs male; and, failing such, to his (the testator's) heirs next in blood to his father William Bedell, late Lord Bishop of Kilmore.

Henry Patterson of Ture is a party to a deed dated 24 Feb 1776.

A deed by George Montgomery dated 2 September 1780 grants lands in Ture to Roseanna Patterson, widow of Ture, and Alexander Pringle of Ballyhue.

The Tithe Applotment Books for 1833 list four tithepayers in the townland: Montgomery, Storey, Patterson and Jones.

The Ture Valuation Office Field books are available for October 1838.

Griffith's Valuation of 1857 lists three occupiers in the townland: Reilly, Storey and Berry.

The 19th century land occupation history is set out in the 1880 court case, 'Montgomery versus Storey'.

== Greaghrahan National School ==
This was opened on 31 May 1961 to replace an earlier school in Greaghrahan townland and so retained the former name, although located in a different townland. The new building was a vast improvement with running water and flushing toilets. In the 1970s the school was further modernised, with the installation of electric lighting. The schoolyard was re-surfaced and a teachers’ carpark was provided. In 1987 it became a three teacher school and a prefab was erected on the site. In 2005 it was completely refurbished, to include three modern spacious classrooms with toilets, learning support rooms and general purpose room. Outside facilities include two large playing courts for games, a large tarmacadam play area and a spacious green area. In recent years the play area has been further enhanced by the erection of a trim trail or mini obstacle course and a CLÁR funded multi-use soft play area with equipment.

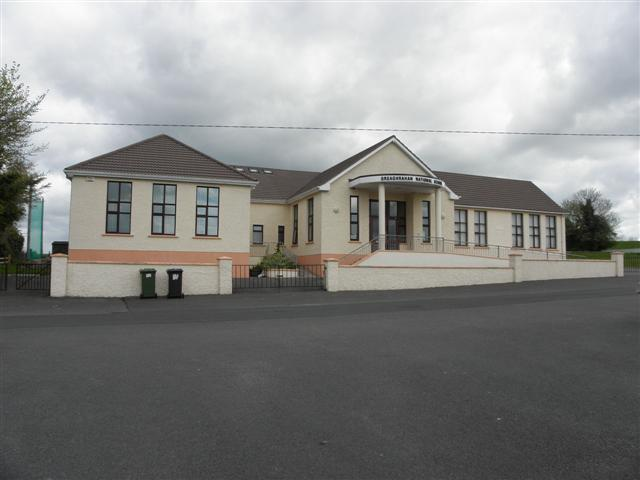
Greaghrahan National School - geograph.org.uk - 1854943

== Census ==
Year	Population	Males	Females	Total Houses	Uninhabited
1841	33	16	17	6	0
1851	12	7	5	3	1
1861	8	4	4	3	0
1871	18	6	12	3	0
1881	1	1	0	3	2
1891	0	0	0	1	1

In the 1901 census of Ireland, there was one family listed in the townland.

In the 1911 census of Ireland, there was one family listed in the townland.

In 1995 there were three families in the townland.

== Antiquities ==
1. Ture Lodge a.k.a. Ture house. 19th century residence at different times of the Jones, Storey and Griffith families. Ambrose Leet's 1814 Directory states the occupier of Ture-lodge was John Montgomery Jones.

== Sources ==
McGuinn, J., ed. (1995). 'Staghall : A History 1846–1996'. Cavan: A Church Committee Publication.
