= Kilnacross =

Townland in County Cavan, Ireland

Kilnacross (Irish derived place name, Coill na Croise meaning 'The Wood of the Crosses') is a townland in the civil parish of Kildallan, barony of Tullyhunco, County Cavan, Ireland.

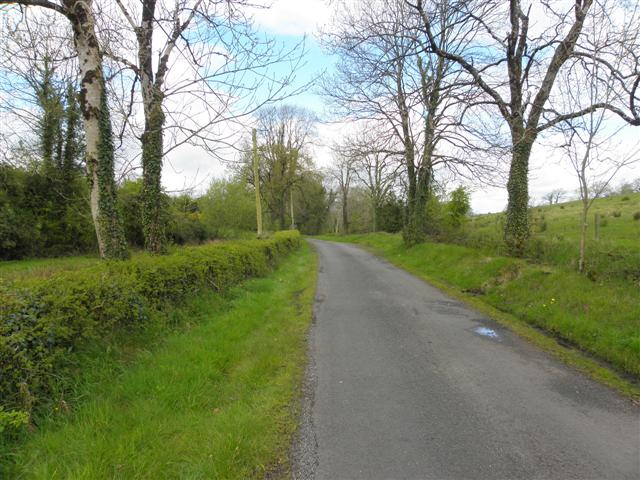
Road at Kilnacross (geograph 2915572)

== Geography ==
Kilnacross is bounded on the east by Clontycoo, Kilnaglare and Mullaghboy townlands, on the west by Carn, Tullyhunco townland, on the south by Listiernan townland and on the north by Ballyhugh townland. Its chief geographical features are Carn Lough, small streams, a dug well and spring wells. Kilnacross is traversed by minor public roads and rural lanes. The townland covers 110 acres. It is around 5 km south-east of Ballyconnell.

== Etymology ==
The derivation of the placename is given in the Life of Saint Máedóc of Ferns compiled in 1536 from earlier sources, where it is spelled as Coill na gCros. The text states,

Aed Dub (the Black) son of Fergna, son of Fergus, the king of the Ui Briuin, heard of the manifold miracles done by Maedoc, and the honour and great reverence which he had received at Rome, and the two noble and illustrious gifts which he had received there, the variegated (crozier) and the staff. He came zealously to him, and fasted humbly to him (asking him) to obtain from God for him a change of form and feature, for up to that time he was hideous. Maedoc then put the head of Aed under his cowl. Aed fell asleep on the spot under Maedoc's cowl; and the form which he put upon him was the form of Aedan son of Eicnech the one most beautiful man of all the men of Erin in his time. He was afterwards baptized at Ath Airm (Weapon Ford) in Coill na gCros (Wood of the Crosses); and it is from the marking of the king with the Cross, and his consignation, that the place is called Coill na gCros, and Ath Airm from the weapons and dress of the king which were taken from him while he was being baptized and blessed (and were given) in perpetuity to God and to Maedoc. And the name a man ill-favoured and Aed Finn (the Fair) was given him; and he gave to Maedoc a scruple from every house under his authority as his baptism-fee, and he gave himself in perpetuity to God and to Maedoc for ever, and that there should never be any right of distraint on territory or tribe to any of the seed of Aed Finn who should divert his service and dues from Maedoc. For every plague and war and destruction of men, that has come or shall come, upon the Ui Briuin or men of Breifne, is due to the curse and heavy displeasure of Maedoc at their withholding his service and dues, and to their neglecting his tribute.

One of the earlier sources of the Life is a poem supposedly written by Sidrac Mór O’Cuirnin (died in 1347, but the authorship is disputed by Gillespie who opines it was written by the compiler of the Life in 1536), which states in paragraph 270 of above work,

After Maedoc had crossed the sea-
It was a famous mighty work of his
When he baptized Aed Dub at Ath Airm,
Whereby he departed for every one from his first name.
Aed the Fair, from that day forth
There came, by virtue of his baptism,
The two Breifnes under the saint's authority,
Not by way of refusal of either part.

There are a lot of reasons to doubt the above account. Firstly it is a copy of a similar miracle performed on Aedh Dubh by Saint Caillín of Fenagh, County Leitrim. Secondly it is also a copy of a similar miracle performed on Aedh Dubh by Saint Berach of Termonbarry. Thirdly the Uí Briúin Bréifne had no presence in County Cavan until about two hundred years after the time Aedh Dubh lived. It is evident the fable was a 14th century fabrication by the Augustinian monks of the nearby Drumlane monastery. They used it to extort tribute from the O'Rourke and O'Reilly clans by pretending the ancestor of those clans, Aedh Dubh, had promised tribute to Drumlane.

In the Dúchas folklore collection a similar tale is told to explain the name of Kilnagross townland in County Leitrim.

== History ==
From medieval times up to the early 1600s, the land belonged to the McKiernan Clan.

The 1540 Life of Mogue spells it as Coill na gCros. The 1609 Plantation of Ulster Map depicts the townland as "Keilnagros". A grant of 1610 spells the name as "Killnagrosse". A lease of 1611 spells the name as "Killingrosse". An inquisition of 1629 spells the name as "Kyllnagrosse". The 1652 Commonwealth Survey spells the name as "Kilnegrosse".

In the Plantation of Ulster King James VI and I by grant dated 27 June 1610, granted the Manor of Keylagh, which included one poll in Killnagrosse, to John Achmootie, a Scottish Groom of the Bedchamber. His brother Alexander Achmootie was granted the neighbouring Manor of Dromheada. On 16 August 1610 John Aghmootie sold his lands in Tullyhunco to James Craig. On 1 May 1611 James Craig leased, inter alia, "1 poll of Killingrosse to Eugene mac Cahell McKernan". On 29 July 1611 Arthur Chichester, 1st Baron Chichester and others reported that "John Auchmothy and Alexander Auchmothye have not appeared at the lands awarded to them. James Craige is their deputy for five years, who has brought 4 artificers of divers sorts with their wives and families and 2 other servants. Stone raised for building a mill and trees felled, a walled house with a smith's forge built, 4 horses and mares upon the grounds with competent arms". An Inquisition held at Ballyconnell on 2 November 1629 stated that the poll of Kyllnagrosse contained nine sub-divisions named "Towneymuckkellagh, Tawnegrassey, Mullaghdrissogagh, Cortubber, Tawnenichall, Tawnegarrawe, Mullaghdeavagh, Lismeaghenbonilagh and Moyghreigogartie". Sir James Craig died in the siege of Croaghan Castle on 8 April 1642. His land was inherited by his brother John Craig of Craig Castle, County Cavan and of Craigston, County Leitrim, who was chief doctor to both King James I and Charles I. The 1652 Commonwealth Survey lists the townland as belonging to Lewis Craig.

In the Hearth Money Rolls compiled on 29 September 1663 there were three Hearth Tax payers in Kilnegrosse alias Cilnecros- Hugh McGilmartin, James McIlmartin and Laghlin Brady.

The 1790 Cavan Carvaghs list spells the townland name as "Kilnecross".

The 1825 Tithe Applotment Books list three tithepayers in the townland.

The Kilnacross Valuation Office books are available for April 1838.

Griffith's Valuation of 1857 lists five landholders in the townland.

In the 19th century Kilnacross was partly owned by Captain Bedel Stanford. The Stanford Estate papers are in the National Archives of Ireland.

== Census ==
Year	Population	Males	Females	Total Houses	Uninhabited
1841	14	6	8	4	1
1851	14	7	7	3	1
1861	16	7	9	3	1
1871	16	9	7	3	0
1881	10	5	5	3	1
1891	7	3	4	3	1

In the 1901 census of Ireland, there were four families listed in the townland.

In the 1911 census of Ireland, there were three families listed in the townland.

== Antiquities ==
1. A Holy Well called Tobermogue (Máedóc's Well) which is the supposed site of the Ath Airm referred to in the above etymology. The 'Archaeological Inventory of County Cavan' (Site No. 1770), describes it as "Marked on all OS eds. Situated in wet low-lying ground. Large irregular pool now used as a watering-hole for cattle".
2. Kilnacross Church of Ireland National School.
3. A foot-stick over the stream which is the site of the ford of Ath Airm.
