= Greaghrahan =

Greaghran
- townland

Irish transcription(s)
  - Derivation: Gréach Raithin
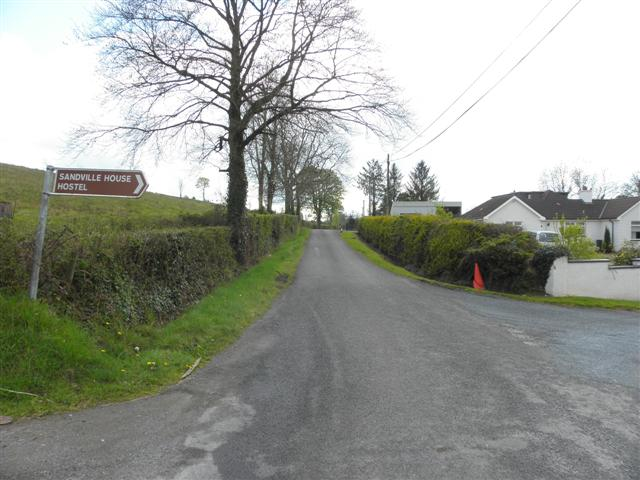
- Road junction in Greaghrahan townland. The road to the right leads into Aghavoher townland.

- Greaghrahan shown within Ireland
- Coordinates: 54°05′29″N 7°32′46″W
- Country: Ireland
- County: County Cavan
- Barony Ardue: Lower Loughtee
- Civil parish: Drumlane

Area
  - Total: 115.60 ha (285.66 acres)

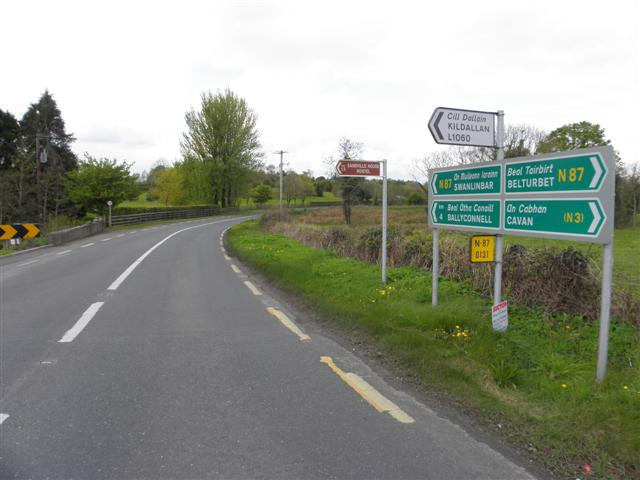
N87, Greaghrahan (geograph 2915696)

Greaghrahan is a townland in the civil parish of Drumlane, Barony of Loughtee Lower, County Cavan, Ireland.

== Etymology ==
The townland name is an anglicisation of a Gaelic placename, Gréach Raithin, meaning either 'The Rough-Pastureland of the Ferns', or "The Rough-Pastureland of the Little Fort". The local pronunciation is ' Grah-Rah-In '. The 1609 Ulster Plantation map of the Barony of Loughtee shows it as forming one of the two polls contained in Ballyhugh townland, which is spelled Belloghea. By 1628 the two townlands had been separated. An Inquisition dated 30 September 1628 spells it as Gariathranie. The 1654 Commonwealth Survey spells it as Greaghrahen. The 1660 Books of Survey and Distribution spell it as Greaghrane. The 1661 Inquisitions spell it as Greaghrane. The 1790 Cavan Carvaghs list spells the name as Greaghrahan.

== Geography ==
Greaghrahan is bounded on the north by Cranaghan townland, on the east by Ture, Drumlane townland, on the south by Ballyhugh and Carn, Tullyhunco townlands and on the west by Aghavoher townland. Its chief geographical features are Aghavoher Lough, Dungummin Lough alias Dungimmon Lake, Killywilly Lough,

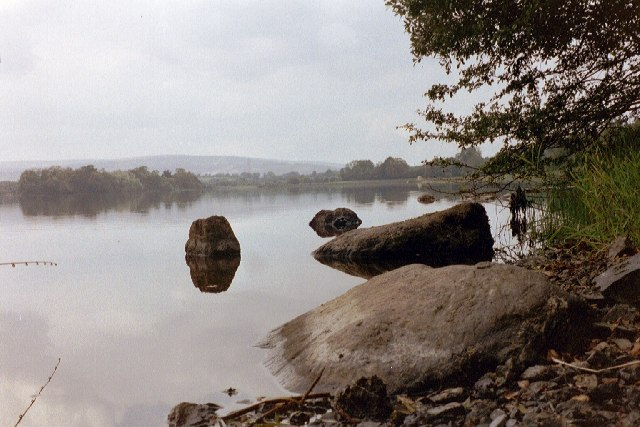
Killywilly - geograph.org.uk - 24715

which lakes contain a wide variety of coarse fish and trout, the Rag River, a rivulet, stone quarries, woods & plantations, a drumlin hill which reaches a height of 233 feet above sea-level, a spring well and a dug well. The townland is traversed by the National Secondary N87 road (Ireland), minor roads & lanes. Greaghrahan has an area of 284 acres, including 26 acres of water.

== History ==
An Ulster Plantation grant of the 'Manor of Monaghan', dated 21 June 1610, from King James VI and I to Sir Hugh Wyrral, a native of Enfield, Essex, England, included the two polls of Bellaghea. Prior to 1628 Edward Bagshaw was the occupier of Gariathranie, containing 30 acres. On 2 December 1628 the Manor of Monaghan, including Greaghrahan, was re-granted to the said Sir Edward Bagshawe of Finglas, who then renamed the estate as Castle Bagshaw. Bagshaw's daughter, Anne, married Thomas Richardson of Dublin, son of John Richardson, bishop of Ardagh, and the marriage settlement dated 28 May 1654 transferred the estate to the married couple. The 1654 Commonwealth Survey states the proprietor of Greaghrahen was 'Mr Thomas Richardson'. On 30 April 1661 the Richardsons sold part of the estate, including one poll of Greaghrane, to Captain Ambrose Bedell of Carn, Tullyhunco, County Cavan. Bedell, by his will dated 20 June 1682 and proved in Dublin 20 October 1683, devised, inter alia his lands in Creaghrahen, first to his nephew James Bedell and his heirs male; and failing such to his nephew Ambrose Bedell (James Bedell's next brother) and his heirs male; and, failing such, to his (the testator's) heirs next in blood to his father William Bedell, late Lord Bishop of Kilmore.

The Tithe Applotment Books for 1833 list forty-nine tithepayers in the townland.

The Greaghrahan Valuation Office Field books are available for October 1838.

Griffith's Valuation of 1857 lists twenty-three occupiers in the townland.

The 1938 Dúchas Folklore collection from Greaghrahan school relates treasure stories about Dungimmon Lake and other folklore.

== Greaghrahan National School ==
This was opened in 1871 to replace a previous school in Kilnaglare townland. The site at Greaghrahan crossroads was provided by Mrs Ellen McCaffrey. The school had two rooms which contained a series of long wooden desks with blackboards on easels at each end. It also had a teacher’s desk and a large map of Ireland. Heating was provided by open fires with the fuel supplied by parents. The children learned English and Irish reading, Spellings, Poetry, History, Geography and Catechism.

The Reports from the Commissioners of National Education in Ireland give the following figures for Greaghrahan School, Roll No. 5759-

1874: There were two Roman Catholic teachers, who received total salaries of £38 per annum. There were 149 pupils, 83 boys and 66 girls.

1890: There were 132 pupils.

The school was closed on 31 May 1961 and turned into a private residence. It was replaced by a new one in Ture townland which retained the same name as the old school.

== Census ==
| Year | Population | Males | Females | Total Houses | Uninhabited |
|---|---|---|---|---|---|
| 1841 | 173 | 84 | 89 | 36 | 0 |
| 1851 | 90 | 44 | 46 | 23 | 3 |
| 1861 | 78 | 36 | 42 | 17 | 0 |
| 1871 | 52 | 23 | 29 | 14 | 0 |
| 1881 | 51 | 27 | 24 | 13 | 1 |
| 1891 | 61 | 30 | 31 | 11 | 1 |

In the 1901 census of Ireland, there were eleven families listed in the townland.

In the 1911 census of Ireland, there were twelve families listed in the townland.

In 1995 there were sixteen families in the townland.

== Antiquities ==
1. A Late Bronze Age socketed axe, 'Class 11 B' dating from c.800 BC. Found on the shore of Killywilly Lough in 1935 when water levels were lowered as a result of drainage operations on the Rag River. Now in National Museum of Ireland, Dublin, reference 1935:175.
2. Cranaghan Bridge
3. A lime-kiln
4. A foot-stick over a rivulet
