= Carn, Tullyhunco =

Townland in Carn, County Cavan, Ireland

Carn (Irish derived place name, Carn meaning 'A cairn of stones or a burial-mound'.) is a townland in the civil parish of Kildallan, barony of Tullyhunco, County Cavan, Ireland.

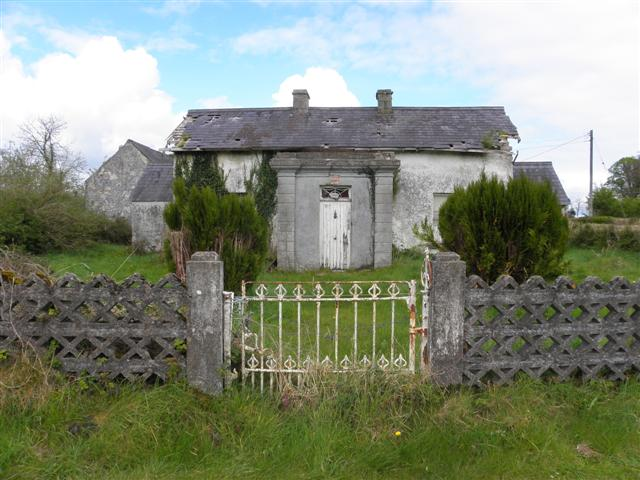
Carn Lodge

== Geography ==
Carn is bounded on the north by Ballyhugh and Greaghrahan townlands, on the west by Aghavoher, Breandrum, Tullyhunco and Killygreagh townlands, on the south by Kildallan townland and on the east by Kilnacross and Listiernan townlands. Its chief geographical features are Carn Lough, small streams and a wood. Carn is traversed by minor public roads and rural lanes. The townland covers 228 acres.

== History ==
The townland was occupied from prehistoric times as is evident from the megalithic structure therein. From medieval times up to the early 1600s, the land belonged to the McKiernan Clan. Their lands were divided into units called a ballybetagh. A survey conducted in 1608 stated that one of these was named Ballencharne containing 14 polls or townlands, which was centered on Carn townland. The chief of the McKiernans in 1290 was Sithric Carrach in Cairn Mág Tighearnán and his nickname indicates he lived in Carn before he was made chief. On 30 April 1604 King James VI and I granted a pardon to Daniel McKernan of Carne, for fighting against the King's forces.

The 1609 Plantation of Ulster Map depicts the townland as split into two sub-divisions-Tughtreagh and Cortonny. A grant of 1610 spells the names as Tagheagh and Carrotouny. A lease of 1611 spells the names as Tutreagh and Carontonie. An inquisition of 1629 spells the names as Tooterenigh and Carrotoney. The 1652 Commonwealth Survey spells it as Carne.

In the Plantation of Ulster the townland was confiscated from the McKiernans and King James VI and I by grant dated 27 June 1610, granted the Manor of Keylagh, which included one poll in each of Tagheagh and Carrotouny, to John Achmootie, a Scottish Groom of the Bedchamber. His brother Alexander Achmootie was granted the neighbouring Manor of Dromheada. On 16 August 1610 John Aghmootie sold his lands in Tullyhunco to James Craig. On 1 May 1611 James Craig leased, inter alia, 1 poll each of Tutreagh and Carontonie to Ferrall Oge McKernan. On 29 July 1611 Arthur Chichester, 1st Baron Chichester and others reported that-John Auchmothy and Alexander Auchmothye have not appeared at the lands awarded to them. James Craige is their deputy for five years, who has brought 4 artificers of divers sorts with their wives and families and 2 other servants. Stone raised for building a mill and trees felled, a walled house with a smith's forge built, 4 horses and mares upon the grounds with competent arms. An Inquisition held at Ballyconnell on 2 November 1629 stated that the poll of Tooterenigh contained seven sub-divisions named Laenedarragh, Moyngaroutragh, Moyngareightragh, Tawnehellan, Knockecanny, Knockedroe and Reighen and that the poll of Carrotoney contained nine sub-divisions named Lahenvoulty, Lahenvalli, Corvanekuren, Lahenderrigg, Taghermorasie, Cavangallie, Knocknegriffe, Cargeteriffe and Lyssegarren. Sir James Craig died in the siege of Croaghan Castle on 8 April 1642. His land was inherited by his brother John Craig of Craig Castle, County Cavan and of Craigston, County Leitrim, who was chief doctor to both King James I and Charles I.

The 1652 Commonwealth Survey states the owner was Lewis Craig but this was incorrect as at some date between 1626 and 1640 Martin Baxter purchased Carn from Sir James Craig. Martin Baxter was the first Protestant rector of Kildallan parish. He held the post from 1 November 1626 until March 1642 when he died of pestilential fever at Sir James Craig's besieged castle at Croaghan, Killeshandra. In a deposition dated 22 September 1642 about the Irish Rebellion of 1641 in Cavan, Martin Baxter's son, William Baxter, stated, inter alia- William Baxter late of Rathmoran in the halfe Barony of Clankelly and County of ffarmannagh, gent, eldest sonne and heire apparent of Martin Baxter late of Carndallan in the County of Cavan, Clarke deceased: being duily sworne and examined, deposeth & saith that on the 23 day of October last, this deponent's said father was lawfully possessed as in his owne right as of his owne proper goods of and in six-score head of Catle in the mannour of Armagh on the lands of Rathmoran in the County of ffarmannagh worth £180, of 20 horses and mares worth £40, of howsehould Stuffe at Rathmoran aforsaid worth £10, of Corne sowne worth £100, of corne in the hagyard at Rathmoran aforsaid worth £30, of debts & areares of rent in the said County due from such as are in rebellion or robbed by the Rebells and unable to make satisfacteon £48... This deponent further saith that his said father was robbed and dispoiled in the County of Cavan by the Rebells, his neghbours at and of the land of the Carne of househould goods to the value of £40, corne in the Hagyard £100, horses worth £25, Cowes worth £30, but the names and number of the rebells that soe robbed him he knoweth not, for that he, this deponent, hearing of theyr approch before, they came to the Carne aforesaid fledd away. This deponent further saith that his father's bookes being worth about £40 were carried to the house of Denish o Shraiden, minister Clerke in the said Countie where hee feareth they will be lost, and never recovered out of that Rebellious County, and that hee this deponent left in the County of Cavan at the house of James Gray of the said towne of Cauan at such time as this deponent with others bee plate which hee had made up in the cariages of one that came out of the said Castle but turned backe worth 10 s. This deponent further saith that their was taken from his unckele, John Warren of Belturbet, as he was comming towards Dublin neare the Cavan, cloath stuffe and wearing apparrell belonging to this deponent and his sister worth £10 soe that his whole certayne losses in the County of Cauan susteyned amounteth to £280. 10 s. in both Counties to £1048 verily feareth he shall susteyne to £583-10s. in all in that county to £197 of his uncertayne losses which he besides his losse of the rent of his lands till a peace be settled and which will not then answer to neare the value that it stands him in. Local tradition states that during the siege, the McKiernans ran barefooted from Croghan to Carn for a secret store of weapons.

About the year 1640, Ambrose Bedell, the youngest son of William Bedell, the Anglican Bishop of Kilmore from 1629 to 1642, being then twenty two-years of age, married Mary, only daughter of Peter Hill, Sheriff of Down, and his wife the sister of Randall, first Earl of Antrim. Peter Hill was the eldest son of Sir Moyses Hill, the second son of Sir Moyses being Arthur of Hillsborough, the ancestor of the Marquis of Downshire, and of the late Viscount Dungannon. Mary, the only daughter of Sir Moyses, was the wife of Sir James Craig, of Croghan Castle, near Kilmore. On the occasion of Ambrose's marriage, his father bought part of the lands of Carne from the Rev. Martin Baxter, Vicar of Kildallan, for the use of Ambrose and Mary his wife during their lives, and for the heirs of their bodies and right heirs of Ambrose Bedell for ever. Bishop Bedell in his will dated 15 February 1640 stated, inter alia,- I give and bequeath to my sonne Ambrose Bedell, the annuitie which I purchased of Sir James Craig of fourtie pound per annum issuing out of the lands of Carne which were lately purchased to his use and out of the lands holden by Ralph Lowharret to have and hold to the sayd Ambrose and his heyres for ever. On 26 October 1642 the aforesaid Ambrose Bedell made a deposition about the Cavan rebels in the Irish Rebellion of 1641. After this Ambrose Bedell served in the Royal Army in Ireland as a captain in the regiment of his wife's uncle Colonel Arthur Hill, until 1649. He was thus one of the "Forty-nine Officers". On 30 April 1661 Ambrose Bedell bought adjoining lands from Thomas Richardson. In the Hearth Money Rolls compiled on 29 September 1663 there were four Hearth Tax payers in Carne- Ambrose Bedell, Tirlagh Brady, Hugh O Roddan and David Ellis. Bedell had four hearths, which indicated a large house, while the rest had one hearth each. Ambrose Bedell was the High Sheriff of Cavan in 1668. In 1682, having first made his will, Capt. Ambrose Bedell went to London to be touched for the King's Evil or scrofula, as appears by a letter from Archbishop Francis Marsh, of Dublin, previously Bishop of Kilmore, to Archbishop Sancroft of Canterbury, dated August 12, 1682- Recommending Capt. Ambrose Bedell to his Grace's assistance to get him touched by the King; Capt. A. Bedell being, observes His Grace of Dublin, grievously afflicted with the evil. In the letter from Capt. Ambrose Bedell to the Archbishop of Canterbury (Tanner Collection xxxv. 121) dated November 1, 1682, given in the preface, he speaks as if his health had been fully restored, and returns humble and hearty thanks to his Grace. However, the King's touch notwithstanding, Captain Ambrose Bedell died the following year, 1683, at Cavan, aged sixty-five. Ambrose Bedell, appears to have had a child or children before his father's death, but they were dead before him, as he left no issue. In his will, dated June 20, 1682, and proved in Dublin October 20, 1683, Captain Ambrose Bedell directed that he should be buried in the churchyard of Kilmore beside his father. He devised his lands in Carne and Listiernan, Dromheriffe and Uragh, Killerolyn with the two mills, Antner, Ardue, Clony, Clonachatige, and Greaghrahen, first to his nephew James Bedell and his heirs male; and failing such to his nephew Ambrose Bedell (James Bedell's next brother) and his heirs male; and, failing such, to his (the testator's) heirs next in blood to his father William, late Lord Bishop of Kilmore.

John Faris of Carn was a witness in a bribery case relating to the Irish Parliament election of October 1783.

The 1790 Cavan Carvaghs list spells the townland name as Carne.

Ambrose Leet's 1814 Directory spells the name as Carn.

The 1825 Tithe Applotment Books list six tithepayers in the townland.

The Carn Valuation Office books are available for 1838.

Griffith's Valuation of 1857 lists thirteen landholders in the townland.

In the 19th century Carn was mostly owned by Captain Bedel Stanford, a descendant of the aforesaid Ambrose Bedell. The Stanford Estate papers are in the National Archives of Ireland.

== Census ==
Year	Population	Males	Females	Total Houses	Uninhabited
1841	81	38	43	14	0
1851	59	27	32	9	0
1861	41	17	24	10	1
1871	50	27	23	8	0
1881	34	17	17	8	0
1891	42	21	21	8	0

In the 1901 census of Ireland, there are fourteen families listed in the townland.

In the 1911 census of Ireland, there are fourteen families listed in the townland.

== Antiquities ==
1. An earthen enclosure. It is described in the ‘Archaeological Survey of County Cavan’ as- Situated on a knoll at the bottom of the NW-facing slope of a N-S drumlin ridge. This is a raised subcircular, grass-covered platform (dims of top 46.7m N-S; 41m E-W) that slope down slightly from E to S and W. It is defined by scarps (Wth 4.8-5.2m normally to 7m at E; H 1.2-1.3m normally to 1.8m at E), with slight traces of a berm (Wth 2m) at the base of the scarp at E. There is no visible bank, fosse or entrance, although the perimeter is poorly defined ESE-SSE (L 18m) and an entrance may have been at this point. It is clearly visible on Bing images (2013).
2. An earthen enclosure. It is described in the ‘Archaeological Survey of County Cavan’ as- Located in improved pasture on top of a natural hillock, which is nestled in a low-lying landscape with higher drumlins all around NE-S-NW, and Carn Lough is c. 240m to the N. The interior of the stepped barrow (CV014-061001-) slopes down slightly to the N and there is an enclosure inside the perimeter at S. This is a penannular area (dims c. 12m E-W; c. 11.5m N-S) defined by a slight scarp ENE-SE (Wth 2.2m; H 0.05m) and SW-WNW (Wth 1.9m; H 0.3m), but the perimeter is incorporated into that of the platform SE-SW and is absent elsewhere.
3. A megalithic Passage grave. It is described in the ‘Archaeological Survey of County Cavan’ (Site No. 18) as- Situated on the summit of a ridge and with commanding views in all directions. A large, round cairn, some 3m high, is much denuded and greatly disturbed by field fences. Richardson, writing c. 1739, (quoted by Paterson, Gaffikin and Davies 1938), recorded the name of the site as 'Carn Dallan' and claimed that a passage was discovered in the cairn 'about twenty-five years ago' and that 'severall urns, 5 large skulls and a great deal of burnt bones' were found in one of three 'apartments' there. This account would suggest that the cairn may have covered a passage tomb. Richardson also noted, just S of the cairn, a square enclosure about twenty yards across bounded by 'large stones set deep in the ground', and 'in the circuit of the hill . . . four small plots of ground of a circular figure inclosed with large stones, all of which are old burial places.' These have not been located. (Paterson, Gaffikin and Davies 1938, 143-5). In 1739 Dean John Richardson (the rector of Annagh Parish, County Cavan 1709–1747) stated- In the Parish of Killdallan there is a carn or heap of stones, 142 yards in circumference, on the top of a high hill about 2 furlongs distant from the church northward. The land on which it stands (belonging to John Stanford of Belturbet Esq.) seems to have lost its ancient name, for it hath from time out of mind been called Carn Dallan, from Dallan, a Dane of great note who lived here. On the north side are the remains of a rampart of a semicircular figure joyning to it, and on the south side the remains of another. What was the use of the ramparts and of the ground contained within them I cannot learn from tradition. The passage into this monument was found out about twenty-five years ago (c. 1714), by a man who had occasion to remove some stones on the north side, came to a broad flag that covered the mouth of it in the quarter there, and three of its apartments, in one of which there are severall urns, 5 large skulls and a great deal of burnt bones. Near the carn to the south there is a piece of ground about 20 yards square enclosed with large stones set deep in the ground, a yard off one smaller, and in the circuit of the hill there are four small plots of ground of a circular figure inclosed with large stones, all of which are old burial places. John O'Donovan writing in the Ordnance Survey Memoirs of 1835 states- There is a large carn of stones 150 links in diameter, with subterraneous chambers or caves beneath. Owen Connellan wrote the following note in his 1846 edition of the Annals of the Four Masters under the year 1470- It is supposed that Conall Cernach was buried on the hill now called Carn Hill, in the adjoining parish of Kildallon, and the great heap of stones or carn there, erected over him as a sepulchre. However Connellan seems to have confused the burial place with the carn in Killarah townland, where local tradition states that the Ulaid hero Conall Cernach is buried there.
4. An earthen rath. It is described in the ‘Archaeological Survey of County Cavan’ (Site No. 290) as- Raised circular area (int. diam. 49m) enclosed by two substantial earthen banks with wide, deep intermediate fosse. Outer bank has been levelled from ESE-S-W and has been replaced by a low modern field boundary. Break in bank with accompanying causeway at ESE represents original entrance. Corresponding breaks in the banks with accompanying causeway at NW may represent a second original entrance.
5. A stepped barrow or tumulus. It is described in the ‘Archaeological Survey of County Cavan’ as- Located in improved pasture on top of a natural hillock, which is nestled in a low-lying landscape with higher drumlins all around NE-S-NW, and Carn Lough is c. 240m to the N. It is visible on the OSi series of aerial photographs (2005) and on Bing images (c. 2013), and it was first noticed by Katherine McCormack. This is a circular area (diam. 40m N-S; 37m E-W) defined by a steep scarp (at W: Wth 4.4m; H 1.25m) with a berm (at W: Wth 3m) separating it from a scarp or natural slope (at W: Wth 7.0m; H 1.4m) SW-W-NNW. The perimeter declines to low scarp (Wth 4.0m; H 0.8m) NNW-SE and merges into a natural scarped slope (Wth 17.9m; H 3.4m) SE-SW. There are ramp entrances at N (Wth 3.2m) and at NNE (Wth 3.5m), which are c. 4m apart, and there are traces of a fosse (Wth of top 5.75m; Wth of base 1.25m; D 0.1m) NW-NE. The interior slopes down slightly to the N and there is an enclosure inside the perimeter at S. This is a penannular area (dims c. 12m E-W; c. 11.5m N-S) defined by a slight scarp ENE-SE (Wth 2.2m; H 0.05m) and SW-WNW (Wth 1.9m; H 0.3m), but the perimeter is incorporated into that of the platform SE-SW and is absent elsewhere.
6. 8th century cloak pins and other objects found in a coffin in Carn by William Benison of Carn House, c.1792. They are described and depicted by Daniel Grose, a nephew of Francis Grose in his book, 'A Supplement to the Antiquities of Ireland', pages 133–135.
7. Carn 19th century Hedge school
8. Carn House, the home of the Benison family.
9. Carn Cottage. Built c. 1800. The home of General Clifford.
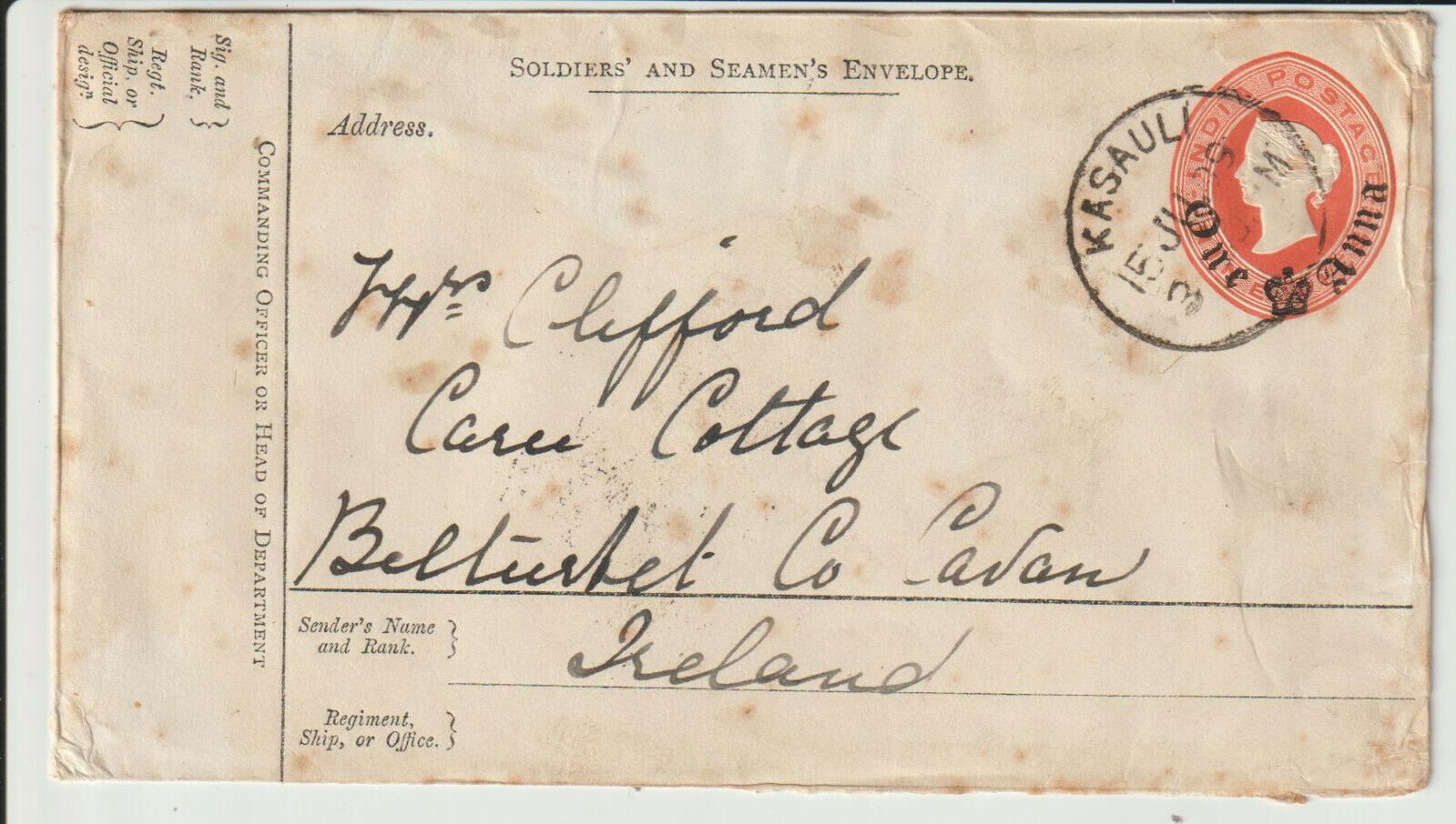
  Soldier's letter to Mrs Clifford, Carn Cottage. 1899
10. Tunnel. The Dúchas folklore collection of 1938 states that a tunnel was found connecting Carn with the megalithic passage tomb in the adjoining townland of Ballyhugh- From these graves, a subterranean passage can be traced in a southerly direction, and it is told locally that men, working in General Clifford's land, in the adjoining townland of Carn, came upon a tunnel, which is probably a continuation of the passage above mentioned.
11. Carn Lodge. Built c. 1820.
12. Cast-iron pump. Erected c.1880.
