= In Codice Ratio =

OCR research project

In Codice Ratio is a research project designed to study and use novel techniques such as Optical Character Recognition and Artificial Intelligence to digitize works in the Vatican Apostolic Archive, most of which is handwritten.

== History ==
In 2017, a project based in Roma Tre University called In Codice Ratio began using artificial intelligence and optical character recognition to attempt to transcribe more documents from the archives. While character-recognition software is adept at reading typed text, the cramped and many-serifed style of medieval handwriting makes distinguishing individual characters difficult for the software. Many individual letters of the alphabet are often confused by human readers of medieval handwriting, let alone a computer program. The team behind In Codice Ratio tried to solve this problem by developing a machine-learning software that could parse this handwriting. Their program eventually achieved 96% accuracy in parsing this type of text.
