= Kildallan (townland) =

Townland in County Cavan, Ireland

Kildallan (from Irish Cill Dalláin, meaning 'church of Dallán Forgaill ') is a townland in the civil parish of Kildallan, barony of Tullyhunco, County Cavan, Ireland.

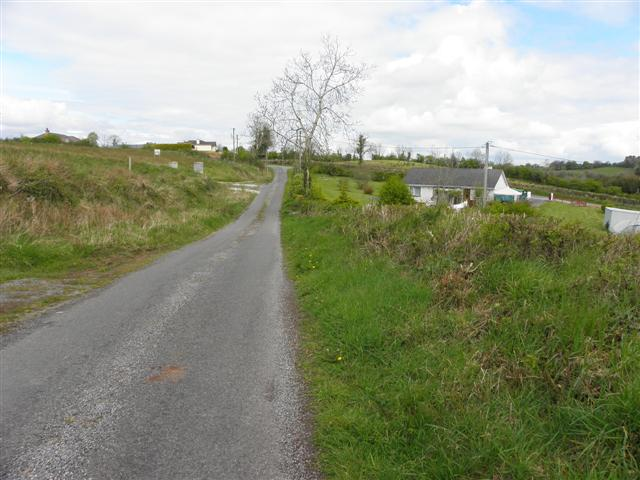
Road at Kildallan (geograph 2915652)

== Geography ==
Kildallan is bounded on the north by Carn, Tullyhunco and Killygreagh townlands, on the west by Ardlougher and Dring townlands, on the south by Claragh and Clonkeen townlands and on the east by Bocade Glebe and Listiernan townlands. Its chief geographical features are Kildallan Hill which reaches a height of 370 feet, small streams, a gravel pit, a spring well and dug wells. Kildallan is traversed by minor public roads and rural lanes. The townland covers 398 acres.

== Etymology ==
The earliest surviving reference to the name is for the year 1475 in the 'Calendar of Papal Registers Relating To Great Britain and Ireland: Volume 13, 1471-1484', where it is spelled Kylldallan. Another mention is in the Life of Saint Máedóc of Ferns complied 1536, where it is spelled as Cill Dalláin. An Inquisition of 1588 spells it as Kildallon. An Inquisition of 1590 spells it as Kildallan. A grant of 1595 spells it as Kildallon. A grant of 1603 spells it as Kildallon. A grant of 1605 spells it as Killdallane. A grant of 1607 spells it as Killadallan. A survey of 1608 spells the name as Killdallan. The 1609 Plantation of Ulster Map depicts it as Keildallan. A grant of 1610 spells the name as Killdallen. A lease of 1612 spells it as Kildallan. A grant of 1627 spells the name as Kildallon. A lease of 1639 spells it as Killdallan. The 1641 Depositions spell the name as Kildallan, Killdallen and Kildallen. John Colgan's 1645 book Acta Sanctorum Hiberniae, under 29 January, spells the name as Ecclesia Killdallanensi and Kill-Dallain. The 1652 Commonwealth Survey spells it as Kildollan. The 1665 Down Survey map depicts it as Kildallan Tirmin. William Petty's map of 1685 depicts it as Killdallon Termin.

== History ==
=== Early history ===
Kildallan townland was the site of the earliest Christian church in the parish of Kildallan and the parish took its name from the townland. The church was traditionally founded by the Ollamh Érenn or Chief Poet of Ireland, Dallán Forgaill at the end of the 6th century. Kildallan townland formed part of the church lands belonging to the Church and so its history belongs to the ecclesiastical history of the parish. It would have been owned by the parish priest and the erenach family rather than the local McKiernan chief. In medieval times the parish priest was entitled to one-third of the parish tithes and two-thirds went to Drumlane Abbey. The vicarage was worth 3 marks per annum. The 'Calendar of Papal Registers Relating To Great Britain and Ireland: Volume 13, 1471-1484', on 18 November 1475 states-

To the archdeacon of Kilmore, Nemeas Odrom (O’Drum), a canon of the same, and the official of the same. Mandate, as below. The pope has been informed by Bernard Offayrchellaic (O’Farrelly), priest of the diocese of Kilmore, that John Machiarnan (McKiernan), perpetual vicar of the parish church of Kylldallan in the said diocese, has, after being suspended from divine [offices], celebrated mass and [other] divine offices in contempt [of the Keys], and has taken part therein, thereby contracting irregularity, and has committed perjury. The pope, therefore, hereby orders the above three, if Bernard will accuse John before them, to summon the latter, and if they find the foregoing to be true, to deprive and remove him, and in that event to collate and assign the said vicarage, value 3 marks sterling, to Bernard. Vite etc. (At the end: N. xii. Pridie Id. Decembris anno quinto. Garilliati.) [22/3 pp.].

The Life of Saint Máedóc of Ferns complied 1536, (Section 229), states-

Maedoc sent a messenger in haste to Cill Dalláin to fetch Dallan Forgall to be witness to his (testamentary) disposition and will in respect of his relics and high insignia,- and to the binding of his tribute and dues on the battalion of Aed Finn and on other families besides; for this man Dallan was a poet, a prophet, and a true saint; and moreover he was a favourite and faithful ally, a companion and friend of Maedoc, to say nothing of their relationship to one another, for Dallan and Maedoc were children of two brothers; to wit, Maedoc son of Setna, son of Erc and Dallan son of Colla, son of Erc. For these reasons Dallan came at the summons of the heavenly intensely devout saint, and elect compassionate cleric, to Rossinver where Maedoc was, and was with him for some time while he made known his disposition and will, and divided his bells and fair bachalls, and his glorious wonder-working relics, among his churches and chief cells, and further finally made known to Dallan the tribute due to him from (various) races, just as he had related and told to Ultan of Ardbreckan, who made a poetical explanation of it, in order to compose and adorn (the account of) it at the bidding of the patron and high saint and virgin bishop, for the man Ultan was a prophet and a poet.

Section 246 states-

Dallan bade farewell to Maedoc on the spot, and proceeded to his own place, Cill Dalláin and was there till the end of the year approached of which Maedoc had spoken to him. And he was waiting for a reliable message to be brought to him from the true saint. Maedoc sent a hasty message to Dallan, and to all the saints and other patriarchs who were not on the spot, that they should come together in view of the death of the true saint and righteous man. They therefore gathered and assembled from every quarter in which they were, and came to Maedoc at Rossinver. When they came together, Maedoc was preparing himself to meet his death.

The church had two different rights, one was ownership of the church lands (both termon lands and the site of the church and graveyard) and the other was ownership of the church tithes (also called the rectorial tithes or the rectory) which were a tenth of all the produce of the parish not owned by the church. These rights were often owned by different people and so had a different history, as set out below.

Church Lands

An Inquisition held in Cavan Town on 20 June 1588 valued the total vicarage of Kildallon at £7.

An Inquisition held in Cavan Town on 19 September 1590 found the termon lands of Kildallan to consist of two cartrons of land at a yearly value of 2 shillings.

On 8 June 1595 Queen Elizabeth I of England granted to Edmond Barret, inter alia, Two pulls of land of every kind belonging to the termon or hospital of Kildallon, in the County of Cavan, commonly called the Hospital Lands.

King James VI and I seized the lands in Kildallan townland belonging to the erenach of Kildallan, Sloghie O'Shanaghan, who had been attainted and on 7 November 1603, the King granted a lease for 21 years of, inter alia, The fearme of the termon of Kildallon containing twoe pooles of land to Sir Thomas Ash of Trim, County Meath.

By grant dated 6 March 1605, along with other lands, Killdallane was leased for 21 years at an annual rent of 5 shillings to Sir Garret Moore, 1st Viscount Moore.

By grant dated 10 August 1607, along with other lands, King James VI and I granted a lease of the lands of Killadallan containing 2 pulls for 21 years at an annual rent of £0-6s-6d to the aforesaid Sir Garret Moore, 1st Viscount Moore of Mellifont Abbey, County Louth.

A survey conducted in 1608 stated that the ecclesiastical land of Killdallan contained 2 polls lying neere the parish church of Killdallan. The rectory is appropriate to the abbay of Dromlaghan and there is a vicar endowed. The Inquisition then granted the lands to the Protestant Bishop of Kilmore.

By a deed dated 6 April 1612, Robert Draper, the Anglican Bishop of Kilmore and Ardagh granted a joint lease of 60 years over the termons or herenachs of, inter alia, 2 polls in Kildallan to Oliver Lambart, 1st Lord Lambart, Baron of Cavan, of Kilbeggan, County Westmeath and Sir Garret Moore, 1st Viscount Moore, of Mellifont Abbey, County Louth.

The first Protestant minister of Kildallan was Martin Baxter who was appointed on 10 August 1618. The Roman Catholic church was renovated and modified for Protestant worship and the present Church of Ireland is still on the same site.

By deed dated 17 July 1639, William Bedell, the Anglican Bishop of Kilmore, extended the above lease of 2 pooles in Killdallan to Oliver Lambert's son, Charles Lambart, 1st Earl of Cavan.

The 1652 Commonwealth Survey states the owner was the Lord of Cavan (i.e. Charles Lambart, 1st Earl of Cavan).

Rectorial Tithes

The rectorial tithes were split between the local parish priest who received 1/3 and Drumlane Abbey which received 2/3, from medieval times until they were seized in the Dissolution of the Monasteries.

An Inquisition held in Cavan town on 25 September 1609 stated that

The bishop of Kilmore was entitled to an annual rent of one mark from the two polls of the termon of Kildallan and that there are two ballybetaghs and fifteen polls in the parish of Kildalan and that the parsonage thereof is impropriate to the abbey of Drumlahan and the vicarage is collative and the tithes are paid in kind, one third part to the vicar and the other two third part were paid to Drumlahan but now belong to the bishop of Kilmore. The vicar has also to pay the bishop three shillings four pence proxies.

On 9 March 1669 King Charles II of England granted to James Long alias Layng, incumbent of Killdallan alias Killdallon, Co. Cavan, the rectory and impropriate tythes of the said parish, forever.

== 17th century ==
At Cavan, on 26 July 1642, Thomas and William Jones gave the names of rebel leaders in the Cavan Irish Rebellion of 1641, including Pattrick Brady of Killdallen, Hugh Brady of same and James Brady of same. At Cavan on 21 June 1643, Henry Baxter gave the name of a rebel leader as Hugh Brady of kildallon. Edward Cooper and his brother John, both of Kildallon, were robbed by Hugh Brady of the parish of Kildallon of the County of Cauan & Brian mc Carnan & Cormock Brady & Knoghor mc Anaboigh of the same parish. On 6 April 1643, William Reynolds of Lisanover, Templeport, stated he was robbed by Edmund mc Kernon of the Parrish of Kildallon gent & Edmund his sonn, & William another of his sonns.

In the Hearth Money Rolls compiled on 29 September 1663 there were three Hearth Tax payers in Kildallan- Patrick Brady, Hugh Brady and Cormuck Brady.

In 1680 the trial for forgery of Robert Young, curate of Kildallan, took place.

=== 18th century to date ===
The Vestry Book of Kildallan Anglican Church is still in existence and dates from the early 1700s.

The 1790 Cavan Carvaghs list spells the townland name as Kildallan.

The 1825 Tithe Applotment Books (which spell it as Killdallen) list twenty four tithepayers in the townland.

In 1832 two people in Killdallen were registered as a keeper of weapons- John Huggins who had two guns and one pistol and John Magaman who had one pistol.

The Kildallan Valuation Office Field books are available for April & July 1838.

Griffith's Valuation of 1857 lists thirty-three landholders in the townland.

Folklore about Kildallan is contained in the 1937 Dúchas collection

== Census ==
Year	Population	Males	Females	Total Houses	Uninhabited
1841	233	121	112	42	5
1851	154	81	73	35	4
1861	137	73	64	30	3
1871	105	53	52	23	2
1881	84	43	41	19	2
1891	59	37	22	18	3

In the 1901 census of Ireland, there were twenty-seven families listed in the townland.

In the 1911 census of Ireland, there were twenty families listed in the townland.

== Antiquities ==
1. Kildallan Church of Ireland, built c.1750 on the site of the old Roman Catholic church.
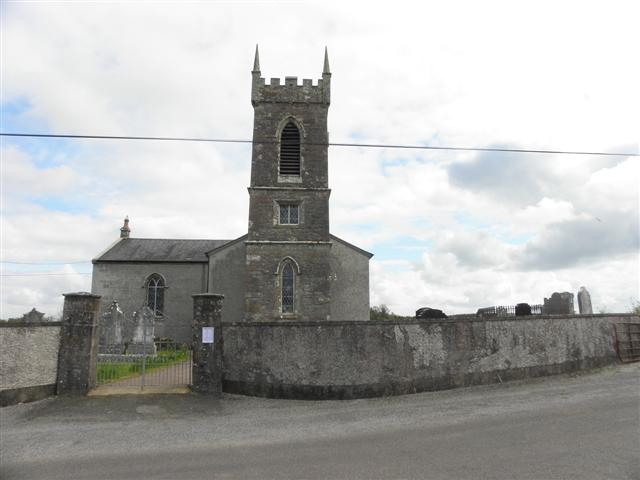
  Kildallan Church of Ireland (geograph 2915642)
2. The Relig Graveyard. The Archaeological Survey of County Cavan states- Marked on all OS eds. Circular graveyard (int. dims. 35m NNW-SSE; 30.4m ENE-WSW) enclosed by a bank of earth and stone with modern external trench. The outer face of the bank has been modified and incorporated into the field boundary. Entrance at ESE through iron gate held on 18th-century octagonal stone gateposts, with stone walling on either side. The earliest identifiable gravestone dates to 1763. A cross-inscribed stone recorded by Davies (The churches of County Cavan, in The Journal of the Royal Society of Antiquaries of Ireland, Ser. 7, Vol. XVIII, p. 97, 1948) and reused as a headstone, may have originally functioned as the lintel of a doorway. In 1739 Dean John Richardson (the rector of Annagh Parish, County Cavan 1709–1747) stated- On the lands of Kildallan adjoyning to Carn Dallan, there is a cemetery with large stones in which some of the Irish do still bury their dead, though the church and churchyard are not 150 yards distant from it.
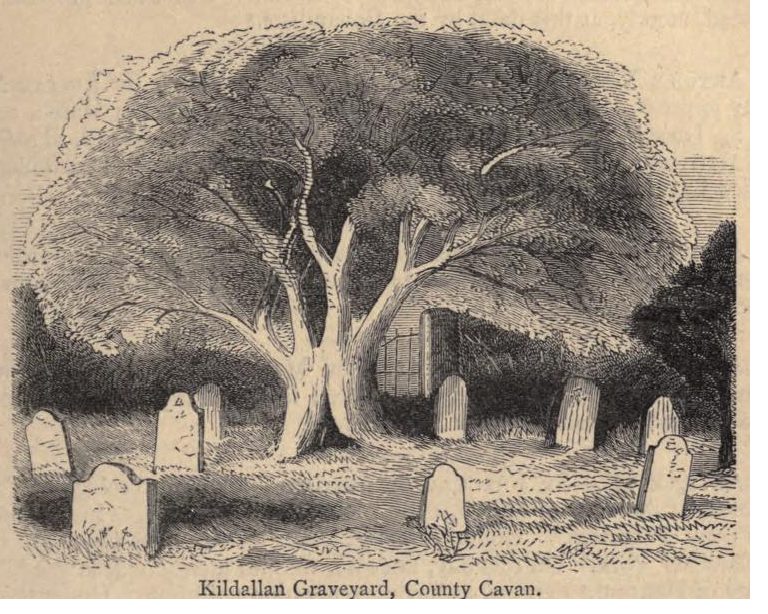
  The Relig graveyard, Kildallan townland, County Cavan drawn in 1880.
3. Kildallan Parish School. In 1826 the headmaster was a Protestant, Thomas Vies. It was described as a stone and limestone building valued at £40. The local Church of Ireland rector contributed £2 per annum towards its upkeep. In 1842 the school was mixed and had 184 pupils, 104 boys and 80 girls. In 1854 the school was split into Kildallan Boys' School which had 49 pupils, (Roll Number 1141) and Kildallan Girls' School which had 51 pupils, (Roll Number 5699). In 1862 the headmaster of the boys school was George H. Gwynne, a Roman Catholic and there were 60 male pupils, of which 55 were Roman Catholic, 3 Church of Ireland and 2 Presbyterian. In 1862 the headmistress of the girls school was Ellen Rudden, a Roman Catholic and there were 58 female pupils, 47 were Roman Catholic and 11 were Church of Ireland. In 1874 the boys' school had 84 pupils and the girl' school had 70 pupils. In 1890 the boys' school had 104 pupils.
4. Kildallan House.
5. Bronze sword. The Proceedings of the Royal Irish Academy, 1861-1864 state-
  I beg to present to the Academy, on the part of Lord Farnham, a very perfect and elegantly formed antique bronze sword-blade, of the leaf-shape pattern, 23.75 inches long, and 1.75 inches broad in the widest portion of the blade, with four thorough and three imperfect rivet holes in the handle, which is 4 inches in length. It was found in the townland and parish of Kildallan, barony of Tullyhunco, county of Cavan, and is one of the finest specimens of this description of weapon now in the Academy's collection. Also, from the same locality, two antique iron spurs, with angular rowel stems. A bronze ring-brooch, with decorations of an early character, similar to those on mortuary urns of the pagan period, and having a stud for a jewel or enamel on each side of the pivot on which the pin plays. The ring, which is complete, measures 2.25 inches in diameter, and the acus is 6.5 inches long. It also was found in Kildallan.
