= Ballyhugh =

Townland (land unit) in County Cavan, Ireland

- Townland
- Location in Ireland
- Coordinates: 54°04′57″N 7°32′16″W
- Country: Ireland
- County: County Cavan
- Parish: Drumlane

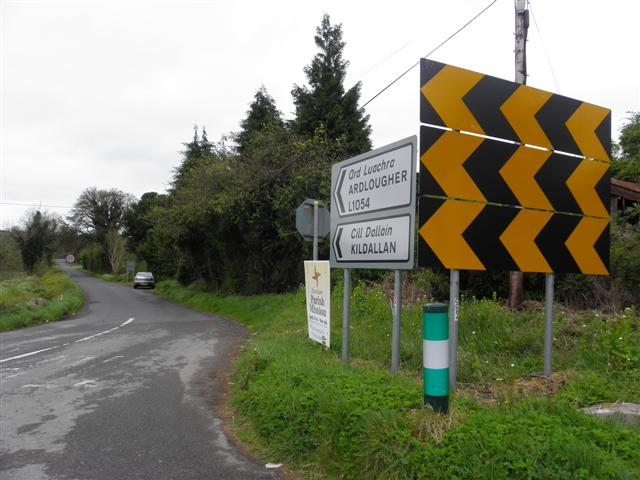
L1054, Ballyhugh (geograph 2925583)

Ballyhugh is a townland in the civil parish of Drumlane, Barony of Loughtee Lower, County Cavan, Ireland.

== Etymology ==
The townland name is an anglicisation of a Gaelic placename, Bealach Aodha, meaning 'The Road of Hugh'. The local pronunciation is ' Balla-Hew '. There is a local tradition that the townland is named after one of the several rulers of Tyrconnell named Hugh O'Donnell, who rested there when on a plundering expedition. The Annals of Ulster for 1475 state: A great hosting was made this year by Ua Domnaill, namely, by Aedh the Red, son of Niall Ua Domnaill the Rough, to rescue Brian, son of Feidhlimidh Ua Raighilligh, from the Ua Raighilligh. And he went to Bel-atha-Conaill and peace was made by him with Ua Raighilligh then. Another plundering expedition over one hundred years later by Hugh Roe O'Donnell in 1595 is described in the Annals of the Four Masters as: They then proceeded with their preys and spoils, and pitched their camp that night in Teallach-Dunchadha. On the next day they sent marauding parties to the monastery of Cavan, to see whether they could get an advantage of the English who were quartered in it; but as they did not find any of the English about the town, they carried off every thing of value belonging to them to which they came. They marched that night to Teallach-Eachdhach, west of Bel-atha-Chonaill; and from thence they returned home, after the victory of expedition on that occasion.

The 1609 Ulster Plantation Baronial map of the Barony of Loughtee shows it forming part of two polls spelled Belloghea. The present-day townland of Greaghrahan formed part of Ballyhugh at that time but the two townlands were then separated by as early as 1628. A 1610 grant spells it as Bellaghea. An Inquisition dated 30 September 1628 spells it as Ballahea. The 1654 Commonwealth Survey spells it as Ballaghhugh. The 1660 Books of Survey and Distribution spell it as Ballaghugh. The 1661 Inquisitions spell it as Ballelaghee alias Ballaghee and Ballihue. The 1790 Cavan Carvaghs list spells the name as Ballyhugh. Ambrose Leet's 1814 Directory spells the name as Ballyhue.

== Geography ==
Ballyhugh is bounded on the north by Ture, Drumlane townland, on the east by Clonamullig and Mullaghboy townlands, on the south by Kilnacross townland and on the west by Carn, Tullyhunco and Greaghrahan townlands. Its chief geographical features are Carn Lough, Dungummin Lough alias Dungimmon Lake, which lakes contain a wide variety of coarse fish and trout, small rivulets, a gravel pit, woods & plantations, drumlin hills which reach a height of 305 feet above sea-level, a spring well and dug wells. The townland is traversed by the National Secondary N87 road (Ireland), the Local L1054 Road, minor roads, lanes & footpaths. Ballyhugh has an area of 307 acres, including 7 acres of water.

== History ==
From medieval times until 1606, the townland formed part of the lands owned by the O'Reilly clan. William Tyrrell, the brother of Richard Tyrrell of Tyrrellspass, County Westmeath, purchased Ballyhugh c.1606 from the O'Reillys. A schedule, dated 31 July 1610, of the lands William Tyrrell owned in Loughtee prior to the Ulster Plantation included: Beallachy, two poles. The Commissioners of the Plantation stated: We find that Mr William Tirrell hath had ye possession of these polls some 4 years, of some a lesse tyme without title but only by agreement with some of the natives for protection. In the Plantation of Ulster, Tyrrell swapped his lands in Ballyhugh for additional land in the barony of Tullygarvey where he lived at the time.

An Ulster Plantation grant of the 'Manor of Monaghan', dated 21 June 1610, from King James VI and I to Sir Hugh Wyrral, a native of Enfield, Essex, England, included the two polls of Bellaghea. On 2 December 1628 the Manor of Monaghan, including Ballyhugh, was re-granted to Sir Edward Bagshawe of Finglas, who then renamed the estate as Castle Bagshaw. Bagshaw's daughter, Anne, married Thomas Richardson of Dublin, son of John Richardson, bishop of Ardagh, and the marriage settlement dated 28 May 1654 transferred the estate to the married couple. The 1654 Commonwealth Survey states the proprietor of Ballaghhugh was 'Mr Thomas Richardson'. On 7 May 1661 the Richardsons sold part of the estate, including Ballihue, to Major Humphrey Perrott of Drumhome townland, Ballyhaise, County Cavan. A lease dated 10th day of April, 1777 demised lands, including Ballyhue, to James Berry for the term of 300 years. On 12 April 1850 the Berry Estate was ordered to be sold.

In the Cavan Poll Book of 1761, there were two people registered to vote in Ballyhugh in the Irish general election, 1761: Andrew Nesbitt and Alexander Pringle. They were each entitled to cast two votes. The four election candidates were Charles Coote, 1st Earl of Bellomont and Lord Newtownbutler (later Brinsley Butler, 2nd Earl of Lanesborough), both of whom were then elected Member of Parliament for Cavan County. The losing candidates were George Montgomery (MP) of Ballyconnell and Barry Maxwell, 1st Earl of Farnham. Absence from the poll book either meant a resident did not vote or, more likely, was not a freeholder entitled to vote, which would mean most of the inhabitants of Ballyhugh.

A deed by George Montgomery dated 2 September 1780 grants lands in Ture to Roseanna Patterson, widow of Ture, and Alexander Pringle of Ballyhue.

The Registry of Freeholders for County Cavan states that on 27 January 1825 there was one freeholder registered in Ballihoe: Thomas Campbell. He was a Forty-shilling freeholders holding a lease for lives from his landlord, Major Irwine.

The Tithe Applotment Books for 1833 list thirteen tithepayers in the townland.

In 1836 one person in Ballyhue was registered as a keeper of weapons: William Neal. He had two guns, two pistols, two swords and one bayonet.

The Ballyhugh Valuation Office Field books are available for November 1838.

Griffith's Valuation of 1857 lists fourteen occupiers in the townland.

John O'Hart gives a history of the Vernon family of Ballyhugh in his book, "The Irish and Anglo-Irish Landed Gentry when Cromwell Came to Ireland".

The 1938 Dúchas Folklore collection from Greaghrahan school relates treasure stories about Dungimmon Lake and other folklore.

== Census ==
Year	Population	Males	Females	Total Houses	Uninhabited
1841	103	53	50	17	0
1851	70	31	39	13	0
1861	48	29	19	9	1
1871	32	17	15	7	1
1881	28	13	15	5	0
1891	31	13	18	6	1

In the 1901 census of Ireland, there were nine families listed in the townland.

In the 1911 census of Ireland, there were six families listed in the townland.

In 1995 there were eight families in the townland.

== Antiquities ==
1. A Stone Age Neolithic double court cairn erected c.2,500 BC. Site number 9, page 3, Ballyhugh townland, in "Archaeological Inventory of County Cavan", Patrick O’Donovan, 1995, where it is described as: Court tomb. Situated just south of Dungummin Lough in pasture. The monument, a dual court tomb, is well preserved but overgrown. It is aligned roughly N-S and consists of two galleries, each divided by jambs into two chambers, set 1.1m apart in a long oval mound. A single facade-stone is visible at the N end of the mound. A broad open court gives entry to the northern gallery. The front chamber here is 4m long and 1.5m to 1.7m wide. The rear chamber is 3.5m long and narrows towards the backstone. Only two stones, which also serve as entrance jambs, remain of the southern court. The front chamber here was about 4m long but its outer end is now missing. The rear chamber is 3.5m long and also narrows towards the back, (De Valera, R. and Ó Nualláin, S., "Survey of the megalithic tombs of Ireland", Vol. 3, 1972, pp. 117-8, No. 17). One of the chambers was excavated c. 1900 by a member of the Clifford family. In 1739 Dean John Richardson of Belturbet described it as: In the valley on the north side of the carn there is a small circle of the like kind and near it a pit of 20 ft diameter which seems to have been fenced in with a dry wall of big stones. Some of the earth dug lately out of the bottom is very black and seems to have been charcoal, in the long process of time turned to earth.
2. Tunnel. The Dúchas Folklore Collection of 1938 states that a tunnel was found connecting the above Ballyhugh double court tomb with the adjoining townland of Carn- From these graves, a subterranean passage can be traced in a southerly direction, and it is told locally that men, working in General Clifford's land, in the adjoining townland of Carn, came upon a tunnel, which is probably a continuation of the passage above mentioned.
3. A rare inland Promontory fort. Site number 184, page 37, Ballyhugh townland, in "Archaeological Inventory of County Cavan", Patrick O’Donovan, 1995, where it is described as: Promontory fort. Oval-shaped promontory (dims. 71.1m N-S; 62.5m E-W) surrounded by Dungummin Lough from SSW-N-SE and elsewhere enclosed by a wide, deep, partly waterlogged fosse and substantial earthen bank. Break in bank with accompanying causeway at SSW represents original entrance. Within the enclosed area at NE is a small approximately circular depression (D 0.88m; dims. 4.6m ENE-WSW; 4.2m NNW-SSE) which may be the remains of a hut site, although Davies (ITA Survey 1942) suggested that it might represent the remains of a limekiln.
4. A medieval earthen rath. Site number 242, page 44, Ballyhugh townland, in "Archaeological Inventory of County Cavan", Patrick O’Donovan, 1995, where it is described as: Rath (site). Marked 'Fort' and depicted as a large oval enclosure on OS 1836 and 1876 eds. An earlier report 1969) described a raised circular area (int. dims.30.5m NE-SW; 29m NW-SE) enclosed by a low earthen bank and a shallow fosse. Original entrance may have been at ENE. Site has been levelled.
5. A medieval earthen rath. The government's Historic Environment Viewer website describes it as: Number CV014-063. Located on an undulating shelf towards the bottom of a W-facing slope where the ground slopes down generally to the S and W. This is an oval, grass-covered area (dims 59m NNE-SSW; c. 49m WNW-ESE) defined by a scarp (H 1m at SW to 1.5m at W) S-W-NNE, with an outer berm (Wth c. 3m; ext. H 0.8m) NNW-N that morphs into a fosse (Wth of top 7.6m; Wth of base 2.5m; int. D 0.6m; ext. H 0.3m) N-NNE, but the perimeter cannot be traced NE-S. There are slight traces of an inner bank represented by a slight scarp (Wth c. 2m; H c. 0.1m) about 15m inside the perimeter SW-SW. It is visible on Bing images (c. 2013).
6. An earthen mound. The Historic Environment Viewer website describes it as Number CV014-058.
7. Ballyhugh Post Office
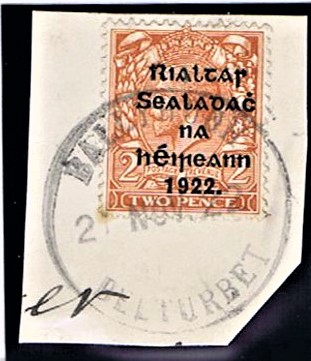
  Ballyhugh Post Office postmark 1922
8. Ballyhugh House
9. A foot-stick over a rivulet.
