= Archive of the Dicastery for the Doctrine of the Faith =

Archive of the Catholic Church In Rome

Coordinates: 41°54′3.54″N 12°27′21.82″E

The Archive of the Dicastery for the Doctrine of the Faith, commonly referred to as the Archive of the Inquisition (or more fully the Archive of the Inquisition and Index), contains the Catholic Church's documents dealing with doctrinal and theological issues related to church teaching. It also contains information on political trials that were carried out when the papacy had temporal power over the Papal States.

== Origins ==
According to most sources, the archive that is now the archive of the Dicastery for the Doctrine of the Faith was founded in the sixteenth century – most likely in 1542 when Pope Paul III first established the Roman Inquisition as a central body for Church doctrine at the beginning of the Counter-Reformation. The Index of Forbidden Books was founded in 1571. Before this, there was no centralised means for collecting Inquisition papers, and it is generally believed that all or almost all important documents have been lost or even deliberately destroyed.

Most of the documents dating from these early years have been lost due to the French Revolution and the resultant pillage of Napoleon, which it is believed caused as many as two thousand documents to be lost before the archive was returned to Rome. Those remaining, however, have considerable value covering such questions as what role the Church played in the seventeenth century witch-hunts.

== Development ==
After the archive of the Inquisition was returned to Rome in 1815, it expanded a great deal. Although the actual number of documents housed in the present archive of the Dicastery for the Doctrine of the Faith is not known because documents dated after Pope Leo XIII's death, in 1903, are still closed to researchers, there are known to be 4,500 documents available to scholars up to that point.

Over the years, there have been numerous important documents placed by various Popes in this archive. Probably the best known case is the 1944 and 1957 revelations by Fatima seer Lúcia dos Santos, but there exist numerous other documents of this type placed in the archives whose content was partially known before being placed there.

Although little precise information is known, there can be no doubt that a great many individual cases concerning doctrinal orthodoxy are dealt with very thoroughly in the archives of the Dicastery for the Doctrine of the Faith, simply because many theologians investigated by it have published some of the information within their own writings.

== Opening ==
Because hostility towards liberalism and socialism was so strong and the documents dealing with them considered very sensitive, at the time the papal files in the Vatican Secret Archives were opened by Leo XIII in 1879, that same Pope refused to allow any access to the archives either of the Inquisition or the Index of Forbidden Books. Even the pro-Papal historian Ludwig von Pastor could not use the Inquisition archive in writing his massive History of the Popes since the End of the Middle Ages. The first known case of a scholar gaining access to the Inquisition archive was ironically the fiercely anti-clerical scholar Luigi Firpo, who used his close connections with Maurilio Fossati (long-serving Archbishop of Turin) to study the trial of Giordano Bruno.

In 1979, a request was made to Pope John Paul II by historian Carlo Ginzburg, an atheist from a Jewish background, to open the Inquisition Archives. By 1991, a limited group of scholars were already allowed access to review the material in the archives.

On 22 January 1998, the Vatican opened all Inquisition archives up to the death of Leo XIII. At first, there was space for only twelve scholars within the archives, but this has been increased as demand for the use of the material has increased.

Pope Benedict XVI, formerly head of the office, described Ginzburg's letter as instrumental in the Vatican's decision to open these archives.

The fact that – whereas other open Vatican archives are now open up to the death of Pope Pius XI – documents dated from the modernist crisis under Pope Pius X have not been made available has been criticised by many liberal scholars (Hans Küng, John Cornwell). Since 1998, the Vatican has failed to issue any document stating either that post-1903 material will never be released (presumably to protect doctrinal orthodoxy) or that it may, in the future, open post-1903 Inquisition archives.

== See also ==
- Index Librorum Prohibitorum
- Index of Vatican City–related articles
- List of authors and works on the Index Librorum Prohibitorum
- Vatican Apostolic Archive
