= Aghavoher =

- Townland

Irish transcription(s)
  - Derivation: Achadh an Mhothair
  - Meaning: "field of the trees or mound"
- Aghavoher shown within Republic of Ireland
- Coordinates: 54.083°N 7.56°W
- Country: Ireland
- County: County Cavan
- Barony: Loughtee Lower
- Civil parish: Tomregan

Area
  - Total: 92 ha (228 acres)

Aghavoher (from Irish Achadh an Mhothair, meaning 'field of the trees or mound') is small a townland in the civil parish of Tomregan, County Cavan, Ireland. It is approximately 0.9 square kilometres (0.35 sq mi) in area and lies in the former barony of Loughtee Lower.

== Geography ==
Aghavoher is bounded on the north by Cranaghan townland, on the west by Clifton, County Cavan, Mullynagolman and Carrigan townlands, on the south by Breandrum, Tullyhunco townland and on the east by Greaghrahan and Carn townlands. Its chief geographical features are Aghavoher Lough and the Rag River on its northern boundary and a small hill which rises to 306 feet above sea level. Aghavoher is traversed by the Kildallan road and Carrigan lane. The townland covers 228 statute acres including eleven acres of water. The sub-divisions of the townland are Sandville and Sandybrook.

== History ==
The earliest surviving spelling of the townland name is in a printed list of Cavan townlands dated 1790 where it is spelled Aughiogher. Ambrose Leet's 1814 Directory spells the name as Augavoher with the resident being Mr. Patterson. Centuries before that the townland formed part of the Black Pig's Dyke in pre-Christian times.

Aghavoher formed part of the termon lands belonging to Tomregan Roman Catholic Church which were granted to the Church of Ireland Bishop of Kilmore in 1610 as part of the Plantation of Ulster. By a lease dated 6 April 1612 the said bishop granted the lands to Sir Oliver Lambart of Kilbeggan, County Westmeath and Sir Garret Moore, 1st Viscount Moore of Mellifont, County Louth. On 17 July 1639 the bishop re-granted the lands to Charles Lambart, 1st Earl of Cavan.

The Tithe Applotment Books for 1827 list the following tithepayers in the townland: Profet, McKiernan, Stevens, Lee, Murrey, Berry, Patterson.

A deed dated 23 February 1835 now in the Cavan Archives Service (ref P017/0043) is described as:

Deed of indemnity made between Mary Anne Patterson, Sandybrook, County Cavan, widow, devisee and an executor named in will of Alexander Patterson, late of Sandybrook, esquire, of the first part, William Rogers, junior, Cornacrum, County Cavan, gentleman, of the second part, and Joseph Denham, Killeshandra, County Cavan, gentleman, trustee, of the third part. Patterson grants to Denham the lands of Aghavoher (Aughavoher) known by the name Sandybrook, barony of Lower Loughtee, County Cavan, by virtue of lease now held by. Lands granted in order to indemnify Rogers against the payment of several legacies and annuities outlined in the will of Alexander Patterson, dated 28 February 1832.

The Ordnance Survey Name Books for 1836 give the following description of the townland:

Achadh a mothar, 'field of the cluster'. It lies in the South-East extremity of the parish. It is bounded on the North-West by Carigan and Mullynagolman. On the West by Clifden. On the North by Cranaghan. On the East by Drumlane and on the South by Kildallan. The proprietor J.C. Jones Esq and the Protestant Bishop of Kilmore. The land agent is Mr. Knipe of Belturbet. The soil is of good quality and produces wheat, oats, flax and potatoes. The houses are built of stone. Tenants have it in lots which are held by leases of years. Inhabitants in good circumstances. Held in freehold. Rent per acre is 5s/6d to the bishop and 5s to Mr. Jones. Contains Sandybrook House which is the residence of Mrs Paterson. A neat house.

The Aghavoher Valuation Office Field books are available for December 1838.

Griffith's Valuation of 1857 lists the landlords of the townland as Jones and Moore and the tenants as Berry, Winslow and Kellett.

== Census ==
Year	Population	Males	Females	Total Houses	Uninhabited
1841	42	20	22	8	1
1851	30	17	13	5	1
1861	31	17	14	4	0
1871	38	22	16	5	0
1881	26	12	14	4	0
1891	21	11	10	4	0

In the 1901 census of Ireland, there are six families listed in the townland.

In the 1911 census of Ireland, there are five families listed in the townland.

== Antiquities ==
1. A Bronze-Age ring-barrow on the border with Clifton;
2. A medieval crannóg in Aghavoher Lough;
3. Sandville House erected c.1850;
