= Sergio Pagano =

Italian archivist

His Excellency, The Most Reverend Sergio Pagano
- Prefect of Vatican Apostolic Archive; Titular Bishop of Celene
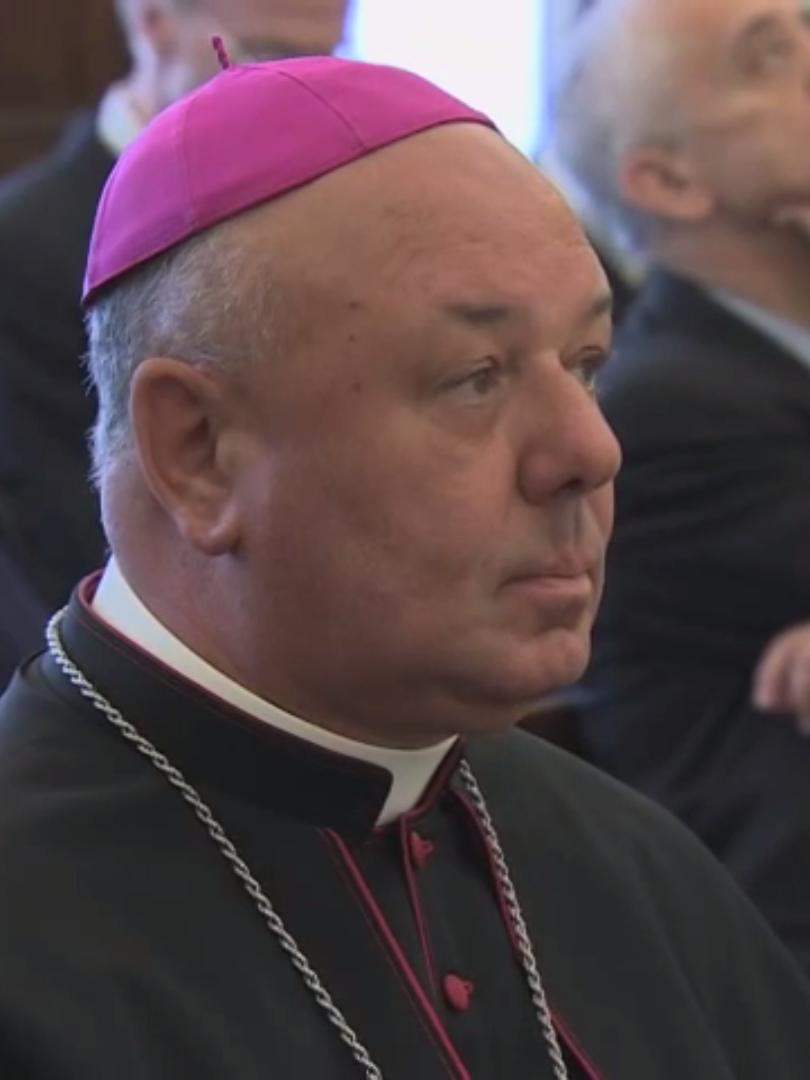
- Pagano in 2014.
- Appointed: 7 January 1997 (Prefect of the Vatican Secret Archives); 4 August 2007 (Titular Bishop of Celene)
- Successor: Incumbent

Orders
- Ordination: 28 May 1978 by Bishop Placido Maria Cambiaghi, B.
- Consecration: 29 September 2007 by Pope Benedict XVI

Personal details
- Born: Sergio Pagano; 6 November 1948 (age 78) Genoa, Italy
- Denomination: Roman Catholic
- Motto: Veritati et caritate
- Coat of arms: Sergio Pagano's coat of arms

Styles of Sergio Pagano
- Reference style: The Most Reverend
- Spoken style: His Excellency
- Religious style: Monsignor

Ordination history of Sergio Pagano
History
Episcopal consecration
- Consecrated by: Pope Benedict XVI

Sergio Pagano B (born 6 November 1948 in Genoa) is a Roman Catholic bishop and the Prefect of the Vatican Apostolic Archive.

Pagano became a member of the Congregation of the Barnabites in 1966. He completed his studies in philosophy and theology in Rome, where he was ordained priest on 28 May 1977.

== Education ==
He graduated in Theology with a specialization in Liturgy in 1978, and he obtained a Diploma as Archivist Paleographer at the Vatican School of Palaeography, Diplomatics and Archives Administration in 1978. In this same year, he was also appointed Scrittore of the Vatican Secret Archives.

== At Vatican ==
He is a Lecturer of Papal Diplomatics in the aforementioned School (where he has also been a Lecturer of Archives Administration), Academician of the S. Carlo Academy of Milan, representative of the Secret Archives at the Comité International d’Archivistique, Historical Councilor of the Congregation for the Causes of the Saints since May 1985 and Councilor of the Pontifical Commission for the Cultural Heritage of the Church since 1997.

He was appointed Vice-Prefect of the then-Vatican Secret Archives by Pope John Paul II on 30 January 1995, and a few days later he was appointed Vice-Director of the Vatican School of Palaeography, Diplomatics and Archives Administration.

From 1989 to 2001, he was Director of the Historical Studies Centre of the Barnabite Fathers of Rome. On 7 January 1997, he was appointed Prefect of the Vatican Secret Archives and Director of the Vatican School of Palaeography, Diplomatics and Archives Administration.

He is a Member by «perdurante munere» right of the Pontifical Academy of Sciences and of the Pontifical Committee for Historical Sciences. Since March 2000, he has been a Corresponding Member of Monumenta Germaniae Historica, and since July 2000, of the «Società Romana di Storia Patria».

On 18 October 2007, he was appointed Scientific Director of the Historical Archives of the Archdiocese of Lucca from 2007 to 2012. He was appointed Titular Bishop of Celene on 4 August 2007, and consecrated by Pope Benedict XVI on 29 September 2007. In December 2007, he was nominated a member of the Pontifical Commission for the Cultural Heritage of the Church.

Catholic Church titles
Preceded by Josef Metzler	Prefect of the Vatican Secret Archives; 7 January 1997 – Incumbent	Succeeded by Incumbent
