= State Paper Office =

State Paper Office may refer to

- Public Record Office, UK
- National Archives of Ireland, Republic of Ireland
