= Cranaghan =

Townland in County Cavan, Ireland

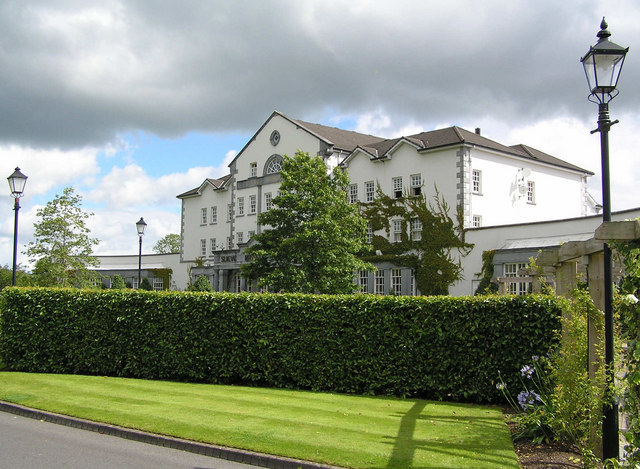
Slieve Russell Hotel and Golf Course

Cranaghan is a townland in the Parish of Tomregan, Barony of Loughtee Lower, County Cavan, Ireland.

== Etymology ==
The townland name is an anglicisation of the Gaelic placename Crannachan which means ‘Woodland’. The earliest surviving mention of the townland is on the 1609 Ulster Plantation map of the Barony of Loughtee, where it is spelled Granchinah. A 1610 grant spells it as Granchinagh. A 1627 grant spells it as Granchynagh, or Craynkyney, and Cronaghan. The 1709 Cavan Carvaghs list spells the name as Cranaghan. Ambrose Leet's 1814 Directory spells the name as Cranaghan.

== Geography ==
It is bounded on the north by Killywilly townland, on the east by Ardue, Ture, Drumlane and Greaghrahan townlands, on the south by Aghavoher and Carrigan townlands and on the west by Cavanagh (townland) and Mullaghduff townlands. Its chief geographical features are Killywilly Lough, Agavoher Lough, Lough Rud, the Rag River and several small drumlin hills reaching to an altitude of 250 feet above sea-level. Cranaghan is traversed by the N87 road (Ireland) and some minor lanes. The townland covers 492 acres, including 108 acres of water.

== History ==
In an Ulster Plantation grant of the Manor of Monaghan dated 21 June 1610 from King James I to Sir Hugh Wyrral, it was specified that the two polls of Granchinagh containing 90 acres are excepted from this grant. The reason they were excepted is that they were intended as glebe-land for the Protestant Church. On 25 January 1627 a grant was made of two poles of Granchynagh, or Craynkyney, and Cronaghan to Thomas Groves, the Rector or Vicar of the parish of Dromlaghan. Cranaghan then passed down as churchland until the 20th century.

The Tithe Applotment Books for 1827 list the following tithepayers in the townland- Kane, Reilly, Story, Green, Taylor, Brady, Dolan, McGauran, Laurence, Shewell, Corry, Ross, Gillon, McIlroy, Rooney.

In 1829 a Sunday school was kept in the townland, funded by the Hibernian Sunday School Society.

The Ordnance Survey Name Books for 1836 give the following description of the townland-Crannachan, 'wood-land'. It lies in the East of the parish. This is glebe land. The residence of the Revd J. Story is a neat building with a garden plantation. Rent is 25 shillings per arable acre. Soil is gravelly. Produce is oats, flax and potatoes. There is a large limestone quarry in the land, much used for building and agricultural purposes. Cranaghan Glebe House is the residence of Reverend Story. It has planting and a good garden. In good repair.

The Cranaghan Valuation Office Field books are available for December 1838.

Griffith's Valuation of 1857 lists thirty-eight occupiers in the townland.

In the Dúchas Folklore Collection, Mrs Reilly in 1938 relates a treasure story that occurred in Cranaghan.

== Census ==
Year	Population	Males	Females	Total Houses	Uninhabited
1841	211	94	117	39	4
1851	126	64	62	25	3
1861	116	54	62	25	1
1871	118	58	62	25	0
1881	120	56	64	24	0
1891	102	51	51	24	2

In the 1901 census of Ireland, there are twenty-eight families listed in the townland.

In the 1911 census of Ireland, there are twenty-six families listed in the townland.

== Antiquities ==
1. A prehistoric wedge tomb which was originally located in Aughrim townland but was excavated in 1992 and moved to the grounds of the Slieve Russell hotel due to quarrying operations, (Site number 7, page 2, Aughrim townland, in Archaeological Inventory of County Cavan, Patrick O’Donovan, 1995, where it is described as- Originally sited on Church Hill at the SE flank of Slieve Rushen (see CV010-005----), this tomb was excavated in 1992 in advance of quarrying operations and re-erected in the grounds of the Slieve Russell Hotel near Ballyconnell. It consists of a ruined gallery, some 6m long, aligned WSW-ENE, set in a low, round cairn, retained by a kerb. A tall stone at W, splits the entry to the gallery which seems to have been divided into a short portico and main chamber. There are buttress stones along both sides of the gallery. During the excavation both inhumed and cremated bone, in association with beaker and food-vessel pottery, were recovered from below the cairn and inside the gallery under a rough paving. Three cist burials were found at the inner edge of the kerb. (de Valera and Ó Nualláin 1972, 115-6, No. 14; Channing 1993, 4; O'Donovan 1995, 2, no. 7)). It was one of only two megalithic structures in Tomregan parish; the only one now remaining in situ is the court-cairn in Doon townland.
2. A medieval crannóg in Killywilly Lough (Site number 1515, page 181, Cranaghan townland, in Archaeological Inventory of County Cavan, Patrick O’Donovan, 1995). Among the objects found in the crannog were a bronze socketed axe.
3. An Orange Hall
4. Cranaghan Bridge.
5. Cranaghan Hedge School. Run in the early 19th century by a Roman Catholic teacher called Francis Carney in a field owned by Mr. Patterson. He taught reading, writing, arithmetic, English grammar and mensuration. The teacher was paid at Christmas each year by the schoolchildren, making £11-8s-3d per annum. It was a thatched school with three windows on one side and a door on the other. The fire fuel of turf and wood was kept in a small room off the schoolroom, each child bringing a sod of turf with them each day. There were wooden desks with inkwells. The teacher lived on his own small farm. There was a total of 129 pupils, 79 boys and 50 girls, the majority were Roman Catholic and the rest Church of Ireland. The school was supported by the London Hibernian Society and the Kildare Place Society.
6. In the 19th and early 20th centuries Cranaghan had one of the biggest lime-kiln industries in County Cavan, run by the O’Reilly family.
7. The Slieve Russell hotel and golf course now stand on the site of Cranaghan House which was the Church of Ireland rectory for Tomregan parish from 1850 to 1959.
