= Vatican Apostolic Archive =

Archive of the Holy See

- Latin: Archivum Apostolicum Vaticanum; Italian: Archivio Apostolico Vaticano
- Emblem of the Vatican Apostolic Archive

Archive overview
- Formed: 1612
- Headquarters: Cortile del Belvedere, Vatican City; 41°54′17″N 12°27′17″E
- Archive executives: Giovanni Cesare Pagazzi, Archivist and Librarian of the Holy Roman Church; Sergio Pagano, Prefect; Paolo Vian, Vice-Prefect
- Website: archivioapostolicovaticano.va

Map
- Location on a map of Vatican City

The Vatican Apostolic Archive (Latin: Archivum Apostolicum Vaticanum; Italian: Archivio Apostolico Vaticano), formerly known as the Vatican Secret Archive (Latin: Archivum Secretum Vaticanum; Italian: Archivio Segreto Vaticano), is the central repository in the Vatican City of all acts promulgated by the Holy See.

The Pope, as the sovereign of Vatican City, owns the material held in the archive until his death or resignation, with ownership passing to his successor. The archive also contains state papers, correspondence, account books, and many other documents that the church has accumulated over the centuries.

Pope Paul V separated the Secret Archive from the Vatican Library, where scholars had some very limited access, and the archive remained closed altogether to outsiders until the late 19th century, when Pope Leo XIII opened the archive to researchers, more than a thousand of whom now examine some of its documents each year.

== "Secret" name ==
The use of the word secret in the former title, "Vatican Secret Archive", does not denote the modern meaning of confidentiality. A fuller and perhaps better translation of the archive's former Latin name may be the "private Vatican Apostolic archive", indicating that its holdings are the pope's personal property, not those of any particular department of the Roman Curia or the Holy See. The word secret continues to be used in this older, original sense in the English language, in phrases such as secret servants, secret cupbearer, or secretary, much like an esteemed position of honour and regard comparable to a VIP. One study in 1969 stated that use of the term secret was merited, as the archives' cataloguing system was so inadequate that it remained "an extensive buried city, a Herculaneum inundated by the lava of time ... secret as an archeological dig is secret".

Despite the name change, parts of the archive do remain classified in the modern sense of the word secret; most of these classified materials, which are actively denied to outsiders, relate to contemporary personalities and activities, including everything dated after 1958, as well as the private records of church figures after 1922.

On 28 October 2019, Pope Francis issued an Apostolic Letter motu proprio dated 22 October, renaming the archives from the Vatican Secret Archive to the Vatican Apostolic Archive.

== History ==
=== The early Church ===
In the 1st century of Christianity, the Church had already acquired, and begun to assemble, a sizable collection of records. Known alternately as the Holy Scrinium or the Chartarium, these records normally travelled with the reigning pope.

As the Church amassed power in later centuries, popes would visit heads of state to negotiate treaties or make political appearances around Europe. Popes would also have multiple residences. When they travelled for diplomatic or other purposes, they would bring their archives, since they needed them for administrative work. This resulted in some loss of items.

Initially, the archival materials of the Church were stored at the Lateran Palace, then the official papal residence.

=== Uprisings, revolts, and the Western Schism (1085–1415) ===
By the 11th century, the archives of the Church were devolved to at least three separate sites: the Lateran, St. Peter's Basilica, and the Palatine Palace.

When the Popes moved to Avignon, the process of transporting their archives spanned a total of twenty years. The various places where the archives were kept along the way were sacked by the Ghibellines three separate times, in 1314, 1319, and 1320.

Antipopes also had their own archives. The Western Schism saw two sets of papal archives being developed simultaneously; this rose to three during the era of Pisan antipope John XXIII. The disparate archives of rival papal claimants were not fully reunited in the Vatican's archives until 1784.

During the 1405 sack of the Vatican, papal registers and historical documents were thrown into the streets, and Pope Innocent VII fled Rome with his court for Viterbo. His eventual successor, Pope Gregory XII, supposedly sold off a large number of archival materials in 1406, including some of the papal registers.

=== Founding the archive ===
In 1612, Pope Paul V ordered all Church records assembled in one place.

=== Seizure by the French government and restoration ===
As Napoleon Bonaparte conquered the states of the Italian peninsula in the 1790s, he demanded works of art and manuscripts as tribute. His armistice with Holy See on 23 June 1796 stipulated that "the Pope shall deliver to the French Republic one hundred pictures, busts, vases or statues ... and five hundred manuscripts", all chosen by French agents. The 1798 Treaty of Tolentino made even greater demands, and the works sent to Paris included the Codex Vaticanus, the oldest extant manuscript of the Bible in Greek.

By the time Napoleon became Emperor of the French in 1804, he envisaged a central archive in Paris of the records and treasures of Europe. In 1809 he ordered the entire Vatican Archive transferred to Paris, and by 1813 more than 3,000 crates had been shipped, with only modest losses. The Vatican archives were stored in the complex of the National Archives of France, on the grounds of the Hôtel de Soubise.

In April 1814, after Sixth Coalition troops entered Paris, the new French government ordered the archive returned, but provided inadequate financing. Vatican officials raised funds by selling some volumes as well as bundling documents for sale by weight. (Note: Some records are now held by the library of Trinity College, Dublin, and the Bibliothèque Nationale in Paris.) Inadequate funding led to losses en route, with one scholar of the period estimating that "about one-fourth to one-third of the archival materials that went to Paris never returned to the Vatican." (Note: Documents relating to Galileo were stolen from the Paris archive by the Comte de Blacas, Pierre Louis Jean Casimir de Blacas (1771–1839) and only returned to the Vatican by his widow, the Comtesse du Montsoreau, Henriette du Bouchet de Sourches in 1843.)

== Access to scholars ==
=== 19th-century developments ===
In 1855, Augustin Theiner, prefect of the Archive, began to publish multi-volume collections of documents from the archive. His predecessor Marino Marini had produced an account of Galileo's trials that failed to satisfy scholars who saw it as an apology for the Inquisition. Beginning in 1867, Theiner and his successor granted individual scholars access to the manuscripts relating to the trial of Galileo, leading to a protracted dispute about their authenticity. Scholarly access was briefly interrupted following the dissolution of the Papal States in 1870, when archive officials restricted access to assert their control against competing claims by the victorious Italian state.

In 1879, Pope Leo XIII appointed Cardinal Josef Hergenröther as archivist, who immediately wrote a memo recommending that historians be allowed access to the archive. Access had remained limited out of concern that Protestant researchers might use their access to slander or embarrass the Church. Hergenröther's approach led to Pope Leo ordering a reading room constructed for researchers; it opened on 1 January 1881. When the German Protestant historian Theodor von Sickel, in April 1883, published the results of his research in the archive, which defended the Church against charges of forgery, (Note: Von Sickel studied the letter in which the Holy Roman Emperor Otto the Great made grants to the papacy, the Privilegium Ottonis, a document critical to establishment of the Papal States.) Pope Leo was further persuaded. In August 1883, he wrote to the three cardinals who shared responsibility for the archives and praised the potential of historical research to clarify the role of the papacy in European culture and Italian politics. He announced that the archives would be open to research that was impartial and critical. In an address to the Görres Society in February 1884, Pope Leo said: "Go to the sources. That is why I have opened the archives to you. We are not afraid of people publishing documents out of them."

=== Access in the modern era ===
In 1979, historian Carlo Ginzburg sent a letter to the newly elected Pope John Paul II, asking that the archives of the Holy Office (the Roman Inquisition) be opened. Pope Benedict XVI said that the letter was instrumental in the Vatican's decision to open those archives.

Though the archive has developed policies that restrict access to material by pontificate, with access granted no earlier than 75 years after the end of a papal reign, some popes have granted exceptions. For example, Pope Paul VI made the records of the Second Vatican Council available not long after its conclusion. In 2002, Pope John Paul II allowed scholars access to documents from the historical archives of the Secretariat of State (Second Section) pertaining to the Holy See's relations with Germany during the pontificate of Pope Pius XI (1922–1939) in order "to put an end to unjust and thoughtless speculation" about the Church's relationship with the Nazi Party.

Following the success of the controversial 2008 film Angels & Demons, adapted from the Dan Brown novel of the same name, which depicts a visit to the Archives, the Vatican opened the Archives to a select group of journalists in 2010 to dispute the film's treatment.

In 2018, Pope Francis ordered the Vatican Archive to open documents which would assist in a "thorough study" concerning former Cardinal Theodore McCarrick, who was accused of sexually molesting seminarians and having affairs with young priests.

=== Archives of Pope Pius XII (2020) ===
Pope Francis announced on 4 March 2019 that materials relating to Pope Pius XII would be opened on 2 March 2020, stating that Pius' legacy had been "debated and even criticized (one might say with some prejudice or exaggeration)", that "The Church is not afraid of history", and that he anticipated "appropriate criticism". In addition to assessing the response of Pope Pius XII to the Holocaust, the archives of his papacy should point to a much broader shift in global Christianity from Europe to the global South. Since 2006, members of the archives department have been organising the estimated 16 million pages of documents in order to prepare them for viewing by researchers.

== Holdings ==
The Vatican Apostolic Archive has been estimated to contain 85 kilometres (53 mi) of shelving, with 35,000 volumes in the selective catalogue alone.

Complete archives of letters written by the popes, known as the papal registers, are available beginning with the papacy of Pope Innocent III (r. 1198–1216). A few registers of earlier popes also survive, including Pope John VIII (r. 872–882) and Pope Gregory VII (r. 1073–1085).

Notable documents include Henry VIII of England's request for a marriage annulment, a handwritten transcript of the trial of Galileo for heresy, and letters from Michelangelo complaining he had not been paid for work on the Sistine Chapel.

To mark the 400th anniversary of the Vatican Archives, 100 documents dating from the 8th to the 20th century were put on display from February to September 2012 in the "Lux in arcana – The Vatican Secret Archives reveals itself" exhibition held at the Capitoline Museums in Rome. They included the 1521 papal bull of excommunication of Martin Luther and a letter from Mary, Queen of Scots, written while awaiting her execution.

The archive also supports its own photographic and conservation studios.

== Access policy ==
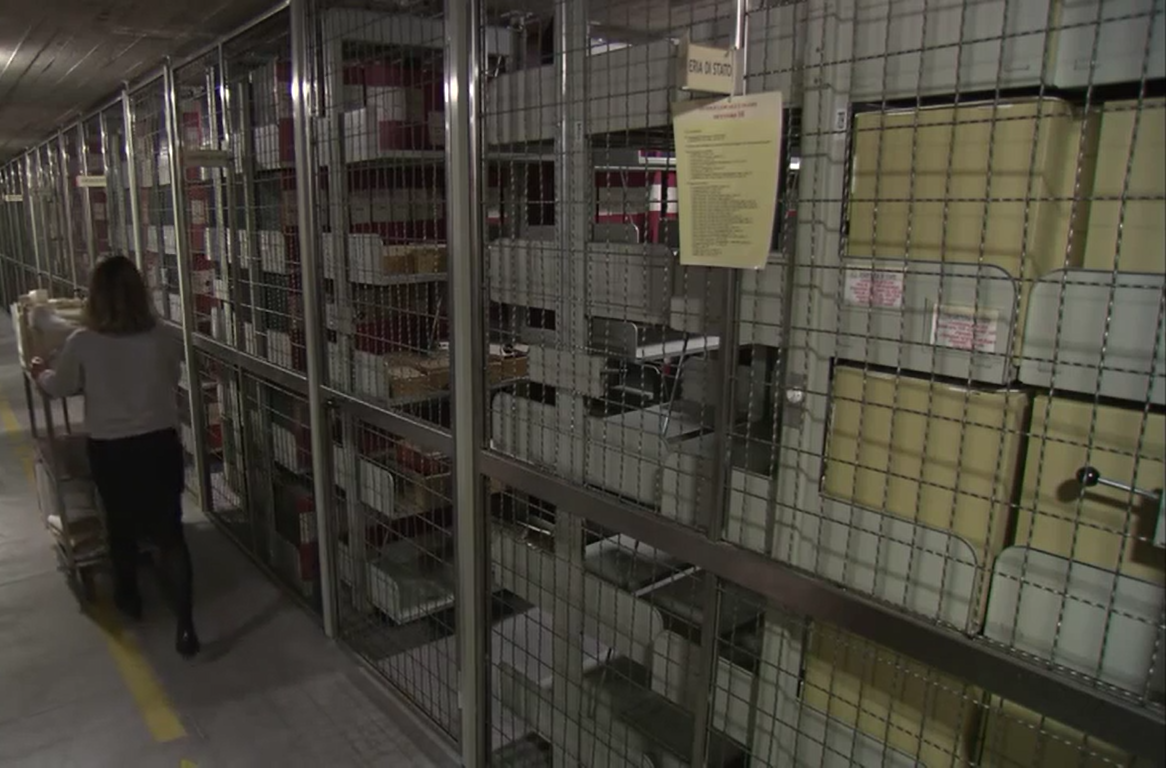
The Vatican Secret Archives (2015).

The entrance to the Archive, adjacent to the Vatican Library, is through the Porta di Santa Anna in via di Porta Angelica (Rione of Borgo). In 1980, following modern renovations, new underground storage space was added.

- Distinguished and qualified scholars from institutions of higher education pursuing scientific research with an adequate knowledge of archival research may apply for an entry card.
- Selected scholars need an introductory letter from either a recognized institute of research or a suitably qualified person in their field of historical research.
- Applicants need to provide their personal data (name, address, etc.), as well as the purpose of their research.
- Only paper, pencil and computer laptops are permitted. No ink, pens, or any digital camera photography are allowed inside.
- Only five requested articles can be taken at a time, and only sixty academicians per day are allowed inside.

With limited exceptions, materials dated after 1939 were unavailable to researchers until 2 March 2020, when material from the tenure of Pope Pius XII (1939–1958) was opened for public access.

An entire section of the distinguished archives relating to the personal affairs of Cardinalship from 1922 onwards cannot be accessed.

== Digitization project ==
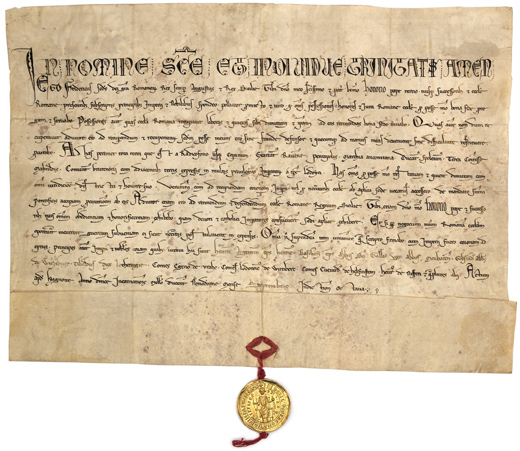
A document from the Secret Archives recording an oath sworn to Pope Honorius III by the Holy Roman Emperor Frederick II in Haguenau, September 1219. This is an example of how medieval handwriting can be difficult to read, both for modern readers and for text-recognition software.

Early in the 21st century, the Vatican Apostolic Archives began an in-house digitization project to attempt to both make the documents more available to researchers and to help to preserve ageing physical documents.

As of 2018, the archive had 180 terabytes of digital storage capacity and had digitized over seven million images.

=== In Codice Ratio ===
In 2017, a project based in Roma Tre University called In Codice Ratio began using artificial intelligence and optical character recognition to attempt to transcribe more documents from the archives. While character-recognition software is adept at reading typed text, the cramped and many-serifed style of medieval handwriting makes distinguishing individual characters difficult for the software. Many individual letters of the alphabet are often confused by human readers of medieval handwriting, let alone a computer program. The team behind In Codice Ratio tried to solve this problem by developing a machine-learning software that could parse this handwriting. Their program eventually achieved 96% accuracy in parsing this type of text.

== Other archives of the Holy See ==
There are other Holy See archives in Rome, since each department of the Roman Curia has its own archives. The word "secret" in its modern sense can be applied to some of the material kept by the Apostolic Penitentiary, when it concerns matters of the internal forum; but registers of the rescripts that it issued up to 1564 have been deposited in the Vatican Apostolic Archives and are open for consultation by qualified scholars. Half of these have already been put in digital form for easier consultation. The confidentiality of the material means that, in spite of the centuries that have passed since 1564, special rules apply to its publication.

== See also ==
- Actes et documents du Saint Siège relatifs à la Seconde Guerre Mondiale (Acts and Documents of the Holy See relative to the Second World War)
- Acta Apostolicae Sedis
- Archive of the Dicastery for the Doctrine of the Faith
- Vatican Film Library
- List of national archives
