= National Archives of Ireland =

Official state records repository

Coordinates: 53.338479°N 6.268844°W

- Chartlann Náisiúnta na hÉireann
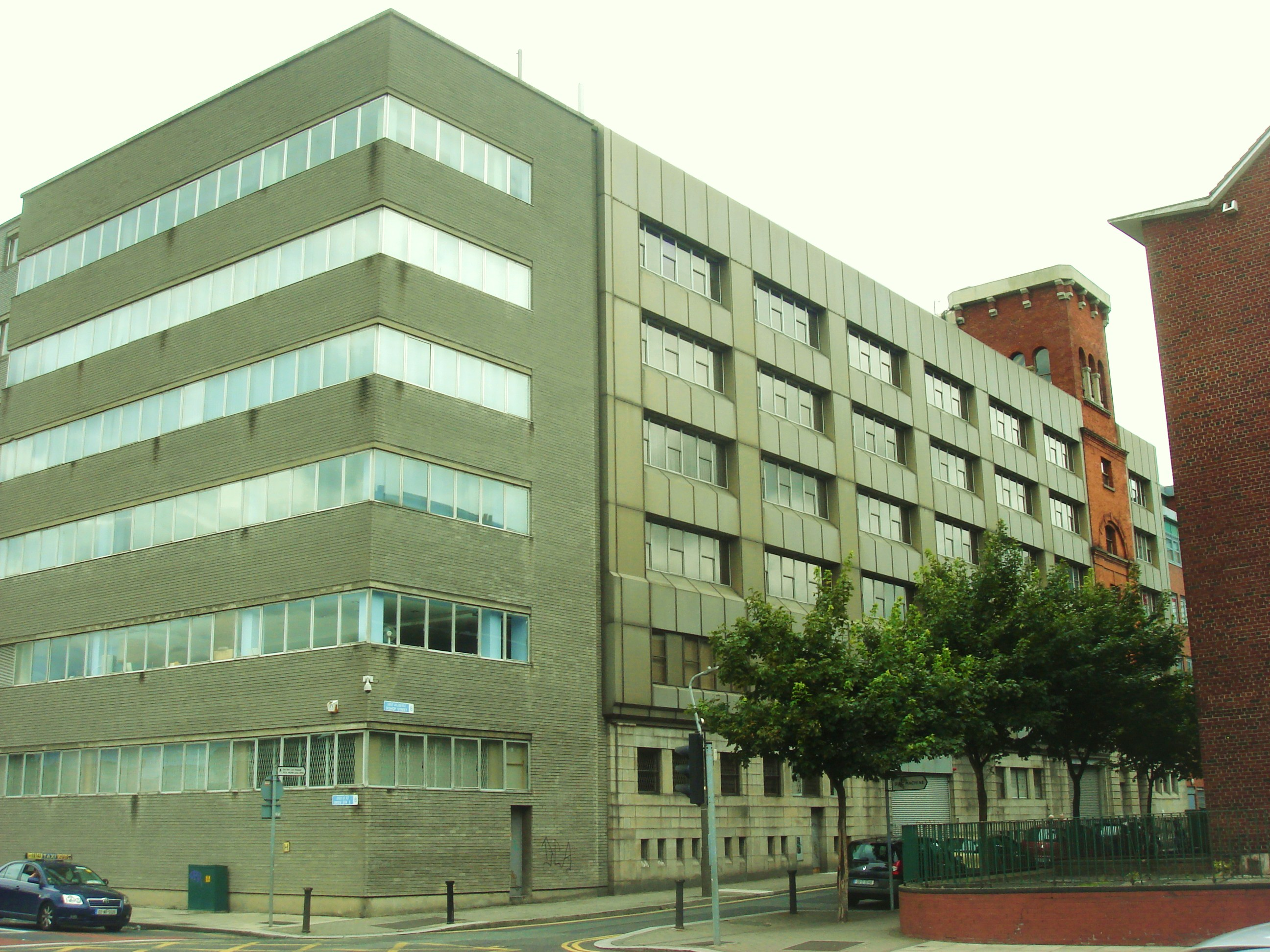
- National Archives offices on Bishop Street in Dublin

Agency overview
- Formed: 1988
- Preceding agencies: Public Record Office of Ireland; State Paper Office
- Type: National cultural institution
- Jurisdiction: Ireland, Government of Ireland
- Headquarters: Bishop Street, Dublin, Ireland
- Minister responsible: Minister for Culture, Communications and Sport
- Agency executive: Orlaith McBride, Director
- Parent department: Department of Culture, Communications and Sport
- Website: www.nationalarchives.ie

The National Archives of Ireland (Irish: Cartlann Náisiúnta na hÉireann) is the official repository for the state records of Ireland, established in 1988 under the National Archives Act 1986, taking over the functions of the State Paper Office (founded 1702) and the Public Record Office of Ireland (founded 1867). In 1991, the National Archives moved to its current premises in Bishop Street, Dublin. The Archives stand on the site of the Jacob's Factory, one of the garrisons held by rebels during the 1916 Easter Rising.

It holds records relating to all of Ireland, including documents that refer to the Republic of Ireland and Northern Ireland. The Public Record Office of Northern Ireland holds records specifically related to Northern Ireland.

== History ==
=== State Paper Office ===
Before the 18th century, any papers written by government officials in England or Ireland were considered the personal papers of those who had written them, and because of this, many records were removed by their owners upon leaving office. In 1702, during the time of the Kingdom of Ireland, the State Paper Office was established to requisition and begin collecting these government documents. These papers were most often records relating to the administrations of the various Lord Lieutenants of Ireland, who acted as the representatives of the monarch. The State Paper Office collected a range of government records, but primarily carried those relating to security, finances, trading, land ownership, and military and ecclesiastical matters. Up until 1922, during the Lordship of Ireland, the Kingdom of Ireland and finally within the United Kingdom of Great Britain and Ireland, Dublin Castle was used as a ceremonial and administrative centre as well as housing for the Lord Lieutenant of Ireland. Because of this, the State Paper Office was located in the castle, and was not moved until 1990 when the contents of the office placed in the National Archives of Ireland.

=== Public Record Office of Ireland ===
Public Records (Ireland) Act 1867 (Note: Section 1.)
- Act of Parliament
- Parliament of the United Kingdom
- Long title: An Act to provide for keeping safely the Public Records of Ireland.
- Citation: 30 & 31 Vict. c. 70
- Territorial extent: Ireland (Note: Section 2.)

Dates
- Royal assent: 12 August 1867
- Commencement: 12 August 1867 (Note: The Acts of Parliament (Commencement) Act 1793.)
- Repealed: 18 December 1953
Other legislation
Amended by	Public Records (Ireland) Act 1867 Amendment Act 1875
Repealed by	Statute Law Revision Act 1893; Statute Law Revision Act 1953

Status: Repealed

Text of statute as originally enacted

Public Records (Ireland) Act 1867 Amendment Act 1875
- Act of Parliament
- Parliament of the United Kingdom
- Long title: An Act to amend the Public Records (Ireland) Act, 1867, and to make provision for keeping safely Parochial Records in Ireland.
- Citation: 38 & 39 Vict. c. 59
- Territorial extent: Ireland

Dates
- Royal assent: 11 August 1875
- Commencement: 11 August 1875
Other legislation
Amends	Public Records (Ireland) Act 1867

Status: Current legislation

Text of statute as originally enacted

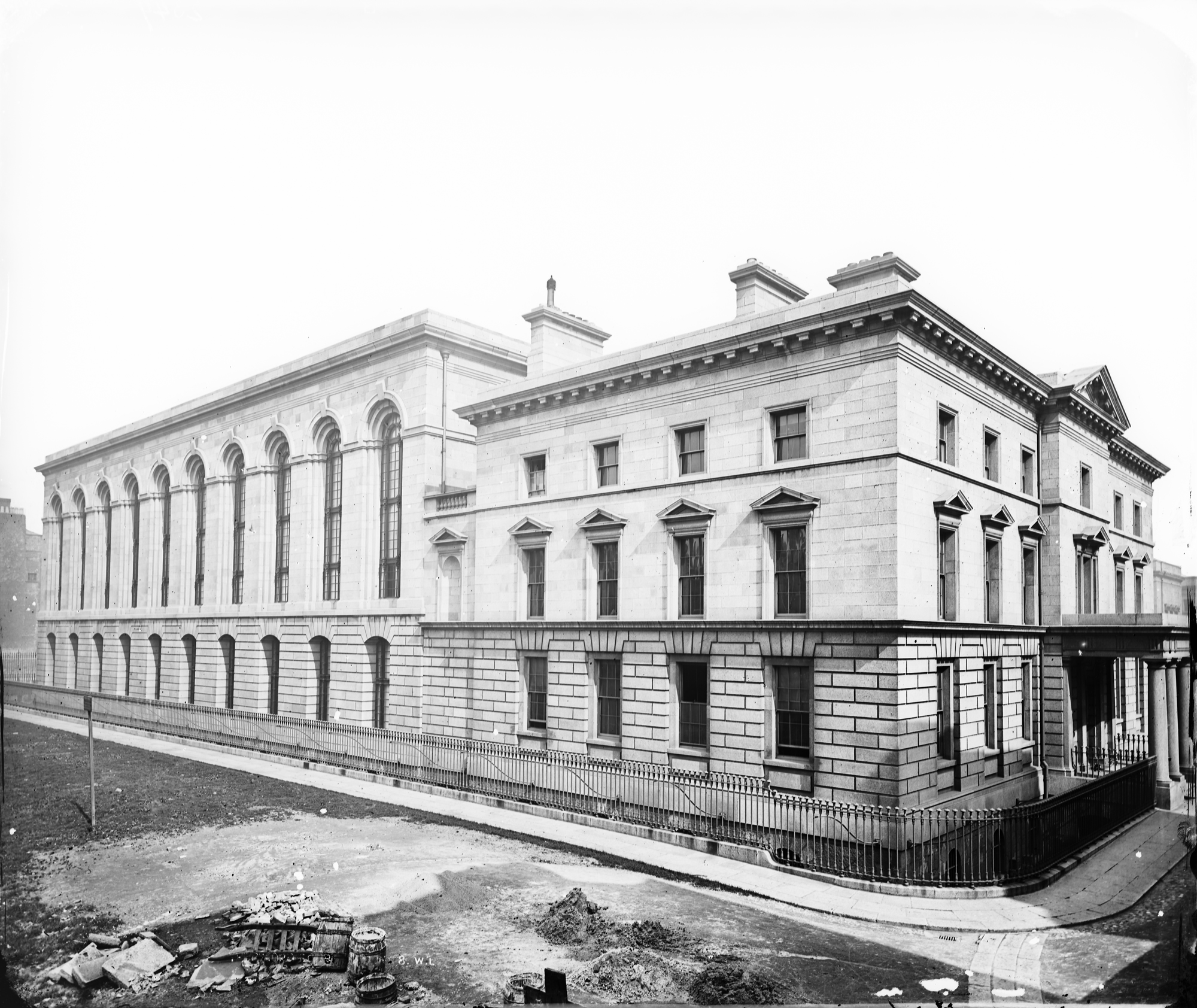
The Public Records Office of Ireland c. 1900

In 1867, the British Parliament passed the Public Records (Ireland) Act 1867 (30 & 31 Vict. c. 70) to establish the Public Record Office of Ireland which was tasked with collecting administrative, court and probate records over twenty years old. A few years later, Parliament was notified that because of the Irish Church Act 1869 (32 & 33 Vict. c. 42), records from the Church of Ireland were being kept in dangerous conditions. To extend protections to these records, and clarify issues with the Public Records (Ireland) Act 1867, they passed the Public Records (Ireland) Act 1867 Amendment Act 1875 (38 & 39 Vict. c. 59). The finished law established that a Master of the Rolls would be charged with the control and protection of the Irish records. The Master of the Rolls could issue warrants for the removal of documents from their present places of custody and place them within the records office. The Master of the Rolls or the Deputy Keeper of the Records could permit copies to be made of any of the records, and as long as the records were examined and certified by the correct personage, these copies could be used as legal documents in place of the original records.

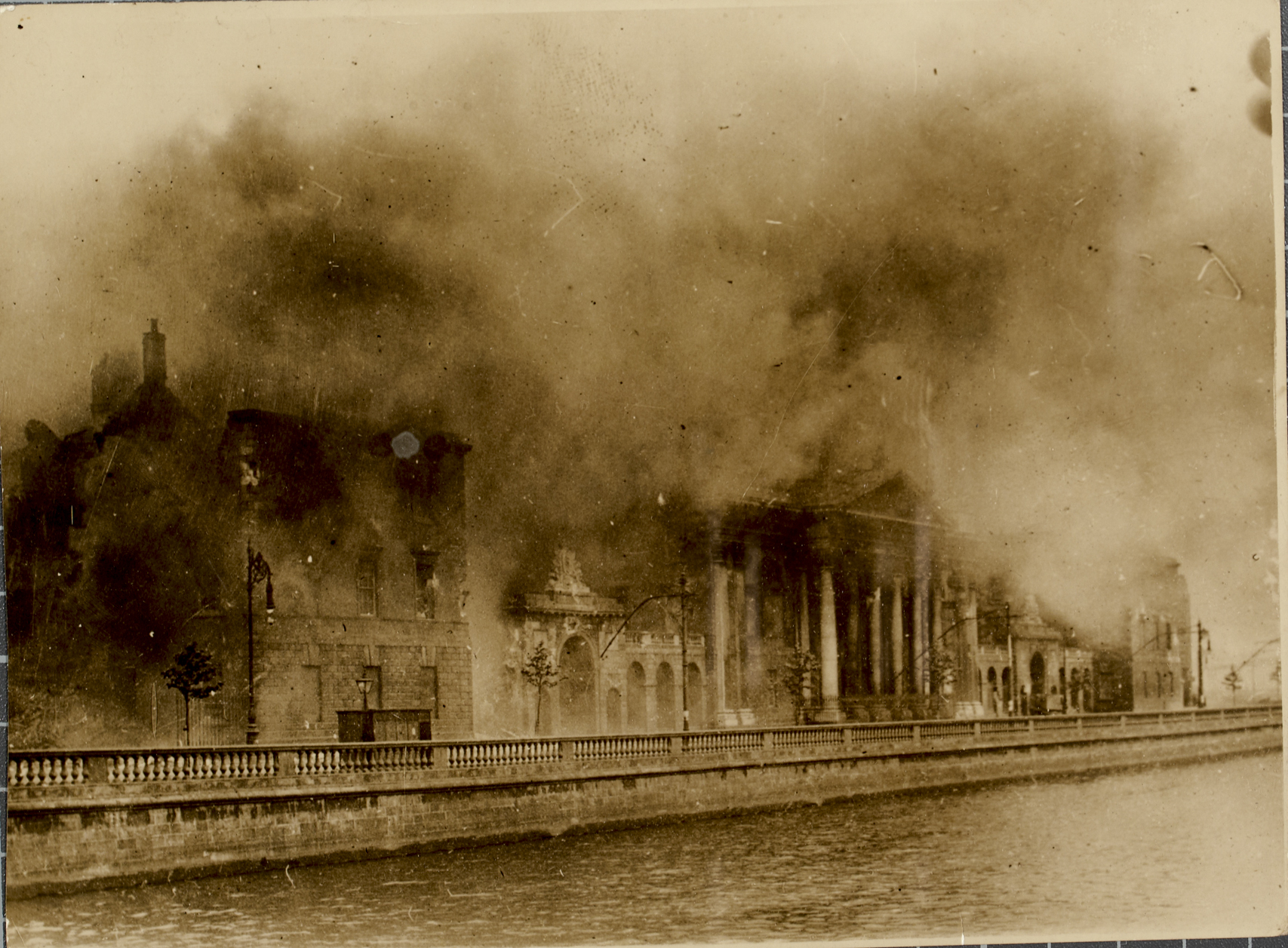
June 30 - Destruction of the PRO at the Four Courts, 1922, during the Battle of Dublin.

The Public Record Office was originally located in the Four Courts complex. In 1922, during the Battle of Dublin in the Irish Civil War, the Four Courts complex was seized and occupied by Anti-Treaty forces. Before commanding officer Ernie O'Malley surrendered at 3:30 p.m. on 30 June, a large explosion ripped through the Public Records Office. O'Malley wrote of the explosion later in his book The Singing Flame: "A thick black cloud floated up about the buildings and drifted away slowly. Fluttering up and down against the black mass were leaves of white paper; they looked like hovering white birds." The cause of the explosion was argued over until a study of the battle showed that Anti-Treaty forces had decided to use the Public Records Office as their munition block. As the battle progressed, the Free State army began shelling the Four Courts, which caused multiple fires to erupt over the complex. It was one of these fires that reached the munition stored by the Anti-Treaty forces and caused the explosion that destroyed numerous records that dated from the 13th to 19th centuries. The Public Record Office took years to rebuild, and it was not until 1928 that they were finally able to reopen.

=== National Archives Act 1986 ===
Under the National Archives Act 1986, the State Paper Office and the Public Record Office were merged to form the National Archives of Ireland. The National Archives Act 1986 repealed the Public Records (Ireland) Act 1867, Public Records (Ireland) Act 1867 Amendment Act 1875, and the Parochial Records Act 1876 (39 & 40 Vict. c. 58). This came into operation on 1 June 1988. To give the archives a new and larger space, the Government assigned it a location at Bishop Street in Dublin in 1989. The former State Paper Office was packed and moved out of their previous location at the Record Tower in Dublin Castle in August 1991, and in 1992 the Public Record Office, now the National Archives of Ireland, moved from the Four Courts to their location on Bishop Street in September 1992.

Under the National Archives Act 1986, government departments and their agencies were ordered to transfer any records that were thirty years old or over to the archives, where they could be viewed by the public. Records that have not been permitted for public inspection for over thirty years must be reviewed at least every five years following to see if they can be released for public viewing. The Act also established the National Archives Advisory Council and Director of the archives to oversee matters affecting the archives and advise the Taoiseach on any concerns relating to the archives.

== Divisions of the Archives ==
=== Archives Storage and Preservation Division ===
The Archives Storage and Preservation Division is tasked with the care and maintenance of records within the holdings of the National Archives of Ireland to ensure their long-term survival. They have been given the duties of accommodation, conservation and preservation, reprographics, document productions and returns, and disaster prevention and planning. As the National Archives Act calls for annual transfers of government records, the Archives Storage and Preservation Division manages the records space to ensure there is room for the new documents. To make sure each record is stored properly and can be easily found later, they also create and maintain databases to map out the collections. To encourage the preservation of materials, this division not only responds to the daily demands of the public for physical copied and digital material, but also works on long-term projects to create copies of original documents that can be used as surrogates in place of the original as hardcopy, digital, or microfilm formats. This process prevents constant handling, and potential damaging, of the original document, allowing it to be preserved longer for future generations.

In their role of accommodation, this division keeps a close eye on the integrity of the buildings and environments the records of the archives are stored in. This entails making sure the buildings their records are stored in are able to withstand potential catastrophic events, and if not, working to either move the holdings to a safer location or revamping the building to the best of their capabilities to make sure the records have a lower chance of being damaged. To continue the ensured safety of their collections, the Archives Storage and Preservation Division also carefully considers disaster prevention and planning. In case of disaster, there is a contingency plan in place for saving or evacuating important documents.

As one of their more daily duties, this division provides services to the public and the archival staff by removing documents from storage and returning them after use. The National Archives of Ireland uses computers to track this process to provide a reviewable trail. This allows the archives to follow up on any items that are notes as missing or damaged after they have left their placement in holding.

=== Reader Services Division ===
The Reader Service Division provides customer service to patrons both locally and externally, in person or by letter, email, fax or telephone. They will answer inquiries about the archives, records, and make reproductions of documents according to demand. They also handle publicity materials, create online exhibits, and publish social media posts relating to the archives. When a patron is using the Reading Room, the staff from this division are the archivists they will be speaking with.

=== Records Acquisition and Description Division ===
The Records Acquisition and Description Division focuses on acquiring and cataloging records for the National Archives of Ireland. They conform to the International Standard on Archival Description (ISAD(G)) for their finding aids. Due to the large amount of state records sent to the archives, this division identifies and selects records that will be of permanent value. Any records within the archives that no longer meet administrative needs or the archival preservation criteria are reviewed and disposed of within this department. While most of the material sent to the archives is paper files, a small portion of the records sent digitally are preserved by the in-house Electronic Records Unit (ERU). To ensure records under the control of the archives, and those held by Government Departments, are properly handled the Records Acquisition and Description Division provides constantly updated guidelines for the management and transferral of records.

While the archives' primary task is the management of government records, they also take records from private institutions, organizations, and individuals as donations (the ownership of the materials is transferred to the archives) or deposits (ownership of the materials stays with the depositor). The National Archives of Ireland states that they acquire private archives to "complement archives of official origin while also securing the preservation of records that document the origins and historical evolution of the Irish State, and its economic and social life." To continue their goal of preserving important documents, the archives will also accept material "in instances where there is no official place of custody in order to secure it from destruction."

=== Special Projects Division ===
The Special Projects Division works on large-scale digitization projects, partnership publication projects, and national-level policy on cultural digitization. Their largest project as of 2018 was the online digitized household returns and ancillary records for the censuses of 1901 and 1911. All thirty-two counties of Ireland for 1901 and 1911 were made searchable by numerous information categories. To complete this project, the National Archives of Ireland partnered with the Library and Archives of Canada to facilitate digitization, indexing and contextualization. According to the archives website, the online census has received hundreds of millions of hits.

The Special Projects Division works on numerous projects, some of the more recent ones which include:

- The Crowley Bequest website (a digital catalogue to the first years of one of their most important collections, the Chief Secretary's Office Registered Papers)
- The Bureau of Military History website in partnership with the Military Archives, containing searchable transcripts of the oral history of Ireland's revolutionary period
- The Tithe Applotment Book (1823–1837) images and names index put online in partnership with the Church of Jesus Christ of Latter-day Saints

== Types of records ==
=== Government records ===
The archives has acquired thousands of government records from multiple offices under the National Archives Act 1986. The types of records that can be found at the archives are:

- Agriculture, Department of, including predecessor and successor bodies
- Attorney General, Office of the
- Communications, Energy and Natural Resources, Department of
- Comptroller and Auditor General, Office of the
- Education, Department of, including predecessor and successor bodies
- Environment, Community and Local Government, Department of the
- Fair Trade Commission
- Finance, Department of
- Foreign Affairs, Department of, including predecessor and successor bodies (also includes the Secretary's Papers) – Department of Foreign Affairs records held off-site
- Gaeltacht, Roinn na, including predecessor and successor bodies
- Government Information Service
- Health, Department of, including predecessor and successor bodies
- Industry and Commerce, Department of, including predecessor and successor bodies
- Justice, Department of, including predecessor and successor bodies
- Labour Court
- National Archives
- Patents Office
- President, Office of the Secretary to the
- Registry of Friendly Societies
- Social Welfare, Department of, including predecessor and successor bodies
- Taoiseach, Department of the, including predecessor bodies (also includes the Papers of Jack Lynch, Taoiseach during the years 1966–1973 and 1977–1979)
- Transport, Department of, including predecessor and successor bodies

=== Genealogy records ===
Many visitors to the archives search for records that can assist them with researching family trees. To assist in this process, the archives has narrowed down the records that are most frequently asked for and provide the most assistance for doing genealogy research.

- Births, marriages and death
  - Any births, marriages, or deaths after January 1, 1864, can be found in the General Register Office
  - After 1922, any records of births, marriages, or deaths from the six counties of Northern Ireland (Antrim, Armagh, Down, Fermanagh, Londonderry and Tyrone) can be found at the General Register Office Northern Ireland
- Census returns
  - From 1821 to 1911 a census of the Irish population was taken every ten years
  - There are no surviving manuscripts for the years 1861, 1871, 1881 and 1891. There are only a handful of various county manuscripts for the years 1821, 1831, 1841 and 1851
  - The census returns for 1901 and 1911 are available online.
- Tithe Applotment Books
  - Books compiled between 1823 and 1837 by the Church of Ireland to calculate tithes from farmers (urban areas were not included)
- Primary (Griffith) Valuation
  - A printed book, published between 1847 and 1864, showing the people to whom land and buildings were leased to and the value of said property
- Wills and testamentary records
  - The records of wills and testamentary records will include administration papers, schedules of assets, will books, grant books, Betham's Abstracts, inland revenue registers, charitable donations and bequests, and grant book indexes.
- Soldiers’ Wills
- Ireland-Australia transportation records (1791–1853)
- Estate records
  - Estate records can contain many different types of documentation—legal documents about lands, maps or sketch plans of the property, rent rolls, correspondence letters, etc.
  - While the National Archives of Ireland holds quite a few estate records, the National Library of Ireland and in the Public Record Office of Northern Ireland hold even larger collections. Some records may be in private hands, while others are still held by estate agents or solicitors
- Private source records
  - The private collections held within the archives are primarily about members of the wealthy elite. The archives notes that these collections will most likely cover "correspondence, deeds, ledgers, legal records, maps, rentals, tenants’ agreements, testamentary material and valuations"
- Parish records and marriage licences
  - Before 1864, churches were the only organization keeping records of baptisms, marriages, and burials
  - Most original church records will still be with their relevant parishes. The National Archives of Ireland holds some copies of registers and records, however others can be found at other institutions such as the National Library of Ireland or the Public Records Office of Northern Ireland.
- Poor Law/Board of Guardian/workhouse records
