= List of places in County Fermanagh =

This is a list of cities, towns, villages and hamlets in County Fermanagh, Northern Ireland. See the list of places in Northern Ireland for places in other counties.

Towns are listed in bold.

== A ==
- Aghadrumsee
- Aghakeeran
- Aghanaglack
- Agharahan
- Arney

== B ==
- Ballinamallard
- Ballycassidy
- Bellanaleck
- Belcoo
- Belleek
- Boho
- Blaney
- Brookeborough

== C ==
- Carn
- Carrybridge
- Clabby
- Clogherbog

== D ==
- Derrygonnelly
- Derrylin
- Derryvore
- Donagh
- Drumbegger
- Drumlaghy
- Drumskinny

== E ==
- Ederney
- **Enniskillen**

== F ==
- Florencecourt

== G ==
- Garrison
- Glenkeel

== H ==
- Holywell

== I ==
- Irvinestown

== K ==
- Kesh
- Killadeas
- Killydrum
- Kilnamadoo
- Kinawley
- Knocknahunshin
- Knocks

== L ==
- Lack
- Laragh
- Letterbreen
- Lisbellaw
- Lisnarick
- Lisnaskea

== M ==
- Macken
- Magheraveely
- Maguiresbridge
- Monea
- Moylehid
- Mulleek

== N ==
- Newtownbutler

== R ==
- Reyfad
- Rosslea

== S ==
- Skea
- Springfield

== T ==
- Tamlaght
- Tattykeeran
- Teemore
- Tempo
- Trory
- Tullygerravra
- Tullyhommon

== W ==
- Wheathill

== See also ==
- List of civil parishes of County Fermanagh
- List of townlands in County Fermanagh
