= Drumbegger =

Townland in County Fermanagh, Northern Ireland

Coordinates: 54.3802°N 7.8399°W

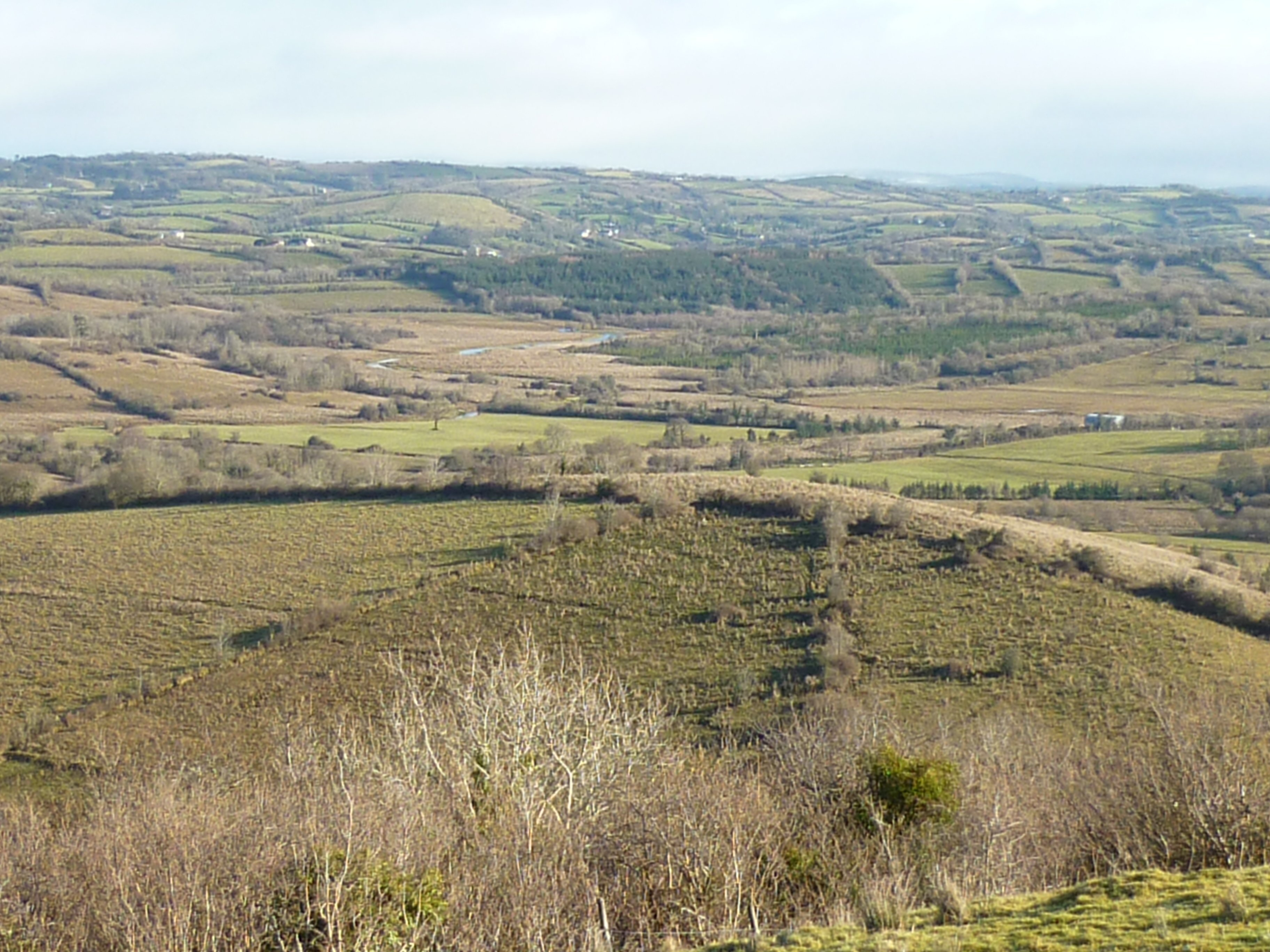
- Part of the townland of Drumbegger, County Fermanagh, with the Sillees River in the distance

- Location within Northern Ireland
- Population: (2001 Census)
- District: Fermanagh and Omagh
- County: County Fermanagh
- Country: Northern Ireland
- Sovereign state: United Kingdom
- Postcode district: BT
- Dialling code: 028, +44 28
- UK Parliament: Fermanagh and South Tyrone
- NI Assembly: Fermanagh and South Tyrone

Drumbegger (possibly from Irish Druim Beagair 'ridge of the little tillage') is a townland situated in County Fermanagh, Fermanagh and Omagh district, Northern Ireland. It is part of the civil parish of Boho in the old barony of Magheraboy and contains the sub-townland known as Oubarraghan.

This area was designated an Area of Special Scientific Interest (ASSI 322, 17 August 2009) as a consequence of species-rich wet grassland.

== Drumbegger species rich wet grassland ==
Habitats described as species rich wet grasslands are rare in Northern Ireland and are typically located in areas where traditional farming practices are still maintained. The meadows are categorised by botanists/ecologists as Fen-meadow, a specific type of purple moor-grass, rush pasture that is fed by a steady hydrological influence. The typical species found in Drumbegger are Devil’s-bit scabious (Succisa pratensis), sharp-flowered rush (Juncus acutiflorus), meadow thistle (Cirsium dissectum), lesser spearwort (Ranunculus flammula) together with mosses such as glittering wood-moss (Hylocomium splendens) and neat feather-moss (Pseudoscleropodium purum). Drumbegger is also noteworthy as a habitat for two protected species, blue-eyed-grass (Sisyrinchium bermudiana) and the marsh fritillary butterfly (Euphydryas aurinia). Marsh fritillary caterpillars thrive on two plant species found in Drumbegger which are blue-eyed-grass and Devil’s-bit scabious.

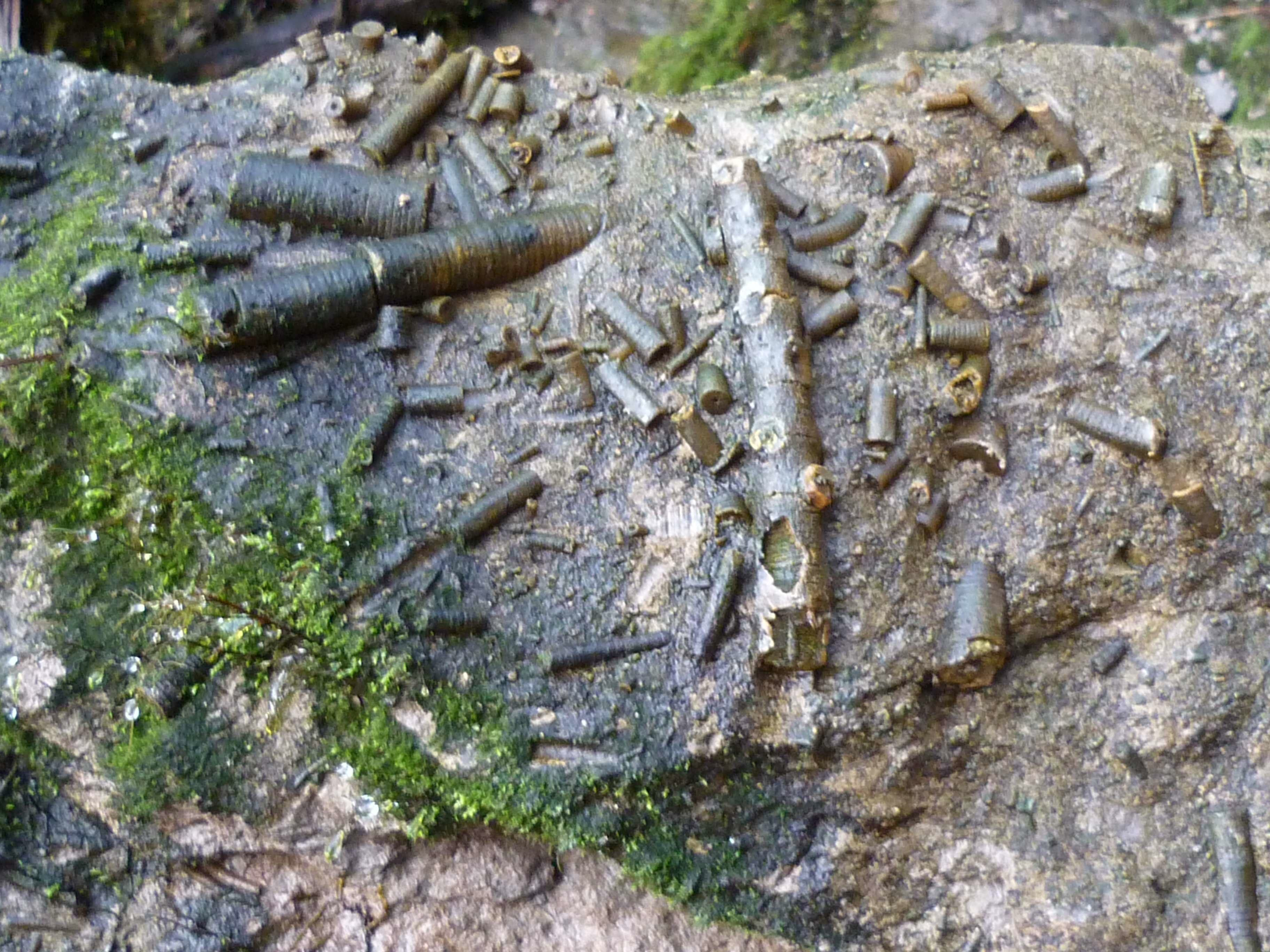
Fossil Crinoids in The Screenagh River

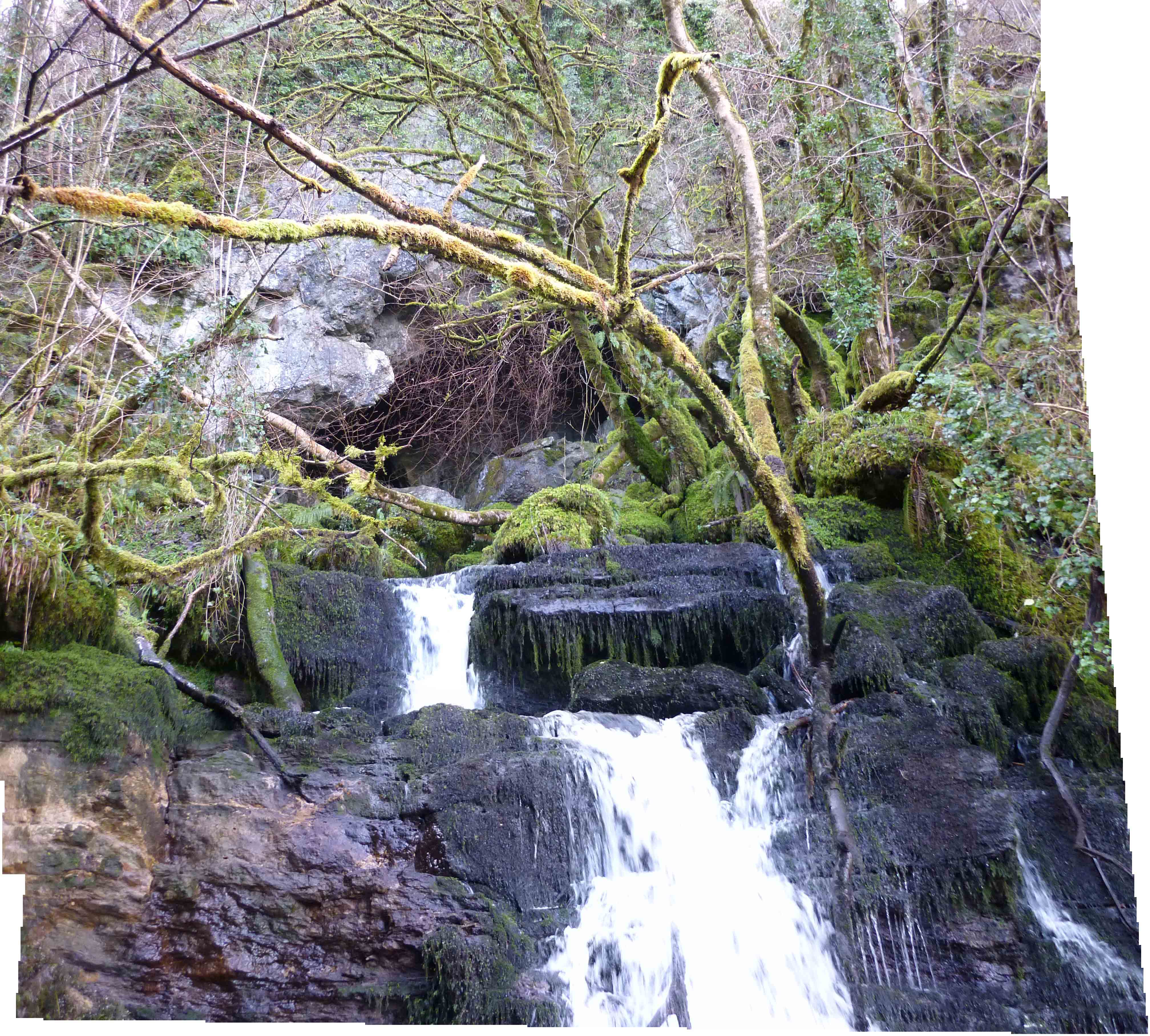
Screenagh River Waterfall emerging from the Arch Cave in Oubarraghan

== Screenagh River and Arch Cave ==
The Screenagh river enters Drumbegger from the subtownland of Oubarraghan from the Arch Cave (Grid ref: H1037 4790) which is itself an outlet of a series of subterranean passages originating from Noon's Hole. The river is a tributary of the Sillees River which feeds into Lough Erne. The waterfall and the cave were described by the famous French speleologist Édouard-Alfred Martel on 14 or 15 July 1895. On this occasion he was aided by the Enniskillen archeologist Thomas Plunkett (who had previously discovered Moylehid ring cairn in Boho) and Lyster Jameson a Dublin born naturalist. Martel correctly deduced that Noon's hole and the Arch Cave were linked by a series of underground chambers.

== See also ==
- Caves of the Tullybrack and Belmore hills
