= Boho, County Fermanagh =

Boho: Irish: Botha
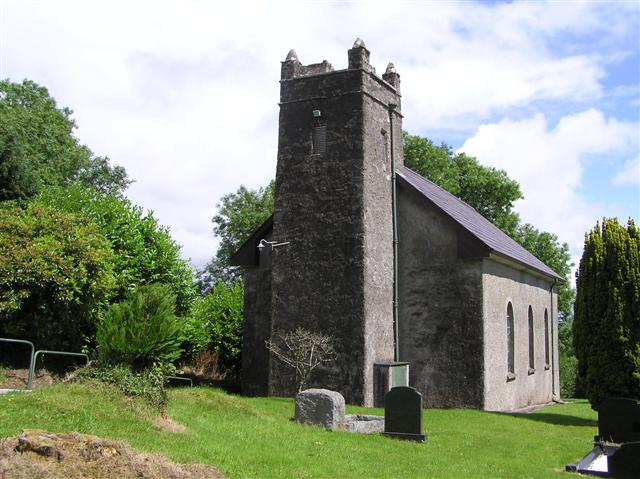
- Boho, Church of Ireland

- Location within Northern Ireland
- District: Fermanagh and Omagh
- County: County Fermanagh
- Country: Northern Ireland
- Sovereign state: United Kingdom
- Post town: ENNISKILLEN
- Postcode district: BT74
- Dialling code: 028, +44 28
- NI Assembly: Fermanagh and South Tyrone

Boho (pronounced /boʊ/ BOH, from Irish Botha, meaning 'huts') is a hamlet and a civil parish 11 kilometres (7 mi) covering approximately 12 km × 7 km (7 mi × 4 mi) southwest of Enniskillen in County Fermanagh, Northern Ireland. It is situated within Fermanagh and Omagh district.

This area contains a high density of historically significant sites stretching from the Neolithic Reyfad Stones, through the Bronze Age/Iron Age (Aghnaglack Tomb) and medieval (High Crosses) to comparatively recent historical buildings such as the Linnett Inn.

Boho parish has a high biodiversity of flora and fauna due in part to the niches offered by the limestone karst substrata combined with fen meadow, upland heath and acidic bog. The three mountains found within the parish; namely Glenkeel, Knockmore and Belmore provide a landscape varying from high craggy bluffs, with views of neighbouring counties, to low, flat bogland punctuated by streams and lakes. Below this landscape are two of the three most cave-rich mountains in Northern Ireland, featuring the deepest cave system in Ireland at Reyfad Pot, the deepest daylight shaft in Ireland at Noon's Hole, as well as popular caves for local outdoor adventure centre groups at the Boho Caves and the nearby Pollnagollum Coolarkan.

== History ==
=== Ancient origins ===
Boho is an anglicisation of the Irish Botha, which is the plural of Both, an old word for tent, hut or booth. This is a truncation of Bhotha Mhuintir Uí Fhialáin, Bothach ui fhialain in Breifney or mBothaigh I Fhialain, which translates as the huts of the Uí Fhialáin. The surname Ó Fialáin is sometimes rendered as Phelan.

This area has a long history of habitation as evidenced by the Neolithic Reyfad stones, dating from the late Stone Age/early Bronze Age (nearly 4000 years ago), classified as a scheduled monument. Further remnants of Neolithic habitation were unearthed by the Enniskillen archeologist Thomas Plunkett in 1880 when he discovered an ancient settlement 6 1/2 m (21 ft) beneath the surface of a peat bog (the coal bog) in the townland of Kilnamadoo. More neolithic remnants were unearthed in the townland of Moylehid again by Thomas Plunkett when he discovered the Eagle's Knoll Cairn passage tomb and Moylehid ring in 1894. Evidence Bronze Age habitation was discovered by George Coffey (1901), who unearthed a copper knife, currently on display in the Dublin collection. Iron Age artifacts were discovered in the Carn townland of Boho (1953), consisting of remnants of a hearth at the foot of an escarpment dating to first millennium AD. Later evidence of Danish raiders in the area came in the form of an iron spear head, found in a Cromleac in Boho, on display at the National Museum of Ireland in Dublin.

=== History ===
The inscriptions on the Neolithic Reyfad stones constitute the first markings or writings from the Boho area, however their meaning has still to be deciphered. Thousands of years later, the region covering the Boho area was inhabited by the Erdini, Ptolemy (150 AD).

In 700 AD, the two predominant tribes in the region were the Cenel Enda and Cenel Laegaire, whose boundaries followed areas similar to Clanawley, and the Magheraboy. There was a third tribe in this region known as the Fir Manach but their territory did not cover the Boho region. At this time, the barony of Clanawley extended into the north of County Cavan. Later the Boho area was considered to be in West Bréifne, also known as Bréifne Ó Ruairc.

The Boho area was mentioned in the Annals of Ulster (628 AD), in which Suibne Menn of the Cenél nEógain kindred of the northern Uí Néill, reigning High King and son of Fiachra defeated his distant cousin Domhnall, son of Aedh (Domnall mac Áedo). This event was also described in The Annals of Tigernach (630 AD) as "Cath Botha in quo Suibne Mend mac Fiachrach uictor erat, Domnoll mac Aedha fuigit". In the first part of the 9th century the area of Boho or as it was written Botha eich uaichnich, was linked to the encompassing territory known as Tuath Ratha (Tir Ratha) and also to a local patron saint St Faber in the Martyrology of Oengus the Culdee Óengus of Tallaght

The area known as Túath Rátha (from Irish Túath Rátha 'people/tribe of the fort'), is anglicised as Tooraah and later as Toora and Trory. It has also been retained as the name of the mountain Tura. Tuath-Ratha is mentioned again in 1103 in the Annals of the Loch where "a fierce conflict between the men of the Lurg and the Tuath-Ratha, in which fell a multitude on both sides". Again in 1119, it states that Cuchollchaille O'Baighellain, chief Ollamh (Ollam) of Erinn in poetry, was slain by the Feara-Luirg and by O' Flannagain of Tuath-Ratha.

The rebellion in Boho.
At one point, the people of the Boho area refused to pay annual tribute to the King of Fermanagh, Magnus MaGuidhir.
The dispute was recounted by McGuires historian as follows:

Accordingly, Maguire sent out his Bonaghs or
stewards to proceed on circuit for the tribute on his
behalf; and the Flanagan, of Toora, was the first to
refuse it, " till he saw his lord, to whom he would
give it on his feet ": and to show the guile of this
artful chief, he added with Irish blarney—"that they
would not store it more faithfully for him than
himself." With this rebel refusal the stewards seized
the cattle of Flanagan, and Flanagan pursued the
bonaghs to where we now call Glack, or Aghanaglack,
sometimes called Carn (Clais an Chairn), at Boho,
where a fight ensued for the cattle, in which many
were killed on both sides, including Flanagan and 15
of Maguire's party, and while the conflict was taking
place "the women and youngsters" of Toora took
back the cattle.

This tract is a description by O Breislin (historian to Maguire) and O'Cassidy (physician to Maguire) of a time when MaGuidhir, the King of Fermanagh was unable to collect annual tribute from the seven tuaths of Fermanagh due to three years of infirmity. The account is written some several hundred years after the event and may contain exaggerations on the generosity of the king, prophesies and connections to Irish mythologies. The account mentions the Flannagans of Toorah, the area of Boagh or Boho Both Uí Fhialain and adjacent areas controlled by Mac Giolla Fheinnéin, the chief the Muinntear Fhuadacháin, Muinntear Leannáin, the church termoners for the parish of Inis Mhuighe Samh (Inismacasaint) and O Fialáin and Clann Mhe Garacháin associated with the Both Uí Fhialáin.
Magnus MaGuidhir sent his bonaghs (representatives) to collect annual tribute from the southern edge of his dominion, namely O' Flannagáin's territory in Tuath Rátha. O' Flannagáin was reluctant to hand over the annual tribute to the bronaghs; stating that it would be as safe with him as it would be with the tribute collectors. Accordingly, the bonaghs forcefully collected this tribute in kind by rounding up cattle, preys and other stock. However, O'Flannagan and his party pursued the men across Sliabh Dha Chon, close to Reyfad until they reached Galc Mhanchah or Clais an Chaim (also known as Glack) where a battle took place. During this struggle the women and children of Boho retrieved the cattle. Fifteen of McGuires men and 25 of the Boho men were killed including the chief Flannagan. Incensed by reports of this rebellion, Maguire summoned his council of chiefs to decide on the compensation the Flannagan would pay. The result of a council of the other chiefs of Fermanagh was that since chief of the Flannagans had died in battle and they had lost 25 men, then there was no more need for settlement. This verdict was delivered by O Breislein, whom Maguire suspected of bias since they both came from the Fanad. Suspecting part of a wider rebellion, McGuidhr summoned his son Giollas Losa Ma Guidir from Briefne (heir apparent to the Fermanagh throne) and directed him to Sliabh dha Chon (mountain of the two hounds) which was previously known as Gleann Caom, the mountainous tract that lies between Fermanagh and Briefne Ui Kuairc (Brienfny O Rourke), lying within the Boho area at that time. He counseled his son about the area, since it was the place where Fionn lost his two hounds 'through devilry or magic of the children of Lir'. He was then to make his way to his brother in Beal Atha Seannaigh (Ballyshanon) and tell him (O Domhnaill) of the rebellion.

Maghnus and Giolla 'losa then enlisted the help of some 700 men from Tyrconnell (Tir Chonnail) including Gallagher (O Gallchubhair), Bohill (O Baoighill) and the three Sweenys (Mac Suibhnes) who proceeded from Ath Seanaigh to Leac na nArm (Lack) and did not stop until they had reached to Sliabh Dha Chon. They first called in at Tuath Lurg to collect tribute from O Maoladuin. Since he did not have it they sent him to custody at Port Dobhrain at Knockninny. Next was the Tuath of Tir Cheannada where Clann Mhe Guinnnseannain, O'Duibhain, O Seaghdhannain and Clann Mhic Anuisce lived on the hill known as Craobh Ui Fhadachain, where the Muintear Fhuadachain used to be. Giolla Tosa asked for tribute which they could not provide. He then ordered the arrest of Ma Guinnsionnain and all the tribe present to set an example also had them sent to Port Dobhrain. They proceeded then to have all the heads of the seven tuaths bound and fettered and sent to Port Dobhrain to extract the eric that they owed . After this tour of the county, O Domhnaills men camped at the top of Gleann Dorcha (dark valley) and then at Srath na d'Tarbh in the townland of templenaffrin which is named after the fight of the two bulls, Donn Cuailgne and Finnbheannach. Eventually the tribute from all seven Fermanagh tuaths was paid with eric (compensation) at Port Dobhrain, the Maguires royal residence at Knockninny. An eric of 700 milk cows was levied on O'Flanagan as a balance for the 700 men Maguire had employed to enforce his tribute collection who had come from Tyrconnell (Donegal). The new Flannagan together with the heads of the seven tuaths were then made swear allegiance to McGuidhr and the new Flannagan was officially recognized. There then followed three days of feasting "to the high, to the lowly, to the laity, to the clergy, to the druids, to the ollambs in the royal household, and to the Tyrconnell (Tir Chonnail) party".

Later historical accounts of Túath Rátha described the region as extended from Belmore mountain to Belleek and from Lough Melvin to Lough Erne.

In 1483, Boho is mentioned in The Annals of Ulster upon the death of John O'Fialain (Ua Fialain), "the Ollam in poetry" of the sons of Philip Mag Uidhir (McGuire) and herenagh of Botha. Again in Annals of the Four Masters (Mícheál Ó Cléirigh, 1487) the area is mentioned on the death of Teige (Tadhg), the son of Brian Mac Amlaim Mag Uidhir (McGuire), son of Auliffe Mag Uidhir, who had first been Parson of Botha, and then Vicar of Cill-Laisre (Killesher) In 1498 there are reports of Maine, the son of Melaghlin, son of Matthew Mac Manus, slain in Botha-Muintire-Fialain, by the sons of Cathal Ua Gallchobair (O'Gallagher). There is also mention in 1520 of Nicholas, the son of Pierce O'Flanagan, Parson of Devenish, who was "unjustly removed from his place by the influence of the laity, and died at Bohoe". In 1552 there is a mention of Tadhg, the son of Tadhg, son of Eoghan O'Ruairc, who was slain in treachery in Bothach-Ui-Fhialain, by the Davine, son of Lochlainn.

Boho is again mentioned during the inquisition of church lands held during the reign of James I of England in 1609–1610, described as Boghae. At that point in time, the land was divided amongst septs, the head of which was a herenagh who paid tribute to the bishop of Clogher. The herenagh in Boho at that time was known as O'Fellan and under him was another sept "in the nature of a herenagh", called Clan McGarraghan (Mac Arachain). O'Fellan is described as having a free 'tate' or tathe, called Karme (Carn), to himself, and another, called Rostollon, which was divided among his sept of 'doughasaes' equally. The document also describes an area of land called KillmcIteggart or Farrennalter, one part of which belonging to the parson, and the other to the vicar.

In 1610 the area of Boho is described as extending into the barony of Clonawley (Clanawley), whose limits are bounded by the lands of Aghara in the west, Sleveamwell Hill in Clanawley in the east, the river of Bealaghmore in the north, and by Ourae mountain, also to the north. By 1837, before parish boundaries were altered, the parish was still quite large and was described as containing 2,581 inhabitants, comprising 15,058 1/2 statute acres, of which 6,151 1/4 are in the barony of Magheraboy and 8,907 1/4 in that of Clanawley. In those times this area also included the village of Belcoo. In more recent times due to restructuring the parish grew smaller until the mid-19th century when it contained 51 townlands. Today the number of townlands in the area stands at 46.

The name of a nearby school, Portora Royal School in Enniskillen (established 1618), is purported to be derived from the Irish Port Abhla Faoláin, meaning "landing place of the apple trees of Faolán". This may refer to Bhotha Mhuintir Uí Fhialáin, a tribe that inhabited the Boho area.
In the mid-17th century, historical records mention John McCormick, son of Cormick, who received a grant of land at Drumboy, Boho. It is stated that he gave evidence against Lord Conor Maguire at his trial for treason and was later appointed as one of the commissioners who took evidence on the massacres of 1641. After his death, his estates in Boho and Cleenish were left to his wife and nephew William McCormick.

== Demographics ==
=== 2011 Census ===
The 2011 census combined the villages of Boho, Cleenish and Letterbeen into the same ward. On Census Day (27 March 2011) the usually resident population of Boho Cleenish And Letterbreen Ward was 3,185 accounting for 0.18% of the NI total.

- 99.40% were from the white (including Irish Traveller) ethnic group;
- 55.23% belong to or were brought up in the Catholic religion and 41.22% belong to or were brought up in a 'Protestant and Other Christian (including Christian related)' religion; and
- 38.15% indicated that they had a British national identity, 36.73% had an Irish national identity and 31.15% had a Northern Irish national identity*.
- Respondents could indicate more than one national identity

On Census Day 27 March 2011, in Boho Cleenish And Letterbreen Ward, considering the population aged 3 years old and over:

- 11.88% had some knowledge of Irish;
- 4.13% had some knowledge of Ulster-Scots; and
- 0.85% did not have English as their first language.

== Places of interest ==
=== Boho High Cross ===
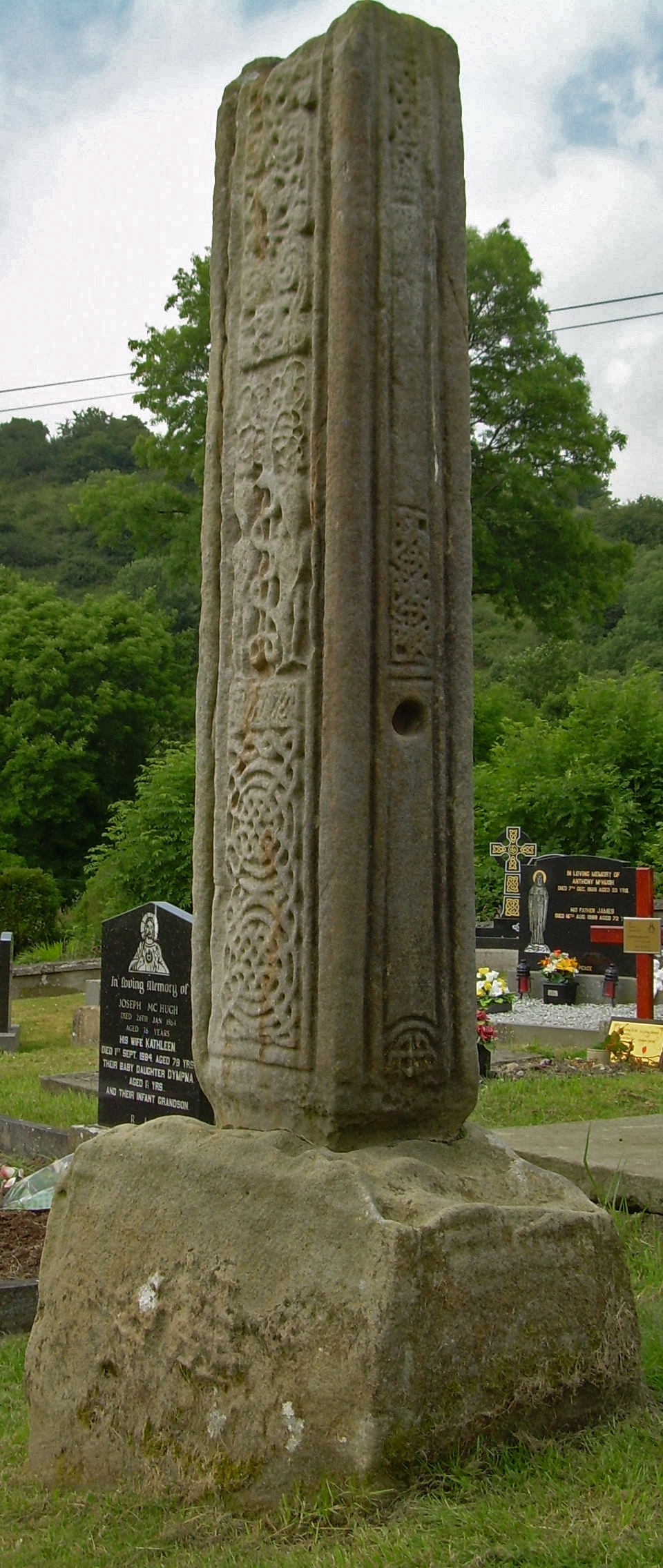
Boho High Cross, June 2009, Toneel North, Boho

The High Cross in Boho graveyard (grid ref H1167 4621) is on an eminence overlooking the Sacred Heart Church (patron St Feadhbar or St Faber) in the townland of Toneel North. It may date from the 10th century and comprises a weathered sandstone shaft. Excavation of the cross have suggested that it was moved to its present position in 1832, when the site was first reused for Roman Catholic worship, the new church being built in the original graveyard slightly south of the old one.

The west face of the cross shaft depicts the presentation of the John the Baptist in the Temple. The central figure holds a child in their arms and is accompanied by a figure either side. Above this carving is the Baptism of Jesus by John the Baptist with the River Jordan flowing between their feet. The East face of the cross shaft depicts Adam and Eve in the Garden of Eden together with a tree and serpent who is looking at one of the figures. The accompanying socketed base of red sandstone in which the shaft rests measures 90 x 88 cm at ground level and 62 cm in height. There is conjecture that the base of the cross is a bullán which men would resort to in cases of childless marriages. The existing doorway of the nearby Church of Ireland at Farnaconnell is thought to have originated from the pre-reformation church at Toneel North.

=== Reyfad Stones ===
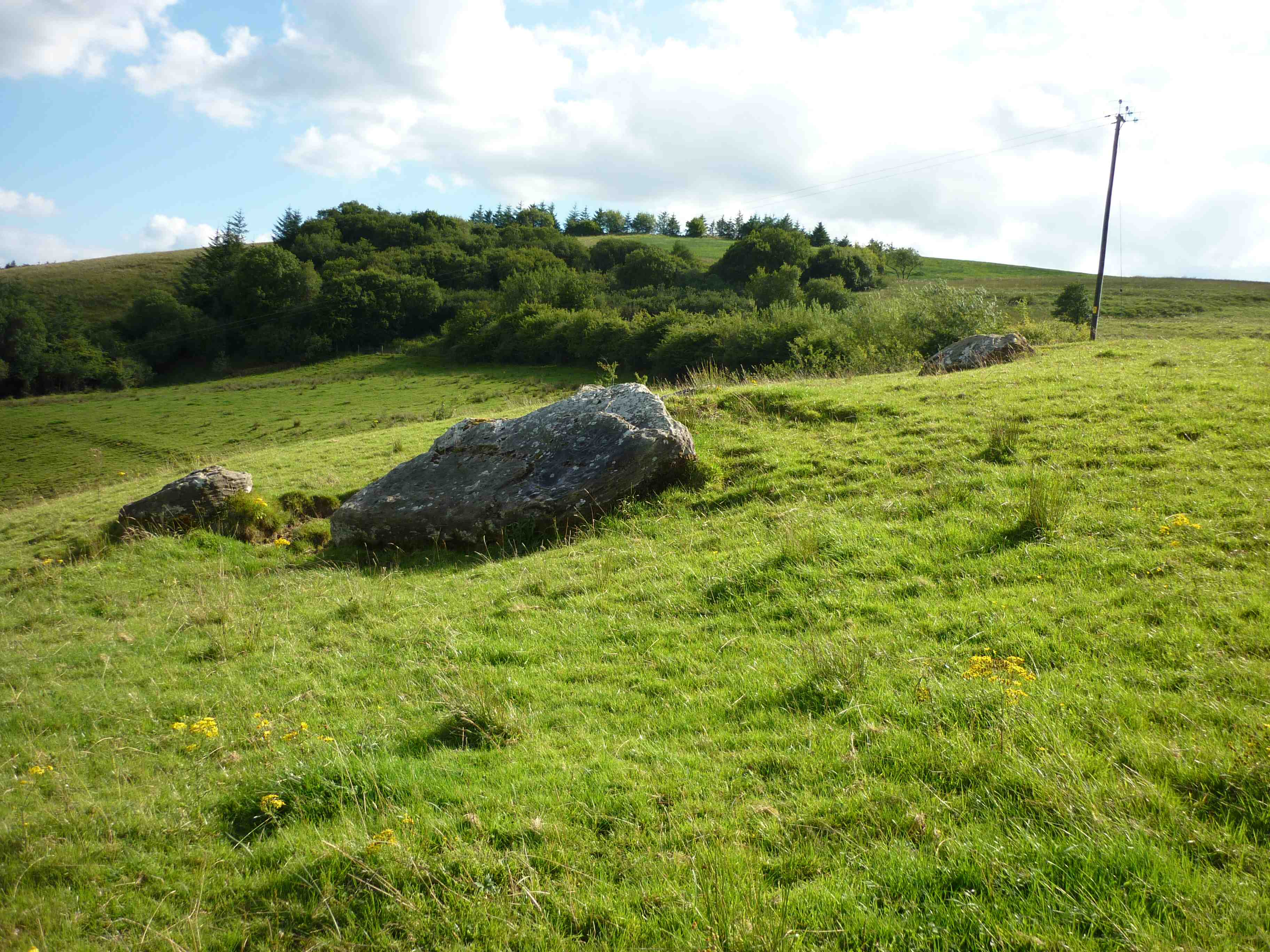
Cup and ring markings on the Reyfad Stones in Boho

The Reyfad Stones date from the neolithic age and are engraved with cup and ring mark inscriptions similar to those at Newgrange. The stones have been designated as a scheduled monument by the Northern Ireland Environmental Agency (SM 210:13). The stones are located in a field approximately 500 meters behind the Sacred Heart Church in Boho. Access is by permission.

=== Noon's Hole ===
Noon's Hole lies approximately 5 kilometres (3 mi) north west of the centre of Boho. At 81 metres (266 ft), this pothole is the deepest daylight shaft in Ireland.

=== Aghanaglack Tomb ===
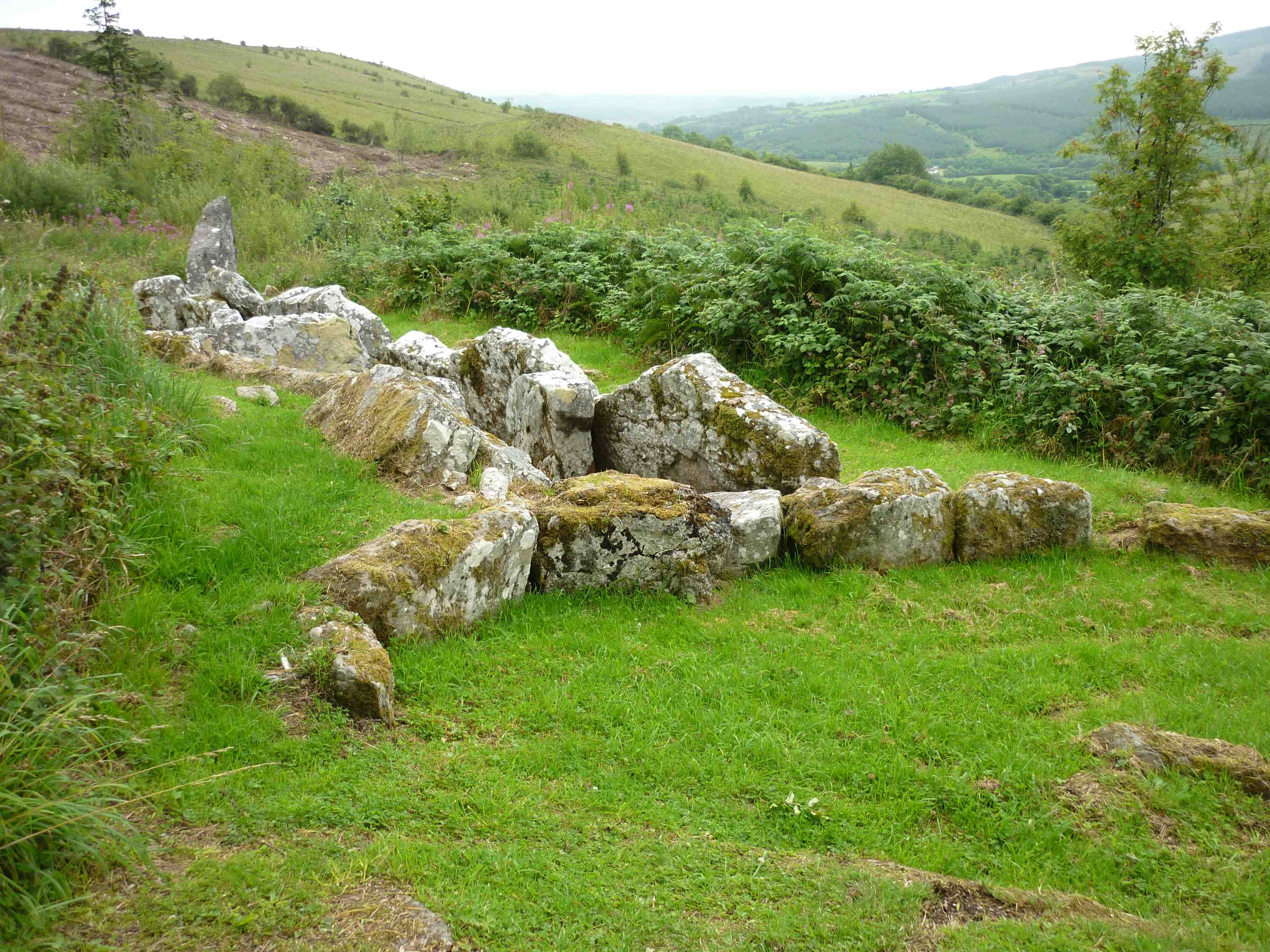
Dual Court Tomb, Aghanaglack, Boho

This Neolithic dual court tomb was discovered by Prof. Oliver Davies(1938).

=== Boho Waterfall ===
This is located at the entrance of Pollnagollum Cave in Belmore Forest.

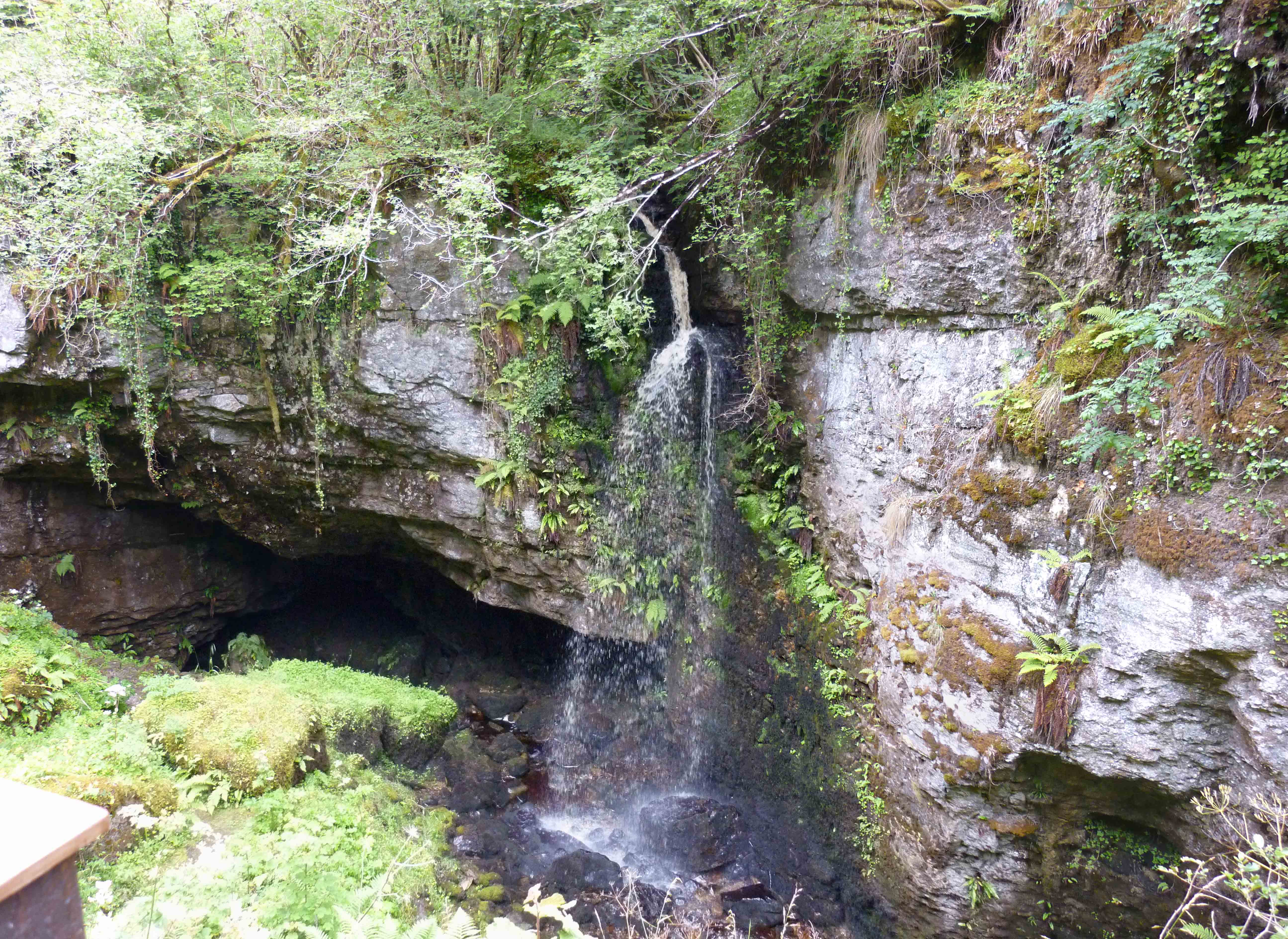
Waterfall over Pollnagollum, Boho

=== Boho Caves ===
Boho caves are the seventh longest cave passage system in Northern Ireland and have been designated as an ASSI. They are the only example of a joint-controlled maze cave in Northern Ireland. They also contain the only Irish modern-day record of the cave-dwelling water beetle (Agapus biguttatus).

=== Belmore Forest ===
Belmore forest (Grid ref:H127418) on the slopes of Belmore Mountain is a coniferous forest that covers approximately 863.99 ha (2134.96 acres). It is included in the UNESCO Marble Arch Caves Global Geopark. The forest contains Forestry houses, Coolarkan Quarry and Pollnagollum Cave.

=== Balintempo Forest ===
Balintempo forest is predominantly a coniferous forest plantation with areas of blanket bog and rocky outcrops of sandstone. Together with the forests of Carrigan, Big Dog, Conagher and Lough Navar they form the largest continuous tract of coniferous forest in Northern Ireland. The forest also forms part of the Ulster Way and the Marble Arch Caves Global Geopark. The area is notable for Aghanaglack chambered cairn.

=== Eagle's Knoll Cairn and Moylehid Ring ===
This neolithic site associated with the townland of Moylehid contains the Eagle's Knoll Cairn passage tomb and the Moylehid ring cairn. These are scheduled historic monuments.

=== The Linnet Inn ===
The Linnet Inn, situated near Boho Cross-Roads (glack cross) is over 200 years old and is one of the few remaining thatched public houses in Ireland. It contains a classic style open hearth fire and a unique "cave bar" in homage to the local caves designed and constructed by its previous owner, Brian McKenzie.

== Places of spiritual significance ==
The Boho area is replete with sacred/religious sites, from the present age such as the Church of Ireland at Farnaconnell and the Sacred Heart Church in Toneel North, to older pre-reformation churches. There were also places of worship which were historically situated outside conventional buildings that were used in times of religious and political strife, when the need for secrecy was paramount.

=== Boho Sacred Heart Church ===
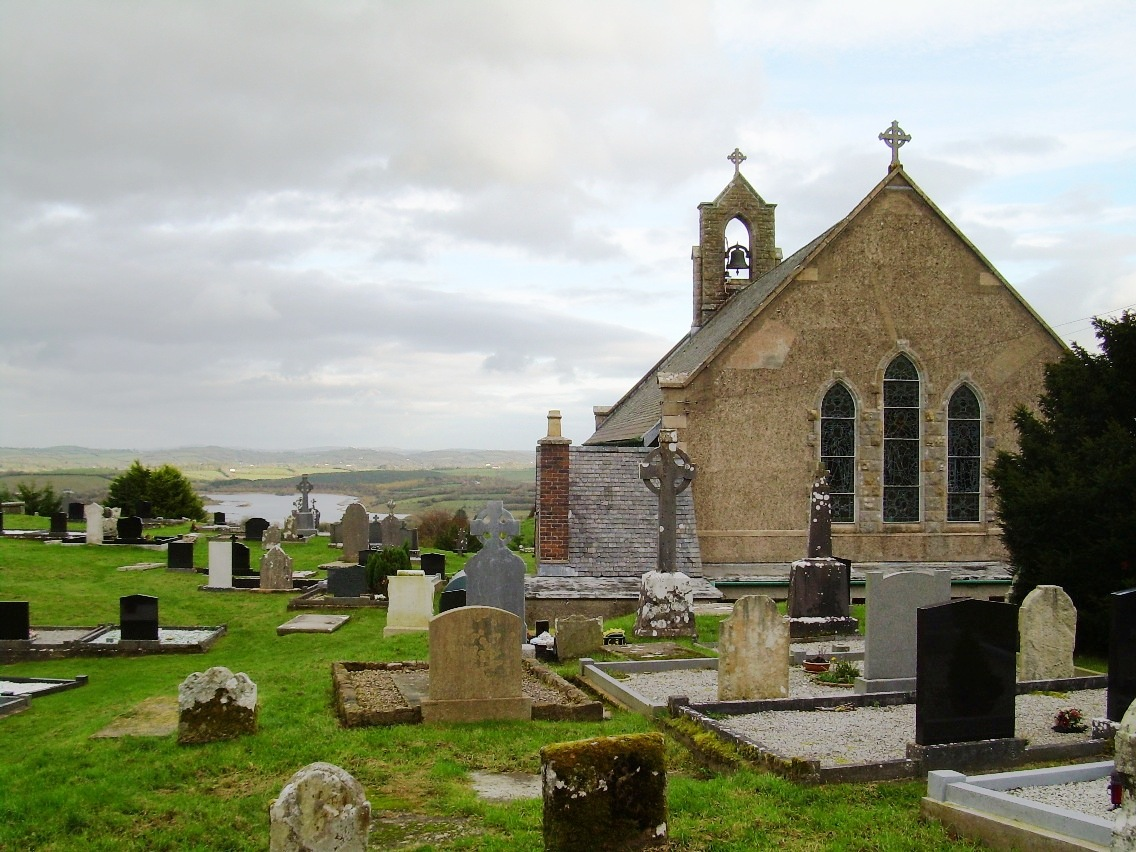
Sacred Heart Church graveyard overlooking Ross Lough in Boho

Built by the Rev Nicholas Smith in 1832, in townland of Toneel North possibly on the site of some ancient religious site. This is a four bay hall with a squared rubble gable and billcote renovated in 1913. The site is notable for the 10th-century High Cross.

=== Boho Parish Church of Ireland ===
Built in 1777 in the townland of Farnaconnell. A small three bay tower and hall church with round headed windows. The church was restored in 1830 and contains elements of medieval church 1 km north in archway entrance to the vestibule. (Grid Ref: N54.35475 W007.81112)

=== Unknown Church ===
There may have been a third traditional church in Boho parish called Templemollem or the Church of the Mill, which is mentioned in the Survey of 1603 and in the Inquisition of 1609. This was the chapel of ease called Templemullin on a tate of land owned by the sept of the McGaraghan which had an annual tribute to pay to the former Lisgoole Abbey of five gallons of butter and one axe. It is also thought that the pre-reformation church in Toneel North may have been built on an even older a pre-Christian pagan amphitheatre.

=== Unenclosed Religious Places ===
Outdoor places of worship which were common in the 18th century could be found in Aghakeeran where there was a Mass Garden and in nearby Aghanaglack during the same period, where there was a Mass Cave "Prison".

In Knocknahunshin there are records of a Mass Garden; this may refer to a place known locally as the Mass Rock. During the 18th century, in the parish of Boho (Inishmacsaint), there was a Mass Garden in Tullygerravra. In earlier periods, around the time of James I's inquisition into church lands, there were Mass Altars at Drumgamph, Fintonagh (which was also in the parish at this time) and Killyhoman.

=== St Fabers Well and St Fabers Bullan ===
Situated in the townland of Killydrum, St Fabers Well and Bullan are associated with the patron saint of the local Sacred Heart Church.

== Agriculture ==
=== Livestock and crops ===
Boho is mainly a pastoral area devoted to grazing animals.

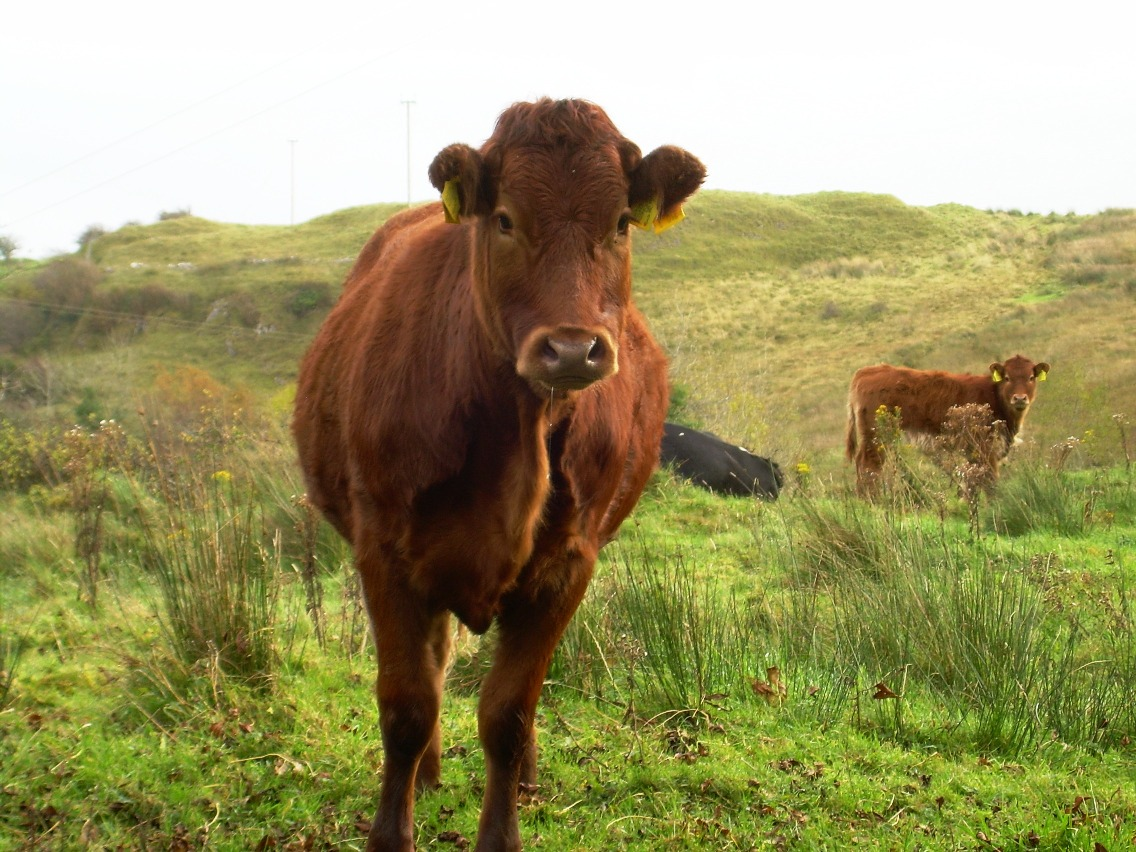
Red shorthorn cow grazing on limestone grassland on the Boho hills

One of the difficulties encountered in livestock farming in the Boho area (aside from the high rainfall) is that limestone grassland is low in copper, selenium, phosphorus and magnesium. These minerals are supplemented for cattle during the winter months.

There is little arable land in Boho and this is usually set aside for domestic use. Due to low farming revenues, there are few full-time farmers in the area and many having more than one occupation. The positive side to this low intensity agriculture is that Boho retains a high diversity of environmentally important species that are in decline on a national scale. These species are typically found in fen meadows, species rich hay meadows, pastures and semi-natural habitats.

Some areas of land in Boho are managed under the Environmentally Sensitive Area (ESA) scheme, with more (ecologically) significant areas being designated as Areas of Special Scientific Interest (ASSI) or as Special Areas of Conservation (SAC). Farmers receive ESA payments for low-intensity farming, i.e. cutting a meadow after the grass and wild herbs have seeded (ESA scheme). Livestock (cows) were traditionally fed hay in the winter months as far up as the early 1980s, but modern methods of silage has overtaken this practice due to its higher nutritional value.

== Geological and hydrological environment ==
There are also three mountain peaks in Boho, namely Belmore 398 m (1,306 ft), Tullybrack, 386 m (1,266 ft) (incorporating Glenkeel, 373 m (1,224 ft) and Knockmore, 277 m (909 ft).
The area of Boho is replete with karst features such as potholes, limestone pavement, dry valleys due to the predominant limestone bedrock which gives it significance at a national level. The specific types of bedrock take their names from local townlands such as Carn Limestone, Knockmore Limestone and Knockmore Sandstone.

=== Karst features ===
There are three principal cave/karst systems in the Boho area, namely the Boho Caves, Reyfad–Glenkeel and Noon's Hole–Arch Cave system, situated under the mountains of Belmore, Tullybrack and Knockmore respectively. Many of these caves were first explored by local people, but the first detailed exploration and surveying of any caves in the area was undertaken by two cavers known as Édouard-Alfred Martel (the father of French speleology) and naturalist Lyster Jameson in 1895.

Amongst the most notable caves beneath Belmore are Boho Caves, Aghnaglack Cave, Aghnaglack Rising, Pollbeg, Pollkeeran and Pollnagollum Coolarkan.

Within the Tullybrack area are Braad Dry Valley, Carrickbeg (Bunty Pot), Fairy Cave, Ivy Hole, Little Reyfad, Mad Pot, Murphy's Hole, Oweyglass Caves, Pollbeg, Pollmore, Pollnacrom, Polltullybrack, Rattle Hole, Reyfad Pot and Seltanacool Sinks.

The most notable caves in the Knockmore region include Noon's Hole, Arch Cave, Aughakeeran Pot, Crunthelagh Sink, Killydrum Sink, Old Barr Sink, Pollanaffrin and Seltanahunny Sink.

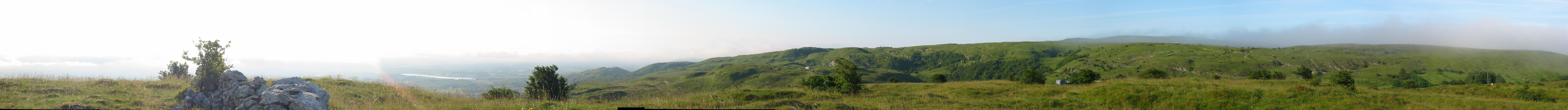
Panoramic view of some of the hills of Boho.

=== Rivers and Loughs ===
Rivers passing through Boho include the Sillees River which runs from Lough Navar Forest Park to Lower Lough Erne and its tributaries, the Screenagh and Boho Rivers. There are also five major streams which drain into the Reyfad/Carrickbeg catchment area and are linked to the Carrickbeg resurgence. One of these streams, entering Polltullybrack (second entrance to Reyfad Pot), is known as the Reyfad stream.

There are four loughs associated with the civil parish of Botha, including Lough Nacloyduff (Loch na Cloiche Duibhe) which is in the townland of Clogherbog and Lough Acrottan (Loch an Chrotáin) in Glenkeel. There are two other lakes associated with older parish boundaries, those of Carran and Ross Loughs.

Lough Nacloyduff (meaning the lake of the Dark Pit or digging) is about 1-acre (4,000 m^{2}) in surface area. To the north on Knockmore Mountain are some yellow sandstone cliffs which contain "the lettered caves". These three caverns, two of them artificial in appearance, include oghamic style writing on their walls, consisting of crosses and star like shapes inside rectangles.

=== November 2009 flooding ===
The Boho is also prone to regular flooding. One of the most recent events was in November 2009. With water in Lough Erne at its highest level since records began, the Sillees River, which flows through the parish, burst its banks causing traffic disruption for several days. The flooding affected Corr Bridge, Drumaraw, Muckenagh, Carran Lake, Samsonagh and Mullygarry. Killyhommon Primary School had to be closed as drivers struggled to negotiate floods.

== Flora and fauna ==
=== Flora ===
As a consequence of the local geology and low intensity farming practices, the Boho area has a high biodiversity of floral habitat types that is almost unparalleled in the whole of Northern Ireland as evidenced by the number of Areas of Special Scientific Interest, provisional ASSI's (pASSI), candidate Special Areas of Conservation (cSAC) and proposed Areas of Outstanding Natural Beauty (pAONB). These range from open freshwater lakes to high calcareous grasslands and upland bogs.

Fen meadow is a classic Boho habitat type, consisting of wet fields locally described as a bog meadow, typified by the species devil's-bit scabious, bog thistle, sedges and occasionally tormentil, purple moor grass and rushes (Juncaceae). In Northern Ireland, this type of terrain only covers 0.4% of the total land area and has decreased by 18% over the last ten years mainly due to the 21% decrease in Fermanagh coverage.

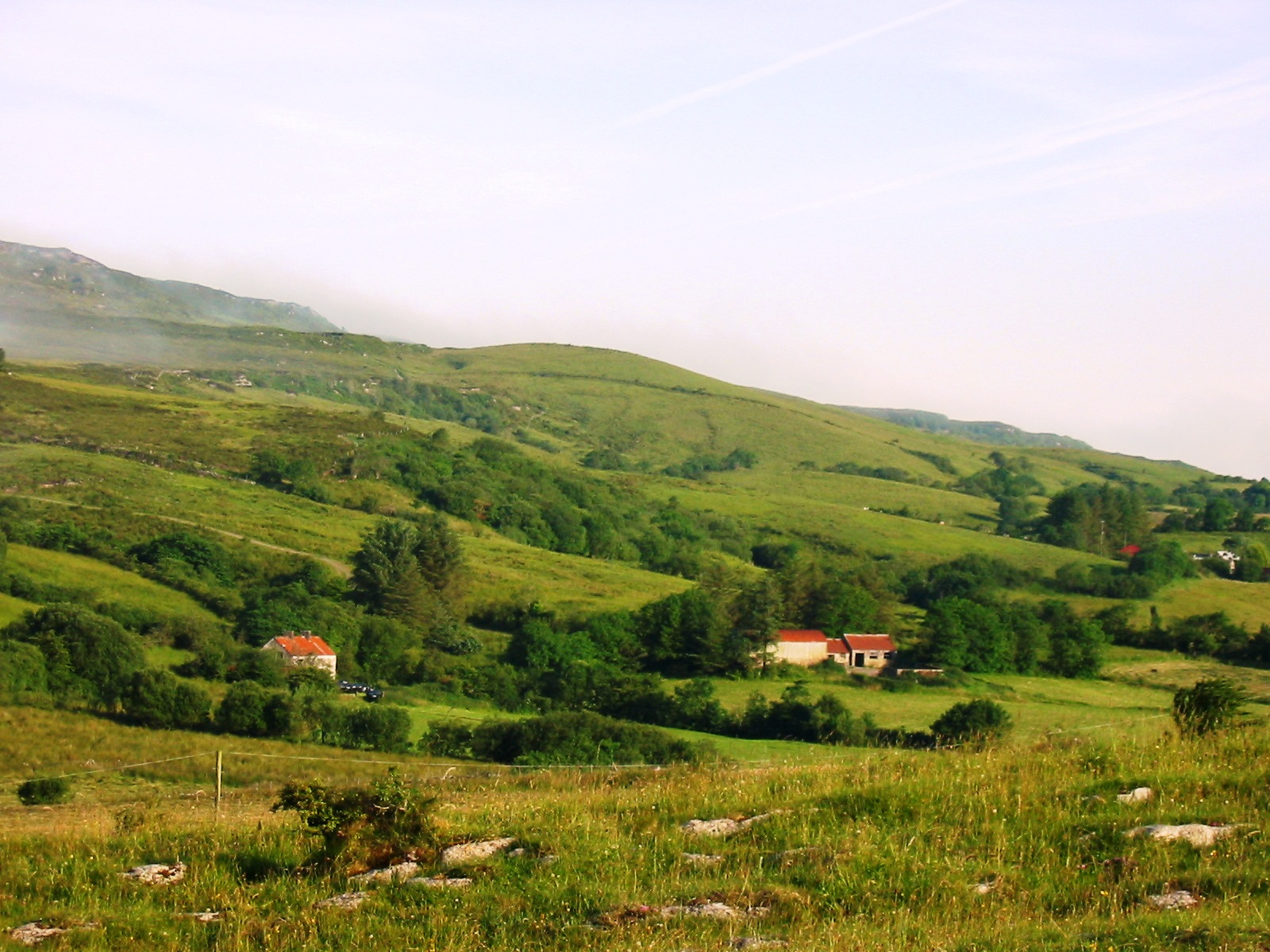
Limestone grassland in the foreground of Boho hills

In more upland areas, drier habitats include calcareous grassland, which is very rare in a Northern Ireland context covering only 0.1% of the total land area, and which in only ten years, between 1990 and 2000, underwent a 7% decrease in coverage. Calcareous grassland is species rich, typified by blue moor-grass, wild-mountain thyme, lady's bedstraw, fairy flax and lady's-mantle as well as fescue grasses, sweet vernal grass, bent grass, crested dog's-tail grass, carnation sedge Cyperaceae and devil's-bit scabious on the thin layer of soil which covers the limestone rock. Within this type of habitat, limestone pavement can also often be found, which can promote an even greater diversity of species.

Limestone grassland habitat in Northern Ireland is exclusive to County Fermanagh from the Boho–Knockmore region to Cuilcagh Mountain Park, this habitat and its associated karst features are so environmentally important that the latter Marble Arch region was designated part of the European Geoparks Network, the Global Network of National Geoparks and the world's first International Geopark, consequently adding international significance to the Boho landscape. In Boho, this type of land is often associated with dry stone walls, built from limestone, which are constructed in a peculiarly local style and are equally important source of biodiversity.

There are large areas of bog in Boho, typified by species such as bell heather, cross-leaved heath and ling (common heather). Additionally species such as sundew (which are carnivorous) and bog asphodels can be found.
The woodlands of Boho consist of a mixture of plantation woodlands and semi-natural broadleaf woodlands (mainly ash and hazel).

As well as these rich ecological resources, Boho is well known for its small field sizes, which provide many field boundaries of hedges and dry stone walls.

==== Scheduled species ====
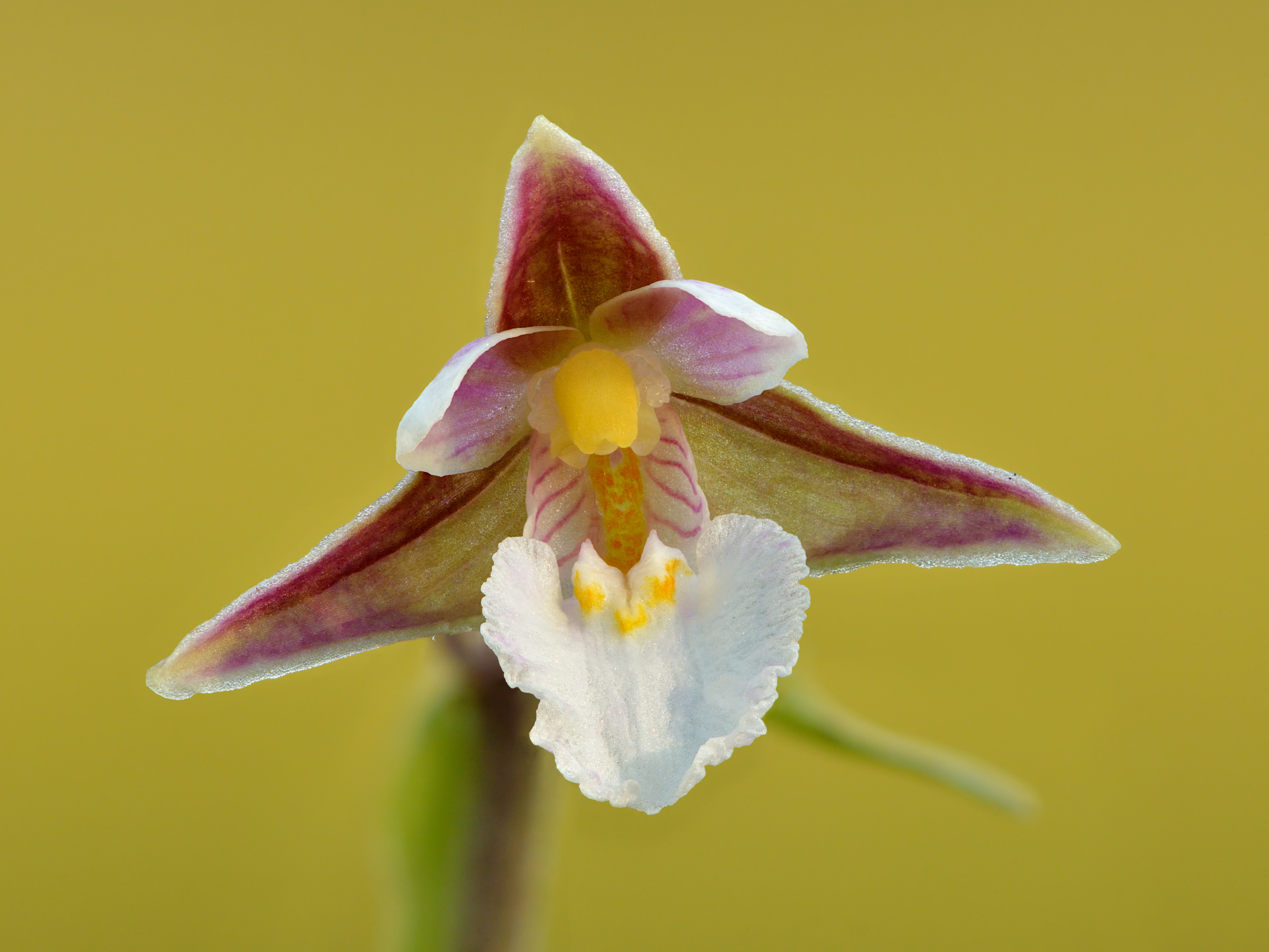
Marsh helleborine

Added to the importance of the above habitats, the Boho area includes large numbers of rare and protected plant species specified as priority species by the Northern Ireland Environment Agency, including Irish eyebright (Euphrasia salisburgensis var. hibernica) which is located on the western edges of Boho near Knockmore cliffs, small white orchid (Pseudorchis albida), also known as the white mountain orchid, blue-eyed grass (Sisyrinchium bermudiana), which belongs to the American element of the Irish flora i.e. those plants being absent from any other part of Eurasia but exist in North America, green-flowered helleborine (Epipactis phyllanthes), Cornish heath (Erica vagans), which is found near Boho, yellow bird's-nest (Monotropa hypopitys).

Other notable species to be found in the area include Swedish pouchwort (Calypogeia suecica), a bryophyte last found in Aghahoorin near Boho in 1961, bee orchid, (Ophrys apifera), mountain avens (Dryas octopetala), marsh helleborine, (Epipactis palustris) and bird's-nest orchid (Neottia nidus-avis) located in proximity to Boho Caves.

==== Microbiota ====
Microbiota or microscopic organisms specifically associated with the Boho alkaline/radon environment include a bacterium known as Streptomyces sp. 'myrophorea', isolate McG1.

This species of Streptomyces was isolated from an old local soil cure that dates back to the Reverend James McGirr, the Christian parish priest of Boho in 1803. In antibacterial tests, this Streptomyces has been shown to inhibit the growth of many multi-drug resistant pathogens including carbapenem resistant Acinetobacter baumannii, vancomycin resistant Enterococcus faecium, and methicillin resistant Staphylococcus aureus (MRSA).

These antibiotic producing species have also been found in other locations in the area such as Streptomyces sp. CJ13 which has been found to inhibit the growth of multiresistant Gram positive and Gram negative bacteria as well as the yeast Candida.

=== Fauna ===
Non-domestic animals in the Boho area include the Irish hare, wild goats, foxes, badgers, red squirrels, rats, mice and shrews and the occasional pine marten. Amongst Northern Ireland's priority species are Daubenton's bat (Myotis daubentoni) which was observed in a nursery roost located in Boho Caves in July 1895.

Bird species are also well represented in Boho. In 1998 the number of breeding species recorded in a random transect of Boho was 26 and in 1999 that number was 27.

With regards to the palæontological, the complete skeleton of an Irish stag (Cervus elaphus) was retrieved from the area and is now housed in the National Museum in Dublin.

== Folk tales ==
There are many stories of originating from the Boho area which tell of faeries, faerie bushes, banshees, swallow holes (potholes) and ancient stones.

One recurring mention is of a changeling or faerie who has a prodigious talent for music. The author (or the teller) of the tale states that the faerie has a particular flair when it comes to musical instruments, traditionally the fiddle or the pipes. He develops such a gift that anyone who listens will be enchanted by the music (like the Greek myth of the sirens). Commenting on the appearance of the faerie, the story teller recounts that he saw him living with two old brothers beyond the "dogs well" and he looked like a "wizened wee monkey" ...the story teller estimates his age to be around 10 or 11 years but it appears that he could still could not walk, rather, "bobbed". His gift on the tin whistle was second to none, his particular penchant being long-forgotten tunes. All of a sudden he disappeared, never to be heard of by the story-teller again.

There are other folk tales surrounding St Febor or St Faber, who placed a curse on Baron O Phelans castle in Boho causing it to sink into the earth although there are no reports as to where in the area this castle was located. Some of these tales are recounted in the old country song, "Ma na Bh Fianna (Monea) – The Plain of the Deer".

== Notable residents ==
- James Gamble, later American emigrant and co-founder of Procter & Gamble, was born in the Boho rectory in 1803.

== Bohos around the world ==
Places that share the same name as Boho around the world include Boho (also known as Fort Boho) in Bari, Somalia 11.933333°N 50.883333°E, Ras Boho, Somalia 11.933333°N 50.916667°E and Uadi Boho, Somalia 4.333333°N 45.383333°E, as well as Boho, Leyte, Philippines 11.31667°N 124.3333°E, and Boho, Australia 36.696659°S 145.771354°E.

== See also ==
- List of places in County Fermanagh
- List of civil parishes of County Fermanagh
- List of townlands in County Fermanagh
- List of towns and villages in Northern Ireland
- List of towns and villages in Northern Ireland
- Muintire-Fialain
