= Carn, County Fermanagh =

Townland in County Fermanagh, Northern Ireland

- Townland
- Location within Northern Ireland
- Coordinates: 54.3473°N 7.8050°W
- Country: United Kingdom
- Division: Northern Ireland
- County: County Fermanagh

Carn or Carngreen is a townland situated in County Fermanagh, Northern Ireland. It is situated within the civil parish of Boho and Fermanagh and Omagh district.

== History ==
The area contains evidence of previous Neolithic habitation in the form of a ráth which was discovered by archaeologist VB Proudfoot in 1952. Over a period of three weeks, the archeological team discovered a rath approximately 100 ft by 60 ft. The site contained a hearth, a round –backed tanged knife common in Ireland in the first millennium AD, an Irish bone pin and fragments of a horse shoe.

In the Middle Ages, this area was the site of a famous battle known as the Battle of Carncross. The battle was between the Flannagan Clan, who were rulers of this area under the patronage of the Maguires, and the Maguires themselves, who were punishing the Flannagans for not submitting to their rule. The battle reportedly lasted four days, with the casualties numbering in the hundreds.

Eventually the Maguires won the battle and the Flannagans were forced to retreat to their castle in Knockmore. An even greater tragedy was to follow them afterwards as they were attacked by troops of Lord Mountjoy, who was sent by Elizabeth I of England. Most of the clan were slaughtered, save a few.

Other interesting features of the area include the Boho Caves, Boho Quarry, the old Police Barracks and Carn House.
