= Knocknahunshin =

Townland in County Fermanagh, Northern Ireland

Coordinates: 54.350°N 7.796°W

Knocknahunshin (from Irish Cnoc na hUinseann 'the hill of the ash trees'), is a townland in County Fermanagh, Northern Ireland. It is in the civil parish of Boho, in between the townlands of Glenkeel and Reyfad. Within this area are the sub-townlands of Arduagh, Carricknamulloge (from Irish Carraig na Mullóige), Carricknine, Horse Rock, Legloughra, Owneyglas, Silkins and Sterrickinard.

This area is mentioned as far back as 1672 as "K:nahinshina" in the Barony of Magheraboy. Later on, in 1834, it was referred to by its Irish name of Cnoc na h-Uinnsean meaning "ridge of the ash trees".

== See also ==
- List of townlands in County Fermanagh
