= Killydrum =

Townland in County Fermanagh, Northern Ireland

Coordinates: 54.3765°N 7.8411°W

Killydrum (from Irish Coill an Droma 'wood of the ridge') is a townland in County Fermanagh, Northern Ireland. It has previously been referred to as Kildrome (1659) and Killdrum (1695). This townland belongs to the land division of Old Barr in the area of Boho.

Killydrum is notable for the holy well named after St Faber' called Tober Faber, and its associated bullán. The area is historically linked to the home or castle of a chieftain called O'Fialain.

In the Ordnance Survey Letters of O' Donovan, the surveyor notes that (the virgin) St. Faber first attempted to build her church in Killydrum near the holy well, however the first days construction was destroyed overnight by an invisible being. A passing deer indicated that there was another place where she could build her church without threat and carried her books on its horns down to Monea. When the deer continued its journey across the Sillees river, it slipped on the banks and it took a while for the books to be re-attached. This slip was thought to be brought about by a genius or sheaver (shaver)who inhabited the river who did everything in his power to prevent the spread of Christianity in the region. Once St Faber understood this she cursed the river with sterility of fish and fertility in destroying human life and may it run uphill with the following phrase MI-ADH EISC A'S ADH BAIDHTE AG RITH ANAGHAIDH AN AIRD GO LA BRATHA. Another interpretation of the name Killydrum is 'church of the ridge' which makes sense in this context.

== Killydrum Sink ==
There are several limestone features in this townland described as Karst. One of these is Killydrum Sink. The area around the karst has been designated a provisional site of special scientific interest (PASSI) by the Department of the Environment (NI). The route of the main water course which passes through Killydrum Sink is believed to drain through the Noon's Hole–Arch system.

The area also contains what is locally referred to as the Faerie Circle which lies on the hill above St Fabers well.

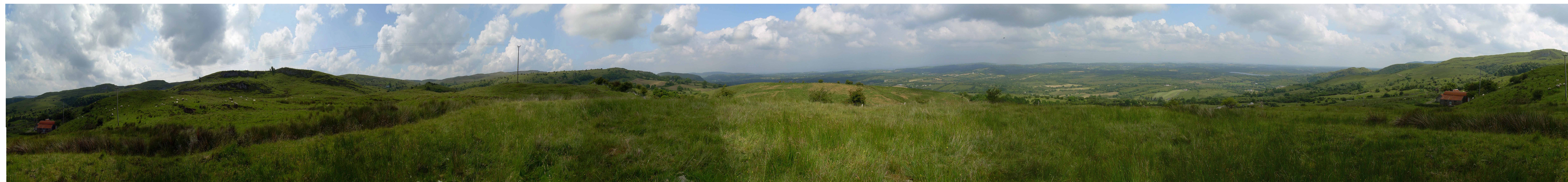
A panoramic view from the Faerie Circle in the townland of Killydrum.

== See also ==
- Caves of the Tullybrack and Belmore hills
