= Aghakeeran =

Townland in County Fermanagh, Northern Ireland

Coordinates: 54°23′22″N 7°50′31″W

Aghakeeran: Irish: Achadh Chaorthainn
- Location within Northern Ireland
- District: Fermanagh and Omagh
- County: County Fermanagh
- Country: Northern Ireland
- Sovereign state: United Kingdom
- UK Parliament: Fermanagh and South Tyrone
- NI Assembly: Fermanagh and South Tyrone

Aghakeeran (from Irish Achadh Chaorthainn 'field of rowan trees') is a townland in County Fermanagh, Northern Ireland. It is near Derrygonnelly, in the civil parish of Devenish and is situated within Fermanagh and Omagh district.

== History ==
One of the first mentions of the name of this townland was made during the survey of the 6 northern counties of Ireland commissioned by James 1 under the direction of Sir Josias Bodley for the plantation of Ulster. During this time verbal evidence to cartographers played a significant role in delimiting the borders of the townlands. However, given the uniform shape and areas of the parcels some historians cast doubt on their accuracy. The townland has also been referred to asAghakerin (OS map of 1609); Aghekeirin (1610: patent rolls of James 1); Aghakeirine/Aghakeirn(1630); Aghakiran/Aghakirhin/Agharrin (1659: census of Ireland during its reassignment to the parish of Devonish under the tituladoes of Cohanagh McGuire); Aughakeerane (1841); Aghaheeran and finally Aghahieran.

This townland was part of the civil parish of Boho area (1842) and also the religious parish of Botha, but this position has vacillated over the years. Since 1851 Aghakeeran has been in the civil parish of Devenish.
