= Kilnamadoo =

Townland and archaeological site in Ireland

- townland
- Coordinates: 54.351°N 7.774°W

Kilnamadoo or Kilnamaddoo (from Irish Coill na Madadh 'wood of the dogs') is a townland in County Fermanagh, Northern Ireland. It is situated within the civil parish of the area of Boho, as well as Fermanagh and Omagh district.

The Coal Bog road travels through this townland and the adjacent townland of Drumacoorin. This is a traditional peat cutting area and in past times was the main highway between Lough MacNean and Lough Erne. The area is particularly notable for the remnants of a Neolithic settlement found in the coal bog. An impressive bronze spearhead was also found in this area and is now on display in the National Museum of Ireland.

== Neolithic site ==
On 25 May 1880, a local person known as Mr Bothwell was cutting his turf when he unearthed the ancient site. He immediately sent for the archæologist Thomas Plunkett, who identified the remains as being a Neolithic settlement, situated on what was once an island or crannog in the midst of a body of water.

The dimensions of the crannog were 60 yards (55 m) long and 14 yards (13 m) wide. The settlement contained two oak wood huts, the larger measuring 11 feet 10 inches (3.61 m) square, and lay buried at least 21 feet (6.4 m), below the original surface of the bog. The huts themselves were dated at this time to approximately 4000 years old. The modern whereabouts of this settlement are now unknown, but artefacts from the site are retained in the National Museum of Ireland, including the handle of a stone axe.

== See also ==
- List of townlands in County Fermanagh
