= Aghahoorin =

Townland in County Fermanagh, Northern Ireland

Coordinates: 54.355314°N 7.824603°W

Aghahoorin (from Irish Achadh Fhuarain 'field of the spring well') is a townland in the area of Boho, County Fermanagh, Northern Ireland.

As far back as 1659 (Census of Ireland) this townland was known as Agharrin; later on it was known as Achadh Guirthin or Achadh Urthin "field of the suret" (1833). This townland is known for a fort on a hill and the remains of a sandstone quarry which was used to supply headstones for the local graveyards. The townland contains karst features which include the shake hole known as Pollkeeran and a rattle hole known as Murphy's Hole. as well as a Scheduled Historic Monument: a Bivallate rath, grid ref: H1185 4573.
