= Clogherbog =

Townland in County Fermanagh, Northern Ireland

Coordinates: 54.362°N 7.912°W

- Location within Northern Ireland
- Irish grid reference: H4151
- District: Fermanagh and Omagh
- County: County Fermanagh
- Country: Northern Ireland
- Sovereign state: United Kingdom
- Postcode district: BT
- Dialling code: 028, +44 28
- UK Parliament: Fermanagh and South Tyrone
- NI Assembly: Fermanagh and South Tyrone

Clogherbog is a townland in County Fermanagh, Northern Ireland. It is part of the civil parish of Boho, and contains the sub-townlands of Carrickrory, Lough Nacloyduff, Loughanquin, Loughnamanfin and Tullylaur. It is situated within Fermanagh and Omagh district.

The area is notable for the discovered remnants of ancient civilisations, including an Iron Age wooden cauldron and the lettered cave at Lough Nacloyduff (the lake of the dark caverns), which contains primitive inscriptions. The origins of this cave have been speculated on since a visit in 1850 by archaeologist William Wakeman, who subsequently presented his findings to the Royal Irish Academy.

Other features include a Mass rock which is inscribed with the date of 1777 and the Lake of the Fair Woman (Irish: Loch na mban fionn) which is the subject of an old tale.

== See also ==
- List of townlands in County Fermanagh
