= Belmore Mountain =

Mountain in Northern Ireland

- Sliabh Bhéal Mór
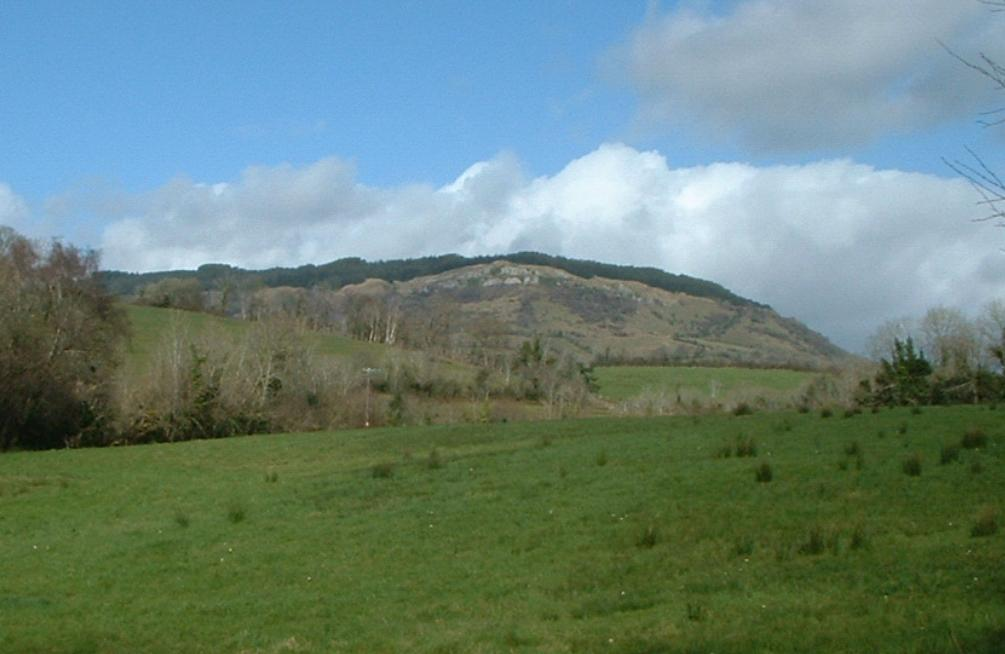
- Belmore Mountain, Spring 2005

Highest point
- Elevation: 398 m (1,306 ft)
- Prominence: 322 m (1,056 ft)
- Listing: Marilyn
- Coordinates: 54°19′26″N 7°47′19″W

Naming
- English translation: mountain of the big mouth
- Language of name: Irish

Geography
- Location within Northern Ireland
- Location: County Fermanagh, Northern Ireland
- OSI/OSNI grid: H138417
- Topo map: OSNI Discoverer 17

Belmore Mountain (from Irish Sliabh Bhéal Mór , meaning 'big mouth mountain') is a hill in the townland of Gortgall, western County Fermanagh, Northern Ireland. With a summit roughly 398 metres (1,306 ft) above sea level, it is the second highest point in Fermanagh, the highest being at Cuilcagh on the Northern Ireland–Republic of Ireland border in the south of the county. The historian John O Donovan (1834) states that the indigenous population called the mountain Bel Mor Muintir Pheodachain .

Belmore Mountain dominates the skyline in the nearby county town of Enniskillen and gives its name to Belmore Street.

== Geography ==
Geologically dominated by limestone, outcropping of the sedimentary rock forms extensive sheer cliffs near the summit. Chemical erosion caused by the natural acidity of water has formed a cave system underneath the mountain, accessible at the village of Boho. Faulting has produced the Knockmore escarpment on the western flanks of Belmore. Other small villages and hamlets around the foot of Belmore include Letterbreen and Springfield.

Agriculture is limited due to the steep slopes and thin peaty soils on Belmore, however extensive plantations of coniferous forest can be found on the upper plateau.

In 1894, archeologist Thomas Plunkett excavated both the Eagle’s Knoll Cairn passage tomb and Moylehid ring cairn in the townland of Moylehid; one of which is situated on an eastern spur of Belmore Mountain overlooking the Erne valley.

== Eponymy ==
The mountain also gives its name to an Irish earldom. Somerset Lowry-Corry, 4th Earl Belmore, served from 1868 to 1872 as the 14th Governor of New South Wales, where several features are named for him: the Belmore River, the suburb of Belmore in Sydney, Belmore Park, also in Sydney and in Goulburn. The name is also associated with Belmore Forest in the Boho area.

== See also ==
- Caves of the Tullybrack and Belmore hills
- List of Marilyns in Northern Ireland
