= Saint Faber =

6th century Irish nun

Stained Glass Window depicting St Faber and her pet deer in the Sacred Heart Church, Boho

Saint Faber (also St Feadhbar or St Febor) is the patron saint of the Sacred Heart Church in Boho, County Fermanagh and of Monea.

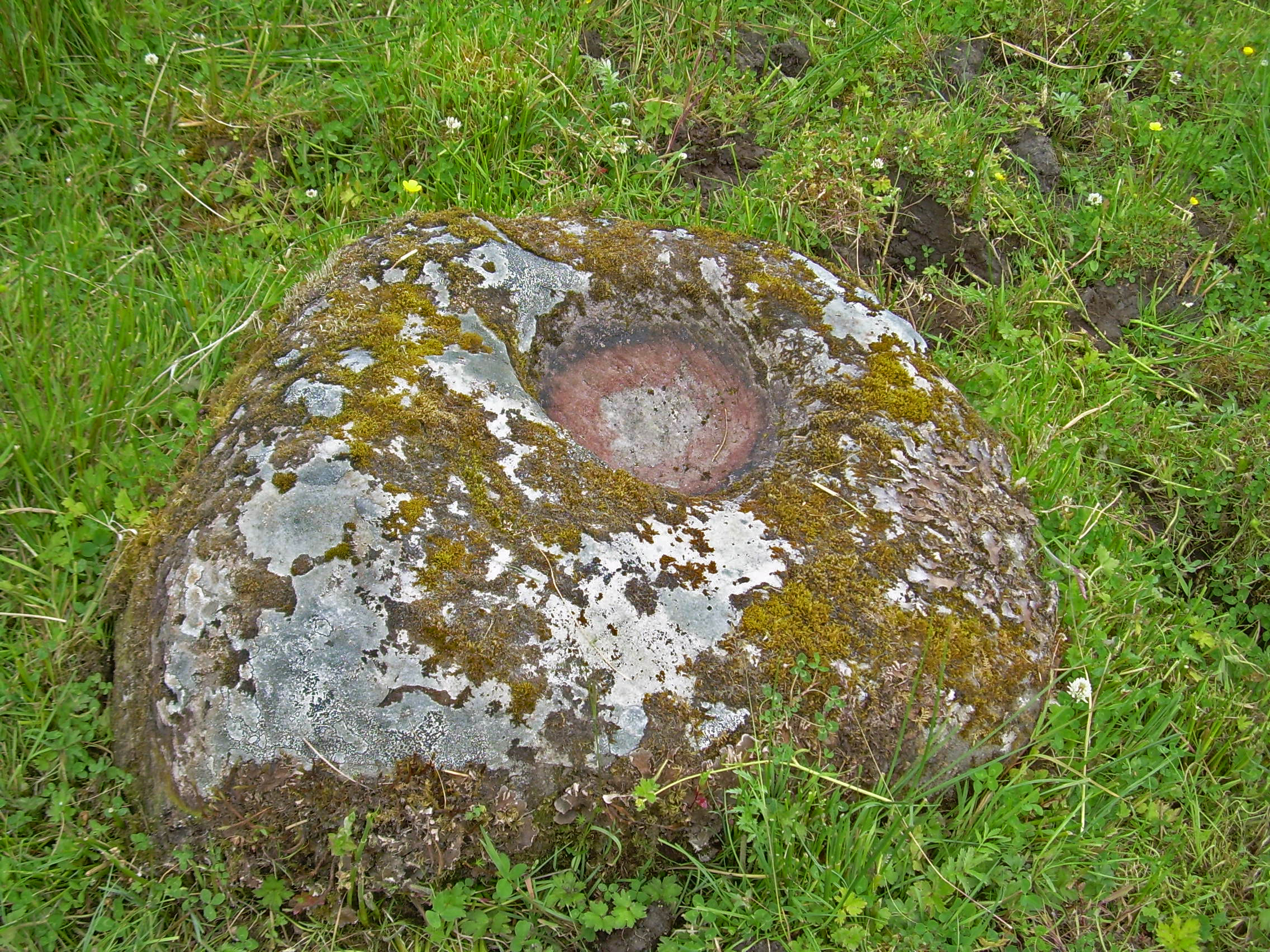
St Faber's bullán in the townland of Killydrum, Boho

One of the first references to St Faber's is in the text of the manuscript known as The Martyrology of Oengus the Culdee Óengus of Tallaght estimated to have been written at the beginning of the 9th century. This links the saint with Boho (Botha) and Tuath Ratha (Tir Ratha) together with her feast day (6 November), as follows: "Fedbair a virgin of Botha eich uaichnich in Tir ratha". This is reiterated in the 1630 text, "The Martyrology of Donegal: a Calendar of the Saints of Ireland".

There is a popular myth that St Faber had a pet deer which carried the sacred books that she was entrusted with. One day, as she was travelling to meet Baron O Phelan at his castle in Boho, the deer was harassed by some hunting hounds. In order to escape, the deer jumped into the Sillees River and in the process ruined St Fabers books. The saint then placed a curse on the river that it would run backwards, (previously, the Sillees river ran from Boho towards the sea) "the river writhed and recoiled," and now its route goes towards upper Lough Erne rather than the sea. The second part of her curse was that the river would be good for drowning and bad for fishing. If you look closely at the river route today you can still see some of the old routes that have dried up or formed oxbow-like depressions in the ground.

It is reputed that Saint Faber set up a monastery/nunnery in Boho, possibly at the site of the church in Toneel North and introduced Christianity to the area. There are several sites associated with St Faber around Boho including St Faber's bullán (rock cut basin) and St Faber's well, both found in the townland of Killydrum, Boho.
