= Boho Caves =

Collection of caves in Boho, County Fermanagh, Northern Ireland

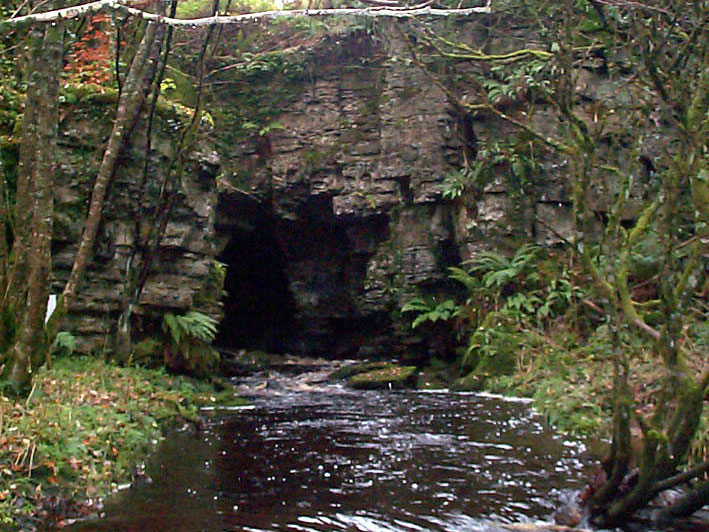
- Quarry entrance in flood; resurgence is further downstream in drier conditions
- Interactive map of Boho Caves
- Location: Irish Grid: H1268 4431; Boho, County Fermanagh, Northern Ireland
- Coordinates: 54.3468°N 7.8019°W
- Length: 2.5 km (1.6 mi)
- Geology: Limestone
- Entrances: 7+
- Entrances list: Main Sink, Quarry, Field Shakeholes
- Hazards: High flood risk: extremely active in wet weather
- Access: Owned by Fermanagh District Council

The Boho Caves (pronounced /boʊ/ BOH, from Irish Botha, meaning 'huts') are a collection of caves centred on the village of Boho, County Fermanagh, Northern Ireland, on the northern slopes of Belmore Mountain. They encompass the main Boho Cave and the smaller Waterfall Cave and Upper and Lower Ravine Caves. The Boho Cave system is the sixth-longest cave system in Northern Ireland, is designated an Area of Special Scientific Interest (ASSI #144) and is the only example of joint-controlled caves in Northern Ireland.

== Geology and hydrology ==
The rock strata at Boho Caves date from the Asbian substage of the Carboniferous period, estimated to be around 325 million years old. The rock sequence exposed at Boho consists of the Glencar Limestone Formation which is overlain by the Dartry Limestone Formation, composed of cherty limestones and limestones and shales of the Carn Limestone Member. The Dartry Limestone is, in turn, overlain by the Meenymore Formation and the Glenade Sandstone. The caves are formed within the Dartry Limestone. The main cave contains typical karst features such as stalactites, stalagmites, cave curtains and flowstone.

The water flowing through the Boho Caves originates from Aghanaglack River. After dry weather, the river sinks in the streambed well upstream of the caves and does not emerge until far downstream past the ravine. In wetter conditions, water flows into the cave system via several routes including the Main Sink entrance, which can sump and overflow into the nearby field shakeholes. It then exits the cave at the usual downstream resurgences, as well as the Upper and Lower Ravine caves (via bedding planes from the northern end of Boho Cave) and in particularly high floods, the Quarry entrance (see picture).

== History of exploration ==
The caves at Boho have been known locally for hundreds of years, and are mentioned on Ordnance Survey Ireland's 6-inch survey of Ireland, conducted between 1829 and 1841. By 1870 it was quite the norm for tourists to arrange a guided tour with a local resident, as William Wakeman described in his guide book of that year.

Although Édouard-Alfred Martel and Lyster Jameson definitely visited Boho parish in 1895 and investigated some of the caves, Martel's description makes it unclear as to whether he visited Boho Caves or nearby Pollnagollum Coolarkan. It is however clear that Jameson visited both caves himself, before Martel's arrival in the area and with the assistance of Rev. A. Knight, and reported on the fauna he discovered in the caves.

Boho quarry, in which there are a number of entrances to the cave, was active until the mid-1950s and many local people would have explored short sections of the cave during and before this time. The Yorkshire Ramblers explored Boho Caves in 1907 but it was not until the mid-1960s that a survey of this complicated system was attempted by Dublin cavers. The system was extensively resurveyed by the Reyfad Group in the 1980s.

== Access ==
Boho is a cave much used by guided educational parties studying the local environment and by casual visitors, but exploration should never be undertaken lightly. In wet weather the narrow passages flood quickly and at these times the cave is extremely dangerous and should be avoided. Heavy flood pulses have been known to inundate the cave up to 24 hours after heavy rain has ceased, and the entire system is known to flood to the roof in under an hour.

It is also recommended that the Upper Ravine area downstream of Boho quarry should not be visited under any circumstances because of roosting bats.

== Fauna ==
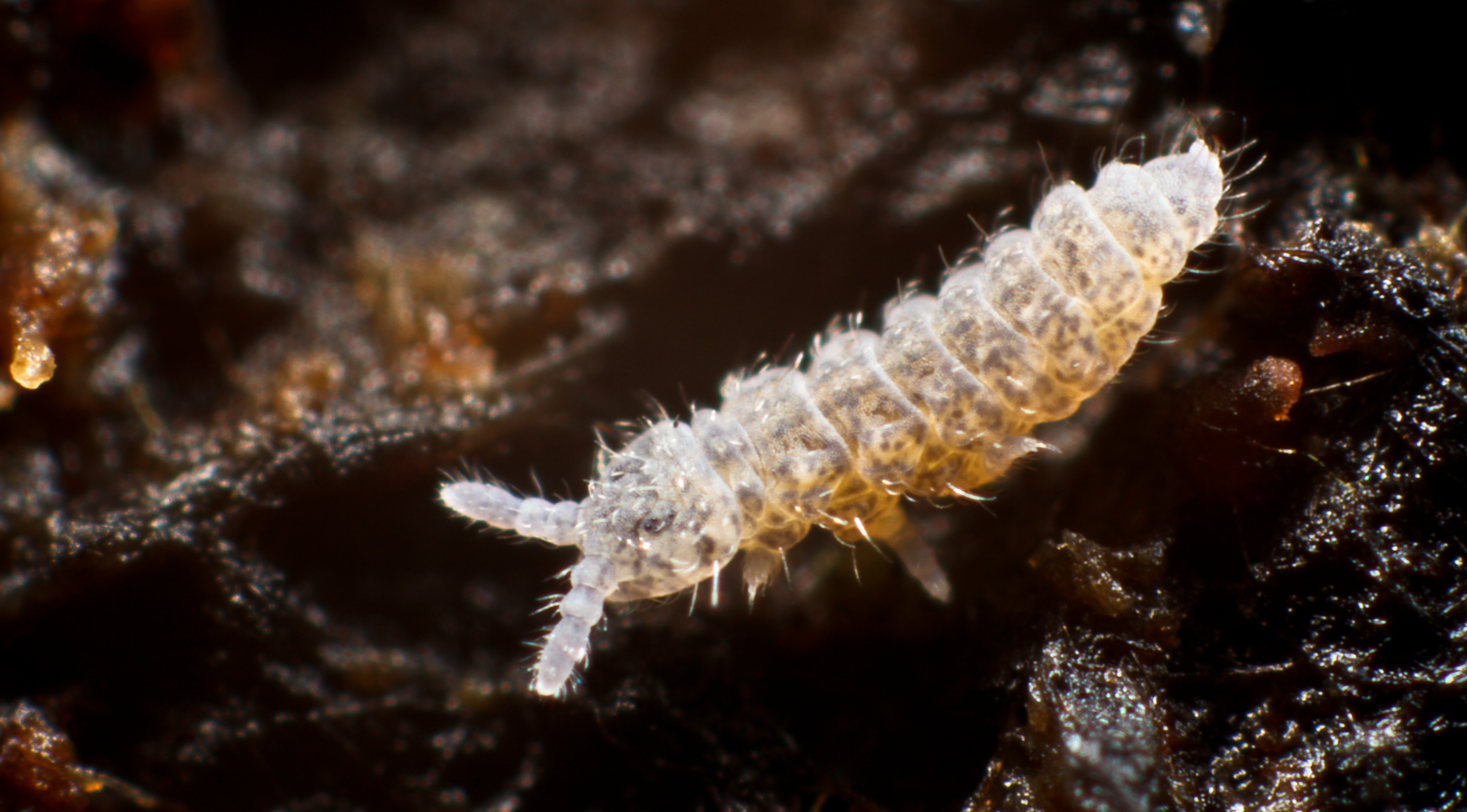
Schaefferia emucronata

The main biospeleological interest in the Boho area is the population of approximately 50 Daubenton's or Water Bats (Myotis daubentonii) which roost in the Upper Ravine Cave. These were recorded as early as 1895 by Lyster Jameson (as Vespertilio daubentonii) and specimens were sent to the then Science and Art Museum in Dublin. On this visit, Jameson and his guide, Rev. A. Knight, also identified two large spiders, Meta menardi and Meta merianae, and three additional invertebrates that were likely washed in by floods: the water bug Velia currens and two flies belonging to the genera Erioptera and Molophilus.

Lass of the University of Nottingham (in Hazelton, 1974) made extensive faunal collections in Boho Caves which included the identification of the troglobitic Springtail (Schaefferia emucronata). Phil Chapman cites the collection of a stickleback (Gasterosteus aculeatus) from Boho and the Field Shake Holes and Southern Series have been observed to support a large spider population (Meta menardi). The strong draughts may bring trogloxenes into the cave on which this population thrives. The record of the water beetle, Agabus biguttatus, was of some interest at the time of the caves' declaration as an ASSI in 1985, as there had been no other modern Irish records of this cave-dwelling species up to this point.

== See also ==
- Caves of the Tullybrack and Belmore hills
- List of caves in the United Kingdom
- List of caves
