= Clabby =

Village in County Fermanagh, Northern Ireland

Coordinates: 54.4017°N 7.3706°W

Clabby: Irish: Clabaigh
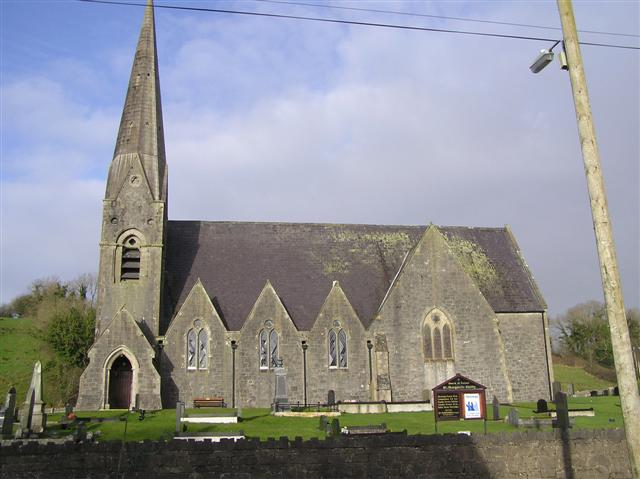
- St Margaret's Church of Ireland, Clabby

- Location within Northern Ireland
- Population: 282 (2021 census)
- Irish grid reference: H4151
  - Belfast: 67 mi (108 km)
- District: Fermanagh and Omagh
- County: County Fermanagh
- Country: Northern Ireland
- Sovereign state: United Kingdom
- Post town: FIVEMILETOWN
- Postcode district: BT75
- Dialling code: 028, +44 28
- UK Parliament: Fermanagh and South Tyrone
- NI Assembly: Fermanagh and South Tyrone

Clabby (from Irish Clabaigh, meaning 'place of pock-marked land') is a small village in County Fermanagh, Northern Ireland. It is 3 miles (5 km) north-west of Fivemiletown and 4 mi (6 km) north-east of Tempo, close to the County Tyrone boundary. The 2021 census recorded a population of 282. It is situated within Fermanagh and Omagh district.
