= Tathe =

A tathe or tate is a unit of area which was used in Fermanagh and Monaghan, equivalent to 60 Irish acres.

Four tathes make a quarter of land, four quarters make a ballibetagh and, in Fermanagh, seven ballibetaghs make a barony, of which there were seven. However, the measure of a ballybetagh is far larger in Fermanagh than in Monaghan. In total at this period in time (1609), it was estimated that Fermanagh which had 51 ballibetaghs and a half of "chargeable lands" contained the same area as Monaghan which had 100 ballibetaghs.

A quick survey of 1608 found the Tathe to be only half the extent assigned to it by the Irish which was 60 native Irish acres.
