= Herenagh =

A Herenagh was the chief elect of a sept (family group) in medieval times in Ireland, and was a lay official of church lands. The herenagh was elected by the sept and then confirmed by the bishop. If the sept did not agree with the election then the right of appointment then reverted to the bishop, dean and chapter, to be confirmed by the bishop, who still received fees. If the sept ceased to exist, the bishop did not assume power over the land, but had to elect an herenagh from another sept.
