= Knockmore =

Upland area in County Fermanagh, Northern Ireland

Coordinates: 54.402°N 7.864°W

Knockmore (from Irish Cnoc Mór 'big hill') is an upland area and townland situated in County Fermanagh, Northern Ireland outside the village of Derrygonnelly, in the historical barony of Magheraboy. This area, together with the adjacent Barrs of Boho and most of the uplands in Boho parish, are described as the Knockmore Scarplands. The focal point of the area is Knockmore summit at 277 metres (909 ft).

This area is notable for its flora and geology which is protected under an areas of special scientific interest (ASSI) designation, namely the West Fermanagh Scarplands ASSI and West Fermanagh Scarplands Special Area of Conservation (SAC). There are also a number of sites of archaeological significance, which have been recorded since the late 19th century.

== Geology ==
The Knockmore area is known for its dramatic cliffs. It also gives its name to a type of limestone described as Knockmore Limestone which contains a number of caves.

== Flora and fauna ==
The flora and fauna in this area are largely as a result of the underlying limestone and sandstone geology, consisting of upland heath mixed with calcareous grassland. The area is especially noted for the appearance of Irish eyebright (Euphrasia salisburgensis), which is considered a priority species in Northern Ireland.

== History ==
There is a mention in old tales of a castle belonging to the Flannagan Clan which was located on Knockmore.

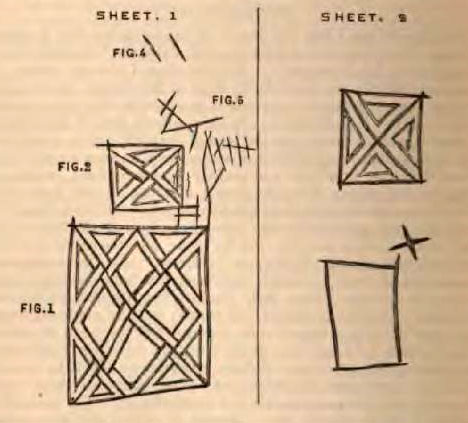
Celtic inscriptions in Gillie's Hole, as illustrated by Wakeman (1870).

=== Cave archaeology ===
The summit of Knockmore contains at least 15 small caves which have been the subject of archeological visits since the late 19th century. The most significant of these is "Lettered Cave" (or Inscribed Cave), situated 50 m from Knockmore summit, which is partially man-made. The cave is named for the art and writing of varying age inscribed on the walls, ranging from early celtic and Christian designs to simple marking of names and dates. It was investigated by William Wakeman (1866–70) and Thomas Plunkett (1870, 1878 and 1898) and is now a scheduled ancient monument.

Among the other caves studied on Knockmore is Gillie's Hole, located part-way up the southern cliff face of the summit. Named for its 18th-century occupants, reportedly a young couple ostracised by their families, the cave was discovered by Wakeman (1870) to contain further inscriptions of ancient celtic origin.

== See also ==
- List of townlands in County Fermanagh
- List of archaeological sites in County Fermanagh
- Caves of the Tullybrack and Belmore hills
