= Tullygerravra =

Townland in County Fermanagh, Northern Ireland

Coordinates: 54.37511°N 7.98217°W

Tullygerravra (from Irish Tulaigh Dhoire Bhreith 'hill of the oak-wood of the birth', IPA:[ˈt̪ˠʊliːˈɣɛɾʲəvʲɾʲɛ]) is a townland in the area of Belcoo, County Fermanagh, Northern Ireland. It used to be in the area of Boho and remains a part of the parish of Botha.

This townland is mentioned as one of the three townlands including Agho and Eoss in the parish of Botha which were removed from the barony of Magheraboy around the 1890s.

== See also ==
- List of townlands in County Fermanagh
