= George Coffey =

Irish scholar and cultural revivalist

George Coffey (1857–1916) was a scholar of Irish history and cultural revivalist.

Coffey was a bookbinder, archaeologist, and the first keeper of antiquities at the National Museum of Ireland. He was associated with the cultural revival movement and Douglas Hyde's Gaelic League and the rediscovery of the Irish language.

== Works ==
His works include :

- English and Irish Coins, A Manual for Collectors, 1882
- "Home Rule, Answers to Objections", The Irish Question, no. 30, The Irish Press Agency : London, 1888
- "How the Union was Carried", The Irish Question, no. 40, The Irish Press Agency : London, 1890
- Coffey, George (1892–1896), "On the Tumuli and Inscribed Stones at New Grange, Dowth, and Knowth", The Transactions of the Royal Irish Academy, 30, Royal Irish Academy: 1–96, JSTOR 30079776
- Coffey, George (December 1894), "The Origins of Prehistoric Ornament in Ireland", The Journal of the Royal Society of Antiquaries of Ireland, 5th series, 4 (4), Royal Society of Antiquaries of Ireland: 349–379, JSTOR 25508176
- Royal Irish Academy Collection Guide to the Celtic Antiquities of the Christian period preserved in the National Museum, Dublin, Hodges, Figgis, & Co. : Dublin; Williams & Norgate : London, 1909
- Guide to the Collection of Irish Antiquities (Royal Irish Academy Collection) : Anglo Irish Coins, 1911
- New Grange (Brugh na Boinne) and other incised tumuli in Ireland, 1912, ( reprinted by The Dolphin Press 1977 ISBN 0856420417 )
- The Bronze Age in Ireland, Hidges, Figgis, & Co. : Dublin; Simpkin, Marshall, & Co. : London, 1913
