= Glenkeel =

Glenkeel An Gleann Caol
- townland
- Coordinates: 54.410°N 7.861°W

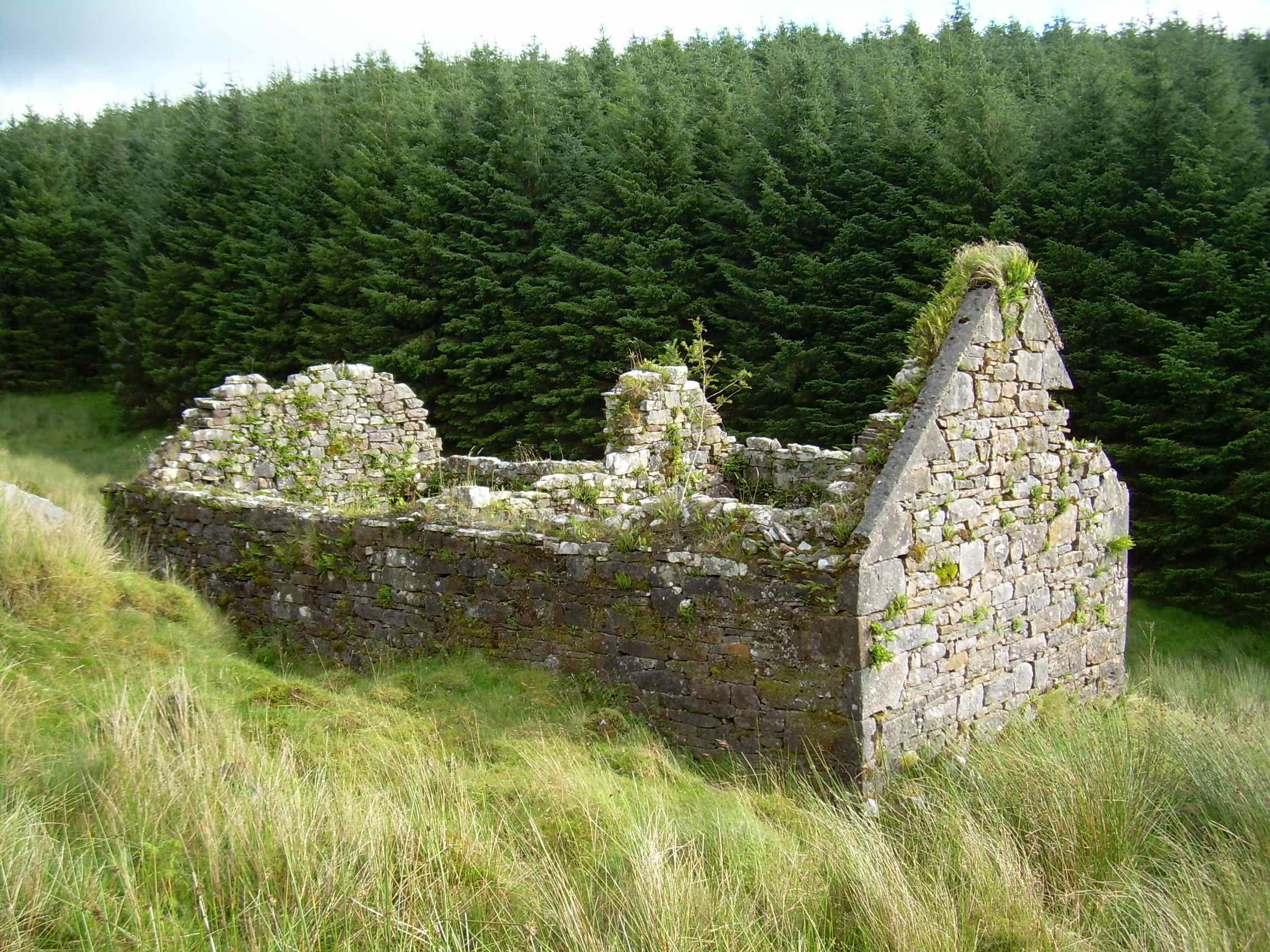
First abandoned house in Glenkeel

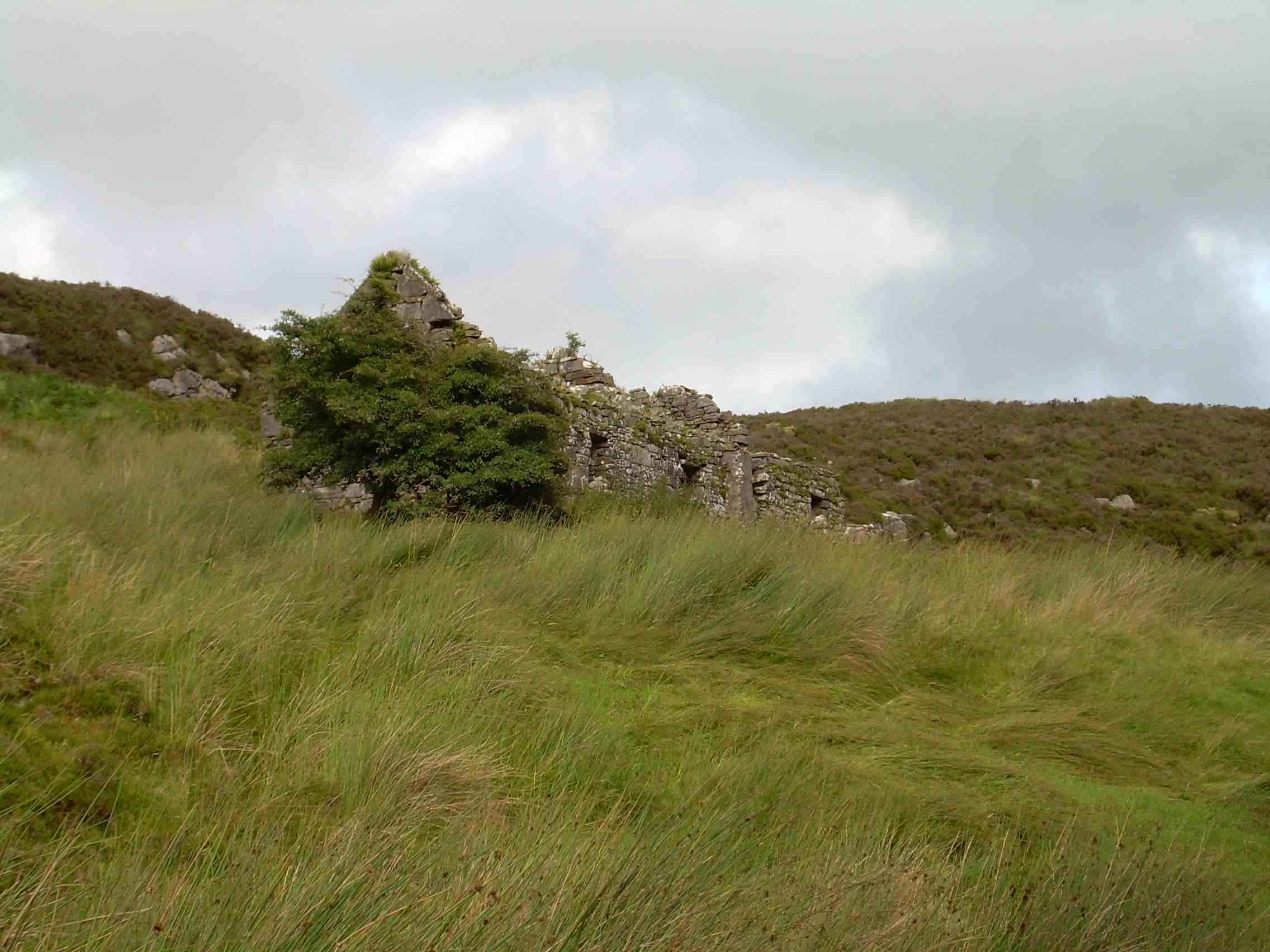
Second abandoned house in Glenkeel

Glenkeel (from Irish Gleann Caol 'narrow glen') is a townland in County Fermanagh, Northern Ireland. It is situated in the south-west corner of the civil parish of Boho, in the land division of Old Barr, in the former barony of Magheraboy. It is situated within Fermanagh and Omagh district.

Glenkeel is divided into the sub-townlands of Carrickaphreghaun, Carricknaboll, Cloghernavea, Lough Acrottan, Teeroe and Tullyveeny.

This area is notable for its geological Karst features notably forming part of the Reyfad-Glenkeel cave system and Reyfad-Carrickbeg system. Glenkeel hill (373 m (1,224 ft)) is mentioned in several historical texts. The area still retains the tradition of peat cutting.

== Etymology ==
Other historical forms/interpretations of the name Glenkeel have included An Gleann Caol, meaning "the glen of the slender person" (1833) or "the narrow glen" (Joyce, 1875).

Other authors have stated that the name may derive from Bragbaid-na-Caoile. The caol being after an extraordinary monstrous serpent which spent its days in Monaghan consuming a great deal of the local produce and then it would proceed through (gleann-na-Caoile (Glenkeel, near Louch Erne, on the western side, towards Leitrim) to a nighttime resting place. This continued until the arrival of St Patrick who put an end to the serpent and its travels at Lough Derg.

== See also ==
- List of townlands in County Fermanagh
