= Sillees River =

River in County Fermanagh, Northern Ireland, part of the Erne system

Coordinates: 54°20′N 7°38′W

The Sillees River (Irish: Abhainn na Sailchis meaning "the sally kesh river") is located in south-western County Fermanagh. Its origins lie in Lough Ahork, which is located in Lough Navar Forest (Coill Loch na bhFear). From here it continues through Correl Glen, Derrygonnelly and the Boho countryside, passing through both Carran and Ross Loughs where it ends in Lower Lough Erne.

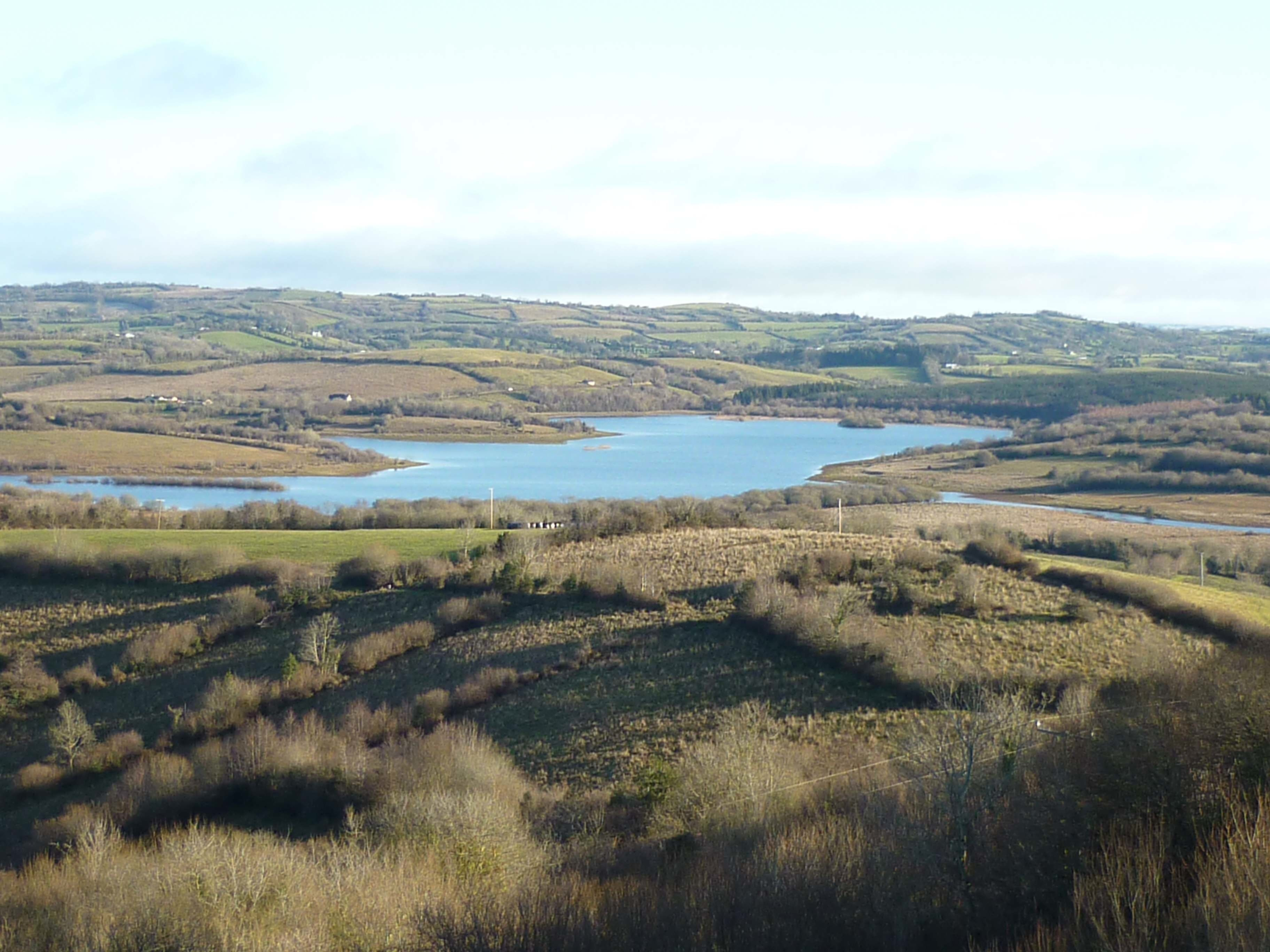
Ross Lough in Boho

There are a few tributary streams and rivers that flow into the Sillees river, amongst them the Boho River, the Screenagh, which emerges from the Arch cave, and the Reyfad Stream, which enters Pollytullybrack of the Reyfad cave system.

== Folk tales associated with the river ==
The river is famous for the curse which was given by St Faber, when she changed its direction, making the river bad for fishing and good for drowning.

In another tale of the river, there is a highwayman known as Black Francis Corrigan, who leaps the Sillees in a single bound with his horse after a famous robbery.

== Geological and palaeontological interest ==
The Sillees River has the distinction of having a species of brachiopod named after it, namely Rugosochonetes silleesi. Indeed, some 56 species of early Carboniferous brachiopods alone were discovered in this area as well as 69 species of bryozoans.
