= Letterbreen =

Village in County Fermanagh, Northern Ireland

Coordinates: 54.310°N 7.735°W

Letterbreen: Irish: Leitir Bhruín
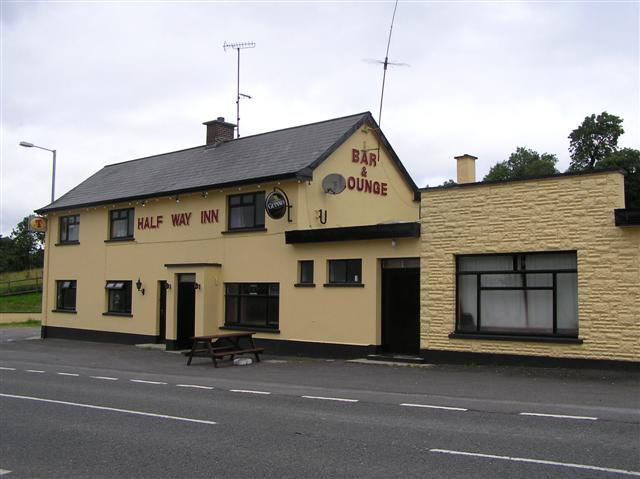
- Half Way Inn

- Location within Northern Ireland
- District: Fermanagh and Omagh
- County: County Fermanagh
- Country: Northern Ireland
- Sovereign state: United Kingdom
- Postcode district: BT
- Dialling code: 028
- UK Parliament: Fermanagh and South Tyrone
- NI Assembly: Fermanagh and South Tyrone

Letterbreen (from Irish Leitir Bhruín, meaning 'Bruín's hillside') is a small village in County Fermanagh, Northern Ireland. It is 5 miles southwest of Enniskillen on the main route to Sligo. It lies in the foothills of Belmore Mountain.

The village has a Methodist church built in 1885, a Church of Ireland church hall, a shop, a post office, a pub and several houses. It is served by a primary school at nearby Florencecourt. Letterbreen Court House was located a mile west of Letterbreen crossroads, in one of the wings of Summerhill house.

== Transport ==
Letterbreen is a request stop on the Bus Éireann Sligo-Manorhamilton-Enniskillen Expressway route 66. The coach stops at Sligo bus station which is beside Sligo railway station. Connecting trains from Sligo run to Dublin Connolly.

== Demographics ==
The 2011 census combined the villages of Boho, Cleenish and Letterbeen into the same ward. On Census Day (27 March 2011) the usually resident population of Boho Cleenish And Letterbreen Ward was 3,185 accounting for 0.18% of the NI total.

- 99.40% were from the white (including Irish Traveller) ethnic group;
- 55.23% belong to or were brought up in the Catholic religion and 41.22% belong to or were brought up in a 'Protestant and Other Christian (including Christian related)' religion; and
- 38.15% indicated that they had a British national identity, 36.73% had an Irish national identity and 31.15% had a Northern Irish national identity. (Respondents could indicate more than one national identity.)
- Considering the population aged 3 years old and over:
  - 11.88% had some knowledge of Irish;
  - 4.13% had some knowledge of Ulster-Scots; and
  - 0.85% did not have English as their first language.
