= Moylehid =

- Townland
- Coordinates: 54.32784°N 7.77446°W
- Country: Northern Ireland
- Civil parish: Boho

Moylehid (from Irish Mulleithid/Maol Leathan 'broad bare hill') is a townland in County Fermanagh, Northern Ireland. It is in the civil parish of Boho. This townland has also been variously known as Moylehide (1609), Moolet (1659), Moylehit, Mullyleet, Mul Leathaid and Mul-leithid (hill of breadth) (1834).

== History ==
Mylehid townland contains two scheduled historic monuments as described on the Northern Ireland Environment Agency, DOE, Scheduled Historic Monuments list (1 April 2015). These are the Eagle's Knoll Cairn passage tomb and the Moylehid ring cairn. Both sites were discovered by archaeologist Thomas Plunkett in 1894 and contain evidence of Neolithic settlement.

One of these cairns is situated on an eastern spur of Belmore Mountain overlooking the Erne valley and has the appearance of an overgrown boss of cherty limestone.

The cairn or passage grave is laid out in a cross shaped arrangement, 13 ft long and 7 ft 4 inches wide and divided into 7 areas.

A number of artifacts have been discovered in these chambers including cremated and uncremated bones, ornamented stone beads, human skulls, animals bones such as birds, boars, sea shells, a stone hammer and ornamented urns (which are on display in the National Museum of Ireland Dublin).

Moylehid is also the location of the Templemullen chapel of ease, also known as the Church of the Mill which was the property of the Lisgoole Abbey.
