= Noon's Hole =

Cave in Northern Ireland

Noon's Hole (Sumera) – Arch Cave
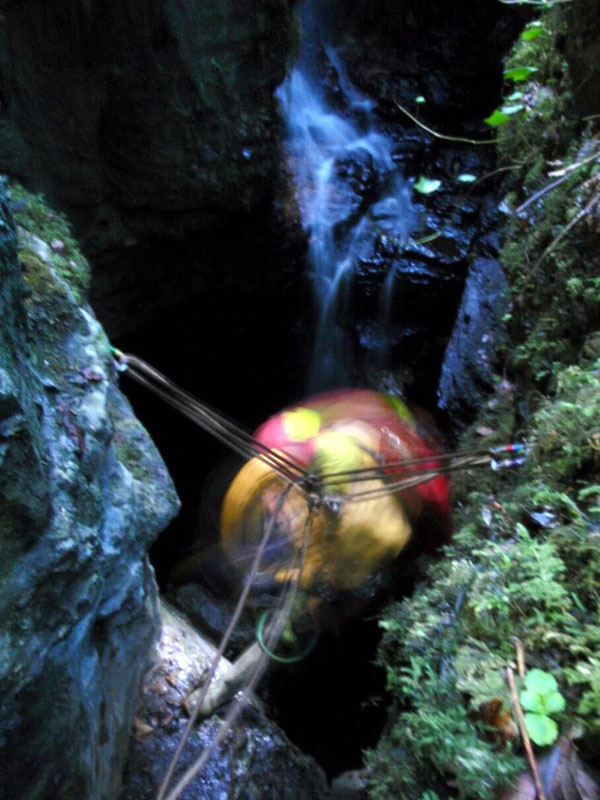
- Caver rigging the entrance of Noone's Hole
- Interactive map of Noon's Hole (Sumera) – Arch Cave
- Location: Devenish, County Fermanagh, Northern Ireland
- Coordinates: 54°23′00″N 7°51′24″W
- Depth: 108 m (354 ft)
- Length: 3.7 km (2.3 mi)
- Discovery: 1895 onwards
- Geology: Limestone
- Entrances: 2
- Entrances list: Noon's Hole, Arch Cave
- Difficulty: High
- Hazards: Verticality & water

Noon's Hole (Irish grid ref H12684431) lies about 5 km northwest of the centre of Boho, in the townland of Old Barr in the civil parish of Devenish, County Fermanagh, Northern Ireland, close to the border with Boho parish. The cave is under part of the escarpment on the east side of the Glenade Sandstone uplands. At 81 m (266 ft), this pothole was thought to have the deepest shaft in Ireland, but this honour was passed to the nearby Reyfad Pot, which contains an entrance shaft of 88 m (289 ft). The continuation of the cave system (incorporating the Afternoon Series and High Noon's) contains 3.7 km (2.3 mi) of passage, and it connects to the resurgence at Arch Cave through three cave dives, making this system the 8th deepest in Ireland, at 108 m (354 ft).

Noon's Hole was previously called "Sumera", meaning "abyss", but gained notoriety and a new name in the 1820s, following the notorious murder of Dominick Noone, whose body was thrown into the cave. Ordnance Survey maps still use both names.

== Exploration ==
A Sumera is a bottomless pit, and locals initially treated Noon's Hole as a supernatural area, viewing it with suspicion and fear. However, in August 1895, the French cave explorer Édouard-Alfred Martel explored the cave for the first time, descending to 20 metres (66 ft). It was not until 1912 that a group called the Yorkshire Ramblers reached the bottom. Not discouraged by their equipment not having arrived from England, they made the descent of the complex 78 metres (256 ft) shaft using a 35 metres (115 ft) long rope ladder built from materials purchased from Fermanagh ships chandlers and timber merchants, hauling it up and down from the surface when the explorers found ledges to stand on. All they found at the bottom was a short passage leading to a sump. In January 1970 a group from the University of Leeds Speleological Association investigated the parallel shafts, and found that one led into 400 metres (1,300 ft) of passages they named the After-Noon Series.

In the meanwhile, cave divers had been pushing in Arch Cave from which the water from Noon's Hole resurges. In 1972 Martyn Farr and Roger Solari passed an 80 metres (260 ft) sump into a long canal, and then a 8 metres (26 ft) sump into a major extension which extended into the mountain for a further 1,500 metres (1,600 yd) to a third sump. The pair returned in 1973, and after a 49 metres (161 ft) dive they emerged into the After-Noon series of Noon's Hole.

Easter 1975 a party followed a draught in the After-Noon series through a rocky crawl, to break out into a mile of new passage which included a streamway, the terminal sump of which corresponded to a sump with the main water flow in Arch II cave. This was named the High Noon Series. In 1984, a group managed to find a dry connection between High Noon and Arch II cave to create the 'finest sporting trip in County Fermanagh'.

== Dominick Noone ==
Dominick Noone was originally from the Ballinamore area in the east of County Leitrim. Whilst in Derrygonnelly, he became a member of an illegal Catholic organisation known as the Ribbonmen, an agrarian reform group, but subsequently became an informer for the British Crown. It was on his evidence in 1826 that a number of fellow members were 'transported' to Australia. Despite police protection, he was invited to a wedding party, but then kidnapped and murdered and his body thrown down into the depths of the Sumera. The authorities suspected that his body lay in the shaft, and a man named Cavanagh from Castlecoole, a townland on the outskirts of Enniskillen, accepted a substantial reward to descend the shaft in a rope and creel. Noone's body was found at a depth of 190 feet (58 m), and retrieved. The body was then carried to a chapel for a wake but local people blocked the doorway preventing entrance. The murderers of Noone were never caught despite the offer of a £100 award.

In 1879 a long ballad was composed about the event. The penultimate verse goes:

Within the mountain nature made,
A deep and dismal cave,
That suited well the murderers said,
To be a traitor's grave,
They flung the lifeless body below -
A groan they thought it gave.

== See also ==
- Caves of the Tullybrack and Belmore hills
- List of caves in the United Kingdom
