= Springfield, County Fermanagh =

Coordinates: 54.392°N 7.697°W

Springfield is a small village in County Fermanagh, Northern Ireland, near Enniskillen and Lough Erne. In the 2021 census, it had a population of 69 people. It is situated in the Fermanagh and Omagh District Council area.

== See also ==
- List of villages in Northern Ireland
- List of towns in Northern Ireland
