= Reyfad =

Coordinates: 54.3641°N 7.8298°W

Reyfad Ráth Fada
- Townland
- Etymology: "Long fort"
- Interactive map of Reyfad
- Country: Northern Ireland
- County: Fermanagh
- Highest elevation: 398 m (1,306 ft)

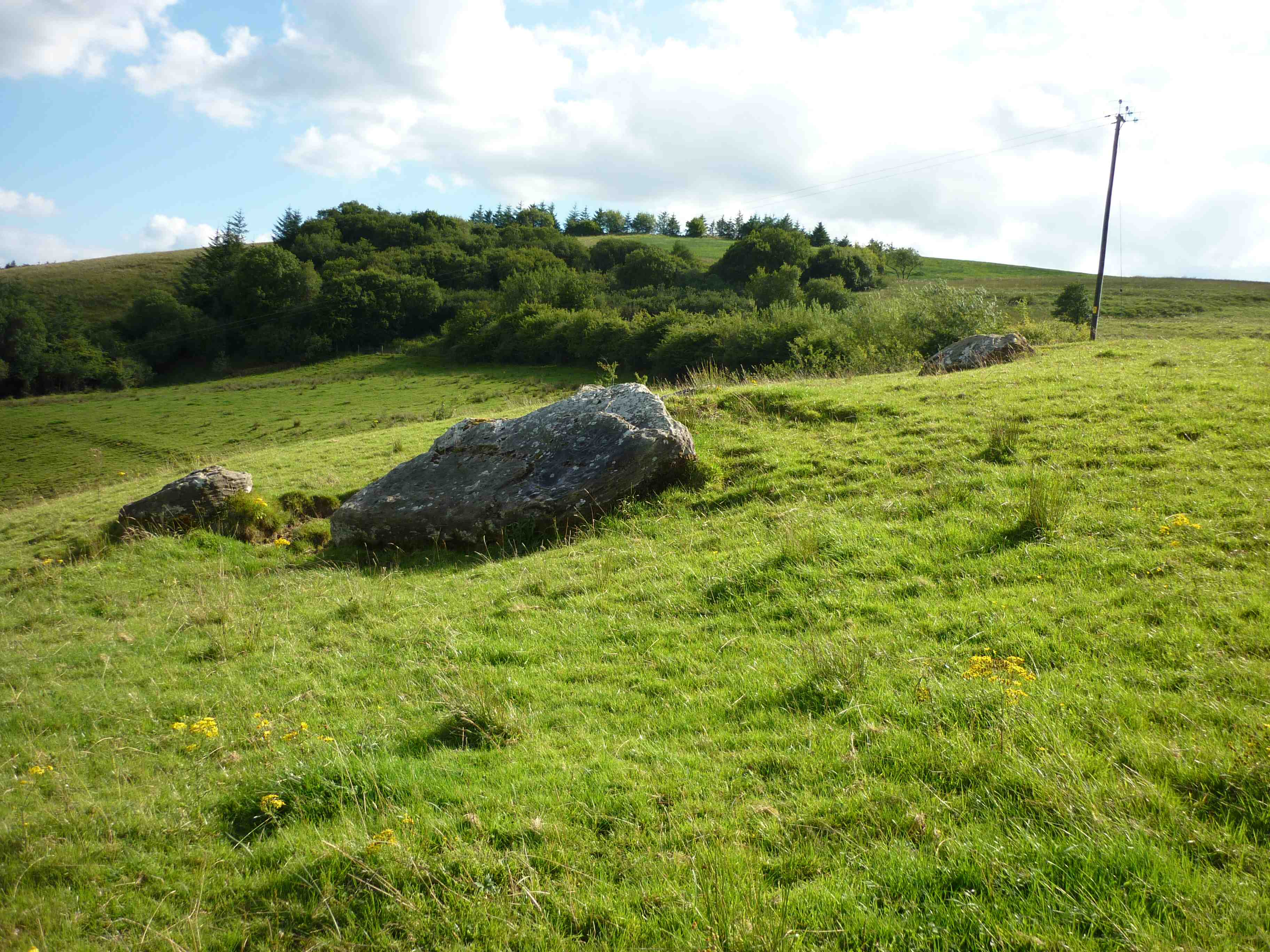
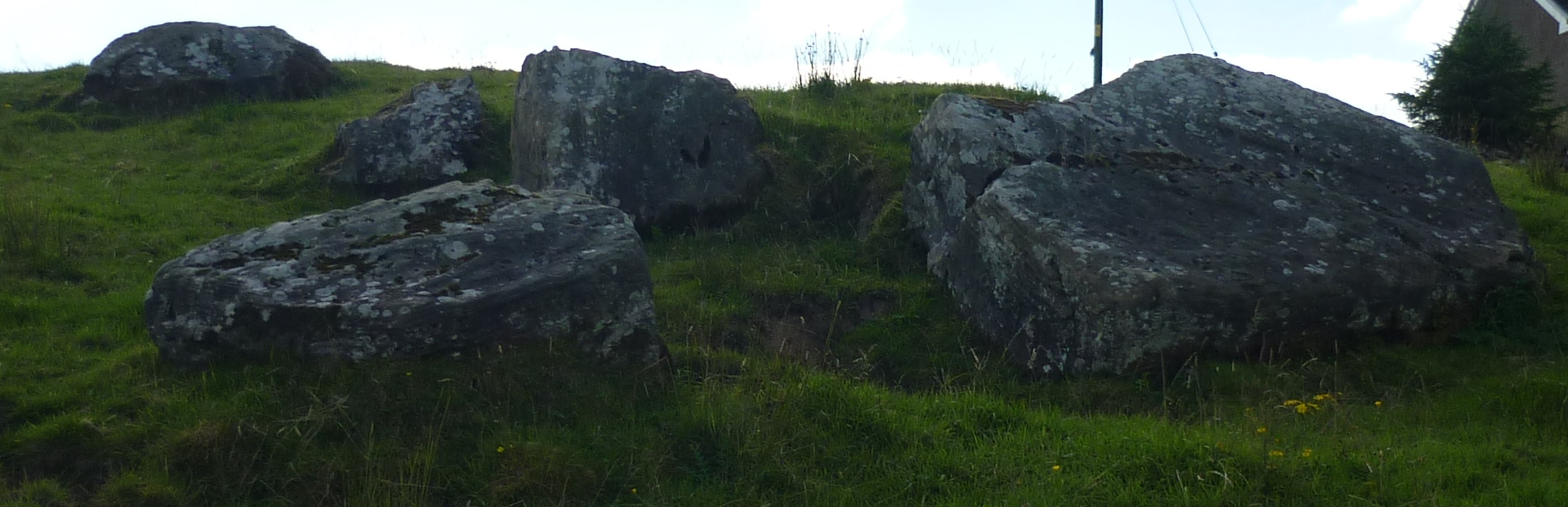

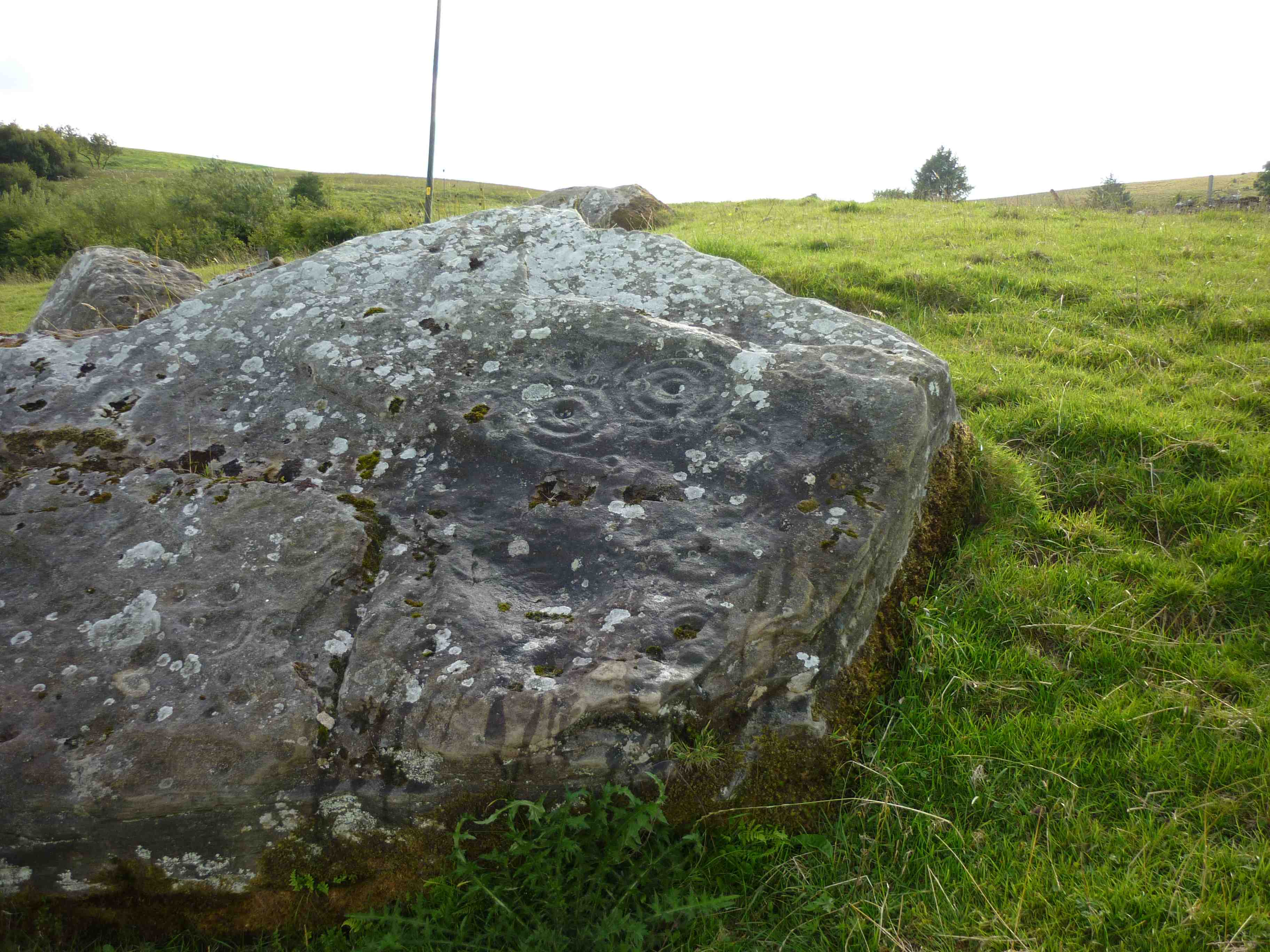
Curvilinear art

Reyfad (from Irish Ráth Fada 'long fort') is a townland in County Fermanagh, Northern Ireland. It lies in the land division of Old Barr, in the civil parish of Boho. The townland has previously been called Rayfadd - 1659, Raffada (Magheryboy) - 1672 and Ráith Fada "long fort" - 1833.

This high plateau is known for its extensive cave system (see Caves of the Tullybrack and Belmore hills) and Neolithic stones.

The summit of a nearby hill is known as Tullybrack or Reyfad Mountain (398 metres (1,306 ft)) but it is in fact situated in the townland of Aghamore, County Fermanagh, also within the Boho area.

== History ==
Nearby to Tullybrack summit lies Two Dogs (derived from the Irish: Sliabh Dá Chon meaning "the hill of the two hounds"), which was the site of an ancient clan battle, as recorded in the Annals of the Four Masters:

A great number of the men of Breifny (Note: See Breifne.) were disabled and slain by Muinter-Feodachain, on the hill of Odhra, in Sliabh-da-Chon. They lost no less than forty men, together with Conor, the son of Donnell Mac Sweeny, who had gone on that incursion through folly and youth. Some of the men of Dartry, and others of the people of the Clann-Hugh Maguire, were slain there.

== Reyfad Stones ==
The Reyfad Stones are six stones on the side of a hill, five of which have curvilinear cup and ring markings which date from the Neolithic to the Iron Age, about 5000 years ago. They are located behind the Sacred Heart Church in Boho (OS Ref (GB): H112462 / Sheet: 17). These are designated as a scheduled monument (SM 210:13) by the Environment and Heritage service at the Department of the Environment. The largest stone measures over 3 by 2 metres (10 ft × 7 ft) and has megalithic inscriptions all across its surface; this pattern is inscribed deeper on the smaller stones. Similar megalithic art found at Newgrange, Knowth and Dowth is dated circa 3200 BC.

== Reyfad cave system ==
Reyfad high plateau is known for its extensive cave system (see Caves of the Tullybrack and Belmore hills) and Neolithic stones.

=== Little Reyfad ===
Grid ref: H096465. The rocks of this sinkhole consist of Dartry Limestone, Knockmore Limestone and chert. The site has been designated a PASSI. Little Reyfad is at the base of a shakehole. A series of descents (7 m) leads to a floor of broken chert, followed by a further 3 metre difficult descent to another base, which is blocked with a rock and gravel.

=== Reyfad Pot (Pota Raith Fada) ===
Grid ref: H08894687. The rocks from this formation comprise Carn and Dartry Limestones with some Glenade Sandstone. Breccia, chert, calcite and gypsum deposits can also be found.

This cave is noted by the Northern Ireland Environment Agency as being the most important underground karst site in Northern Ireland. At 193 metres (633 ft) deep and 6.7 kilometres (4.2 mi) long, it is the deepest cave system in Ireland and the second-longest in Northern Ireland. This site is a PASSI and is a very active cave with many calcite formations and fossiliferous limestone, which includes evidence of Brachiopods and Crinoids. The extended area is hypothesised to have formed from the last glacial period (Pleistocene).

Access is by permission of landowner only.
