= Fermanagh and Omagh =

Local government district in Northern Ireland

Fermanagh and Omagh: Irish: Fear Manach agus An Ómaigh; Ulster Scots: Fermanay an Omey
- District
- Fermanagh and Omagh shown within Northern Ireland
- Coordinates: 54.545°N 7.494°W
- Sovereign state: United Kingdom
- Country: Northern Ireland
- Incorporated: 1 April 2015
- Named for: Fermanagh District and Omagh District
- Administrative HQ: The Grange, Omagh and the Townhall, Enniskillen

Government
  - Type: District council
  - Body: Fermanagh and Omagh District Council
  - Executive: Committee system
  - Control: Sinn Féin

Area
  - Total: 1,095 sq mi (2,836 km^{2})
  - Rank: 1st

Population (2024)
  - Total: 117,687
  - Rank: 11th
  - Density: 110/sq mi (41/km^{2})
- Time zone: UTC+0 (GMT)
  - Summer (DST): UTC+1 (BST)
- Postcode areas: BT
- Dialling codes: 028
- ISO 3166 code: GB-FMO
- GSS code: N09000006
- Website: fermanaghomagh.com

Fermanagh and Omagh is a local government district that was created on 1 April 2015 by merging Fermanagh District and Omagh District. It covers most of the Southwest of Northern Ireland. The local authority is Fermanagh and Omagh District Council, which likewise replaced Fermanagh District Council and Omagh District Council.

== Geography ==
It is located in the southwest of Northern Ireland, covering all of County Fermanagh and parts of County Tyrone. It borders counties Donegal, Leitrim, Cavan and Monaghan in the Republic of Ireland. The name of the new district was announced on 17 September 2008.

== Fermanagh and Omagh District Council ==
Fermanagh and Omagh District Council replaced Fermanagh District Council and Omagh District Council. The first election for the new district council was originally due to take place in May 2009, but in April 2008 Shaun Woodward, Secretary of State for Northern Ireland, announced that the scheduled 2009 district council elections were to be postponed until 2011. The first elections took place on 22 May 2014 and the council acted as a shadow authority until 1 April 2015.

== See also ==
- Local government in Northern Ireland
