= List of townlands of County Fermanagh =

In Ireland, counties are divided into civil parishes, and parishes are further divided into townlands. The following is a list of townlands in County Fermanagh, Northern Ireland:

== A ==
Abocurragh, Abohill, Acres, Aghaboy, Aghacramphill, Aghaderryloman, Aghadreenan Glebe, Aghadrum, Aghadrumsee and Killygorman, Aghagaffert, Aghagay, Aghagrefin, Aghahannagh, Aghaherrish, Aghahoorin, Aghakeeran, Aghakillymaude, Aghalaan, Aghalane, Aghalun, Aghalurcher Glebe, Aghaleague, Aghama, Aghameelan, Aghamore, Aghamore North, Aghamore South, Aghamuldowney, Aghanaglack, Aghanaglogh, Aghannagh, Agharahan, Agharainy, Agharoosky, Agharoosky East, Agharoosky West, Aghatirourke, Aghavea Glebe, Aghavoory, Aghavore, Aghaweenagh, Agheeghter, Aghindaiagh, Aghindisert, Aghinish Island, Aghintra, Aghinure, Aghinver, Aghnablaney, Aghnacarra, Aghnachuill, Aghnacloy, Aghnacloy North, Aghnacloy South, Aghnagrane, Aghnahinch, Aghnahoo, Aghnaloo, Aghnashammer, Aghnaskew, Aghnaskew Glebe, Agho, Aghyoule, Altagoaghan, Altawark, Altmartin, Altnaponer, Annachullion Glebe, Annaghard, Annaghilly North, Annaghilly South, Annaghkeel, Annaghlee, Annaghmartin, Annaghmore, Annaghmullin, Annagolgan, Annahervy, Annahone, Annashanco, Annynanum, Arda, Ardatrave, Ardees Glebe, Ardees Upper, Ardgart, Ardlougher, Ardmoney, Ardmore, Ardore, Ardshankill, Ardtonnagh, Ardunshin, Ardvarny West, Arlish, Arnot's Grove, Artinagh, Ashwoods or Woody Mullaghree, Askill, Atnamollyboy, Attybaron, Attyclannabryan, Aughaward, Aughey, Aughlish, Aughrim

== B ==
Backwood, Ballagh, Ballaghgee, Ballaghmore, Ballindullagh Outward, Ballintarsan, Ballintempo, Ballycassidy, Ballydoolagh, Ballygonnell, Ballyhill, Ballyhose, Ballyhullagh, Ballylucas, Ballymacaffry, Ballymacataggart, Ballymagaghran Island, Ballymakenny, Ballynabrannagh, Ballynakill, Ballynant, Ballyreagh, Ballysooragh, Ballysroonagh, Ballywillin, Baltreagh, Banagher, Bannagh More, Baragh, Barnalackan, Barnhill, Barr of Bolusty More, Barr of Drumbadmeen, Barr of Drumgormly, Barr of Ramoan, Barr of Slattinagh, Barr of Slawin, Beagh, Beagh Little, Beagho, Beihy, Belcoo West, Bellanadohy, Bellanaleck, Bellanamallard, Belleisle, Bellmount, Belview or Drumcoo, Bess Island, Bigwood, Bilberry Island, Bingham's Rock, Binmore Glebe, Blackhill, Black Rock, Blackslee, Blaney Island, Bleanish Island, Bloomfield's Rock, Blunnick, Boa Island, Bockan Island, Bodarra Little, Bohasset, Bohattan, Bohevny, Bohora, Bohulkin, Boleyhill, Bolusty More, Bonnybrook, Boolawater, Bosallagh, Boshinny, Bowara, Bowarran, Boyaghan, Boyhill, Braade, Brackagh, Bracklin, Bracky, Brannish, Breagho, Breandrum, Brobrohan, Brockagh, Brollagh, Brookfield, Brookhill, Broughderg, Brougher, Brownhill, Brughas, Bruscarnagh, Buck Islands or Garrow, Buck Island, Buggan, Bumper Lodge or Mullan, Bun, Bunaninver, Buninubber, Bunlougher, Bunmichael, Bunnablaneybane, Bunnahesco, Bunnahola Island, Bunnahone, Bunneill, Bunnisnagapple, Burfits Hill

== C ==
Cackinish, Cady, Cahore, Caldragh, Caldrum Glebe, Calkill, Callagheen, Callow, Callowhill, Cam, Camgart, Camletter, Camplagh, Camplany, Cantytrindle, Cappog, Cappy, Captain's Island, Carickaleese, Car Island, Carn, Carneyhill, Carneyhome, Carnirk, Carnmore, Carntrone, Carr, Carra, Carran, Carran Beg, Carran East, Carran Little, Carran More, Carran West, Carranboy, Carrick, Carrickabweehan, Carrickadrantan, Carrickagreany, Carrickaheenan, Carrickaloughan, Carrickawick, Carrickbeg, Carrickcroghery, Carrickmacflaherty, Carrickmacrourk, Carrickmacsparrow, Carrickmacosker, Carricknabrattoge, Carricknaseer, Carrickoughter, Carrickpolin, Carrickreagh, Carrickyheenan, Carrigan, Carrigans, Carrigolagh, Carrontreemall, Carrowcarlan, Carrowgarragh, Carrowmaculla, Carrowmore, Carrownalegg, Carrowhony, Carrowkeel, Carrowmacmea, Carrownagiltagh, Carry, Cashel, Cashelnadrea, Cassan, Cassidy, Castle Balfour, Castle Coole, Castle Irvine Demesne, Castletown Monea, Cavanacross, Cavanacurragh, Cavanagarvan, Cavanagh, Cavanakeery, Cavanaleck, Cavanalough Glebe, Cavancarragh, Cavanmore, Cavanreagh, Cavans, Cavantillycormick, Cavantreeduff, Chanterhill or Moneynoe Glebe, Clahernagh, Claragh, Claraghy, Claranagh, Clareview, Clay, Cleen, Cleenagh, Cleenaghan, Cleenish (Island), Cleenishgarve and Deerahan Islands, Cleenishmeen Island, Cleenriss, Cleens Old, Cleffany, Cleggan, Clenaghisle, Clevaghy, Cloghagaddy, Cloghan, Cloghanagh, Cloghbally, Cloghcor, Clogher, Clogherbog, Cloghmore, Cloghoge, Cloghtate, Cloghtogle, Clonagun, Clonamullog, Clonatty, Clonaweel, Clonbunniagh, Cloncah Rock, Cloncallick, Cloncarn, Cloncloghy, Cloncoohy, Cloncorick, Cloncorr, Clondaval, Clonee, Clonelly, Clonelty, Clonfad, Clonfane, Clonfard, Clonfeile, Clongowna, Clonkee, Clonliff, Clonmacfelimy, Clonmackan, Clonmaulin, Clonmin Glebe, Clonnaroo, Clonshannagh, Clontelaghan, Clontivrin, Clonturkle, Clontycoora, Clontyferagh, Clontymore, Clontymullan, Clonumphry, Clonursan Glebe, Cloon, Cloonacarn, Cloonatreane, Cloonatrig, Cloonatumpher, Cloonaveel, Cloonavoan, Cloy, Clyhannagh, Coa, Coagh, Coaghan, Coalhill, Coasan, Coghran's Island, Colebrook Demesne, Cole's Hill, Comaghy, Commons, Conagher, Concaroe, Conckera, Conerick, Coney Island, Congo, Coolacrim, Coolaghty, Coolaness, Coolaran, Coolarkan, Coolbeg, Coolbuck, Coolcoghill, Coolcran, Coolcrannel, Coolgarran, Coolisk, Coollane, Coolinfin Glebe, Coolkill, Coolnagrane, Coolnalong, Coolnamarrow, Coolnashanton, Coolnasillagh, Coolrakelly, Cooltrain, Cooltrane, Coolyermer, Cooneen, Coragh, Coragh (Crawford), Coragh Glebe, Corbane, Cordarragh, Cordoolagh, Cordwood, Corfannan, Corflugh, Corgary, Corlacky, Corlaghaloon, Corlaght East, Corlaght West, Corlatt, Corlave, Corlough, Cormonalea, Cornabrass, Cornacaghan, Cornaclare or Johnstown, Cornacrea, Cornacreeve, Cornacully, Cornadarum, Cornafannoge, Cornagee, Cornagun, Cornahaltie, Cornahawla, Cornahoule, Cornakessagh, Cornakill, Cornaleck, Cornamramurry, Cornamucklagh, Cornanoe, Cornarooslan, Cornashannel, Cornashee, Cornashesko, Cornaskeoge, Cornavray, Corrachrow, Corraclare, Corraclare Big, Corraclare Little, Corraclare North, Corracloon, Corracoash, Corraderrybrock, Corradillar, Corradreenan East, Corradovar, Corraghy, Corraglass, Corraglass West, Corragole, Corragunt, Corraharra, Corraheen, Corrakeel, Corrakelly, Corralea, Corraleek, Corralinnen, Corralongford, Corrameen, Corramonaghan, Corramore, Corranaheen, Corranewy, Corranny, Corrard, Corrardaghy, Corrardreen, Corrateskin, Corratistune, Corratrasna, Corravehy, Corrawully, Correen, Correll, Corrinshigo, Corry, Corsale, Corscreenagh, Corsenshin, Cortaher, Cortrasna, Cosbystown, Cosbystown East or Rosspoint, Cossycon, Craghan, Cran, Crannoges, Crawfords Hill, Creagh, Creaghamanone Island, Creaghanameelta Island, Creaghananure Island, Creaghanarourke Island, Creaghanchreesty Island, Creaghawaddy Island, Creaghmacwallen Island, Creaghnarourk Island, Creefin Island, Creenagho, Creevehill, Crehan Island, Crevinish, Crevinishaughy Island, Crillan, Crimlin, Croaghan, Croaghrim, Crockada, Crockadreen, Crockaleen, Crockaness, Crockareddy, Crockarevan, Crockateggal, Crockawaddy Glebe, Crockerahoas, Crocknaboghil, Crocknacreevy, Crocknagowan, Crocknagrally, Crocknagross, Crocknakeeragh, Crocknakelly Glebe, Crocknanane, Crom, Cromaghy, Croneen, Croostan, Cross, Crossmurrin, Crott, Crottan, Crownhall, Crummer, Crummy, Cruninish Island, Cruntully, Culky, Cules Long, Cullaghmore, Cullatagh, Culleen, Cullen, Cullentragh, Culliagh, Cullion, Culliondoo, Cultiagh, Curley's Rock, Curragh, Curraghanall, Curraghfad, Curraghlare, Curraghmore, Currin, Currogs, Curryann, Cushrush Island, Cushwash, Cuslea

== D ==
Dairies Big, Davy's Island or Inishmore, Deal Island, Deerahan and Cleenishgarve Islands, Deerpark, Deer Park, Demesne, Dernabacky, Dernacapplekeagh, Dernaglug and Drumaa, Dernagore, Dernashesk, Dernish Island, Derreens East, Derreens West, Derrin, Derrintony, Derry, Derryad, Derryargon, Derry Beg, Derry More, Derryaghna, Derryany, Derryard, Derryart, Derryasna, Derrybeg, Derrybeg East, Derrybeg West, Derrybrack, Derrybrick, Derrybrusk, Derrycallaghan, Derrycanon, Derrychaan, Derrychara, Derrychoran, Derrychree, Derrychulla, Derrychulloo, Derrychurra, Derryclawan, Derryclegna, Derrycorban, Derrycorby, Derrycormick, Derrycree, Derrycrum, Derrycullion, Derrydoon, Derryelvin, Derrygannon, Derrygelly, Derrygennedy, Derrygiff, Derrygoas, Derrygonnelly, Derrygore, Derrygurdry, Derryharney, Derryhawlagh, Derryheanlisk, Derryheely, Derryhenny, Derryhevlin Glebe, Derryhillagh, Derryhoney, Derryhooly, Derryhowlaght East, Derryhowlaght West, Derryhurdin, Derryinch, Derrykeeghan, Derrykeny, Derrykerrib, Derrylaney, Derrylea, Derryleague, Derryleck, Derrylester, Derrylin, Derryloman, Derryloo, Derrylougher, Derrymacausey, Derrymacrow, Derrymakeen, Derrymeen, Derrynacloy, Derrynacrannog, Derrynacross, Derrynafaugher, Derrynameeo, Derrynanny, Derrynashesk, Derrynavogy, Derrynawilt East, Derrynawilt West, Derryneese, Derryneeve, Derrynim, Derrynure, Derryraghan, Derryree, Derryrona Glebe, Derryscobe, Derryshandra, Derrysteaton, Derryvahon, Derryvary Beg, Derryveone, Derryvogue, Derryvolan, Derryvore, Derryvrane, Derryvree, Derryvullan, Devenish (Island), Dinnydoon, Diviny, Doagh Glebe, Dog Big, Donagh, Donegall, Doocharn, Doocharn Island, Doochrock, Dooederny, Doogary, Doohat, Doohatty Glebe, Dooletter, Doon, Doon and Eshcleagh, Doonan, Dooneen, Dooraa North, Dooross, Dornogagh, Dragh, Dreenan, Dressoge, Dresternan, Dring, Drogan, Droles, Dromore, Dromore Big, Drumaa, Drumaa and Dernaglug, Drumacrittin, Drumad, Drumadagarve, Drumadillar, Drumadown, Drumadraghy, Drumadravy, Drumady, Drumageever, Drumane, Drumanure, Drumany, Drumany Beg, Drumany More, Drumaran, Drumaraw, Drumard, Drumarky, Drumary, Drumarraght, Drumataffan, Drumaveel, Drumawill, Drumawillin, Drumbad, Drumbad Beg, Drumbadmeen, Drumbad More, Drumbadreevagh, Drumbaghlin, Drumbane, Drumbaran, Drumbargy, Drumbarna, Drumbarry, Drumbealimy, Drumbeggan, Drumbegger, Drumberny, Drumbinnis, Drumbinnisk, Drumbo, Drumboarty, Drumbockany, Drumboghanagh Glebe, Drumbominy, Drumboory, Drumboy, Drumbrick, Drumbristan, Drumbrughas, Drumbrughas East, Drumbrughas North, Drumbrughas South, Drumbrughas West, Drumbulcan, Drumbullog, Drumcahy, Drumcanon, Drumcard, Drumcaw, Drumchorick, Drumcin, Drumclay, Drumcloona, Drumclounish, Drumcolgny, Drumcon, Drumconlan East, Drumconlan West, Drumconnis, Drumconor, Drumcoo, Drumcoo or Belview, Drumcor, Drumcorban, Drumcose, Drumcramph, Drumcreen, Drumcrin, Drumcroohen, Drumcrooil, Drumcrow, Drumcrow East, Drumcrow West, Drumcru, Drumcullion, Drumcully, Drumcunny, Drumcurren, Drumderg, Drumdoney, Drumdran, Drumduff, Drumee, Drumeeshil, Drumelly, Drumerheeve, Drumerwinter, Drumettagh, Drumgague, Drumgallan, Drumgamph, Drumgarrow, Drumgay, Drumgivery, Drumgoast, Drumgoland, Drumgole, Drumgoon, Drumgormley, Drumgormly, Drumgorran, Drumgowna, Drumgowna East, Drumgowna West, Drumgramph, Drumgrenaghan, Drumguiff, Drumguillagh, Drumhack, Drumharriff, Drumhaw, Drumhervin, Drumhirk, Drumhirk Lower, Drumhirk Upper, Drumhoney, Drumhose, Drumhoy, Drumierna, Druminiskill, Druminshin Beg, Druminshinardagh, Druminillar, Drumkeen, Drumkeenagh, Drumkeenragh, Drumkeeran, Drumkillen, Drumlaghy, Drumleagues Big, Drumleagues Little, Drumliff, Drumlisaleen, Drumlish, Drumlone, Drumlongfield, Drumlught, Drummacabranagher, Drummacahan, Drummack, Drummackan, Drummackilowney, Drummacalara, Drummacoorin, Drummal, Drumman, Drummannagapple, Drummans Glebe, Drummaw, Drummee, Drummeer, Drummenagh Beg, Drummoan or Newtate, Drummoghan, Drummonaghan, Drummoney, Drummoyagh, Drummuck, Drummully, Drummurl Glebe, Drummurry, Drummusky, Drumnacross, Drumnagalliagh, Drumnagreshial, Drumnamalragh, Drumnameel, Drumnanane, Drumnarullagh, Drumnasreane, Drumnavahan, Drumoghill, Drumoris, Drumpeen, Drumquilla, Drumrainbane, Drumrainduff, Drumrainy, Drumralla, Drumreane, Drumrearty, Drumreask, Drumroo, Drumroosk, Drumrush, Drumsara, Drumsastry, Drumsawna Beg, Drumscollop, Drumshancorick, Drumshane, Drumshimuck, Drumsillagh, Drumskea, Drumskew, Drumskimly, Drumskinny, Drumskool, Drumsloe, Drumsluice, Drumsna, Drumsroohil, Drumsoo, Drumsroohil, Drumswords, Drumwhinny, Drumyarkin, Duck Island, Dulrush, Dungoghy, Duross

== E ==
Eagle Island, Edenaclogh, Edenagee, Edenagilhorn, Edenamohill Black, Edenaveagh, Edenbane, Edenclaw Great, Edenclaw Little, Edenmore, Edenticromman, Ederdacurragh, Ederdaglass or Hollybank, Edergole, Edergole Island, Ederny, Ely Island, Enaghan, Erdinagh, Errasallagh, Erveny, Ervey, Eshacorran, Eshanummer, Eshbane, Eshbralley, Eshcarcoge, Eshcleagh and Doon, Eshekerin, Eshmeen, Eshnadarragh, Eshnadeelada, Eshnagorr, Eshnanumera, Eshnascreen, Eshnasillog Beg, Eshnasillog More, Eshthomas, Eshywulligan, Eskeragh, Estea Island

== F ==
Falls, Fardrum, Fargrim, Farm, Farnaconnell, Farnaght, Farnamullan, Farranaconaghy, Farranacurky, Farranasculloge, Farrancassidy, Fartagh, Fassagh, Faughard, Faugher, Faurkagh, Feagh, Feddan, Feddans, Fedian, Ferney, Ferny Island, Feugh, Finlane, Finner, Finner's Islands, Finnis Island North, Fintonagh, Firs, Florence Court Demesne, Fod Island, Foglish, Follum Big, Foremass, Forfey, Formil, Forthill, Foydragh, Frevagh, Friar's Island, Furnish, Fyagh

== G ==
Gadalough, Gad Island, Gaffer Island, Galbally, Gallagh, Gall Island, Galloon, Gardenhill, Gardrum, Gargrim, Garraroosky, Garrifly, Garrison, Garrow or Buck Islands, Garvaghy, Garvary, Garvoghill, Garvros, Geaglum, Geddagh Island, Gillyholme (Ely), Giltagh, Glasdrumman, Glasmullagh, Glen, Glenall, Glenarn, Glencoonra, Glencovet Glebe, Glencunny, Glen East, Glen West, Glengesh, Glenkeel, Glenkeen, Glenlevan, Glennagarran, Glennasheevar, Glenross, Glenvannan, Glenwinny, Goat Island, Gola, Goladoo, Goladuff, Golan, Gole, Gorgesh, Gorminish, Gortacar, Gortacarn, Gortacharn, Gortadrehid, Gortadrehid Big, Gortadrehid Little, Gortahurk, Gortahurk East, Gortahurk West, Gortaloughan, Gortalughany, Gortaree, Gortatole, Gortbrannan, Gortdonaghy, Gorteen, Gortermoan, Gortgall, Gortgarran, Gortgarvan, Gortgeran, Gortgommon, Gortgonnell, Gortgor, Gortgorgan, Gortgranagh, Gortgullenan, Gortindarragh, Gortineddan, Gortinure, Gortleet, Gortmaconnell, Gortmessan, Gortmullan, Gortnacally, Gortnacarrow, Gortnaderg, Gortnagriffin, Gortnagullion, Gortnalee, Gortnaree, Gortoral, Gortraw, Gowny, Graan, Graffy, Granshagh Big, Grattan, Gravelly Island, Gravel Ridge, Gravel Ridge Island, Greagh, Greaghacapple, Greaghacholea, Greaghaphort, Greaghatirrive, Greaghaverrin, Greaghavockan, Greaghawarren, Greaghcashel, Greaghmore, Greaghnafine, Greaghnagleragh, Greaghnagore, Greaghnamoyle, Greaghrawer, Greenan, Greenhill, Greentown or Knocknabrattoge, Greenwoodhill, Greystone, Grogey, Gubb, Gubbacrock, Gubbakip, Gubbaroe, Gubdoo, Gublusk, Gubnaguinie, Gubrusdinna, Gull Rock, Gushedy Beg

== H ==
Hare Island, Hay Island, Henrystughan, Hermitage, Heron Island, Hill's Island, Hollybank or Ederdaglass, Hollybrook, Hollymount, Horse Island

== I ==
Imeroo, Inishcollan, Inishcorkish, Inishcreagh Island, Inishcreenry (Island), Inishcrevan (Island), Inishee Island, Inisherk (Island), Inishfausy, Inishfendra (Island), Inishkeen, Inishkeeragh, Inishleague (Island), Inishlirroo, Inishlught, Inishmacsaint (Island), Inishmakill (Island), Inishmeely, Inishore, Inishroosk, Inishteige, Inishturk, Inisway, Inver, Isle Namanfin

== J ==
Johnstown or Cornaclare, Jubilee Island

== K ==
Keadew, Keady, Keelaghan, Keelagho, Keelaghy, Keelpark Glebe, Keenaghan, Keenaghy, Keeran, Keeran Beg, Keeran More, Kerney Island, Kevenagh, Kilduff, Kilgarrett, Kilgarrow, Kilgarrow Glebe, Kilgortnaleague, Killafinta, Killaghy, Killalahard, Killarbran, Killard, Killartry, Killashanbally, Killaspeenan, Killee, Killernam, Killesher, Killybane, Killy Beg, Killyblane, Killybracken, Killybreagy, Killybreed, Killycappy, Killycarnan, Killycat, Killycloghan, Killycloghy, Killyclowny, Killycramph, Killycreen East, Killycrutteen, Killyculla, Killydrum, Killyfole, Killygarry, Killygorman and Aghadrumsee, Killygowan Island, Killygrania, Killygreagh, Killygullan, Killyhevlin, Killyhommon, Killykeeghan, Killykeeran, Killylacky, Killylea, Killylifferbane Glebe, Killylifferdoo, Killyliss, Killymackan, Killymittan, Killynacran, Killynamph, Killynick, Killynoogan, Killynubber, Killynure, Killypaddy, Killyphort, Killyraw, Killyreagh, Killyroo, Killyrover, Killytaggart, Killyvannan, Killyveagh Glebe, Killyvilly, Killywillin, Kilmacbrack, Kilmacormick, Kilmalanophy, Kilmore, Kilmore North, Kilmore South, Kilnabrack, Kilnacran, Kilnakelly, Kilnakirk, Kilnamadoo, Kilnamaddy, Kilnambrahar, Kilnaloo, Kilnameel, Kilnarainy, Kilready, Kilridd, Kilronan, Kilrooskagh, Kilroosky, Kilroot, Kilsallagh, Kilsmullan, Kilteen Glebe, Kiltenamullagh, Kiltierney, Kiltober, Kilturk North, Kilturk South, Kilturk West, Kiltycrose, Kiltyfelan, Kimran, Kinarla, Kinawley, Kingarrow North, Kingarrow South, Kinglass, Kingstown, Kinmeen North, Kinmeen South, Kinmore, Kinnausy Island, Kinoughtragh, Kinrush, Kippeen Island, Knappagh, Knockadoois, Knockageehan, Knockalough, Knockarevan, Knockateggal, Knockavea, Knockawaddy, Knock Beg, Knockbodarra, Knockboy, Knockennis, Knock Island, Knockmacaroony Glebe, Knockmackegan, Knockmacmanus, Knockmaddaroe, Knockmanoul, Knock More, Knocknabrass, Knocknabrattoge or Greentown, Knocknahunshin, Knocknalear, Knocknalosset, Knocknashangan, Knocknastackan, Knockninny, Knockroe, Knockroe Archdall, Knockroe Irvine, Knocks

== L ==
Lack, Lackaghboy, Lacky, Lamb Island, Lammy, Lanaghran, Landbrock, Lankill, Lanmore, Lannaght, Laragh, Largalinny, Larganacarran, Largandoy, Largy, Larkhill, Larmore, Lattonagh, Lattone, Laughill, Lavaran, Lea, Leaghan, Leam, Leam Beg, Leambreslen, Leamnamoyle, Lebally, Leeffa, Legacurry, Legaduff, Legatillida, Legg, Leggs, Leginn, Legland, Leglehid, Legmacaffry, Legnabrocky, Legnagay Beg, Legnagay More, Legnahorna, Legnavea, Lehill, Lehinch, Leighan, Leitrim, Lenaghan, Leraw, Lergan, Lesky, Lettan, Letter, Letterbailey, Letterboy, Letterbreen, Lettergreen, Letterkeen, Lettermoney, Levaghy, Levally Lower, Lignameeltoge, Lisadearny, Lisblake, Lisbofin, Lisboy, Liscosker, Liscreevin, Lisdead, Lisderry, Lisdivrick, Lisdoodan, Lisdrum, Lisduff, Lisgally, Lisgoole, Lisingle, Liskilly, Lislarris, Lislea, Lismacsheela, Lismalore, Lismonaghan, Lismoonly, Lisnabane, Lisnadurk Glebe South, Lisnagole, Lisnaknock, Lisnamallard, Lisnashillida, Lisnavoe, Lisnawesnagh, Lisolvan, Lisoneill, Lisrace, Lisreagh, Lisroddy, Lisroon, Lissagorry Glebe, Lissan, Littlehill, Littlemount, Lockard Big, Loftus Island, Lonesome Island, Longfield, Long Island, Longrob, Long Rock, Loughachork, Loughgare, Lough Hill, Loughkillygreen, Lowery, Lowerybane, Lugmore, Lurgan, Lurganbane, Lurganboy, Lurganclabby, Lurgandarragh Big, Lurgandarragh Little, Lurganboy, Lusty Beg, Lusty Beg Island, Lusty More, Lusty More Island

== M ==
Macart Island, Mackan Glebe, Macknagh, Magheracross, Magheradunbar, Magheragannon, Magherahar, Magheramenagh, Magheramore, Magheranageeragh, Magherareagh, Magho, Magonragh, Magurk's Island, Mallybreen, Manger, Manoo, Manor Water House, Mantlin, Marlbank, Meenacloyabane, Meenagleragh, Meenarainy, Meenatully, Meenmore, Meentullyclogh, Meenawargy, Middletown, Midhill, Milligans, Milltate, Milltown, Milltown Blaney, Millwood, Minran, Mockbeggar, Modeenagh, Moher, Moheranea, Moleena, Molly, Monaghan, Monalla, Monanacloy, Monavreece, Monawilkin, Monea, Moneen, Moneenbane, Moneendogue, Moneykee, Moneymakinn, Moneyneddy, Moneynoe Glebe or Chanterhill, Moneyouragan, Mongibbaghan, Monmurry, Montiaghroe, Moorlough, Mossfield or Urbal, Moughley, Mount Darby, Mountdrum, Mountjoy Island, Mount Prospect or Tullyoran, Movarran, Moybane, Moybrone, Moyglass, Moykeel, Moylehid, Moynaghan North, Moynaghan South, Moysnaght, Muckenagh, Muckinish or White Island, Muckros, Muggalnagrow, Mullaghbane, Mullaghblaney, Mullaghboy, Mullaghbrady, Mullaghbreedin, Mullaghcapple, Mullaghconnelly, Mullaghdun, Mullaghfad, Mullaghfarne, Mullaghgare, Mullaghgarrow, Mullaghglass, Mullaghinshogagh, Mullaghkeel or Ballymackilroy, Mullaghkippin, Mullaghlehan, Mullaghlevin, Mullaghmaddy, Mullaghmakervy, Mullaghmeen, Mullaghmore, Mullaghree, Mullaghsillogagh, Mullaghy, Mullan, Mullan or Bumper Lodge, Mullanacaw, Mullanahinch, Mullanasaggart, Mullanaskea, Mullanavehy, Mullanawinna, Mullanmeen Under, Mullanrody, Mullans, Mullanshellistragh, Mullanvaum, Mullavea Glebe, Mullies, Mullyard, Mullyardlougher, Mullybrack, Mullybreslen, Mullybritt, Mullycavan, Mullycovet, Mullydinnity, Mullyduff, Mullygarry, Mullykivet, Mullyknock or Topped Mountain, Mullylogan, Mullylun, Mullylusty, Mullymesker, Mullynaburtlan, Mullynacoagh, Mullynagowan, Mullynaherb, Mullynahunshin, Mullynalughoge, Mullynascarty, Mullynaskeagh, Mullynaval, Mullynavale, Mullynavannoge, Mullynavarnoge, Mullyned, Mullyneeny, Mulnadoran, Mulnahorn, Mulrod, Munville, Mweelbane

== N ==
Naan Island South, Ned, Nedsherry, Ned's Island, Newpark, Newtate or Drummoan, Newtown, Nutfield

== O ==
Oakfield, Oghill, Oghillicartan, Old Barr, Ora More or Tullybrack, Oughterdrum, Owenbreedin, Owenskerry, Owl Island

== P ==
Paris Island Big, Parkhill, Parson's Green Glebe, Physicberry Island, Pipers Hill, Point, Pollaginnive, Pollkathleen, Portbeg, Portinode, Portmush, Portnablahy, Portnacloyaduff, Portnasnow Glebe, Portreagh, Ports, Pottiagh, Procklis, Pubble, Purgatory Island, Pushen Island

== R ==
Rabbit Island, Rabron, Rafintan, Rahall, Rahallan, Rahalton, Rakeelan Glebe, Ramaley, Ramoan or Barr, Ramult, Randalshough, Rateen, Rathfure, Rathkeelan, Rathkeevan, Rathmoran, Rathmore, Ratoal, Ratona, Ratoran, Raw, Reilly, Relagh, Rellan, Renogher Glebe, Reyfad, Rigg, Ring, Ringvilla, Rockfield, Rocky Island, Rooskagh North, Rooskagh South, Roosky, Ross, Rossaa, Rossachrin, Rossahilly, Rossavally, Rosscah, Rosscor, Rosscor Island, Rossdanean, Rossgole, Ross Inner, Ross Outer, Rossbeg, Rossbrick Glebe, Rosscarn, Rossclare, Rosscolban, Rosscolton, Rosscorkey Island, Rosscrennagh, Rossdagamph or St Catherines, Rossdoney, Rossfad, Rossgad, Rossgweer, Rossharbour, Rossharbour Old, Rossigh, Rossinnan, Rossinure Beg, Rossinure More, Rosskit Island, Rosslea, Rossmacaffry, Rossmacall, Rossmacawinny, Rossmacole, Rossmore, Rossnafarsan, Rossole, Rossorry, Rosspoint or Cosbystown East, Rossyvullan, Rotten Mountain, Rough Island, Round Island, Rushin, Rushinbane, Rush Island

== S ==
Sallaghy, Salloon, Sallow Island, Sally Island, Sally Islands, Sallysgrove, Salry, Sam's Island, Samsonagh, Sandhill, Sandholes, Scaffog, Scandally, Scardans Lower, Scattered Rocks, Screegan Island, Screevagh, Scribbagh, Scribby, Sessiagh East, Sessiaghs, Sessiagh West, Shallany, Shanaghy, Shanco, Shankill, Shanmullagh, Shannock, Shanraa, Shanvally, Shave Island, Shean, Sheebeg, Sheehinny, Sheemuldoon, Sheeny, Sheepwalk, Sheetrim, Sheridan, Shillanmore, Sidaire, Silverhill, Skea, Skeagh, Skeoge, Skreen, Skrinny, Slapragh, Slattinagh, Slawin, Slee, Slievebane, Slisgarrow, Slush Hill, Smith's Rock, Snowhill, Spring Grove, Springtown, Sraharory, Srahenny, Srameen Island, Sraniff, Sruhanure, Staff Island, Starraghan, St Catherine's or Rossdagamph, Stonefort, Stonepark, Stony Islands, Stragolan, Stragole, Stallion Cowes Island, Stragowna, Stralahan, Stralustrin, Stramatt, Stranacally, Stranadarriff, Stranafeley, Stranahone, Strananerriagh, Stratonagher, Stratore, Stripe, Strongbow Island, Stumpys Hill, Summerhill

== T ==
Tabagh, Tamlaght, Tantybulk, Tatnamallaght, Tatteevagh, Tattenabuddagh, Tattenaheglish, Tattenalee, Tattenamona, Tattinderry, Tattendillur, Tattinbarr, Tattinfree, Tattintonegan, Tattinweer, Tattycam, Tattygare, Tattygare Glebe, Tattygormican, Tattykeel Lower, Tattykeel Upper, Tattykeeran, Tattymacall, Tattymore, Tattymorris, Tattynacunnian, Tattynageeragh, Tattynagolan, Tattynuckle, Tattyreagh, Tawnaghgorm, Tawnawanny, Tawnydorragh, Tawnynoran, Tawnyreagh, Tedd, Teebane, Teemore, Teer, Teesnaghtan, Teige's Rock, Templenaffrin, Tents, Thomastown, Thornhill Glebe, Tibberedoge Glebe, Tievaveeny, Tievealough, Tievebunnan, Tievegarrow, Tievenavarnog, Tiraffy, Tiraltan, Tiranagher Beg, Tiraroe, Tiravally Glebe, Tiravree Glebe, Tirconnell, Tireeghan, Tireevil, Tirenny, Tirigannon, Tirmacspird, Tirmonen, Tiroogan, Tirwinny, Tober, Tobradan, Tom's Island or Inishbeg, Tonagh Glebe, Tonanoran, Tonardrum, Tonavally, Toneel North, Toneel South, Toney, Tonity Bog, Tonitygorman, Tonlisderritt, Tonnaboy, Tonnacroob, Tonnagh, Tonnaghboy, Tonregee Island, Tonwore, Tonydrummallard, Tonyglaskan, Tonyloman, Tonymalloe, Tonymelt, Tonymore, Tonystick, Tonyteige, Tonyvarnog, Tonywall, Toolinn, Toppan, Toppan Island, Topped Mountain or Mullyknock, Toralt, Tower Beg, Townhill, Trahanacarrick Island, Trannish (Island), Trasna, Trasna Island, Treel, Trien, Trillick, Tromogagh, Trory, Trustan, Trustan Glebe, Tubbrid, Tullanaginn, Tullanaglare, Tullanaglug, Tullanaguiggy, Tullinteskin, Tullinwonny, Tully, Tully North, Tully South, Tullyavy, Tullybellina, Tullybrack or Ora More, Tullycarbry, Tullychurry, Tullyclea, Tullycreevy, Tullydevenish, Tullyfad, Tullygerravra, Tullyharney, Tullyholvin Lower, Tullykelter, Tullykenneye, Tullylammy, Tullylone, Tullylough, Tullymargy, Tullynabohoge, Tullynacor, Tullynagarn, Tullynagowan, Tullynasrahan, Tullyneevin, Tullyreagh, Tullyrossmearan, Tullysranadeega, Tullyvogy

== U ==
Ummera, Uttony

== W ==
Whilliter, Whinnigan Glebe, Whitehill, Whitehill North, Whitehill South, Windmill Hill, Woody Mullaghree or Ashwoods

== See also ==
- List of civil parishes of County Fermanagh
