= Derrynacrannog Glebe =

Derrynacrannog Glebe: Irish: Doire na Crannóg
- District: Fermanagh and Omagh
- County: County Fermanagh
- Country: Northern Ireland
- Sovereign state: United Kingdom
- Postcode district: BT93
- Dialling code: 028
- UK Parliament: Fermanagh and South Tyrone
- NI Assembly: Fermanagh and South Tyrone

Derrynacrannog Glebe (from Irish Doire na Crannóg, meaning 'oak wood of the lake dwelling') is a townland of 1,051 acres in County Fermanagh, Northern Ireland. It is situated in the civil parish of Belleek and the historic barony of Lurg.

== See also ==
- List of townlands in County Fermanagh
