= The Round O =

The Round O Jetty is located in Brooke Park in Enniskillen and on the River Erne which is part of the Lough Erne waterway system. Boats can moor alongside the jetty and a boat for tourists runs to Devenish Island in the summer months. Normally the MV Kestrel runs to Devenish Island.

Facilities in Brooke Park include a cafe and toilets.

== Location ==
The Round O is in Enniskillen within walking distance of the town centre, including the Ulsterbus station. Enniskillen is located in County Fermanagh, in the west of Northern Ireland.

== See also ==
- Waterways Ireland
