= Lustymore Island =

Island in County Fermanagh, Northern Ireland

Coordinates: 54.50225°N 7.84295°W

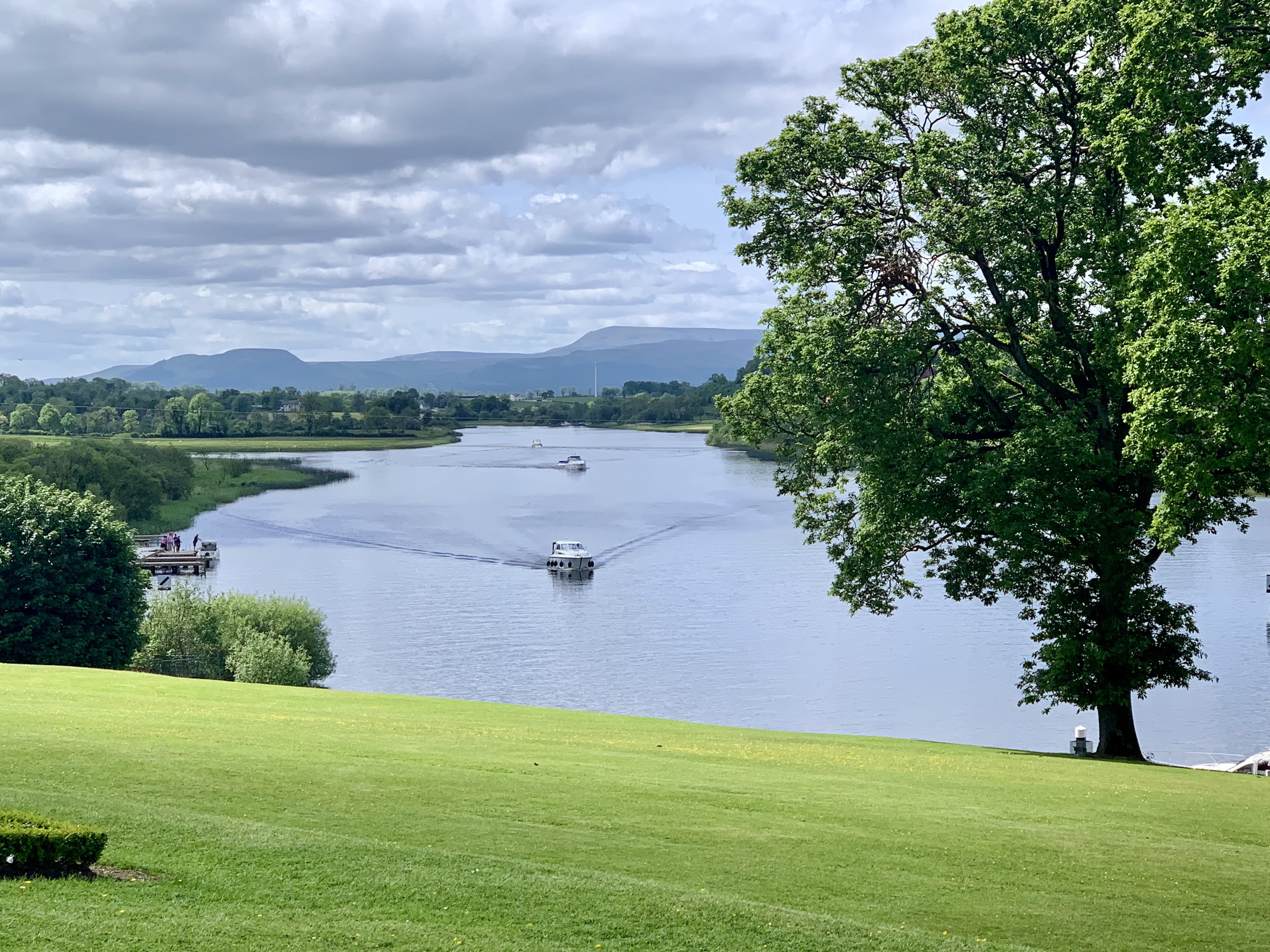
Boats traveling through Lough Erne, c. 2021

Lustymore Island (from Irish Loiste Mór 'big lodge') is an island located in Lower Lough Erne, County Fermanagh, Northern Ireland.

Nearby is Boa Island whose Caldragh cemetery has a carved Janus-type figure. A second figure was brought to Caldragh in 1939 from Lustymore Island.

In the early 20th century, Lady Hunt from Alberta, Canada, owned both Lustymore and Lustybeg islands. When her residence, Glenvar House, accidentally burned down, she moved to Germany.

== Sources ==
- Lowry-Corry, Dorothy. "The Stones Carved with Human Effigies on Boa Island and on Lustymore Island, in Lower Lough Erne". Proceedings of the Royal Irish Academy: Archaeology, Culture, History, Literature, volume 41, 1932. JSTOR 25515968
