= Humphrey Galbraith =

Humphrey Galbraith was an Anglican archdeacon in Ireland in the 17th century.

A Scot, he held livings at Derrybrusk, Tedavnet and Muckno. He was Archdeacon of Clogher from 1640 to 1661.
