= Joseph Calwell =

Irish Anglican priest

Joseph Calwell (18 October 1808- 11 February 1882) was a nineteenth century Irish Anglican priest.

Callwell was born in Dublin and educated at Trinity College, Dublin. After a curacy in Newcastle, County Dublin he held livings at Newtownmountkennedy, Drummully, Aghavea and Kilskeery. He was Archdeacon of Clogher from 1871 to 1873.
