= Oughterdrum =

Townland (administrative division) in Northern Ireland

Oughterdrum: Irish: Uachtar-druim
- District: Fermanagh and Omagh
- County: County Fermanagh
- Country: Northern Ireland
- Sovereign state: United Kingdom
- Postcode district: BT
- Dialling code: 028
- UK Parliament: Fermanagh and South Tyrone
- NI Assembly: Fermanagh and South Tyrone

Oughterdrum (from Irish Uachtar-druim, meaning 'upper ridge') is a townland of 125 acres in County Fermanagh, Northern Ireland. It is situated in the civil parish of Belleek and the historic barony of Lurg.

== See also ==
- List of townlands in County Fermanagh
