= Mallybreen =

Mallybreen: Irish: Malaidhe Bhraoin
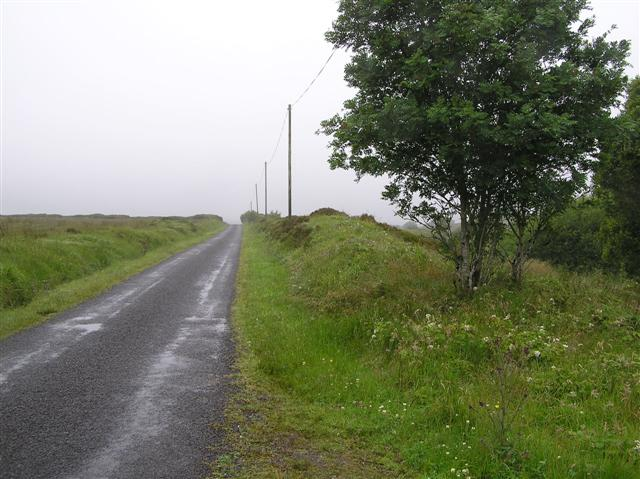
- Road at Mallybreen in 2008
- District: Fermanagh and Omagh
- County: County Fermanagh
- Country: Northern Ireland
- Sovereign state: United Kingdom
- Postcode district: BT93
- Dialling code: 028
- UK Parliament: Fermanagh and South Tyrone
- NI Assembly: Fermanagh and South Tyrone

Mallybreen (from Irish Malaidhe Bhraoin, meaning 'Breen's hill brows') is a townland of 688 acres in County Fermanagh, Northern Ireland. It is situated in the civil parish of Belleek and the historic barony of Lurg.

== See also ==
- List of townlands in County Fermanagh
