= Carrybridge =

Hamlet in County Fermanagh, Northern Ireland

Coordinates: 54.284°N 7.548°W

Carrybridge: Carry
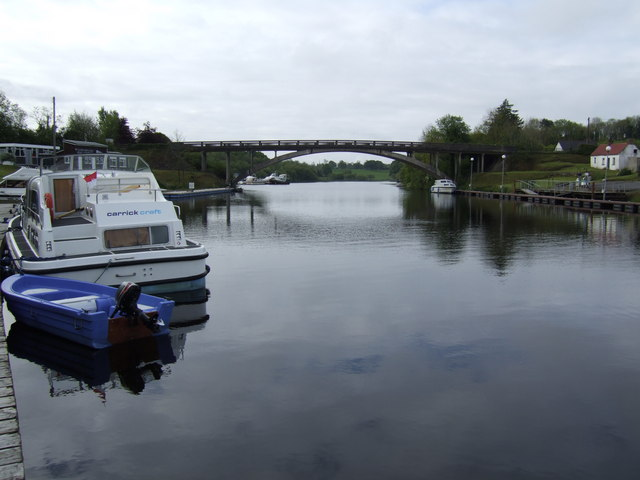
- Carrybridge with its bridge to Inishmore

- Location within Northern Ireland
- Population: < 400 (2001)
- Irish grid reference: H294373
  - Belfast: 79 mi (127 km)
- District: Fermanagh and Omagh
- County: County Fermanagh
- Country: Northern Ireland
- Sovereign state: United Kingdom
- Post town: ENNISKILLEN
- Postcode district: BT94
- Dialling code: 028, +44 28
- UK Parliament: Fermanagh & South Tyrone

Carrybridge, also Carry Bridge, is a hamlet in County Fermanagh, Northern Ireland. It is 8 km (5 mi) north-west of Lisnaskea and 11 km (7 mi) south-east of Enniskillen. It is situated in the townland of Aghnacarra in the civil parish of Derrybrusk and the historic barony of Magherastephana.

The hamlet is named from a bridge connecting the island of Inishmore in Upper Lough Erne with the mainland. The bridge is named from the townland of Carry on the island, which name translates as 'causeway' or 'rocky ford', perhaps referring to a feature replaced by the bridge.

It serves as a marina and boat hire centre. The area contains Derryharney Church of Ireland and the Carrybridge Hotel, as well as the bridge over the narrows at the outflow from Upper Lough Erne.

== History ==
On 11/12 December 1956, the bridge was damaged by a thirty-five pound mine which had been planted there by the Irish Republican Army during their 1956 campaign. Two unarmed civilians Eddie McGoldrick and Terrence Baxter died here in 1974.

== RNLI ==
In 2002 the Royal National Lifeboat Institution (RNLI) based a lifeboat on Upper Lough Erne at Carrybridge, to work in conjunction with the original lifeboat station on Lower Lough Erne at Killadeas. It was in temporary accommodation, but in March 2015 RNLI opened their first permanent inland lifeboat station at Carrybridge. The local community helped the charity raise £60,000 towards the cost.
