= Lack, County Fermanagh =

Village in County Fermanagh, Northern Ireland

Coordinates: 54.546°N 7.577°W

Lack: Irish: An Leac
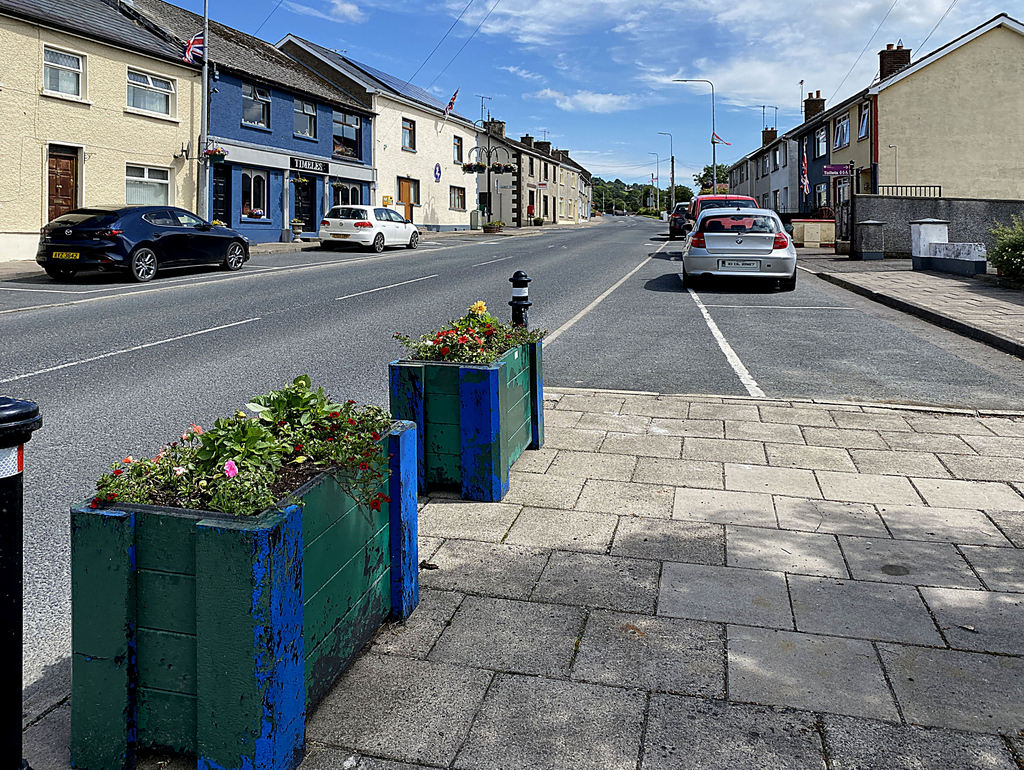
- Main Street

- Location within Northern Ireland
- Population: 111 (2021 Census)
- Irish grid reference: H271665
- District: Fermanagh and Omagh
- County: County Fermanagh
- Country: Northern Ireland
- Sovereign state: United Kingdom
- Post town: ENNISKILLEN
- Postcode district: BT94
- Dialling code: 028, +44 28
- UK Parliament: Fermanagh and South Tyrone
- NI Assembly: Fermanagh and South Tyrone

Lack (from Irish An Leac, meaning 'the flagstone') is a small village and townland (of 224 acres) in County Fermanagh, Northern Ireland.

It lies 5.5 km east-north-east of Ederny and is situated in the civil parish of Magheraculmoney and the historic barony of Lurg.

== History ==
Lack likely emerged as a small market for people in the surrounding hilly area. With its remote location and without any natural resources, it was 'never destined to flourish' and has historically been the smallest and poorest of the villages in the Glendarragh Valley.

In 2005, Airtricity completed the construction of a wind farm on Tappaghan Hill in the townland of Glenarn, near Lack.

== Education ==
Lack Primary School, the local controlled primary school, was officially closed on 31 August 2025.

== Demography ==
The village recorded a population of 111 people across 55 households in the 2021 Census.

== See also ==
- List of towns and villages in Northern Ireland
- List of townlands in County Fermanagh
