= Cashelnadrea =

Townland in County Fermanagh, Ireland

Coordinates: 54.381°N 8.043°W

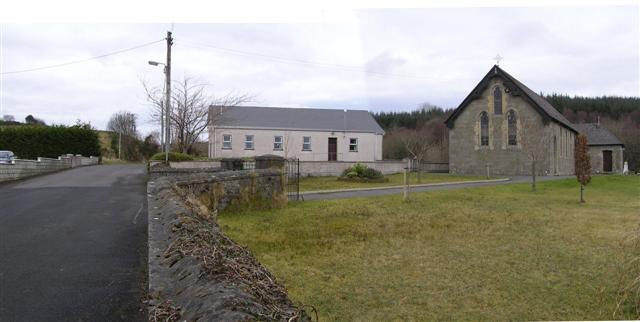
Catholic church and community hall in Cashelnadrea, near Cashel crossroads

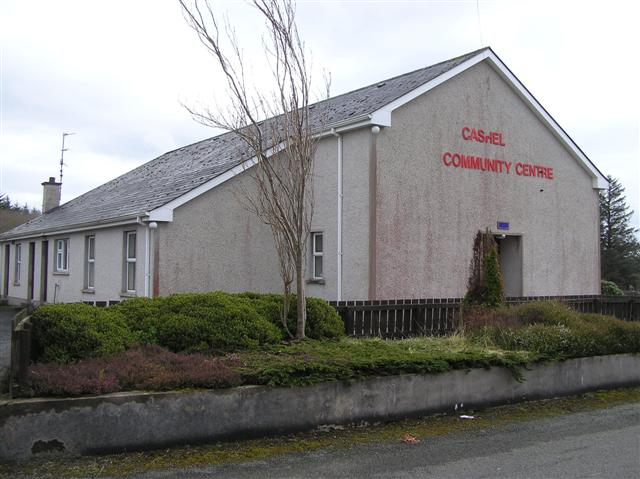
Cashel community hall

Cashelnadrea (from Irish caiseal na dreice 'stone fort of the rough pasture'), known locally as Cashel, is a townland near Garrison, County Fermanagh in Northern Ireland, United Kingdom. Cashelnadrea lies within the civil parish of Devenish, as does the neighbouring townland of Scribbagh. Cashelnadrea is a rural townland that is approximately four miles from the village of Garrison and nine miles from Belleek, County Fermanagh. It is close to the border with County Leitrim and the village of Kiltyclogher.

The Catholic church at Cashelnadrea, St Joseph's Church, was built in 1873.

The nearby Scribbagh ASSI (Area of Special Scientific Interest) is a small conservation area that was protected by the Northern Ireland Executive due to the abundance of rare fossils discovered in a disused quarry. The local area has also been found to contain high levels of shale gas reserves, and has been listed as a probable fracking site by the Tamboran company, a move which has been condemned by most locals.
