= Tullychurry =

Townland (land unit) in Northern Ireland

Coordinates: 54.3130°N 7.5622°W

Tullychurry: Irish: Tulaigh Churraigh
- Location within Northern Ireland
- District: Fermanagh and Omagh
- County: County Fermanagh
- Country: Northern Ireland
- Sovereign state: United Kingdom
- Postcode district: BT93
- Dialling code: 028
- UK Parliament: Fermanagh and South Tyrone
- NI Assembly: Fermanagh and South Tyrone

Tullychurry (from Irish Tulaigh Churraigh, meaning 'hill of the marsh or moor', IPA:[ˈt̪ˠʊliːˈxʊɾˠɾˠiː]) is a townland of 521 acres in County Fermanagh, Northern Ireland. It is situated in the civil parish of Belleek and the historic barony of Lurg.

== Places of interest ==
Tullychurry Forest is open to the public and covers 830 hectares of coniferous woodland with large areas unplanted for conservation purposes. It is also a designated forest for horse riding.

== See also ==
- List of townlands in County Fermanagh
