= Samuel Horne =

Samuel Horne may refer to:

- Samuel B. Horne (1843–1928), American soldier who fought in the American Civil War
- Samuel E. Horne Jr. (1924–2006), research scientist at B. F. Goodrich
