= Ballaghgee Glebe =

Coordinates: 54°29′54.1″N 8°1′41.0″W

Ballaghgee Glebe: Irish: Bealach Gaoíthe
- District: Fermanagh and Omagh
- County: County Fermanagh
- Country: Northern Ireland
- Sovereign state: United Kingdom
- Postcode district: BT93
- Dialling code: 028
- UK Parliament: Fermanagh and South Tyrone
- NI Assembly: Fermanagh and South Tyrone

Ballaghgee Glebe or Ballaghgee (from Irish Bealach Gaoíthe, meaning 'windy pass') is a townland of 334 acres in County Fermanagh, Northern Ireland. It is situated in the civil parish of Belleek and the historic barony of Lurg.

== See also ==
- List of townlands in County Fermanagh
