= Monawilkin =

Coordinates: 54°25′45″N 07°51′40″W

- Location within Northern Ireland
- District: Fermanagh and Omagh
- Country: Northern Ireland
- Sovereign state: United Kingdom
- Post town: ENNISKILLEN
- Dialling code: 028, +44 28
- Police: Northern Ireland
- Fire: Northern Ireland
- Ambulance: Northern Ireland
- NI Assembly: Fermanagh and South Tyrone

Monawilkin is a townland in the West Fermanagh Scarplands in the Civil Parish of Inishmacsaint, Barony of Magheraboy, Northern Ireland. The townland has an area of 85.1947 hectares (210.521 acres) and has previously been referred to as Meenwilkin (1817) and Munadh Wilkin ("Wilkin's bog" 1834). Monawilkin is the best example of unimproved calcareous grassland (blue moor-grass) in Northern Ireland. This differs from other Sesleria-dominated grasslands in the UK in that it also includes species such as Euphrasia salisburgensis (eyebright). Monawilikin is also an important orchid site, contains the best inland site for moths and butterflies (23 species recorded) in Northern Ireland, and is the only Northern Irish site for Cupido minimus, the small blue butterfly. Consequently, this area was designated as a special area of conservation (SAC) and area of special scientific interest (ASSI). The Monawilkin SAC land cover comprises 3% water bodies, 5% bogs, marshes, and fringe water vegetation, 13% heath and scrub, 50% dry grassland, 14% humid grassland, and 15% broad-leaved woodland.

== Flora ==
The diversity of floristic communities of Monawilikin is a product of its limestone and at some points sandstone substrata. Typical plant species recorded in the calcareous grassland are kidney vetch, crested hair-grass, and wild thyme, alongside more locally distributed species such as Irish eyebright and blue moor-grass. Monawilkin has been listed for 24 vascular plants in the register of scarce or rare and extinct vascular plants. The scarce or rare plants are listed with their botanical name, their common name, and then the date they were last recorded: Botrychium lunaria (moonwort, 1985), Juniperus communis, (common juniper, 2012), Saxifraga hypnoides (mossy saxifrage, 2013), Rubus botryeros (raspberry, blackberry family, 1904), Lythrum portula (water-purslane, 1985), Primula veris (cowslip, 1998), Gentianella amarelle (autumn gentian, 2012), Gentianella campestris (field gentian, 2012), Plantago maritima (sea plantain), Euphrasia salisburgensis (Irish eyebright, 1995), Potamogeton praelongus (long-stalked pondweed, 1988), Potamogeton × salicifolius (P. lucens × P. perfoliatus, willow-leaved pondweed), Neottia nidus-avis (bird's-nest orchid, 1986), Platanthera bifolia (lesser butterfly orchid, 2013), Platanthera chlorantha (greater butterfly-orchid, 1985), Pseudorchis albida (small-white orchid, 1998), Coeloglossum viride (frog orchid, 1985), Dactylorhiza incarnata ssp pulchella (early marsh orchid, 2013), Ophrys apifera (bee orchid, 2012), Carex distans (distant sedge, 1987), Agrostis vinealis (brown bent), Bromus racemosus (smooth brome, 2012), Inula helenium (Elecampane, 2012), and Doronicum pardalianches (leopard's-bane, 1996) Vascular species found in Monawilin on the Northern Ireland priority species list include Euphrasia salisburgensis (Irish eyebright) and Juniperus communis (juniper). Those plants mentioned in the Irish Red Data Book include Gentianella campestris (field gentian), Pseudorchis albida (small-white orchid), Neottia nidus-avis (bird's nest orchid), and Ophrys apifera (bee orchid).

The site also contains a patchwork of habitat types such as hazel scrub; oak, birch, and holly woodland; calcareous fen (flushes); and acid grassland heath on sandstone. Consequently, there are many pronounced vegetation transitions from acidic to alkaline and from dry to wet.

== Fauna ==
The townland is also a habitat for Hemaris tityus, the daylight-flying narrow-bordered bee hawk-moth (which looks quite similar to a bumble bee), Trichiura crataegi, the pale eggar moth (only Northern Irish recording), and Eulamprotes unicolorella, the twirling moth.

== See also ==
- List of civil parishes of County Fermanagh
- List of places in County Fermanagh
- List of townlands in County Fermanagh
- List of towns and villages in Northern Ireland
