= Tattykeeran =

Tattykeeran may refer to:

- Tattykeeran, County Fermanagh, a townland in County Fermanagh, Northern Ireland
- Tattykeeran, County Tyrone, a townland in County Tyrone, Northern Ireland
