= Eagle Island, County Fermanagh =

Eagle Island
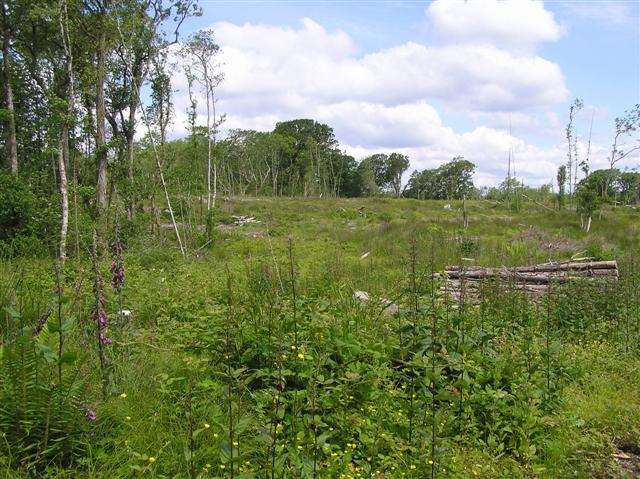
- Eagle Island in 2009
- District: Fermanagh and Omagh
- County: County Fermanagh
- Country: Northern Ireland
- Sovereign state: United Kingdom
- Postcode district: BT
- Dialling code: 028
- UK Parliament: Fermanagh and South Tyrone
- NI Assembly: Fermanagh and South Tyrone

Eagle island is a townland of one acre in County Fermanagh, Northern Ireland. It is situated in the civil parish of Belleek and the historic barony of Lurg.

== See also ==
- List of townlands in County Fermanagh
