= Tawnaghgorm =

Tawnaghgorm may refer to:

- Tawnaghgorm, County Donegal, a townland in County Donegal, Ireland
- Tawnaghgorm, County Fermanagh, a townland in County Fermanagh, Northern Ireland
