= Lowerybane =

Coordinates: 54°28′55″N 8°00′20″W

Lowerybane: Irish: Leamhraidhe
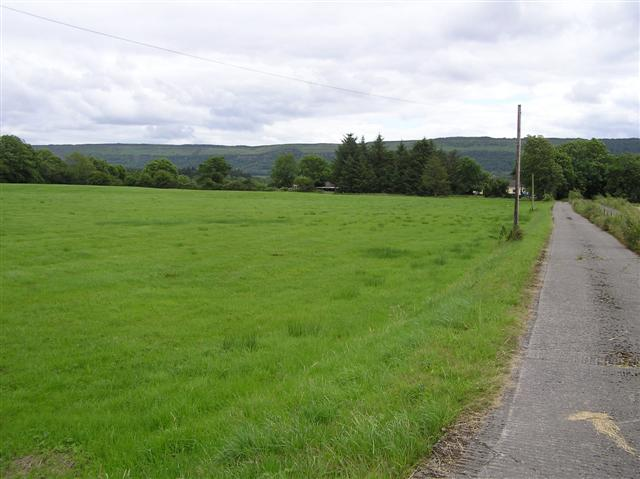
- Lowerybane townland in 2007

- Location within Northern Ireland
- District: Fermanagh and Omagh
- County: County Fermanagh
- Country: Northern Ireland
- Sovereign state: United Kingdom
- Postcode district: BT93
- Dialling code: 028
- UK Parliament: Fermanagh and South Tyrone
- NI Assembly: Fermanagh and South Tyrone

Lowerybane (from Irish Leamhraidhe, meaning 'white elm land') is a townland of 248 acres in County Fermanagh, Northern Ireland. It is situated in the civil parish of Belleek and the historic barony of Lurg.

== See also ==
- List of townlands in County Fermanagh
