= Legland =

Coordinates: 54.38879°N 7.8822141°W

Legland: Irish: Leithghleann
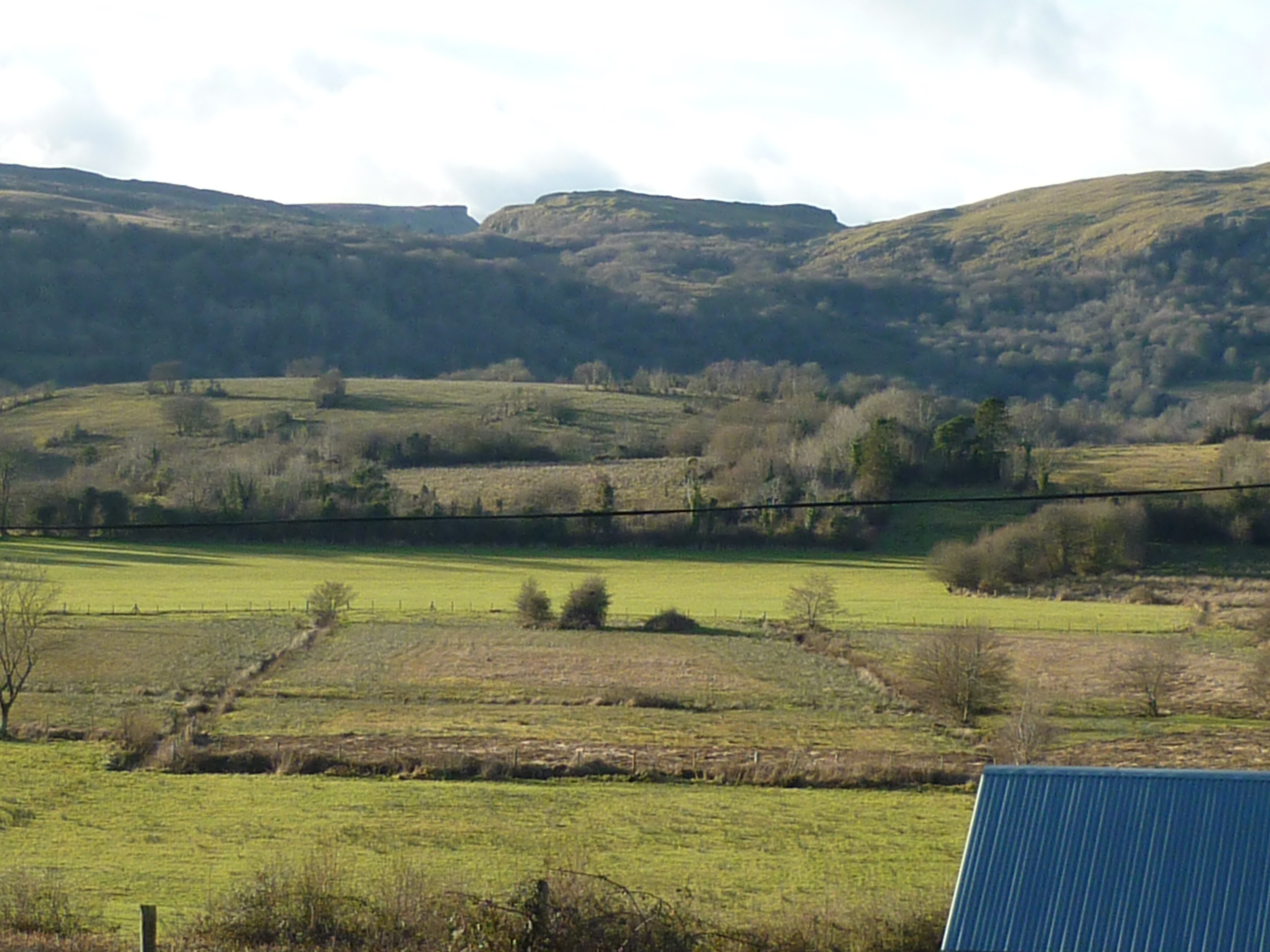
- View of Legland and Knockmore, Boho, County Fermanagh, Northern Ireland

- Location within Northern Ireland
- Irish grid reference: H077489
- District: Fermanagh and Omagh
- County: County Fermanagh
- Country: Northern Ireland
- Sovereign state: United Kingdom
- Postcode district: BT
- Dialling code: 028
- UK Parliament: Fermanagh and South Tyrone
- NI Assembly: Fermanagh and South Tyrone

Legland (from Irish Leith-ghlionn 'half glen') is a townland near Derrygonnelly, in the civil parish of Devenish, religious parish of Botha, barony of Magheraboy, County Fermanagh, Northern Ireland. Legland has an area of 2.965 square kilometres (1.145 sq mi).

== Etymology ==
Legland derives from the Irish Leith-ghleann or Leith-ghlionn, meaning "side of the glen", "half valley" or "half glen". The first record of the townland's name is from the Ordnance Survey map of 1609, where it transcribed as Leglan. Other documented versions of the townlands name are Leglan (1615), Laglan (1630), Leaglan (1630), Leagland (1630), Leglan (1630), Lehglenud (1630), Leth-ghleann (1834), Legland hill (1834) and Leith-ghlionn (1869).

== See also ==
- There are 4 other townlands with the same name in Ireland.
- List of townlands in County Fermanagh
