= Killadeas =

Coordinates: 54.4341°N 7.6826°W

Killadeas: Irish: Cill Chéile Dé
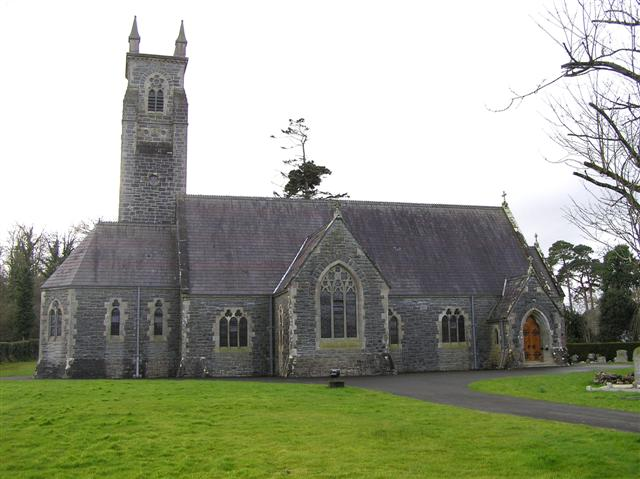
- "The Priory" Church of Ireland

- Location within Northern Ireland
- Population: 82 (2021 census)
- District: Fermanagh and Omagh
- County: County Fermanagh
- Country: Northern Ireland
- Sovereign state: United Kingdom
- Postcode district: BT
- Dialling code: 028
- UK Parliament: Fermanagh and South Tyrone
- NI Assembly: Fermanagh and South Tyrone

Killadeas (from Irish Cill Chéile Dé 'church of the Culdees') is a small village in County Fermanagh, Northern Ireland. It is about 7 miles north of Enniskillen near the shores of Lower Lough Erne, and is within Fermanagh and Omagh district. In the 2021 census it had a population of 82 people.

The Royal National Lifeboat Institution (RNLI) operates a lifeboat station on Lower Lough Erne at Killadeas. It works in conjunction with another lifeboat station on Upper Lough Erne at Carrybridge.

== History ==
In the cemetery of the Church of Ireland Parish "Priory" Church of Killadeas are several stones, the most noted of which is known as the Bishops Stone. The figure carved stone and cross-slab are Scheduled Historic Monuments and are in Rockfield townland at grid ref: H206540. There is a large slab to the west, possibly being some bullaun stones. Near to this is a hole stone and a pillar.

Near Killadeas, on Lower Lough Erne, is Gublusk Bay, a Royal Air Force base for Short Sunderland and PBY Catalina flying boats during World War II. Building at RAF Killadeas started in January 1941 and the first Catalinas arrived two months later. The site is now the home of the Lough Erne Yacht Club.

The Manor House (Hotel), a converted and extended 19th-century country manor, is also in Killadeas. The Killadeas Estate was acquired by Captain J. Irvine in 1660, and the Manor House, formerly known as "Rockfield" (rebuilt 1860) remained part of the Irvine Estate until 1957, when it was purchased for use as a hotel. The Manor House, which has seen many alterations to its design over the centuries, was for a brief period used as an Officer's Mess and Headquarters for the American Forces during World War II.
