= Aghavea =

Aghavea: Irish: Achadh Bheithe
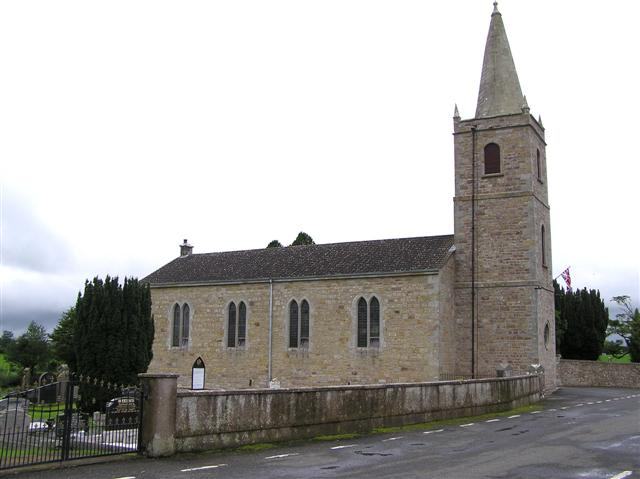
- Aghavea Church of Ireland, in the townland of Aghavea
- Irish grid reference: H3738
- District: Fermanagh and Omagh
- County: County Fermanagh
- Country: Northern Ireland
- Sovereign state: United Kingdom
- Postcode district: BT
- Dialling code: 028
- UK Parliament: Fermanagh and South Tyrone
- NI Assembly: Fermanagh and South Tyrone

Aghavea (from Irish Achadh Bheithe, meaning 'field of the birch tree') is a civil parish and townland (of 131 acres) in County Fermanagh, Northern Ireland. It is situated in the historic barony of Magherastephana.

== Towns and villages ==
The civil parish contains the village of Brookeborough.

== Townlands ==
The civil parish contains the following townlands:

- Aghalun
- Aghavea
- Aghavea Glebe
- Aghnacloy North
- Aghnacloy South
- Aghnagrane
- Ardmoney
- Ardmore
- Ardunshin
- Arlish
- Ballyhill
- Ballyreagh
- Boyhill
- Breandrum
- Broughderg
- Bunlougher
- Bunnisnagapple
- Carntrone
- Carrickyheenan
- Cavanagarvan
- Cavans
- Cleffany
- Coolcoghill
- Coolnagrane
- Coolrakelly
- Cornafannoge
- Cornamucklagh
- Creagh
- Curraghanall
- Currin
- Deer Park
- Derryheely
- Derryvree
- Dressoge
- Drumadagarve
- Drumarraght
- Drumbad
- Drumbrughas
- Drumee
- Drumgorran
- Drumgowna
- Drumhoy
- Drumlone
- Drumoris
- Dungoghy
- Edenagilhorn
- Ervey
- Eshacorran
- Eshnadarragh
- Eshnanumera
- Foydragh
- Giltagh
- Gola
- Gorteen
- Greagh
- Greenhill
- Hollymount
- Killartry
- Killybreagy
- Killycramph
- Killykeeran
- Knockmacmanus
- Largy
- Lisboy
- Liscosker
- Lisdrum
- Lismalore
- Lisnabane
- Lisolvan
- Littlemount
- Lurgan
- Monmurry
- Mulnadoran
- Nutfield
- Owenbreedin
- Rathkeelan
- Skeagh
- Skeoge
- Stranafeley
- Tattenamona
- Tattinbarr
- Tattinfree
- Tattykeeran
- Tonavally
- Toolinn
- Trasna
- Trustan
- Tullynagowan
- Tullyreagh

== See also ==
- List of civil parishes of County Fermanagh
