= Rotten Mountain =

Townland in Fermanagh, Northern Ireland

Rotten Mountain is a townland in the parish of Drumkeeran in County Fermanagh, Northern Ireland.
