= Devenish Island =

Small island of Northern Ireland

Devenish or Devinish Island
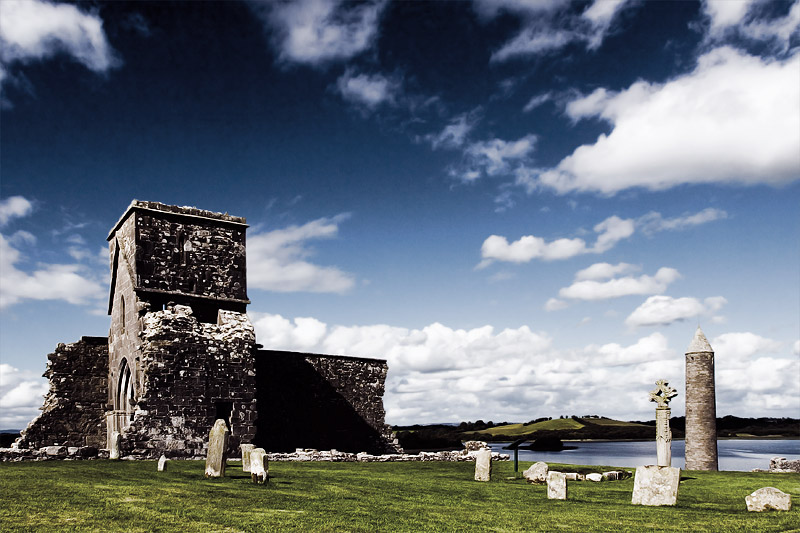
- Monastic site on Devenish Island

- Location within Northern Ireland

Geography
- Location: Lower Lough Erne
- Coordinates: 54°22′20.31″N 7°39′27.51″W
- Area: 0.498 km^{2} (0.192 sq mi)
- Length: 2 km (1.2 mi)
- Width: 1.1 km (0.68 mi)
- Highest elevation: 64.3 m (211 ft)
- Highest point: Sour Hill

Administration
- Northern Ireland (United Kingdom)

Devenish or Devinish (from Irish Daimhinis, meaning 'ox island') is a lake island in Lower Lough Erne, County Fermanagh, Northern Ireland. Aligned roughly north–south, it is about one and a quarter miles (2.0 km) long and two-thirds of a mile (1.1 km) wide.

The island is the site of an early Christian monastery and round tower. It is historically associated with Saint Mo Laisse who is reputed to have founded the monastery in the 6th century. At one point there were up to 1500 religious scholars at Devenish. It possibly belonged to the Culdee order. The settlement, which was raided by Vikings in the 9th century, was burned in 1157. The round tower is 81 feet high with four small windows at the top facing the four cardinal points. Above each window is a finely carved head and a cornice that runs around the top of the tower. There are also examples of 15th century stone crosses on the island.

The island, which is accessible by ferry, is in the civil parish of Devenish. The places to catch a ferry include Trory Point and The Round O, outside Enniskillen. Devenish Island is owned by the Kilravock Christian Trust.

== Area of Special Scientific Interest ==
Devenish Island is designated as an Area of Special Scientific Interest (ASSI) for its grassland, which is noted as a significant breeding site location for wading birds, including Curlew, Snipe, Redshank and Lapwing.

Its drumlin landscape also allows communities of scarce plant types to grow there.

== See also ==
- Cahalan Ó Corcrán
- List of archaeological sites in County Fermanagh
- List of townlands in County Fermanagh
