= Knockarevan =

Townland in County Fermanagh, Northern Ireland

Coordinates: 54°09′N 7°30′W

Knockarevan is a townland in County Fermanagh, Northern Ireland.

The highest temperature in Northern Ireland recorded by the Met Office, 30.8 °C (87.4 °F), was previously at Knockarevan in County Fermanagh on 30 June 1976. It was surpassed by Castlederg when it recorded a temperature of 31.3 °C (88.3 °F) on 21 July 2021.

== See also ==
- List of townlands in County Fermanagh
