= Agharahan =

Townland in County Fermanagh, Northern Ireland

Coordinates: 54.38106°N 7.85411°W

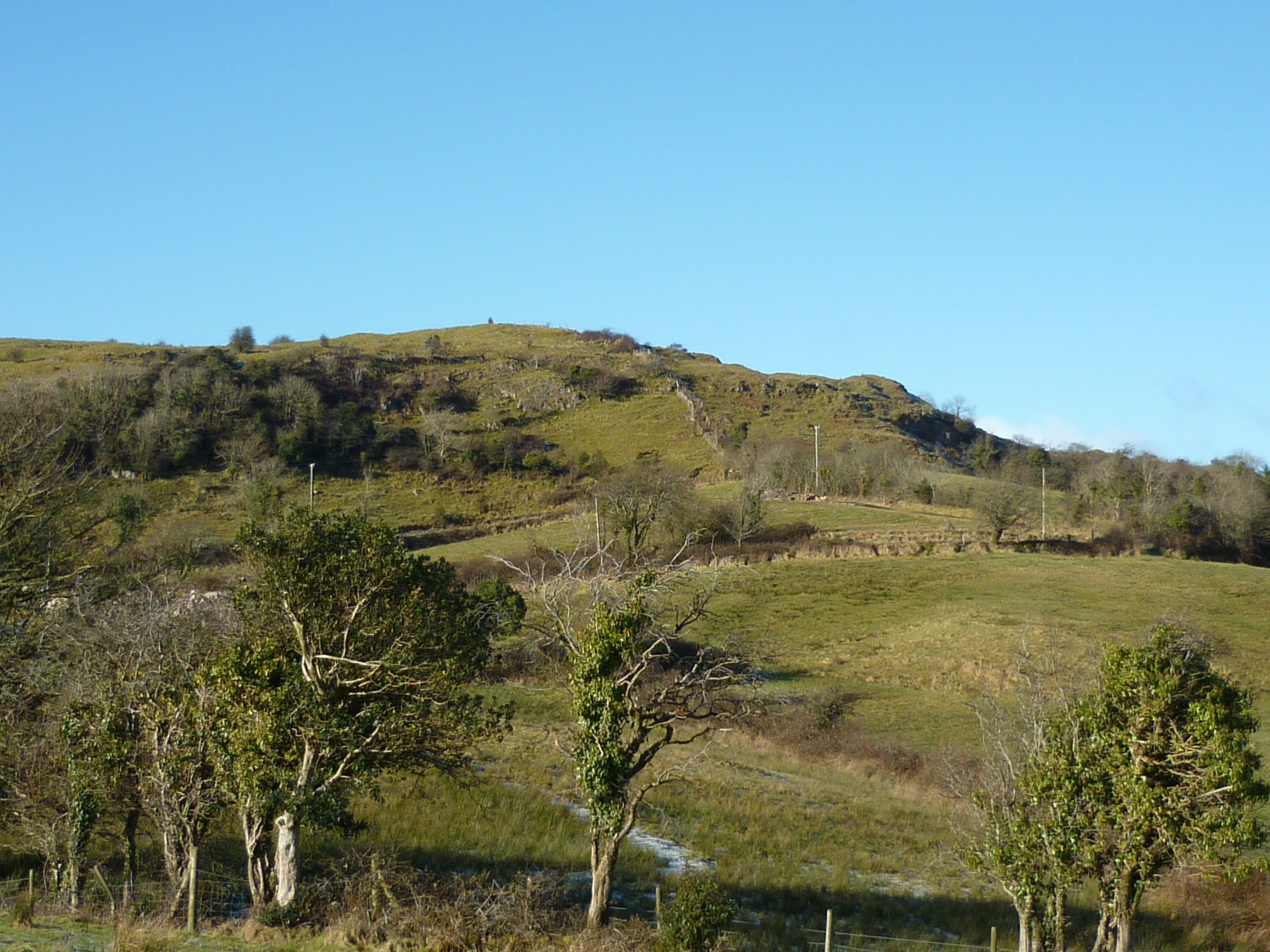
The townland of Agharahan as seen from Oubarraghan

Agharahan (from Irish Achadh Rathain 'field of the ferns') is a townland in the land division of Old Barr in the parish of Devenish in the historical barony of Magheraboy, Northern Ireland. It has an area of 746,831 m² / 74.68 hectares /0.29 square miles/184.55 acres / 184 acres. The townland runs from the high plateau in the Knockmore Scarpland at 766 ft down to the lowlands at 177 ft above sea level and is between the townlands of Old-Barr to the west, Killydrum to the south, Aghakeeran to the north, Drumbegger to the east and Lattonagh to the south. Agharahan is in the civil parish of Devenish but was previously associated with the civil parish of Boho, County Fermanagh.

Agharahan, containing the sub-townland of Pollanaffrin, is notable for Noon's Hole/Arch Cave system and numerous other sink holes (swallow holes). On the same level as Noon's Hole, but further behind the Arch Cave, is another pot hole known as Pollanafrin which is approximately 10 meters deep. This can be seen marked on the map of Griffiths valuation of Ireland 1870.
