= Drumskinny =

Coordinates: 54.584362°N 7.690092°W

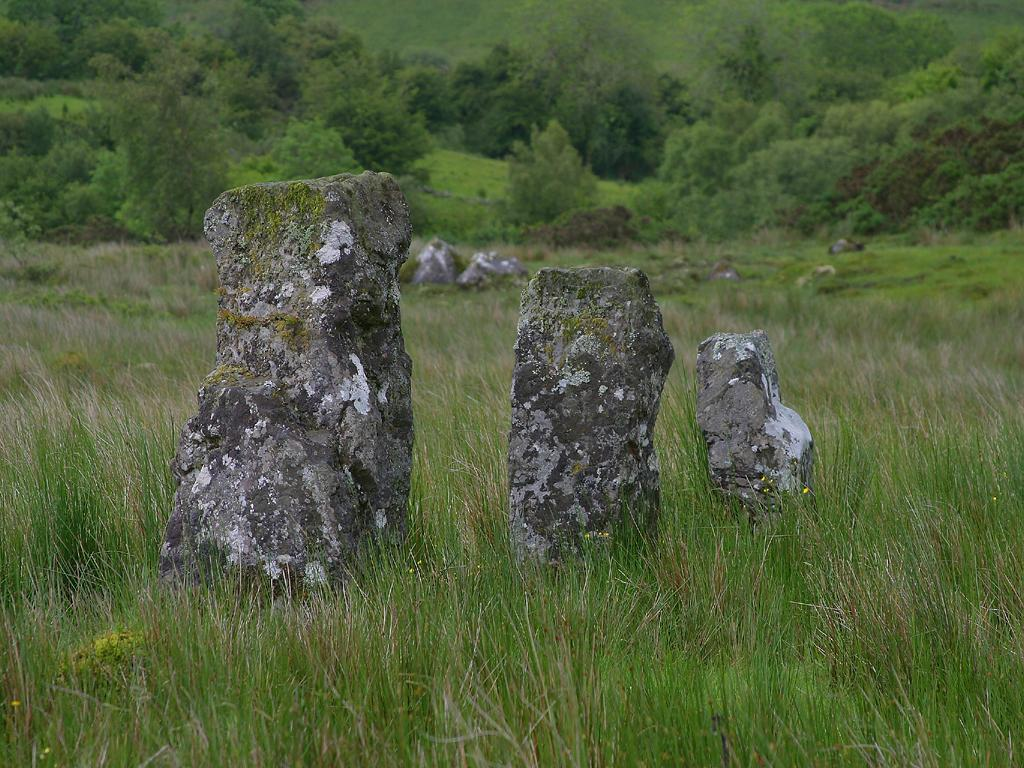
- Some of the standing stones at Drumskinny, County Fermanagh, Northern Ireland

- Location within Northern Ireland
- Irish grid reference: H20097072
- District: Fermanagh and Omagh
- County: County Fermanagh
- Country: Northern Ireland
- Sovereign state: United Kingdom
- Postcode district: BT
- Dialling code: 028, +44 28
- UK Parliament: Fermanagh and South Tyrone
- NI Assembly: Fermanagh and South Tyrone

Drumskinny (from Irish Droim Scine 'ridge of the knife/edge') is the site of a stone circle in the townland of Drumskinny, County Fermanagh, Northern Ireland. With the inclusion of an adjacent cairn and alignment, the stone circle is a State Care Historic Monument in Fermanagh and Omagh district, at grid ref: H 2009 7072. The site was discovered in 1934 and excavated in 1962 and is believed to have been built around 2000 BC.

The circle is 43 feet in diameter and appears to similar to the Beaghmore stone circles found in County Tyrone. Drumskinny originally had 39 stones which ranged in size, thickness and height.

There are also two other townlands in Northern Ireland called Drumskinny: in the civil parish of Clonfeacle in County Tyrone; and in the civil parish of Dromore also in County Tyrone.

== See also ==
- List of archaeological sites in County Fermanagh
- List of townlands in County Fermanagh
