= Magheraculmoney =

Magheraculmoney: Irish: Machaire Cul Muine
- District: Fermanagh and Omagh
- County: County Fermanagh
- Country: Northern Ireland
- Sovereign state: United Kingdom
- Postcode district: BT
- Dialling code: 028
- UK Parliament: Fermanagh and South Tyrone
- NI Assembly: Fermanagh and South Tyrone

Magheraculmoney (from Irish Machaire Cul Muine, meaning 'plain at the back of the shrubbery') is a civil parish in County Fermanagh, Northern Ireland. It is situated in the historic barony of Lurg.

== Towns and villages ==
The civil parish contains the villages of Ederny, Kesh and Lack.

== Townlands ==
The civil parish contains the following townlands:

- Aghagaffert
- Aghaleague
- Aghama
- Agharainy
- Aghinver
- Ardatrave
- Ardess Glebe
- Ardore
- Ardvarny East
- Ardvarny West
- Ballynant
- Barnalackan
- Cady
- Camplany
- Carn
- Carrickagreany
- Clareview
- Cleenishgarve Island
- Cleenishmeen Island
- Cloy
- Cornacrea
- Crevinish
- Crevinishaughy Island
- Croneen
- Croneen Barr
- Davy's Island
- Diviny
- Drumadraghy
- Drumard
- Drumbane
- Drumbarna
- Drumcahy
- Drumcose
- Drumcrin
- Drumgivery
- Drumhoney
- Drumkeen
- Drummacalara
- Drummoyagh
- Drumnacross
- Drumnarullagh
- Drumreane
- Drumsawna Beg
- Drumsawna More
- Drumwhinny
- Edenaclogh
- Edenagee
- Edenamoghil Black
- Edenamoghil Umder
- Edenclaw Great
- Edenclaw Little
- Ederny
- Fargrim
- Gargrim
- Gay island
- Glasmullagh
- Glenarn
- Goladoo
- Gorteen
- Gubbaroe
- Inismakill
- Killycappy
- Killylea
- Kilsmullan
- Kiltierney
- Kinnausy Island
- Lack
- Largy
- Lavaran
- Leaghan
- Letterboy
- Lisingle
- Lurganboy
- Manoo
- Mantlin
- Meenmore
- Mullaghfarne
- Mullanasaggart
- Mullanrody
- Nedsherry
- Parkhill
- Rabbit Island
- Raw
- Rosscah
- Rosscolban
- Shanmullagh
- Sheemuldoon
- Slievebane
- Stranadarriff
- Stranahone
- Tattykeel Lower
- Tattykeel Upper
- Tom's Island
- Tullanaginn
- Tullanaglare
- Tullanaglug
- Tullanaguiggy
- Tullycallrick
- White Island

== See also ==
- List of civil parishes of County Fermanagh
