= Tawnaghgorm, County Fermanagh =

Townland (administrative area) in Northern Ireland

Tawnaghgorm, County Fermanagh: Irish: Tamhnach Gorm
- District: Fermanagh and Omagh
- County: County Fermanagh
- Country: Northern Ireland
- Sovereign state: United Kingdom
- Postcode district: BT93
- Dialling code: 028
- UK Parliament: Fermanagh and South Tyrone
- NI Assembly: Fermanagh and South Tyrone

Tawnaghgorm (from Irish Tamhnach Gorm, meaning 'blue or green flat field') is a townland of 162 acres in County Fermanagh, Northern Ireland. It is situated in the civil parish of Belleek and the historic barony of Lurg.

== See also ==
- List of townlands in County Fermanagh
