= Fil Campbell =

Irish traditional singer (born 1958)

Fil Campbell (born 1958) is an Irish folk singer from Belleek, County Fermanagh, on the border with County Donegal.

== Biography ==
Campbell was born in Belleek, County Fermanagh. She is known for her work in Irish traditional and folk music, particularly during the 1980s. Together with her husband and percussionist Tom McFarland, they created the TV show Songbirds.
