= Furnish =

Furnish is a surname. Notable people with the surname include:

- David Furnish (born 1962), Canadian filmmaker
- William M. Furnish (1912–2007), American paleontologist
- Furnish, an aqueous suspension of cellulose fibers from which paper is made
