= Corranny =

- Location within Ireland
- Coordinates: 54°14′59″N 7°16′12″W
- Country: Northern Ireland
- County: County Fermanagh
- Electoral Division: Carnmore
- Barony: Clankelly

Area
  - Total: 0.5467 km^{2} (0.2111 sq mi)

Corranny (Irish: Corr Eanaigh) is a village in Northern Ireland.
