= Samuel B. Horne =

American Civil War Medal of Honor recipient

Samuel Belton Horne
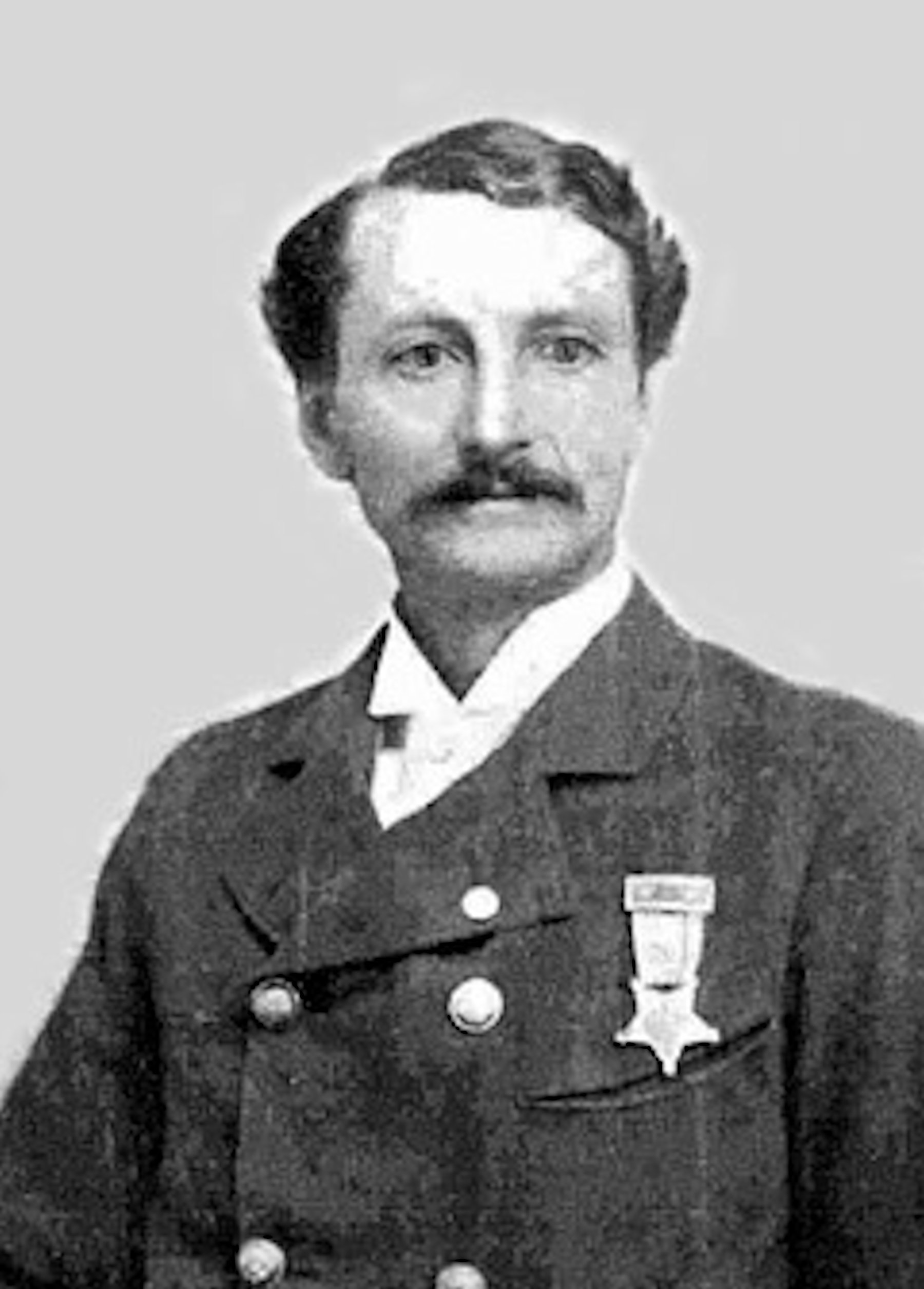
- Horne in c. 1889
- Born: May 3, 1843; Belleek, Ireland
- Died: September 18, 1928 (aged 85); Connecticut, US
- Burial place: Winsted, Connecticut, US
- Military career
- Allegiance: United States
- Branch: United States Army
- Rank: Captain
- Unit: 11th Connecticut Infantry Regiment
- Conflicts: American Civil War
- Awards: Medal of Honor

Samuel Belton Horne (March 3, 1843 – September 18, 1928) was an American soldier who fought in the American Civil War. Horne received the United States' highest award for bravery during combat, the Medal of Honor. Horne's medal was won for heroism at Fort Harrison, Virginia, on September 29, 1864. He was honored with the award on November 19, 1897.

Horne was born in Belleek, Ireland, and entered service in Winsted, Connecticut, where he was later buried.

== Medal of Honor citation ==
The President of the United States of America, in the name of Congress, takes pleasure in presenting the Medal of Honor to Captain (Infantry) Samuel Belton Horne, United States Army, for extraordinary heroism on 29 September 1864, while serving with Company H, 11th Connecticut Infantry, in action at Fort Harrison, Virginia. While acting as an Aide and carrying an important message, Captain Horne was severely wounded and his horse killed but he delivered the order and rejoined his general.

== See also ==
- List of American Civil War Medal of Honor recipients: G–L
