= Salry =

Locality in Northern Ireland

Coordinates: 54.2453°N 7.3647°W

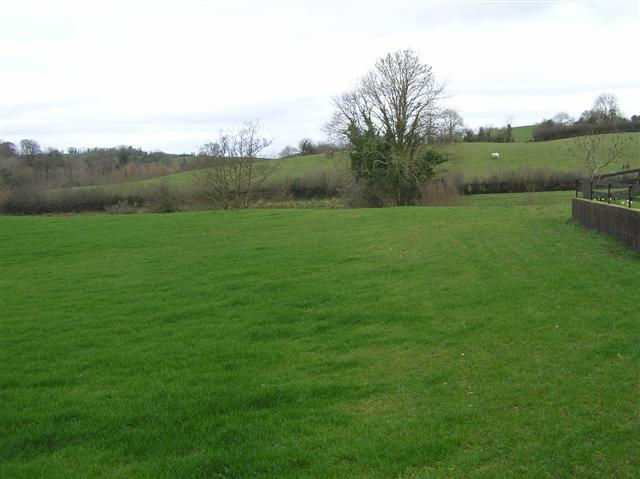

- Location within Northern Ireland
- District: Fermanagh and Omagh
- County: County Fermanagh
- Country: Northern Ireland
- Sovereign state: United Kingdom
- Postcode district: BT
- Dialling code: 028
- Police: Northern Ireland
- Fire: Northern Ireland
- Ambulance: Northern Ireland
- UK Parliament: Fermanagh and South Tyrone
- NI Assembly: Fermanagh and South Tyrone

Salry is a townland and locality in Magheracross civil parish, County Fermanagh, Northern Ireland. It is located at 54° 24' 53" N, 7° 36' 47" W. Salry is in the Barony of Tirkennedy and is 212.98 acres in area.
