= Hill's Island =

Island in Davidson County, Tennessee, United States

Coordinates: 36°15′07″N 86°40′00″W

Hill's Island is an island on the Cumberland River in Davidson County, Tennessee, USA. It is the fourth smallest island between Old Hickory Dam and Cheatham Dam. The island is only accessible by boat. The town of Madison, Tennessee can be seen from the island.

== History ==
The island was originally home to Native Americans. It was settled by the Donelson family in the 1780s. Later, it was acquired by Henry R.W. Hill, who ran a plantation with slave labor at this location. By the 1880s, it was purchased by Ellen G. White. The island was then used by the Seventh-day Adventist Church.

The island was donated by the Adventist Health System to the Tennessee Parks and Greenways Foundation in 2006. As of 2015, the foundation planned to turn the island into an education opportunity for schoolchildren to experience the Tennessee wilderness. The island is home to "deer, turkey, herons, raccoons, snakes, otters, and a bald eagle."
