= List of civil parishes of County Fermanagh =

In Ireland, counties are divided into civil parishes and parishes are further divided into townlands. The following is a list of parishes in County Fermanagh, Northern Ireland:

== A ==
Arney, Aghalurcher, Aghavea, Aghavea-Aughintaine

== B ==
Belleek, Boho, Botha

== C ==
Clogher, Clones, Culmaine

== D ==
Derrybrusk, Derryvullan, Devenish, Drumkeeran, Drummully

== E ==
Enniskillen

== G ==
Galloon

== I ==
Inishmacsaint, Inis Muighe Samh

== K ==
Killesher, Kinawley, Kilskeery

== M ==
Magheracross, Magheraculmoney

== P ==
Pobal

== R ==
Rossory, Roslea

== T ==
Templecarn, Tomregan, Trory

== See also ==
- List of townlands in County Fermanagh
