= Derrybrusk =

Civil parish in Northern Ireland

Derrybrusk: Irish: Doire Broscaidh
- County: County Fermanagh
- Country: Northern Ireland
- Sovereign state: United Kingdom
- Police: Northern Ireland
- Fire: Northern Ireland
- Ambulance: Northern Ireland

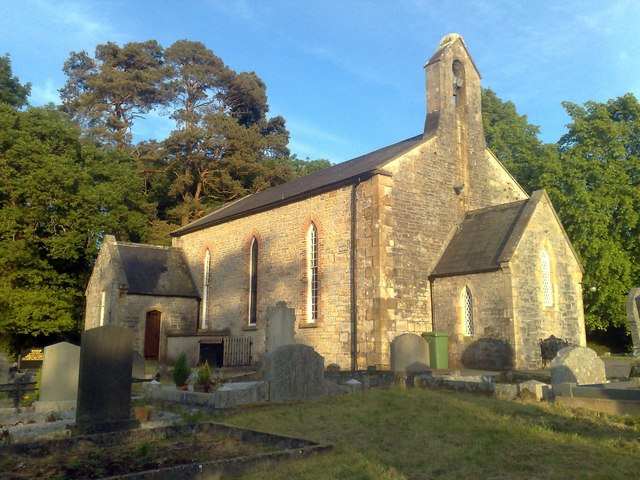
St Michael's Church of Ireland Church, Derrybrusk, in 2009

Derrybrusk is a civil parish and townland (of 204 acres) in County Fermanagh, Northern Ireland. The civil parish is mainly situated in the historic barony of Tirkennedy with a small portion (the two townlands of Aghnacarra and Gola) in the barony of Magherastephana. Derrybrusk townland is in the portion of the parish of the same name in Tirkennedy.

== Civil parish of Derrybrusk ==
The civil parish includes the village of Carrybridge.

=== Townlands ===
The civil parish includes the following townlands:

=== A ===
Aghnacarra

=== B ===
Ballyreagh, Bonnybrook

=== C ===
Cappy, Coolnashanton

=== D ===
Derrybrusk, Drumcrow, Drumcullion, Drumrainy

=== F ===
Fyagh

=== G ===
Glasdrumman, Glasmullagh, Gola

=== K ===
Killygrania, Killyreagh, Kilnamaddy, Kilsallagh

=== L ===
Largy

=== R ===
Ring

=== T ===
Tawnyreagh, Thomastown, Tullyharney

=== W ===
Whinnigan Glebe

== See also ==
- List of townlands in County Fermanagh
- List of civil parishes of County Fermanagh
