= Carr, County Fermanagh =

Townland in Northern Ireland

- Townland
- Location within the United Kingdom
- Coordinates: 54.373°N 7.792°W
- Country: United Kingdom
- Division: Northern Ireland
- County: County Fermanagh

Carr or Corr (from Irish Carr 'rock') is a townland in County Fermanagh, Northern Ireland. The area is situated in the civil parish of Boho and contains Carron Lough which is reputed to be quite deep and also the Sillees River. It is situated within Fermanagh and Omagh district.

The area is noted for the discovery of a Bronze Age sword which was uncovered whilst drainage work was in progress. This sword, which can be seen on display at the Enniskillen museum, is made of cast Bronze. Another historical artifact located in the townland was a log-boat, dated to the period 1440-1620 found in the Sillees River beside Corr Bridge.

The poet Padraic Burns (1879–1943) was a notable inhabitant of this area. Padraic Burns published a book of poems entitled "The Ulster Singer: Some lays and legends from Lough Erne" in 1941. This book was published through The North West of Ireland Printing and Publishing company and contains some of the best known works of the poet including "The Gauger Outwitted", "The Blacksmith of Belleek" and "The Fiddler from Glan".
