= Belleek, County Fermanagh =

Village and civil parish in County Fermanagh, Northern Ireland

Coordinates: 54.4821°N 8.0866°W

Belleek: Irish: Béal Leice
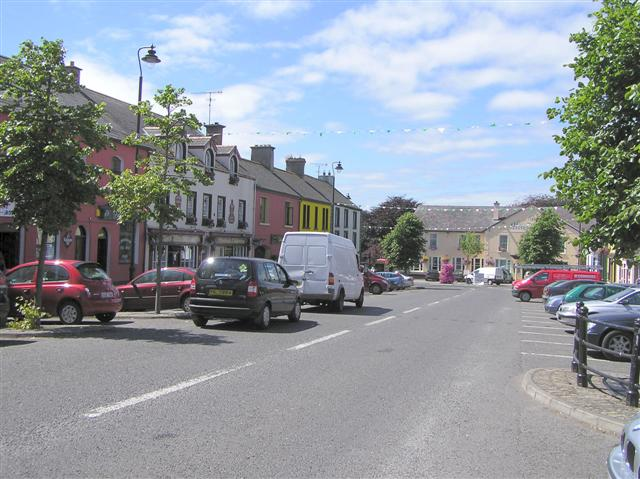

- Location within Northern Ireland
- Population: 904 (2011 Census)
- Irish grid reference: G943593
  - Belfast: 104 miles
- District: Fermanagh and Omagh
- County: County Fermanagh
- Country: Northern Ireland
- Sovereign state: United Kingdom
- Post town: ENNISKILLEN
- Postcode district: BT93
- Dialling code: 028
- UK Parliament: Fermanagh and South Tyrone
- NI Assembly: Fermanagh and South Tyrone

Belleek (from Irish Béal Leice 'mouth of the flagstones') is a large village and civil parish in County Fermanagh, Northern Ireland. While the greater part of the village lies within County Fermanagh, part of it crosses the border and the River Erne into County Donegal. It lies in the historic barony of Lurg. It had a population of 904 people in the 2011 Census, and is situated within Fermanagh and Omagh district, around 7 kilometres (4 mi) east of Ballyshannon.

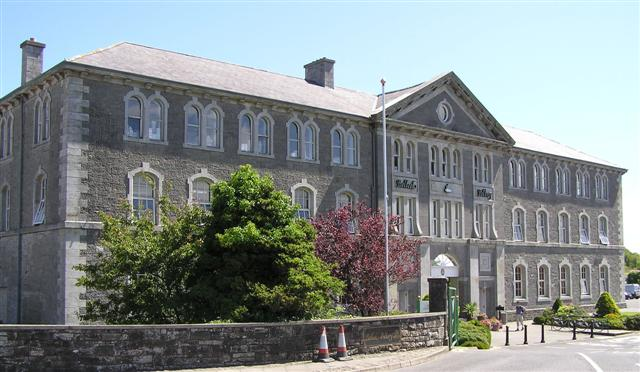
Belleek Pottery, County Fermanagh

July is normally the warmest month in Northern Ireland, and the highest summer temperatures of all occur inland, furthest away from the cooling influence of the Atlantic. A long-standing high temperature record for Northern Ireland (30.8 °C) was recorded at Knockarevan in County Fermanagh on 30 June 1976, which was not surpassed until the heatwave of July 2021 (peaking at 31.4 °C, recorded at Armagh).

The village is the most westerly settlement in Northern Ireland and thus the most westerly settlement in the United Kingdom. The majority of the pottery is still produced in Belleek today using the same procedures of over 165 years.

== History ==
There is evidence of Neolithic settlers in the area, and later legend has it that Fionn mac Cumhail's men sharpened their swords on the big limestone rock at Belleek Falls. (The flagstone, which gave its name to the area, was destroyed together with the falls during drainage works in the 1880s). The Battle of Belleek 1593, also known as the Battle of the Erne Fords, took place in the build-up to the Nine Years' War.

Belleek along with Pettigo was occupied in the summer of 1922 in an action by elements of the I.R.A. during their Northern offensive designed to undermine the position of Northern Ireland. Two companies of regular British Army troops, sent in by the Secretary of State for the Colonies, Winston Churchill, in what was known as The Battle of Belleek, used artillery to dislodge them from the town and Battery fort situated in County Donegal overlooking the town. The British Army remained at the fort until August 1924. Belleek was one of several Catholic border villages in Fermanagh that would have been transferred to the Irish Free State had the recommendations of the Irish Boundary Commission been enacted in 1925.

=== The Troubles ===
Located on the border, there were a number of incidents in Belleek during the Troubles – which resulted in eight fatalities between 1972 and 1992.

== Places of interest ==
Three stained glass windows were also unveiled in Belleek Church of Ireland in May 2009 to commemorate the founders of Belleek Pottery, John Caldwell Bloomfield, the local landowner, Robert Williams Armstrong, architect, ceramics expert and first manager of Belleek Pottery and David McBirney, Dublin who provided the finance for the project; all were members of the Church of Ireland.

Castle Caldwell Forest Walk lies four miles outside Belleek at the western end of Lower Lough Erne. Castle Caldwell was originally built in 1612. Lower Lough Erne is home to various protected wildlife, including Sandwich tern, Eurasian curlew, lapwing, redshank, and common snipe colonies. The Royal Society for the Protection of Birds keeps up-to-date records as to colony numbers and well-being.

== Transport ==
Bus Éireann offers routes to Enniskillen and then to major cities and towns in the Republic of Ireland including Cavan and Dublin. Many bus services meet and hopefully connect with each other's timetables in nearby Ballyshannon in County Donegal, where onward connections can be made. Ulsterbus provide limited connections on the longer route via Belcoo to Enniskillen.

The Enniskillen and Bundoran Railway served Belleek railway station from 1868 until 1957.

The nearest railway station to Belleek is Sligo railway station which is served by trains to Dublin Connolly and is operated by Iarnród Éireann.

== Economy ==
Belleek Pottery Ltd has long been a major employer in the region, with its visitor centre attracting 150,000 guests per annum. Fermanagh District Council reports that 70% of Belleek Pottery's product is manufactured for export. Belleek also hosts a street mart every third Tuesday of the month, where a variety of goods can be bought and sold. This mart is much reduced compared to its 1980's vitality when its cants would stretch across the border

== Demographics ==
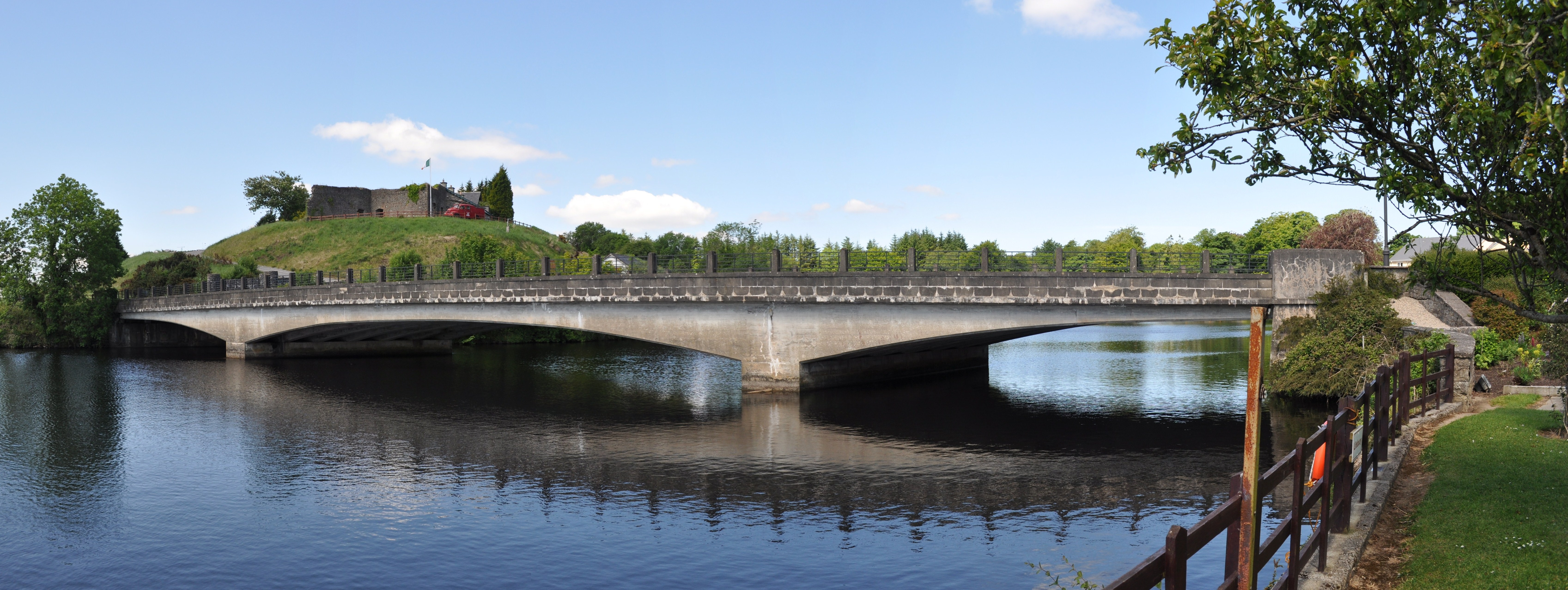
Bridge connecting Northern Ireland to the Republic of Ireland

=== 2001 Census ===
Belleek is classified as a small village or hamlet by the NI Statistics and Research Agency (NISRA) (i.e. with a population between 500 and 1,000 people). On the day of the 2001 census (29 April 2001) there were 836 people living in Belleek. Of these:

- 26.4% were aged under 16 and 22.1% were aged 60 and over
- 46.8% of the population were male and 53.2% were female
- 87.8% were from a Catholic background and 11.6% were from a Protestant background
- 4.5% of people aged 16–74 were unemployed.

=== 2011 Census ===
On Census Day (27 March 2011) the usually resident population of Belleek (Fermanagh Lgd) Settlement was 904 accounting for 0.05% of the NI total.

- 99.00% were from the white (including Irish Traveller) ethnic group;
- 88.50% belong to or were brought up in the Catholic religion and 8.96% belong to or were brought up in a 'Protestant and Other Christian (including Christian related)' religion; and
- 11.73% indicated that they had a British national identity, 58.85% had an Irish national identity and 30.20% had a Northern Irish national identity*.
- Respondents could indicate more than one national identity

On Census Day 27 March 2011, in Belleek (Fermanagh Lgd) Settlement, considering the population aged 3 years old and over:

- 21.91% had some knowledge of Irish;
- 3.11% had some knowledge of Ulster-Scots; and
- 1.27% did not have English as their first language.

== Sport ==
The local Gaelic Athletic Association club is called Erne Gaels (Gaeil na hÉirne).

== Notable residents ==
- Dr Edward Daly (1933–2016), Roman Catholic Bishop of Derry from 1974 to 1993, was born in Belleek.
- Fill Campbell, Irish traditional musician.
- Tom Daly, SDLP politician, brother of Edward Daly, all grew up in Belleek.
- Samuel B. Horne (1843–1928), a Medal of Honor recipient in the American Civil War, was born in Belleek on 3 March 1843.
- Kate Smith, former presenter and journalist (UTV).

== Civil parish of Belleek ==
The civil parish contains the village of Belleek.

=== Townlands ===
The civil parish contains the following townlands:

- Ballaghgee Glebe
- Ballymagaghran
- Bellanadohy
- Buck Island
- Carrowkeel Glebe
- Commons
- Derrychulloo
- Derrynacrannog Glebe
- Derryrona Glebe
- Druminillar
- Dulrush
- Eagle Island
- Ferny Island
- Finner
- Gadalough Glebe
- Garvary
- Graffy
- Keenaghan
- Larkhill
- Leggs
- Lowerybane
- Magheramenagh
- Mallybreen
- Meenatully
- Oughterdrum
- Rathmore
- Rossbeg
- Rossharbour
- Rossmore
- Rough Island
- Scardans Lower
- Scardans Upper
- Tawnaghgorm
- Tawnynoran Glebe
- Tievealough Glebe
- Tiragannon Glebe
- Tullychurry
- Tullyfad
- Tullylough
- Tullynabohoge
- Tullyvogy

== See also ==
- List of towns and villages in Northern Ireland
- List of civil parishes of County Fermanagh
