= Relagh =

Townland (administrative division) in Northern Ireland

Coordinates: 54.2329°N 7.3450°W

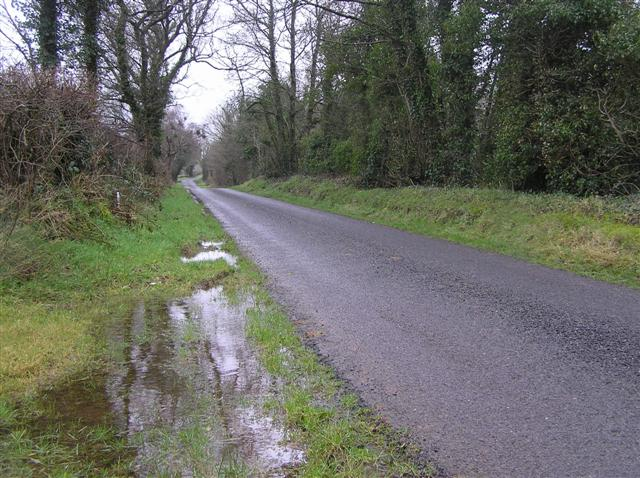

- Location within Northern Ireland
- District: Fermanagh and Omagh
- County: County Fermanagh
- Country: Northern Ireland
- Sovereign state: United Kingdom
- Postcode district: BT
- Dialling code: 028
- Police: Northern Ireland
- Fire: Northern Ireland
- Ambulance: Northern Ireland
- UK Parliament: Fermanagh and South Tyrone
- NI Assembly: Fermanagh and South Tyrone

Relagh is a locality and townland in County Fermanagh, Northern Ireland. Relagh is located at 54° 23' 29" N, 7° 34' 50" W and is 3km north of Enniskillen and southeast of Ballinamallard. It is in the Magheracross Civil Parish.
