= Lavaran =

Lavaran لاوران
- Village
- Location within Iran
- Coordinates: 26°46′30″N 54°23′37″E
- Country: Iran
- Province: Hormozgan
- County: Bandar Lengeh
- Bakhsh: Central
- Rural District: Moghuyeh

Population (2006)
  - Total: 103
- Time zone: UTC+3:30 (IRST)
  - Summer (DST): UTC+4:30 (IRDT)

Lavaran (Persian: لاوران, also Romanized as Lāvarān) is a village in Moghuyeh Rural District, in the Central District of Bandar Lengeh County, Hormozgan Province, Iran. At the 2006 census, its population was 103, in 18 families.
