= Drummacoorin =

Archaeological site in Northern Ireland

Drummacoorin (from Irish Droim Achadh an Fhuarain 'ridge of the field of the spring well') is situated in the area of Boho in South West Fermanagh, Northern Ireland in the old Barony of Clanawley. There are also reports of the area variously being known as Drommcruorin (1609) and Druim ic Cuaireann or MacCurrin's ridge (1833).

Drummacoorin is notable due to its archeological finds which include a Bronze Age sword which is dated at approximately 1000 BC (displayed in the Ashmolean Museum) and Neolithic axe heads which were discovered in the area in 2008.

== See also ==
- List of archaeological sites in County Fermanagh
