= Lusty Beg Island =

Island in County Fermanagh, Northern Ireland

Coordinates: 54.5083°N 7.8312°W

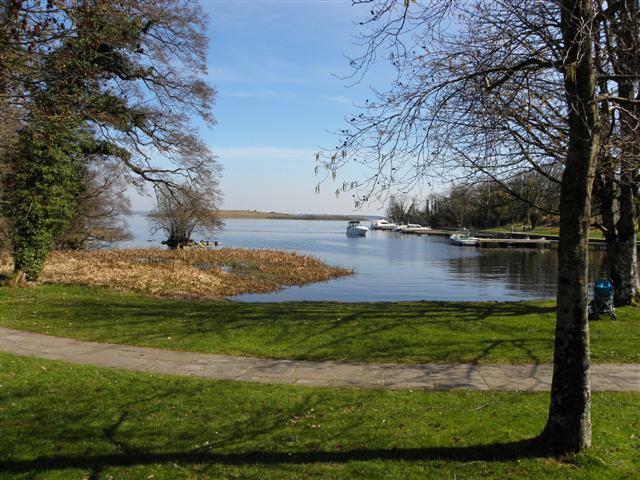
Lusty Beg Island, April 2010

Lusty Beg Island (from Irish Lóiste Beag 'little lodge') is a private island located in Lower Lough Erne, in County Fermanagh, Northern Ireland, directly adjacent to Boa Island. It is roughly 75 acres and the location of Lusty Beg Island Resort and Spa, which operates an on-demand ferry service between the island and Boa Island.

== See also ==
- List of townlands in County Fermanagh
