= Currin, County Fermanagh =

Townland in County Fermanagh, Northern Ireland

Coordinates: 54°24′7″N 7°35′17″W

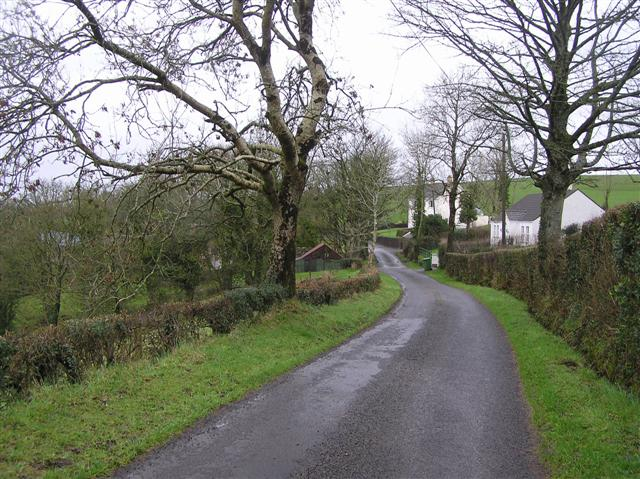
Currin Road, on the way to Ballinamallard

Currin, is a townland in the civil parish of Magheracross in County Fermanagh, Northern Ireland. Currin is 327.46 acres in area.

St Patrick is said to have come through the Currin area in 450AD. St Columba passed through the area in 550 AD and nearby Magheracross Monastery was founded about 749. In 1867, Currin was reported to have had one Presbyterian and two Catholic churches, and three schools. Also a fair was held on 6 May.
