= Lough Erne =

Lake system in Northern Ireland

- Loch Éirne (Irish)
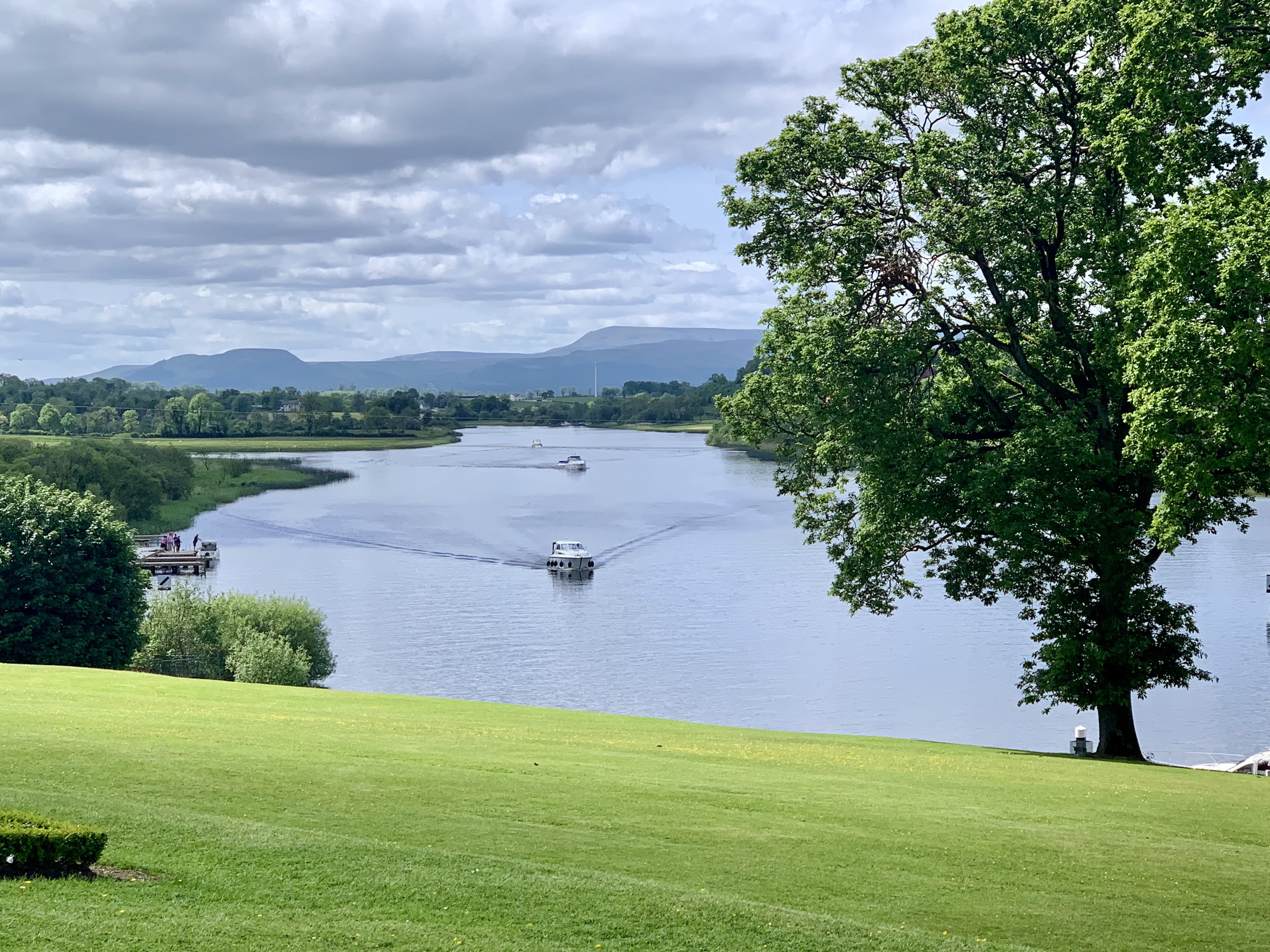
- Boats travelling through Lough Erne

- Location within Northern Ireland

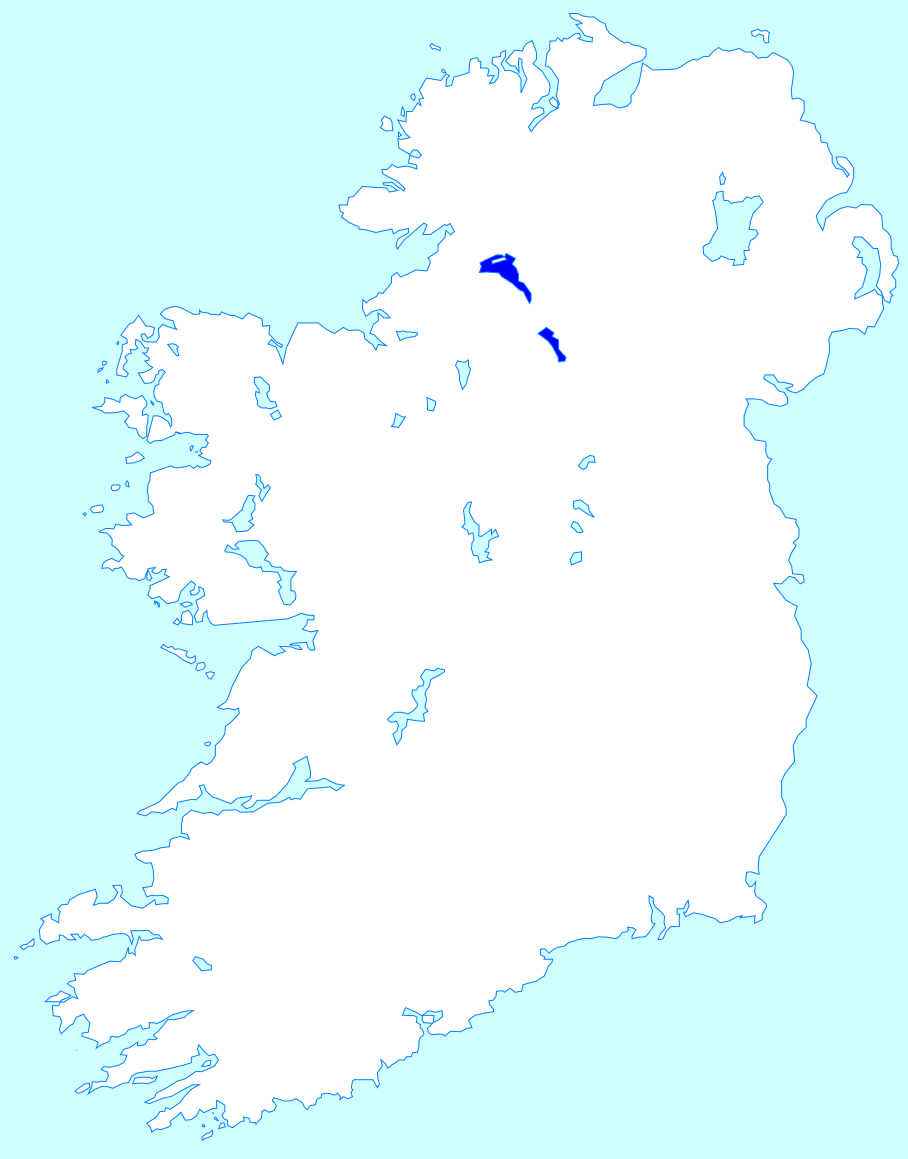
- Location: County Fermanagh, Northern Ireland
- Coordinates: 54°28′N 7°49′W
- Primary inflows: River Erne
- Primary outflows: River Erne
- Catchment area: 1,680 mi^{2} (4,350 km^{2})
- Basin countries: Northern Ireland and Republic of Ireland
- Max. length: Lower: ~26 mi (42 km); Upper: ~12 mi (19 km)
- Surface area: Lower: ~42.3 mi^{2} (110 km^{2}); Upper: ~13.3 mi^{2} (34 km^{2})
- Average depth: Lower: ~39 ft (12 m); Upper: ~7.5 ft (2.3 m)
- Max. depth: 213.25 ft (65.00 m)
- Islands: 150+
- Settlements: Enniskillen, Belturbet, Belleek, Pettigo, Kesh, Trory, Ballycassidy, Killadeas, Derrylin

Ramsar Wetland
- Official name: Upper Lough Erne
- Designated: 4 March 1997
- Reference no.: 896

Lough Erne (/lɒx ɜːrn/ LOKH URN, from Irish Loch Éirne) is two connected lakes in County Fermanagh, Northern Ireland. It is the second-largest lake system in Northern Ireland and Ulster, and the fourth largest in Ireland. The lakes are widened sections of the River Erne, which flows north and then curves west into the Atlantic. The smaller southern lake is called the Upper Lough as it is higher up the river. The larger northern lake is called the Lower Lough or Broad Lough. The town of Enniskillen lies on the short stretch of river between the lakes. The lake has more than 150 islands, along with many coves and inlets. The River Erne is 80 miles (129 km) long and drains an area of about 1,680 square miles (4,350 km^{2}).

== Name, mythology and folklore ==
Lough Erne (Irish: Loch Éirne) appears to be named after an ancient population group called the Érainn, or after a goddess from which the Érainn took their name. Since tribes were often named after a divine ancestor, T. F. O'Rahilly suggested that the Érainn took their name from a goddess named Érann and that Loch Éirne probably means 'lake of (the goddess) Érann'. O'Rahilly and other scholars have connected these names to Ériu (modern Éire), the goddess after which Ireland is named. He writes that the earlier forms of these goddess names were Everna/Iverna and Everiu/Iveriu and that both come from "the Indo-European root ei-, implying motion". In his view Érann and Ériu would thus appear to mean "she who travels regularly", explained as "the sun-goddess, for the sun was the great celestial Traveller". Alternatively, John T. Koch suggests that Ériu was a mother goddess whose name comes from an Indo-European word stem meaning "fat, rich, fertile".

In Irish mythology and folklore, there are three tales about the lake's origins. One says that it is named after a mythical woman named Erne, Queen Méabh's lady-in-waiting at Cruachan. Erne and her maidens were frightened away from Cruachan when a fearsome giant emerged from the cave of Oweynagat. They fled northward and drowned in a river or lake, their bodies dissolving to become Lough Erne. Patricia Monaghan notes that "The drowning of a goddess in a river is common in Irish mythology and typically represents the dissolving of her divine power into the water, which then gives life to the land". Another tale says that it was formed when a magical spring-well overflowed, similar to the tale of Lough Neagh. The third says that, during a battle between the Érainn and the army of High King Fíachu Labrainne, it burst from the ground and drowned the Érainn. In Cath Maige Tuired ("the Battle of Moytura"), it is listed as one of the twelve chief loughs of Ireland. Historically, the lake was also called Loch Saimer (Samhaoir). In folklore Partholón killed his wife's favourite hound, Saimer, in a fit of jealous rage, and the lake was named after it.

Lough Erne is the setting of a folk tale known as "The Story of Conn-eda" or "The Golden Apples of Lough Erne", which appears in Fairy and Folk Tales of the Irish Peasantry (1888). In the tale, Conn-eda goes on a quest to procure three golden apples, a black steed and a supernatural hound from a city underneath Lough Erne. The city is ruled by a king of the Fir Bolg.

== History ==
The Menapii are the only known Celtic tribe specifically named on Ptolemy’s AD 150 map of Ireland, where they located their first colony, Menapia, on the Leinster coast circa 216 BC. They later settled around Lough Erne, becoming known as the Fir Manach, and giving their name to Fermanagh and Monaghan. Mongán mac Fiachnai, a 7th-century King of Ulster, is the protagonist of several legends linking him with Manannán mac Lir. They spread across Ireland, evolving into historic Irish (also Scottish and Manx) clans.

The Annals of Ulster were written in the late 15th century on Belle Isle, an island in Upper Lough Erne.

During the Second World War, RAF Castle Archdale was based on Lough Erne, providing an essential airbase for the Battle of the Atlantic and the battle against U-boats. A secret agreement with the Irish Government permitted flying boats based there to fly West straight across neutral Ireland to the Atlantic, avoiding the two-hour detour that would have been necessary for aeroplanes based in Northern Ireland. This flight path became known as 'The Donegal Corridor'. An example of the many ways Ireland assisted the allies while remaining neutral.

In November 2012, it was announced that the Lough Erne Resort, a hotel on the southern shore of the Lower Lough, would host the 39th G8 summit.

== Geography ==
=== Islands ===
The lakes contain many small islands and peninsulas, which are also called "islands" because of the highly convoluted shoreline and because many of them were islands prior to two extensive drainage schemes in the 1880s and the 1950s which dropped the water level by about 5 feet (1.5 metres). The Parliamentary Gazetteer of 1846 stated, "The islands are popularly fabled to be as numerous as the days of the year; but they have been more soberly estimated at 90 in the Upper Lake and 109 in the Lower".

The largest islands are Inishmore at the northern end of Upper Lough Erne (not to be confused with "Inish More or Davy's Island" in Lower Lough Erne) and Galloon Island at the lower end of Upper Lough Erne. Whether these are entirely bounded by the lake, or partly bounded by the River Erne, is a matter of opinion. The next largest is Boa Island, within Lower Lough Erne. All three of these comprise multiple townlands. Many of the next largest islands constitute a single townland.

Islands in the lower lake include Boa Island, Cleenishmeen Island, Crevinishaughy Island, Cruninish Island, Devenish Island, Ely Island, Goat Island, Horse Island, Inish Doney, Inish Fovar, Inish Lougher, Inish More or Davy's Island, Inis Rath, Inishmacsaint, Inishmakill, Lustybeg Island, Lustymore Island and White Island.

Those in the upper lake include Bleanish Island, Crehan Island, Dernish Island, Inishcorkish, Inishcrevan, Inishfendra, Inishleague, Inishlught, Inishrath, Inishturk, Killygowan Island, Naan Island and Trannish. Several of the islands are privately owned, and occasionally come on to the open market. In 2007 Inishturk went on the market at the price of £695,000. In 2012 Inisliroo went on the market at the price of £600,000.

The lake islands are the main Irish stronghold of the scarce garden warbler.

== Administration ==
Waterways Ireland, a cross-border organisation, established under the Good Friday Agreement in 1999, is responsible for navigation on the Erne System, as well the island of Ireland's other navigable waterways.

Department for Infrastructure Rivers retains ownership of the bed and foreshore and manages water levels within the ranges specified in the Erne Drainage and Development Act 1950. The drainage scheme was designed by Percy Shepherd. Water level control is undertaken in conjunction with the Electricity Supply Board (ESB) in the Republic of Ireland under the terms of an agreement made in 1950 when the River Erne was harnessed for hydroelectric power generation. The agreement requires that levels are maintained in the Upper Lough between 150 and 154 feet (46–47 m) between April and September, at least 155 ft (47 m) from October to March, and in the Lower Lough between 147 and 152 feet (45–46 m) These levels relate to the Irish grid datum at Poolbeg Lighthouse.

Water levels in Upper and Lower Lough Erne are managed by a control structures located at Portora in Enniskillen and by the hydroelectric power station at Cliff between Belleek and Ballyshannon, in the Republic of Ireland. During the summer period it is aimed to keep the water level at the down steam side of Portora, at or above, 150 ft to avoid the need for the gates to be closed requiring the use of the navigation lock. This is to prevent restriction to boat traffic using the navigation facilities at the peak tourist period.

Rapid draw down of water levels in the Upper Lough is prevented by the restricted capacity of the inter-lough channel section. This means that Rivers Agency must anticipate significant inflows by drawing down the loughs to ensure flood storage is available. In November 2009 the Erne system experienced a very significant flood event. The water levels were the highest recorded since the changes to the system in the 1950s.

The Erne Rivers Trust is a Rivers Trust NGO trying to help maintain the clean water in the Lough Erne catchment for all the flora and fauna.

== Sport and tourism ==
The Lough Erne area is popular for angling and watersports, with waterskiing, rowing and wakeboarding being amongst the most popular; the stretch of water alongside the Broadmeadow, Enniskillen, has hosted stages of the World Waterski Championships annually since 2005, and in 2007, a pro-wakeboard competition, 'Wakejam' was hosted by the Erne Wakeboard Club (EWC) after successful national wakeboard competitions in the previous years. Canoeing is also a popular recreational sport on the Erne.

Lough Erne Yacht Club is based in Gublusk Bay. The Lough Erne Regatta is Ireland’s oldest event for racing under sail, with a lineage beyond 1820. The RNLI has an inland lifeboat and rescue watercraft based at Gublusk with a further station at Carrybridge on the Upper lake.

Several historical sites on Lough Erne's islands attract tourists: Among them the monastic ruins on Devenish Island or the stone figures on Boa Island and White Island

The Lough Erne Golf & Hotel Resort was opened in October 2007 by Irish businessman Jim Treacy. It is situated on a 600-acre (240 ha) peninsula between Castle Hume Lough and Lower Lough Erne. On 12 May 2011 it was announced that the owner of the hotel, Castle Hume Leisure Limited, had gone into administration. The Lough Erne Resort hosted the Lough Erne Challenge in 2009 and 2010. It was also due to host the 2017 Irish Open golf tournament but the event was moved to a different venue.

== Transport ==
A canal, the Shannon–Erne Waterway, runs between the upper end of the River Shannon and the River Erne, allowing boat movements from the Shannon estuary in southwest Ireland, through the western midlands of the country, across to the northwest and out to the Atlantic again (although the final section to the Atlantic side of Belleek is not navigable).

The section of the Ulster Canal connecting Lough Erne to Clones is being planned for navigation to be restored by Waterways Ireland.

== Gallery ==
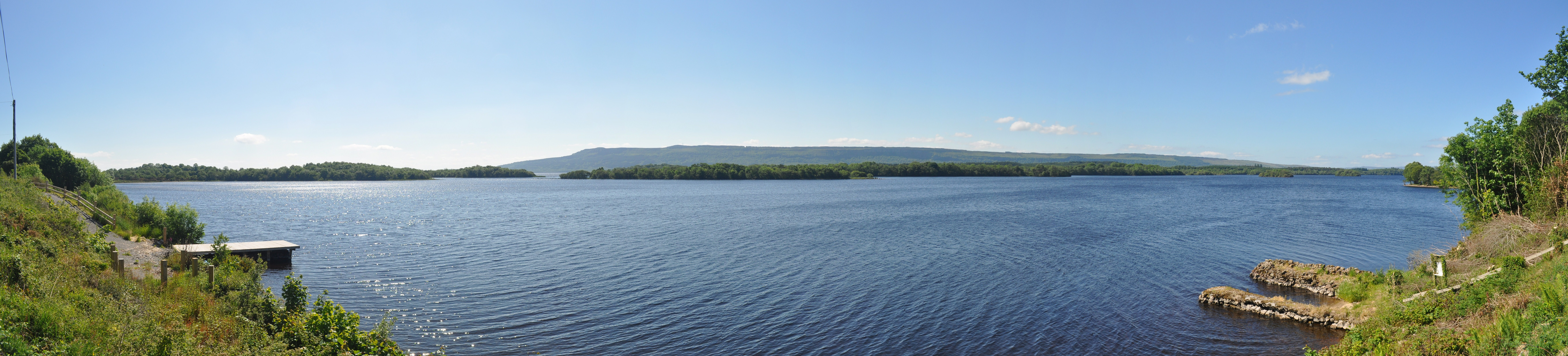
Upper Lough Erne Panorama

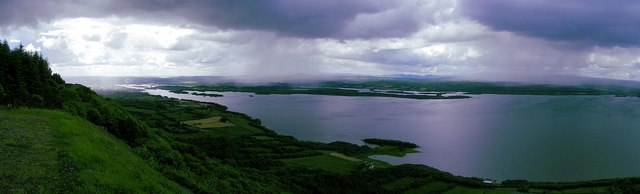
Lower Lough Erne
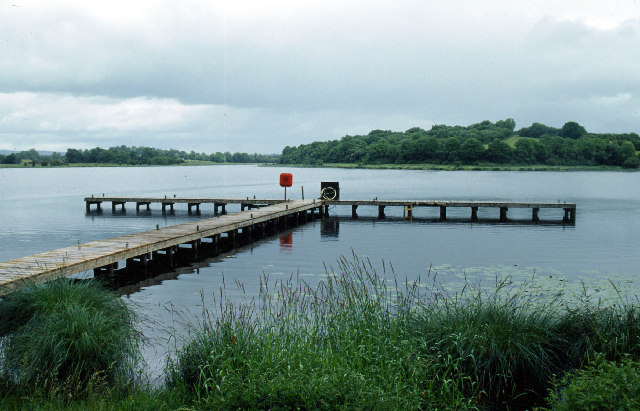
Upper Lough Erne

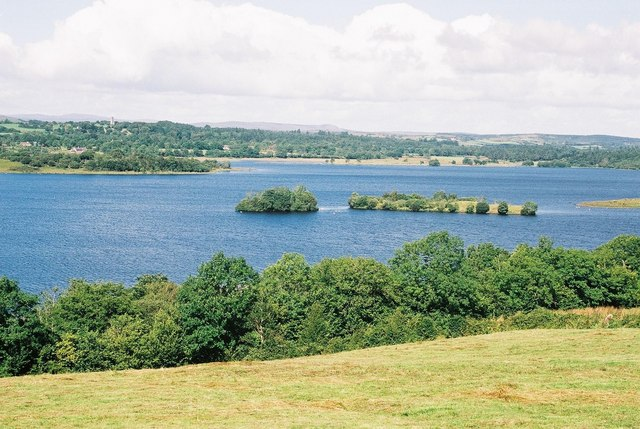
Lower Lough Erne

== See also ==
- List of loughs in Ireland
