= Devenish, County Fermanagh =

Civil parish in County Fermanagh, Northern Ireland

Coordinates: 54.388°N 7.856°W

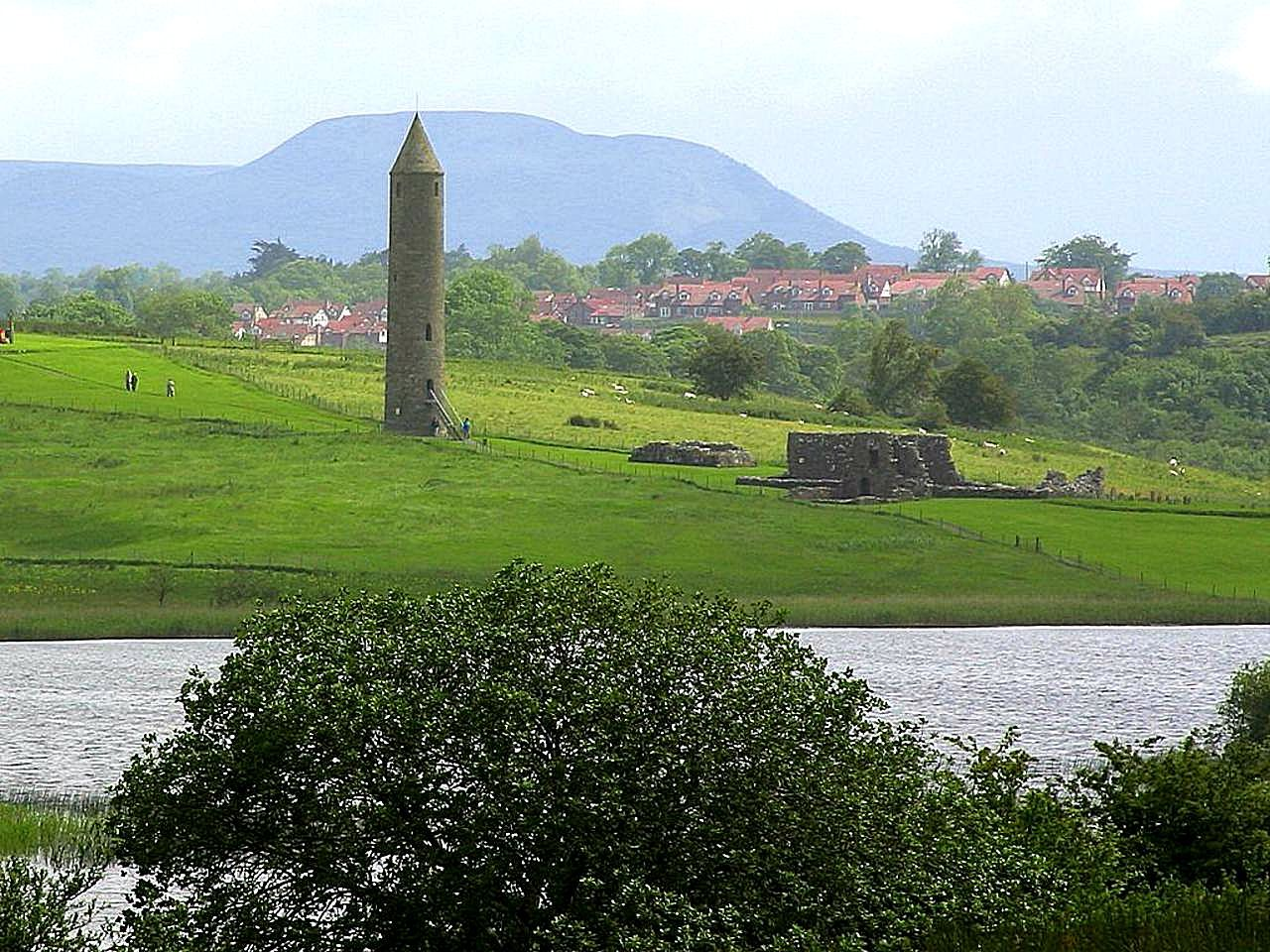
Devenish Island, within Devenish civil parish, is an island on Lough Erne with an early Christian monastery site

Devenish (Irish: Daimhinis, meaning 'ox island') is a civil parish in County Fermanagh in Northern Ireland. Located in the historical barony of Magheraboy, it is approximately 129 square kilometres (50 sq mi) in area. It takes its name from Devenish Island, which lies within the civil parish. The settlements of Garrison, Monea and Springfield are also within Devenish civil parish.

== Townlands ==
Devenish contains over 130 townlands, including Devenish Island. Some of these townlands, like Magurk’s Island at 0.8 acres (0.001 sq mi) in area, are small. Larger townlands include Rossinure More (1,130 acres (2 sq mi) in area). Levally Upper and Levally Lower (from Irish Leathbhaile, meaning 'half-townland') are also within Devenish civil parish.

== See also ==
- List of townlands of County Fermanagh
- List of civil parishes of County Fermanagh
