= Lurg =

Coordinates: 54°30′37″N 7°48′48″W

Lurg Lorg (Irish)
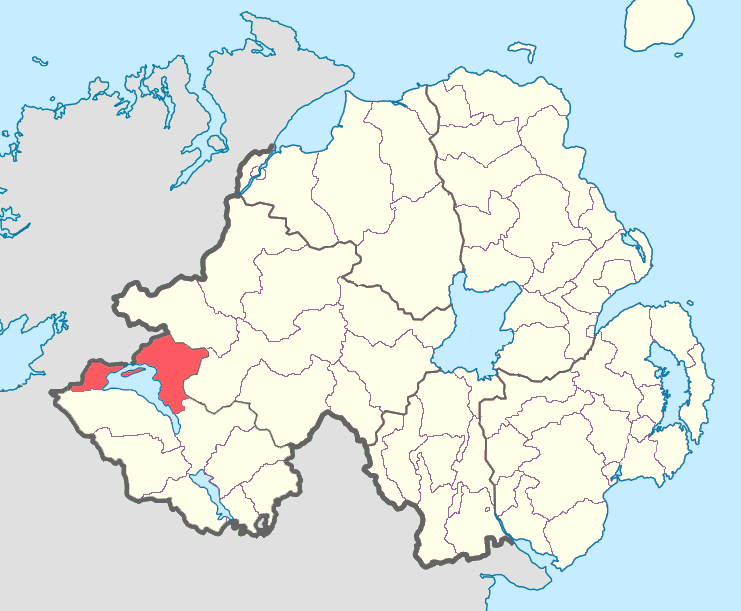
- Location of Lurg, County Fermanagh, Northern Ireland.
- Sovereign state: United Kingdom
- Country: Northern Ireland
- County: Fermanagh

Lurg (from Irish Lorg 'mark, trail or track') is a barony situated in the north of County Fermanagh, Northern Ireland. To its south lies Lower Lough Erne, and it is bordered by four other baronies in Northern Ireland: Magheraboy to the south; Tirkennedy to the south-east; Omagh West to the north; and Omagh East to the east. It also borders to the west the barony of Tirhugh in the Republic of Ireland.

== History ==
The barony of Lurg is based on the ancient Irish territory of Tuath Luirg, also known as Fir Luirg (the men of Lurg), who are claimed to be genealogically related to the Airgialla. This territory was the patrimonial inheritance of the O'Muldoon (Irish: Ó Maoldúin). It is listed in the Annals, under the name Lorg, as being a kingdom in the year 1039.

Prior to this, Lurg was the base of the O'Monaghan (Irish: Ó Manacháin), thought to be descended from the original inhabitants of the area, the Fir Manach, from which County Fermanagh gets its name.

According to 19th century genealogist John O'Hart, the barony was also home to the Muintir Taithligh "chiefs of Hy-Laoghaire, of Lough Lir, a district which lay in the barony of Lurg, near Lough Erne, towards Tyrone."

O'Hart also notes that the lord of Lurg in A.D. 924, Fergus MacDuilgen, is listed in the Annals of the Four Masters, although not chronicled in the lists of families and clans of the scholar poet Seán Mór Ó Dubhagáin.

== List of main settlements ==
- Belleek (north of the River Erne)
- Ederney
- Irvinestown
- Kesh

== List of civil parishes ==
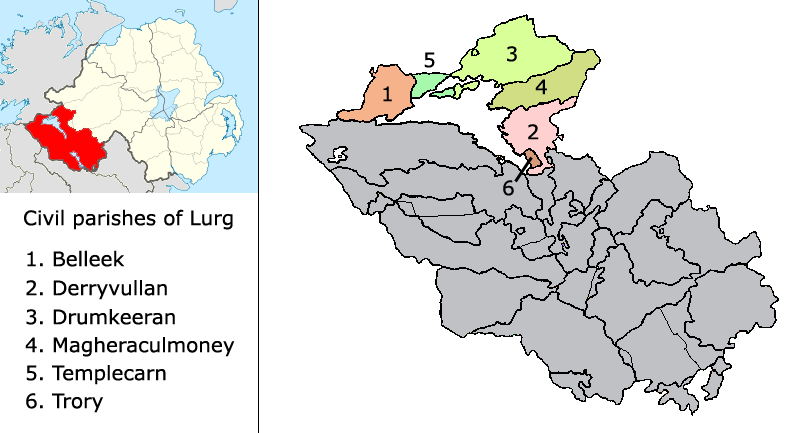
Civil parishes within the barony of Lurg, County Fermanagh, Northern Ireland

Below is a list of civil parishes in Lurg:

- Belleek
- Derryvullan (also partly in barony of Tirkennedy)
- Drumkeeran
- Magheraculmoney
- Templecarn
- Trory (also partly in barony of Tirkennedy)
