= Sidaire =

Administrative area in County Fermanagh, Northern Ireland

Coordinates: 54.22527°N 7.3709°W

Sidaire: Irish: Suí Dachair
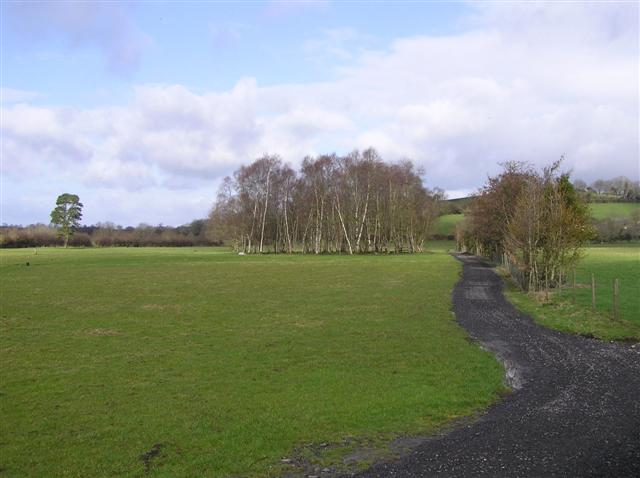

- Location within Northern Ireland
- District: Fermanagh and Omagh
- County: County Fermanagh
- Country: Northern Ireland
- Sovereign state: United Kingdom
- Postcode district: BT
- Dialling code: 028
- Police: Northern Ireland
- Fire: Northern Ireland
- Ambulance: Northern Ireland
- UK Parliament: Fermanagh and South Tyrone
- NI Assembly: Fermanagh and South Tyrone

Sidaire (Irish: Suí Dachair) is a townland in the civil parish of Magheracross in County Fermanagh, Northern Ireland. It is located in the historical barony of Tirkennedy.

Sidaire is 327.37 acres in area, and is bounded by the Ballinamallard River to the south, the town of Ballinamallard to the east and the Enniskillen Road to the west.

== Gallery ==
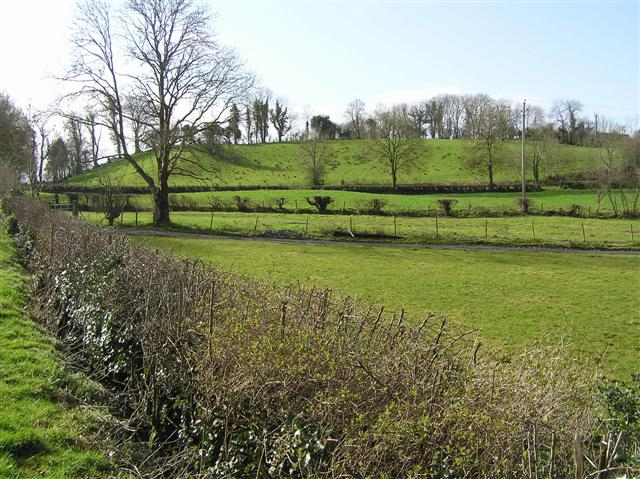
Fields in Sidaire

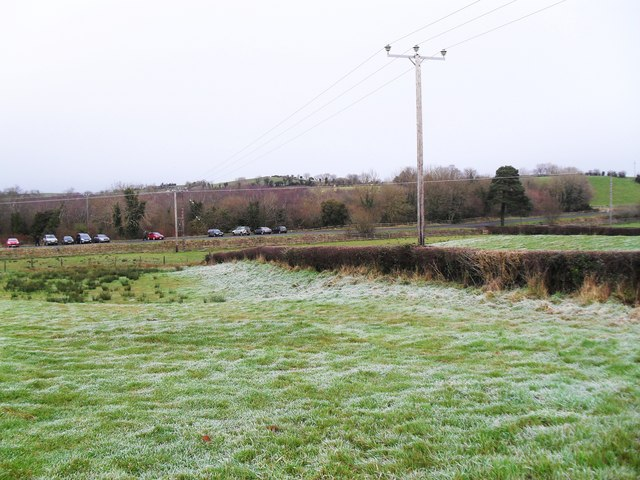
Sidaire townland

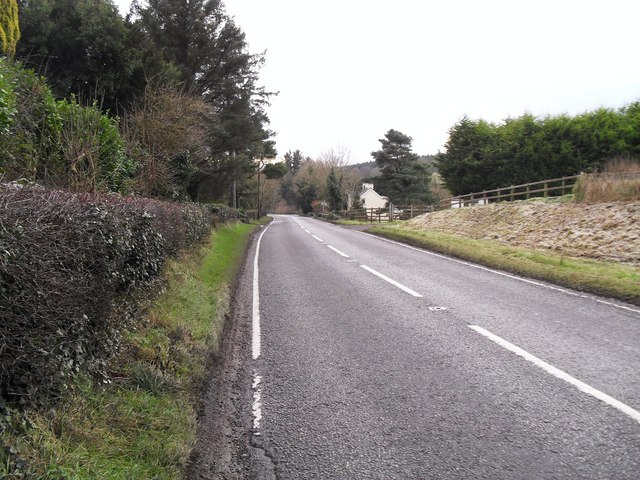
Road in the area
