= Drummurry =

Coordinates: 54.259°N 7.36°W

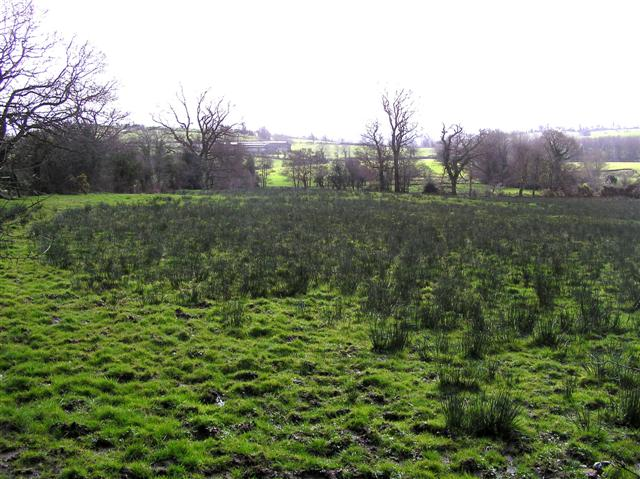

- Location within Northern Ireland
- District: Fermanagh and Omagh
- County: County Fermanagh
- Country: Northern Ireland
- Sovereign state: United Kingdom
- Postcode district: BT
- Dialling code: 028
- Police: Northern Ireland
- Fire: Northern Ireland
- Ambulance: Northern Ireland
- UK Parliament: Fermanagh and South Tyrone
- NI Assembly: Fermanagh and South Tyrone

Drummurry (or Drummuray) is a townland in Magheracross civil parish, County Fermanagh, Northern Ireland. The topography is undulating and slightly marshy. Land use is predominantly agricultural but includes newer urban development on the outskirts of Ballinamallard township.
