= Coa, Northern Ireland =

Coordinates: 54.405112°N 7.562946°W

Coa
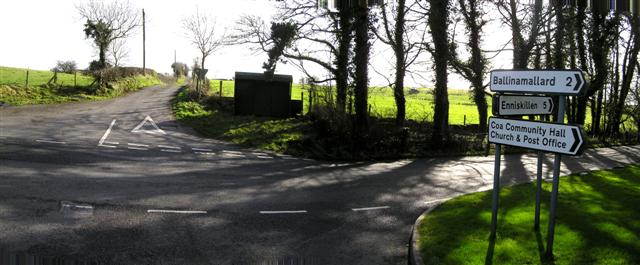
- Junction of Coa Road and Coa Chapel Road

- Location within Northern Ireland
- District: Fermanagh and Omagh
- County: County Fermanagh
- Country: Northern Ireland
- Sovereign state: United Kingdom
- Postcode district: BT
- Dialling code: 028
- Police: Northern Ireland
- Fire: Northern Ireland
- Ambulance: Northern Ireland
- UK Parliament: Fermanagh and South Tyrone
- NI Assembly: Fermanagh and South Tyrone

Coa is a townland and hamlet in Magheracross civil parish, County Fermanagh, Northern Ireland. It is located east of the town of Ballinamallard and is 399.11 acres in area. Landmarks include St Mary's Church Coa, Cavanalough Glebe, and Killee Lough.

== History ==
About 450 AD, the parish was said to have been founded by St Patrick and about 550 AD, St Columba passed through the area. In 1769, John Wesley visited the district bringing Methodism and Coa Chapel was built in 1770. In the early 20th century, further religious movements swept the district.

== Sport ==
The area has a Gaelic football club, Coa O'Dwyers (CLG Uí Dhuibhir, An Cuach).

It is the birthplace of Ipswich Town manager Kieran McKenna.
