= SLNCR Lough class =

Class of two-cylinder 0-6-4T locomotives

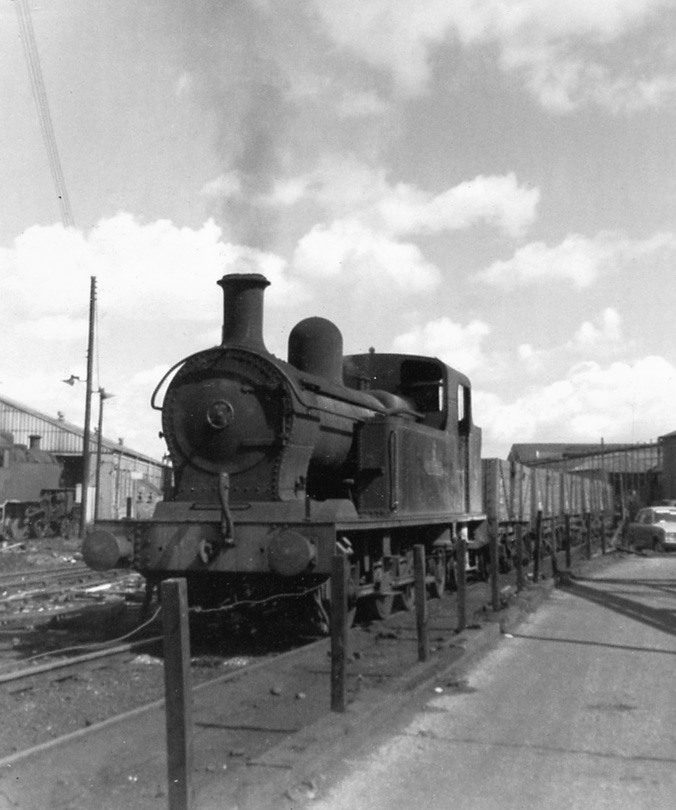
- 27 Lough Erne near Belfast York Road in 1968.
Type and origin
- Power type: Steam
- Builder: Beyer, Peacock & Company
- Serial number: 7138, 7242
- Build date: 1949
- Total produced: 2
Specifications
- Configuration
  - Whyte: 0-6-4T
  - UIC: C2′ t
- Gauge: 5 ft 3 in (1,600 mm)
- Driver dia.: 4 ft 8 in (1.422 m)
- Trailing dia.: 3 ft 0 in (0.914 m)
- Wheelbase: 24 ft 7 in (7.49 m)
- Loco weight: 54.5 long tons (55.4 t; 61.0 short tons)
- Fuel type: Coal
- Fuel capacity: 2 long tons (2.0 t; 2.2 short tons)
- Water cap.: 1,300 imp gal (5,900 L; 1,600 US gal)
- Firebox
  - Grate area: 18 sq ft (1.7 m^{2})
- Boiler pressure: 160 psi (1.10 MPa)
- Heating surface
  - Firebox: 97 sq ft (9.0 m^{2})
  - Tubes: 865 sq ft (80.4 m^{2})
  - Total surface: 962 sq ft (89.4 m^{2})
- Cylinders: Two
- Cylinder size: 18 in × 24 in (457 mm × 610 mm)
- Train heating: Steam
- Loco brake: Steam
Career
- Operators: Sligo, Leitrim and Northern Counties Railway; Ulster Transport Authority
- Class: SLNCR: Lough; UTA: Z
- Numbers: SLNCR: none; UTA: 26, 27
- Official name: Lough Melvin; Lough Erne
- Delivered: 1951
- Withdrawn: 1965, 1969
- Current owner: Railway Preservation Society of Ireland
- Disposition: 1 preserved, 1 scrapped

The SLNCR Lough Class was a class of 0-6-4T steam tank locomotives of the Sligo, Leitrim and Northern Counties Railway (SLNCR).

== Development ==
By the end of World War II the SLNCR's locomotive fleet was in poor condition, but neither the Great Northern nor Córas Iompair Éireann could spare any suitable locomotives for hire. The SLNCR considered ordering a Garratt locomotive to haul heavier trains, but it could scarcely afford one locomotive of such a large size. Therefore, it decided instead to order two more smaller locomotives, on the basis that if one required maintenance the other could still be available for traffic.

In June 1946 the SLNCR ordered just one new locomotive from Beyer, Peacock & Company at Gorton Foundry, Manchester, England. The SLNCR's financial situation was worsening, but despite this it ordered the second locomotive about a year later. The Lough class was a more modern and more powerful development of the Sir Henry class, which was also built by Beyer, Peacock & Company but was introduced in 1904.

== Delivery and SLNCR service ==
Beyer, Peacock & Company completed both locomotives ready for delivery in spring 1949 but by then the SLNCR could not afford to pay for them. The SLNCR therefore asked the Government of Northern Ireland's Ministry of Commerce to lend it £22,000 to pay for the two locomotives. Protracted negotiations between the SLNCR, Ministry of Commerce and Beyer, Peacock eventually resulted in a hire purchase agreement in 1951, and the two locomotives were shipped from England to Belfast in June and July of that year. They were taken first to the GNR's Adelaide locomotive depot in Belfast, where their side tanks were fitted. They were then delivered to the SLNCR's locomotive depot at Manorhamilton, County Leitrim.

The Lough class became the last new steam locomotives to enter revenue-earning service with an Irish railway company. CIÉ's turf-burning locomotive entered traffic later, but remained experimental and never entered revenue-earning service. The Loughs could haul trains 25% heavier than the Sir Henrys, and they were worked hard from 1951 until the SLNCR's closure.

The SLNCR had never prospered, and in 1957 it closed to all traffic. On Monday 30 September 1957 Lough Melvin hauled the company's last service, a mixed train from Eniskillen to Sligo.

== SLNCR livery ==
By the 1950s the SLNCR's locomotive livery was unlined black. Brasswork was also painted black but the borders and lettering of the locomotive nameplates were picked out in red. Coupling rods and buffer beams were also painted red.

== Identification ==
The SLNCR did not number its steam locomotives but named them. The Lough Class were named Lough Melvin and Lough Erne.

Name	Builders	Works No.	Date	UTA No.	Withdrawn
Lough Melvin	Beyer, Peacock & Company	7138 ^{(a)}	1949	26	1965
Lough Erne	Beyer, Peacock & Company	7242 ^{(b)}	1949	27	1969

(a) : Beyer, Peacock & Company works numbers 7136/7/8 were originally allocated to three War Department Garratt locomotives. This order was cancelled, 7136 and 7137 were re-allocated to two extra Garratts for the Great Western Railway of Brazil, added to a delayed pre-war order sub-contracted to Henschel & Son.

(b) : The last tank locomotive built by Beyer Peacock & Company, order No.1427.

== Sale and UTA service ==
When the SLNCR closed at the end of September 1957 the Loughs were still on hire purchase from their builders. Beyer, Peacock eventually sold the pair in 1959 to the Ulster Transport Authority (UTA).

The UTA designated the Loughs Class Z and numbered them 26 and 27, but they continued to carry their names and nameplates. For a short while the UTA allocated both locomotives to Adelaide shed for service as shunters on the quays and Grosvenor Road goods yard. It then transferred them to York Road, where they eventually replaced NCC Class Y.

On 28 May 1960, locomotive 26 Lough Melvin hauled a two-coach Irish Railway Record Society special train from Belfast York Road to Antrim, Lisburn and via the former Belfast Central Railway to Belfast Queen's Quay, the tour eventually terminating at Great Victoria Street. This was recorded as the first passenger working of an ex-SLNCR locomotive in the ownership of the UTA.

The UTA withdrew 26 Lough Melvin from service in 1965 but did not dispose of it. Northern Ireland Railways (NIR) took over the UTA's railway operations in 1967 and sold Lough Melvin for scrap in 1968. NIR withdrew 27 Lough Erne in 1969.

== Preservation ==
The Railway Preservation Society of Ireland bought Lough Erne and used it to shunt its yard at Whitehead until its boiler failed in 1972. Lough Erne remains at Whitehead awaiting extensive restoration.

== Sources ==
- Various copies of Modern Railways from the 1970s.
- Sprinks, N.W. (1970). Sligo, Leitrim and Northern Counties Railway. Billericay: Irish Railway Record Society (London Area).
