= Newtownbutler railway station =

Former railway station in Northern Ireland

Newtownbutler
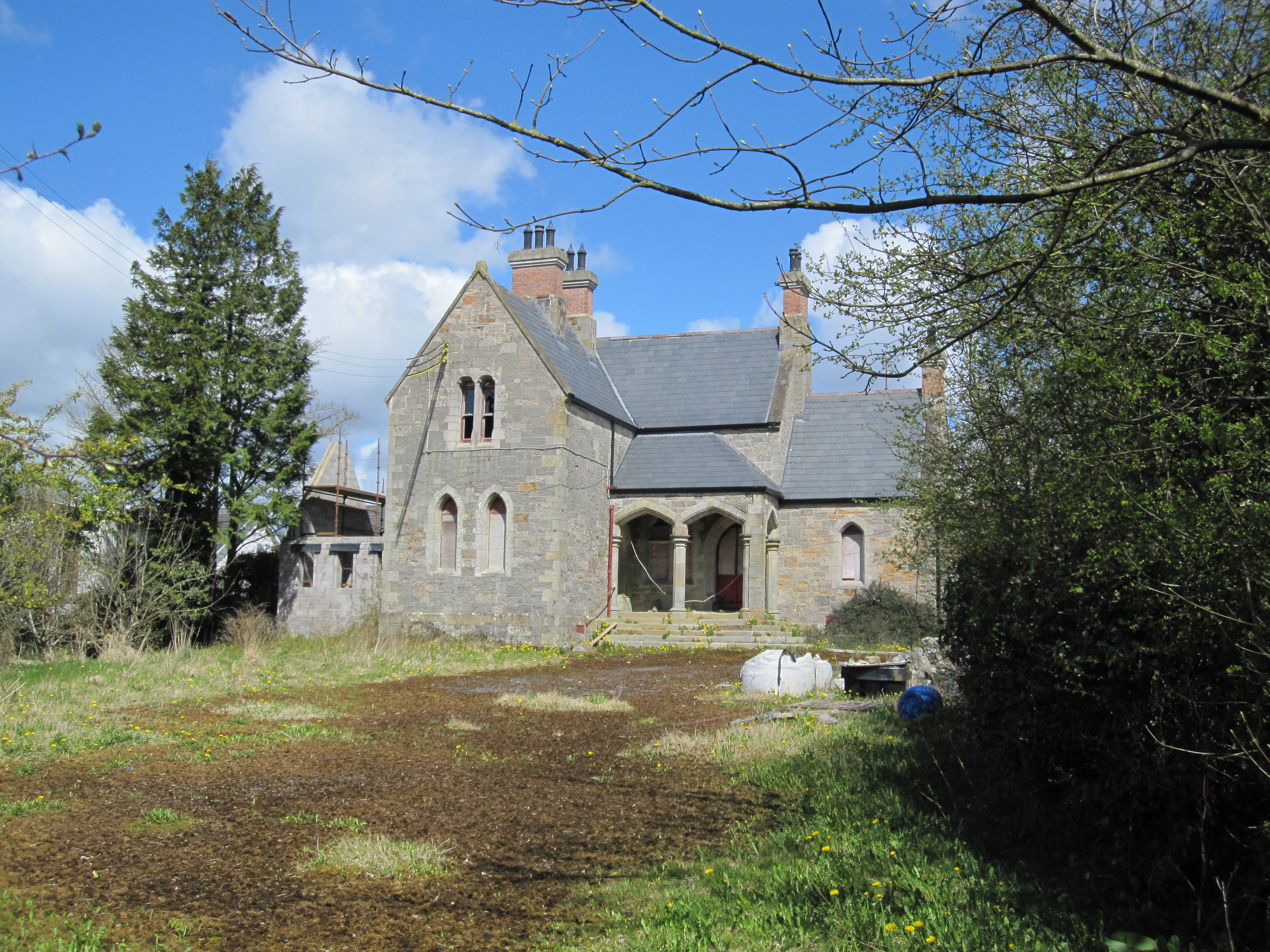
- Station building (2013)

General information
- Location: Newtownbutler, County Fermanagh, Northern Ireland; UK
- Coordinates: 54.183622°N 7.356766°W

History
- Original company: Dundalk and Enniskillen Railway
- Post-grouping: Great Northern Railway (Ireland)

Key dates
- 26 June 1858: Station opens
- 1 October 1957: Station closes
Location

Newtownbutler railway station was on the Dundalk and Enniskillen Railway in Northern Ireland.

The Dundalk and Enniskillen Railway opened the station on 26 June 1858.

It closed on 1 October 1957.

== Routes ==
Preceding station	Disused railways	Following station
Clones	Dundalk and Enniskillen Railway; Dundalk to Enniskillen	Lisnaskea
