= Magheracross =

Townland in County Fermanagh, Northern Ireland

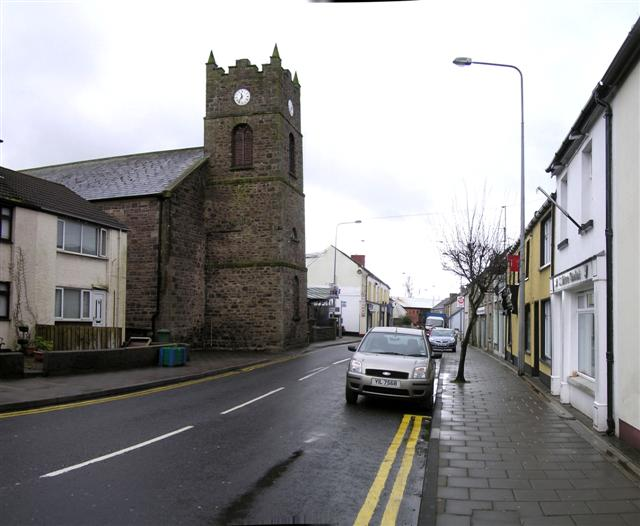
Magheracross Church of Ireland church, in Ballinamallard, is in the Diocese of Clogher

Magheracross is a townland and civil parish in County Fermanagh, Northern Ireland. It extends in area from just north of Enniskillen to the border with County Tyrone and includes a small enclave in County Tyrone. The main town in the parish is Ballinamallard.

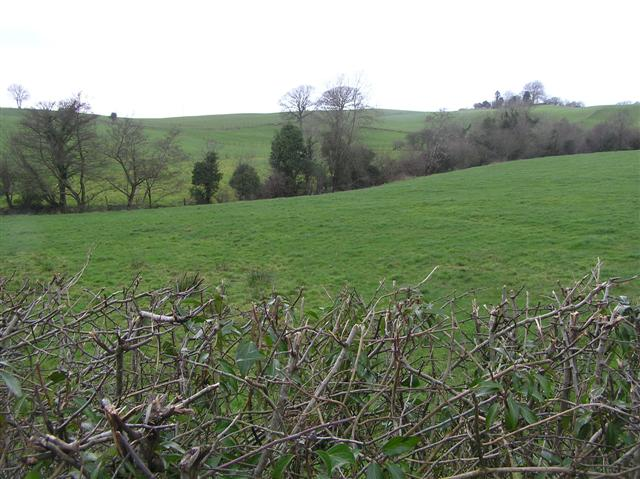
Magheracross townland shares its name with the civil parish

Ballinamallard railway station operated from August 1854 to October 1957.

By 1910 the population was recorded at 283.

== Religion ==
About 450AD, the local parish was said to have been founded by St Patrick and about 550AD St Columba passed through the area. In the 7th century, Laisrén mac Nad Froích founded a community on nearby Devenish Island. Another monastery was built in the Middle Ages in the parish, and other establishments built at nearby Trory. In 1769 John Wesley visited the district bringing Methodism and nearby Coa Chapel was built in 1770.

In the early 20th century, further religious movements swept the district.

== Landmarks ==
Landmarks in the parish include:

- Ballinamallard Church of Ireland church, built in 1770
- Ballinamallard Weslyn Meeting house
- St Mary's Catholic church, built 1770
- An Iron Age henge and ring fort

== Townlands ==
Townlands in Magheracross civil parish include:

- Ballinamallard, main town of the parish
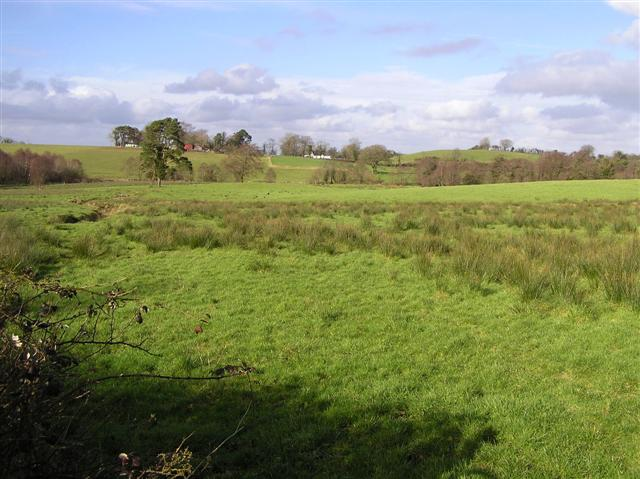
- Cavanalough Glebe
  Cavanalough Glebe is a locality and townland in Magheracross, located at 54° 24' 19" N, 7° 33' 20" W in the Barony of Tirkennedy. The townland is 398.88 acres in area.
- Coa townland.
- Cooltrain townland is in the civil parish. It is located at 54° 23' 20" N, 7° 33' 46" W. and is 159.89 acres in area.
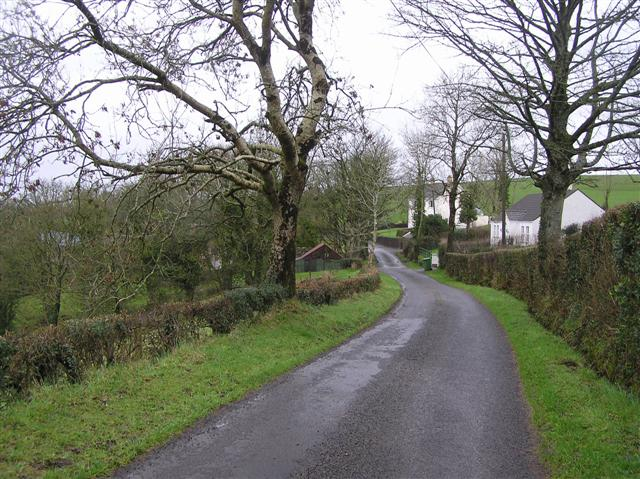
- Currin
  Currin is located at 54° 24' 7" N, 7° 35' 17" W. It is 327.46 acres in area.
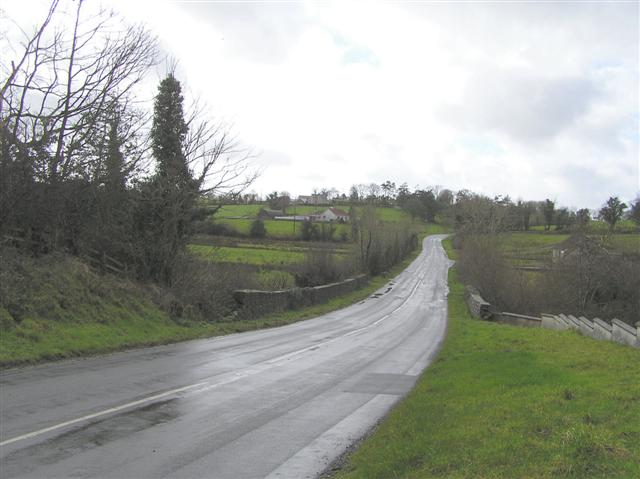
- Drumcreen
  Drumcreen is also in Magheracross, located at 54° 25' 28" N, 7° 34' 38" W. Drumcreen is 123.37 acres in area.
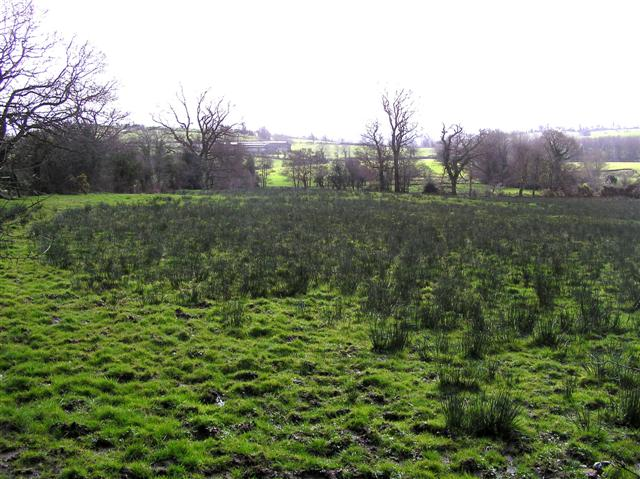
- Drummuray
  Drummurry is townland also in Magheracross. The topography is undulating and slightly marshy. and land use is predominantly agricultural but includes newer urban development on the outskirts of Ballinamallard township. It is located at 54° 25' 9" N, 7° 36' 14" W. and is 165.91 acres in area.
- Drumsloe is located at 54° 24′ 30.39″ N, 7° 34′ 17.41″ W in Magheracross parish. Drumsloe is 240.77 acres in area. It has been known as early as 1609AD when it was known as Dromslo, a name that may be from Druim Sluagh meaning ridge of the hosts. The Griffith's Valuation of 1863 indicates a school was located in Drumsloe. Significant landmarks include Drumsloe lough, where illegal distillery on Drumsloe Island was operated for some time in the early 19th century.
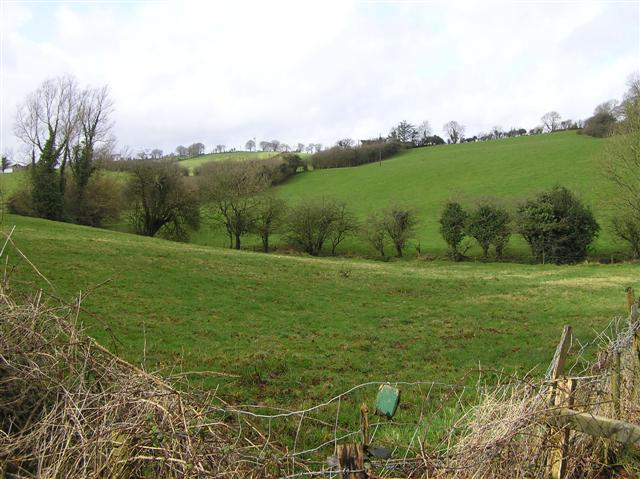
- Salloon townland
  Salloon, also in Magheracross is located at 54° 25' 49" N, 7° 35' 35" W and is 222.08 acres in area. A large townland, Salloon takes in areas of rural farmland but also includes about a third of Ballinamallard.
- Salary is a townland located at 54° 24' 53" N, 7° 36' 47" W. It is 212.98 acres in area.
- Sidaire townland is located at 54° 25' 27" N, 7° 37' 9" W.

== See also ==
- List of civil parishes of County Fermanagh
- List of civil parishes of County Tyrone
