= Rockcorry railway station =

Former railway station in Ireland

Rockcorry

General information
- Location: Rockcorry, County Monaghan; Ireland
- Coordinates: 54.1084°N 6.9979°W

History
- Original company: Dundalk and Enniskillen Railway
- Post-grouping: Great Northern Railway (Ireland)

Key dates
- 10 October 1860: Station opens
- 10 March 1947: Station closes to passengers and goods
- 20 June 1955: Station closes completely
Location

Rockcorry Railway Station was on the Cootehill Branch of the Dundalk and Enniskillen Railway in the Republic of Ireland.

== History ==
The Dundalk and Enniskillen Railway opened the station on 10 October 1860.

The branch was closed to passenger traffic on 10 March 1947, but it remained open for light goods until 20 June 1955.

== Routes ==
Preceding station	Disused railways	Following station
Ballybay	Dundalk and Enniskillen Railway; Cootehill branch line	Cootehill
