= Lisnaskea railway station =

Railway station in Northern Ireland

Lisnaskea

General information
- Location: Lisnaskea, County Fermanagh, Northern Ireland; UK
- Coordinates: 54.258888°N 7.452491°W

History
- Original company: Dundalk and Enniskillen Railway
- Post-grouping: Great Northern Railway (Ireland)

Key dates
- 26 August 1858: Station opens
- 1 October 1957: Station closes
Location

Lisnaskea railway station was on the Dundalk and Enniskillen Railway in Northern Ireland.

The Dundalk and Enniskillen Railway opened the station on 26 August 1858.

It closed on 1 October 1957.

== Routes ==
Preceding station	Disused railways	Following station
Newtownbutler	Dundalk and Enniskillen Railway; Dundalk to Enniskillen	Maguiresbridge
