= Drumsloe =

Coordinates: 54.25°N 7.34°W

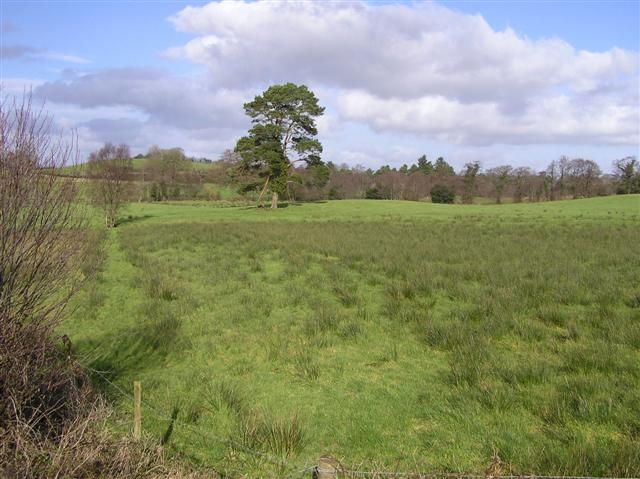

- Location within Northern Ireland
- District: Fermanagh and Omagh
- County: County Fermanagh
- Country: Northern Ireland
- Sovereign state: United Kingdom
- Postcode district: BT94 2.
- Dialling code: 028
- Police: Northern Ireland
- Fire: Northern Ireland
- Ambulance: Northern Ireland
- UK Parliament: Fermanagh and South Tyrone
- NI Assembly: Fermanagh and South Tyrone

Drumsloe is a locality and townland in the Barony of Tirkennedy in Northern Ireland, just east of Ballinamallard township in Magheracross. Drumsloe is 240.77 acres in area.

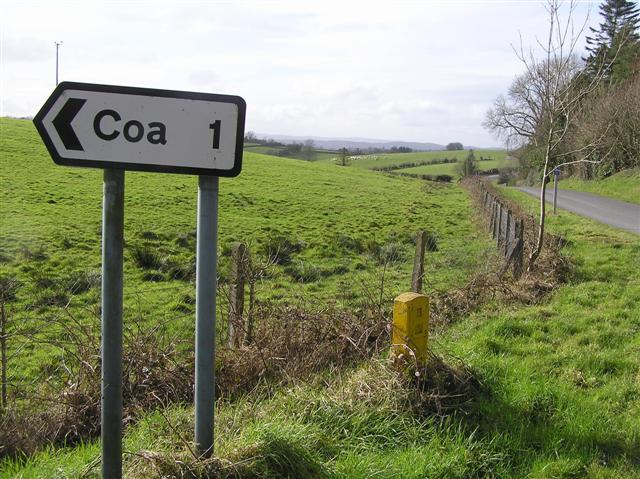
Drumsloe

== History ==
Drumsloe is known as early as 1609 AD when it was known as Dromslo, a name that may be from Druim Sluagh meaning ridge of the hosts. The Griffith's Valuation of 1863 indicates a school was located in Drumsloe. Significant landmarks include drumsloe lough, where illegal distillery on Drumsloe Island was operated for some time in the early 19th century.
