= Maguiresbridge railway station =

Railway station in County Fermanagh, Northern Ireland

Maguiresbridge

General information
- Location: Maguiresbridge, County Fermanagh, Northern Ireland; UK
- Coordinates: 54.293380°N 7.471892°W

History
- Original company: Dundalk and Enniskillen Railway
- Post-grouping: Great Northern Railway (Ireland)

Key dates
- 1 March 1859: Station opens
- 1 October 1957: Station closes
Location

Maguiresbridge railway station was on the Dundalk and Enniskillen Railway in Northern Ireland.

The Dundalk and Enniskillen Railway opened the station on 1 March 1859.

It closed on 1 October 1957.

== Routes ==
Preceding station	Disused railways	Following station
Lisnaskea	Dundalk and Enniskillen Railway; Dundalk to Enniskillen	Lisbellaw
Maguiresbridge Town	Clogher Valley Railway; Tynan to Maguiresbridge	Terminus
