= Cootehill railway station =

Railway station in County Cavan, Ireland

Coordinates: 54.0715°N 7.0680°W

Cootehill
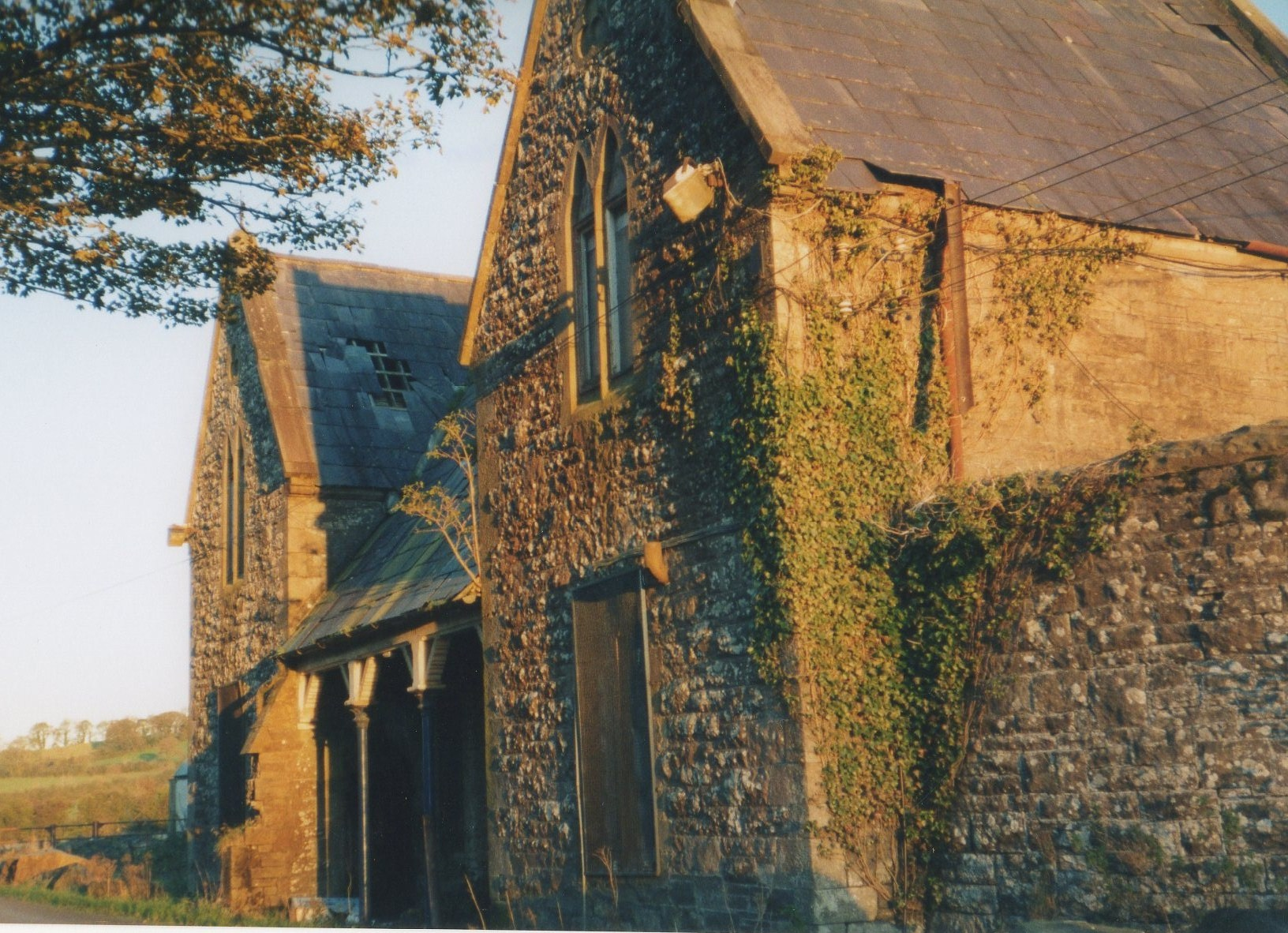
- Cootehill railway station viewed from the public road, 2006

General information
- Location: Cootehill, County Cavan; Ireland

History
- Original company: Dundalk and Enniskillen Railway
- Post-grouping: Great Northern Railway (Ireland)

Key dates
- 10 October 1860: Station opens
- 10 March 1947: Station closes to passengers and goods
- 20 June 1955: Station closes completely
Location
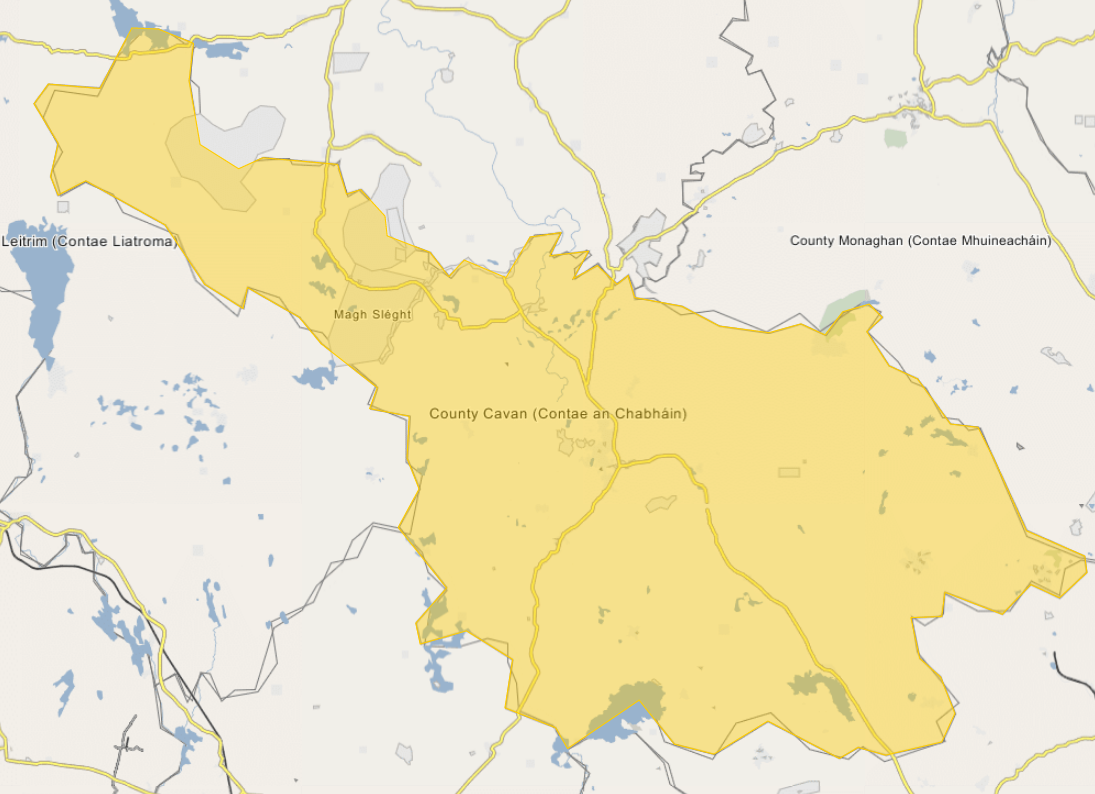
- Location within County Cavan Location within Ireland

Cootehill Railway Station was on the Dundalk and Enniskillen Railway in the Republic of Ireland. It served the village of Cootehill in County Cavan.

The Dundalk and Enniskillen Railway opened the station on 10 October 1860.

The branch was closed to passenger traffic on 10 March 1947, but it remained open for light goods until 20 June 1955.

The old station and associated buildings now form Cootehill Livestock Mart.

== Routes ==
Preceding station	Disused railways	Following station
Rockcorry	Dundalk and Enniskillen Railway; Ballybay to Cootehill	Terminus
