= Enniskillen railway station =

Train station in Enniskillen, Northern Ireland

Enniskillen
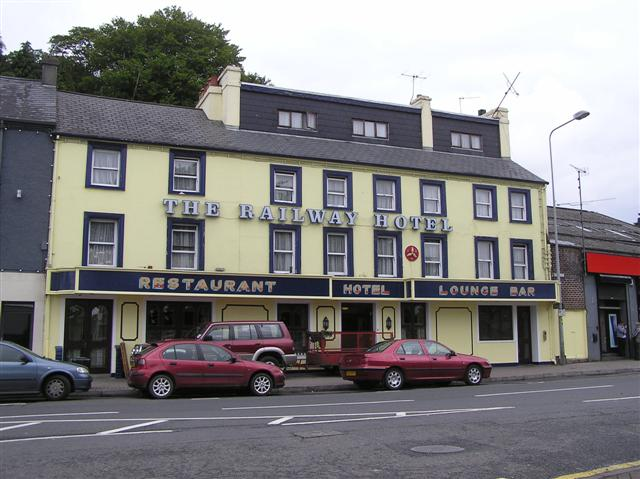
- The Railway Hotel, Enniskillen

General information
- Location: Enniskillen, County Fermanagh; Northern Ireland; UK
- Coordinates: 54.345022°N 7.627562°W
- Elevation: 181 ft (55 m)

History
- Original company: Londonderry and Enniskillen Railway
- Post-grouping: Great Northern Railway (Ireland)

Key dates
- 19 August 1854: LER station opens
- 15 February 1859: New DE station opens
- 1 June 1860: LER relocates to DE station
- 18 March 1879: Temporary SLNCR station opens
- January 1883: SLNCR start to share facilities at the station
- 1 October 1957: Station closes
Location
- Location within Northern Ireland

Enniskillen railway station served Enniskillen in County Fermanagh, Northern Ireland.

== History ==
The Londonderry and Enniskillen Railway opened the first station in the town on 19 August 1854.

The Dundalk and Enniskillen Railway opened a station slightly further south in Enniskillen on 15 February 1859; on 1 June 1860, the Londonderry and Enniskillen Railway moved so as to share the facilities at this station.

That station was taken over by the Great Northern Railway in 1876.

On 18 March 1879 the Sligo, Leitrim and Northern Counties Railway opened a temporary station in Enniskillen. In January 1883 the temporary station was closed, when the Sligo, Leitrim and Northern Counties Railway agreed to share facilities at the Dundalk and Enniskillen Railway station.

The lines to Enniskillen were closed on 1 October 1957 when the Northern Ireland Board made the GNRI close most of its cross-border lines to save money.

== Routes ==
Preceding station	Disused railways	Following station
Gortaloughan Halt	Great Northern Railway (Ireland); Londonderry to Enniskillen	Terminus
Lisbellaw	Great Northern Railway (Ireland); Dundalk to Enniskillen	Terminus
Mullaghy	Sligo, Leitrim and Northern Counties Railway; Sligo to Enniskillen	Terminus
