= Ballinamallard River =

River in Northern Ireland

The Ballinamallard River is a river in Northern Ireland. It flows through the town Ballinamallard after which it was named.

== History ==
In 1812 a canal was proposed to link the river with Strabane, but this was never built. In 1904 it was the site of revival movement baptisms. The river is subject to a fisheries management scheme ensuring good catches of trout and salmon.

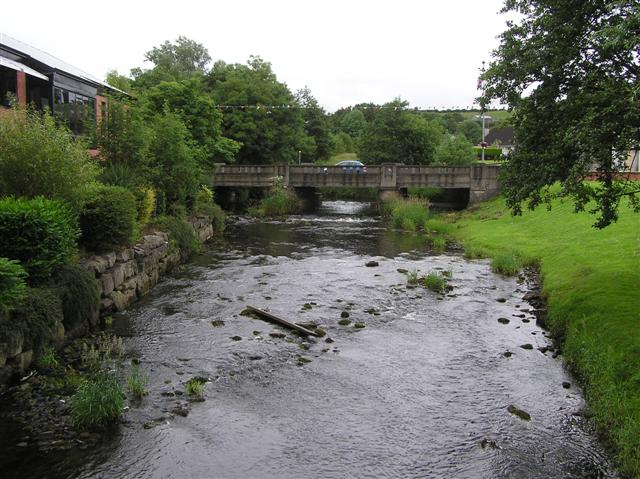

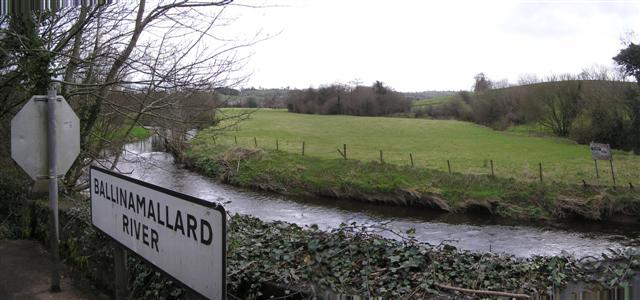

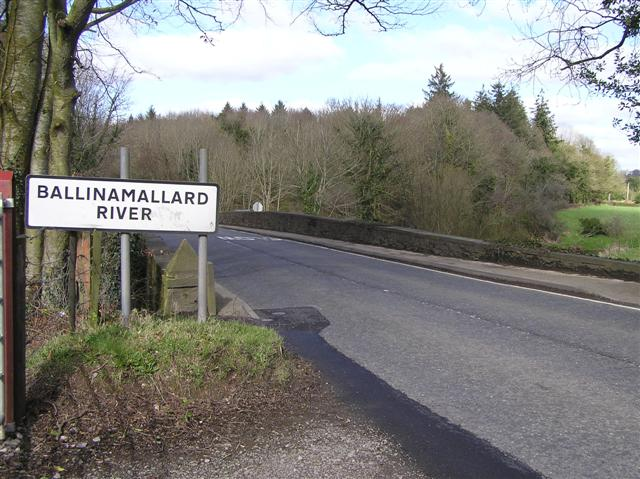

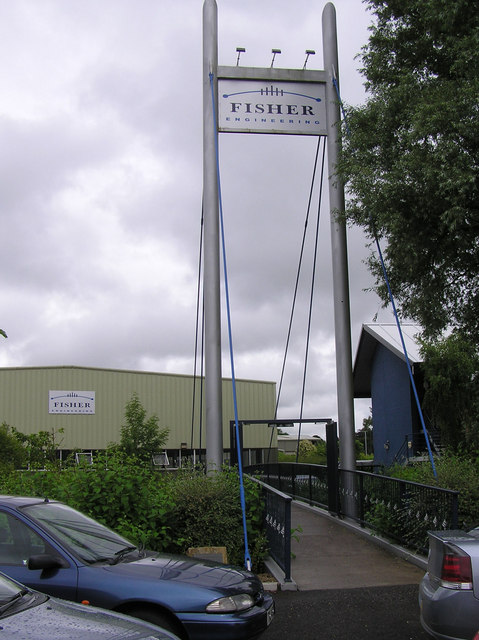
