= LMS Fowler Class 3F =

Class steam locomotives

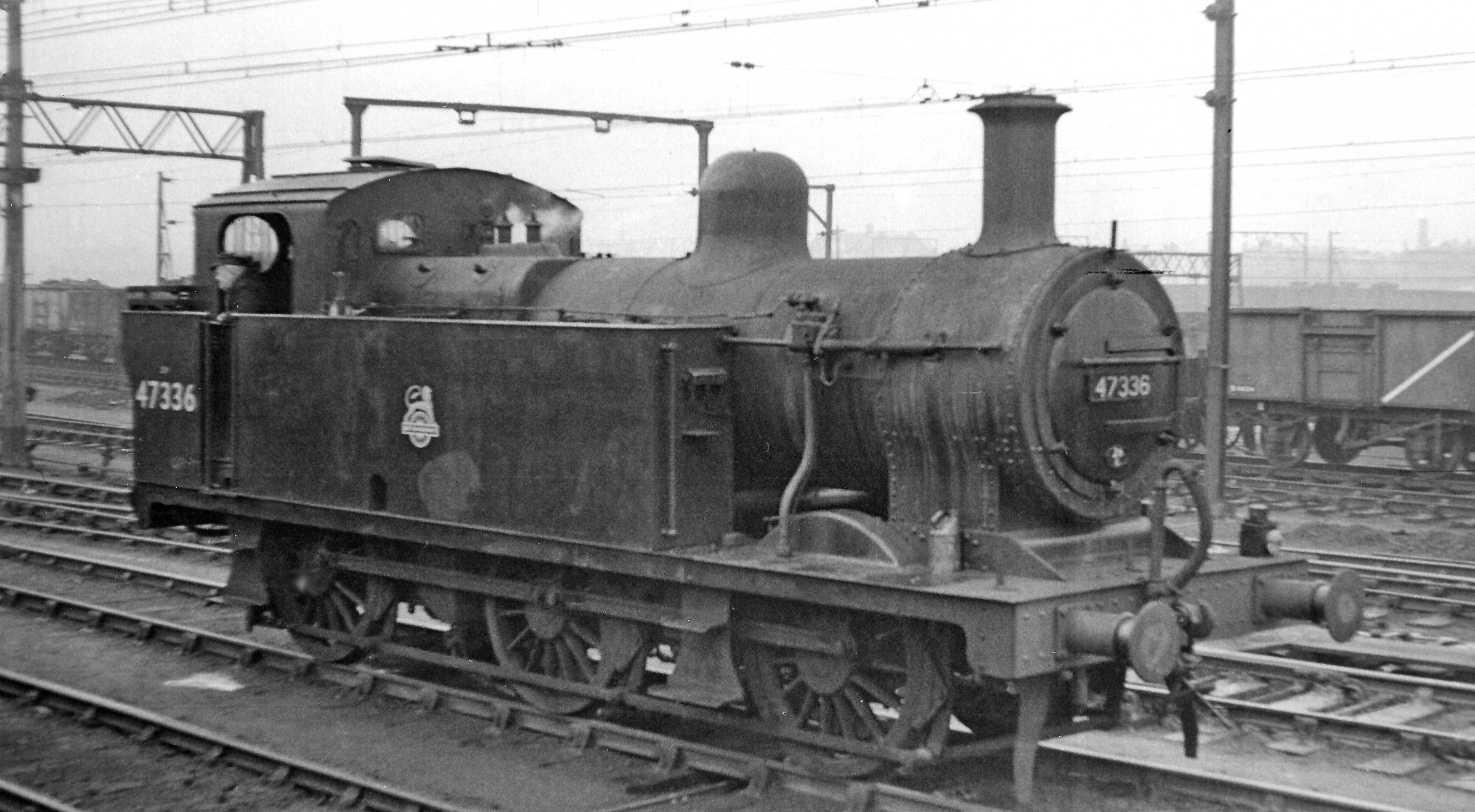
- 47336 at Ancoats, 1955
Type and origin
- Power type: Steam
- Designer: Henry Fowler
- Builder: W. G. Bagnall (32); Wm. Beardmore & Co. (90); Hunslet Engine Co. (90); LMS Horwich Works (15); North British Locomotive Co. (75); Vulcan Foundry (120)
- Build date: 1924–1931
- Total produced: 422
Specifications
- Configuration
  - Whyte: 0-6-0T
  - UIC: C n2t
- Gauge: 4 ft 8 1/2 in (1,435 mm) standard gauge
- Driver dia.: 4 ft 7 in (1.397 m)
- Wheelbase: 16 ft 6 in (5.03 m)
- Length: 31 ft 4 3/4 in (9.57 m)
- Loco weight: 49.5 long tons (50.3 t; 55.4 short tons)
- Fuel type: Coal
- Fuel capacity: 2.25 long tons (2.29 t; 2.52 short tons)
- Water cap.: 1,200 imp gal (5,500 L; 1,400 US gal)
- Firebox
  - Grate area: 16 sq ft (1.5 m^{2})
- Boiler: LMS type G5 1/2
- Boiler pressure: 160 lbf/in^{2} (1.10 MPa)
- Heating surface
  - Firebox: 97 sq ft (9.0 m^{2})
  - Tubes: 967 sq ft (89.8 m^{2})
- Superheater: None
- Cylinders: Two, inside
- Cylinder size: 18 in × 26 in (457 mm × 660 mm)
- Valve gear: Stephenson link motion, slide valves
Performance figures
- Tractive effort: 20,835 lbf (92.68 kN)
Career
- Operators: London, Midland and Scottish Railway; Somerset and Dorset Joint Railway; War Department; SNCF; British Railways; NCB
- Power class: 3F
- Nicknames: Jinty
- Axle load class: BR: Route Availability 5
- Locale: London Midland Region
- Withdrawn: 1945 (2), 1948 (5), 1959–1967
- Disposition: 9 preserved, remainder scrapped

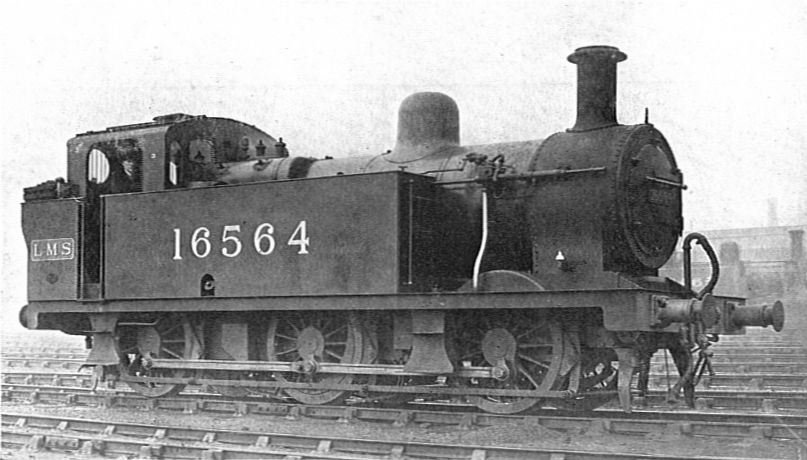
16564, newly built in 1928

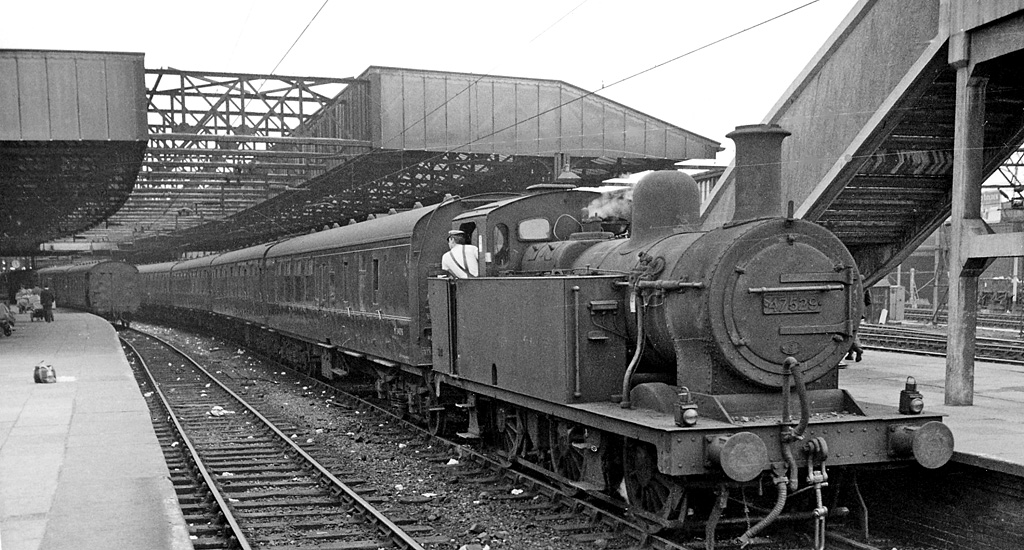
47529 at Crewe

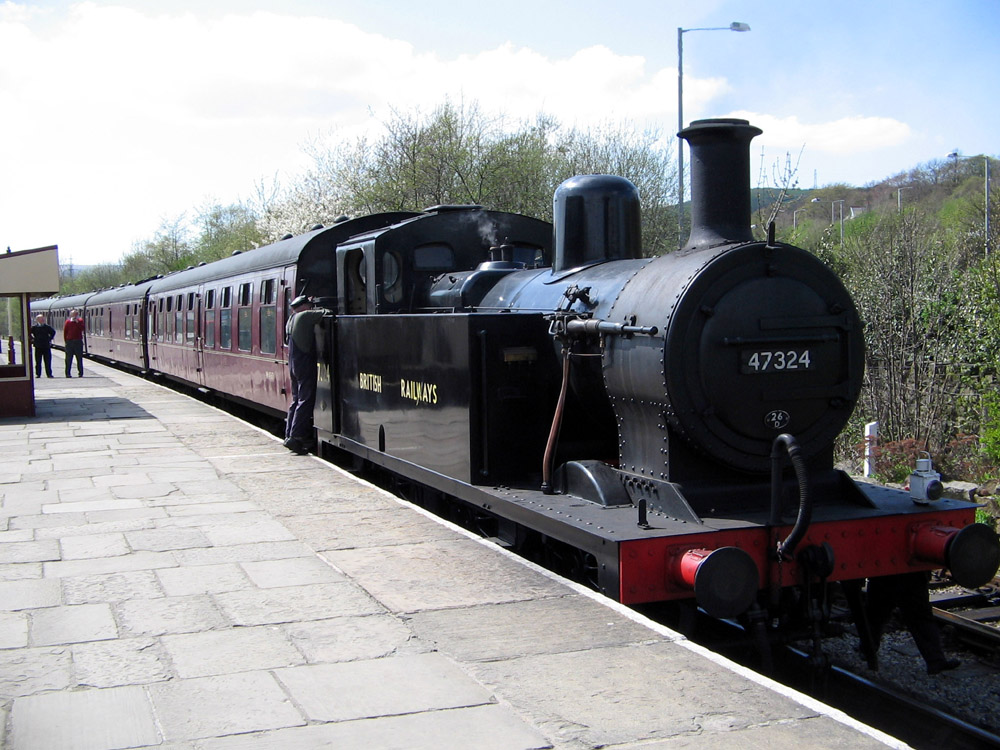
Preserved No. 47324 on the East Lancashire Railway

The London, Midland and Scottish Railway (LMS) Fowler 3F 0-6-0T is a class of steam locomotives, often known as Jinty. They represent the ultimate development of the Midland Railway's six-coupled tank engines. They could reach speeds of up to 60 mph (97 km/h).

== Introduction ==
Design of this class was based on rebuilds by Henry Fowler of the Midland Railway 2441 Class introduced in 1899 by Samuel Waite Johnson. These rebuilds featured a Belpaire firebox and improved cab. 422 Jinties were built between 1924 and 1931; this class was just one of the Midland designs used on an ongoing basis by the LMS. The locomotives were built by the ex-L&YR Horwich Works and the private firms Bagnall's, Beardmores, Hunslet, North British and the Vulcan Foundry.

== Details ==
Numbers		Lot No.	Date built	Built by	Notes
Original	1934	Lot No.	Date built	Built by	Notes
7100–7119	7260–7279	12	1924	Vulcan Foundry 3717–3736	
7120–7134	7280–7294	13	1924	North British 23121–23135	
7135–7141	7295–7301	14	1924	Hunslet 1460–1466	
7142–7149	7302–7309	14	1925	Hunslet 1467–1474	
7150–7156	7310–7316	—	1929	W. G. Bagnall 2358–2364	Né SDJR 19–25
16400–16459	7317–7376	34	1926	North British 23396–23455	
16460–16509	7377–7426	35	1926	Vulcan Foundry 3948–3997	
16510–16518	7427–7435	36	1926	Hunslet 1511–1519	
16519–16534	7436–7451	36	1927	Hunslet 1520–1535	
16535–16543	7452–7460	37	1926	W. G. Bagnall 2288–2296	
16544–16549	7461–7466	37	1926	W. G. Bagnall 2297–2302	
16550–16554	7467–7471	50	1928	Vulcan Foundry 4175–4179	
16555–16560	7472–7477	50	1927	Vulcan Foundry 4169–4174	
16561–16599	7478–7516	50	1928	Vulcan Foundry 4180–4218	
16600–16624	7517–7541	51	1928	Beardmore 325–349	
16625–16632	7542–7549	52	1927	Hunslet 1558–1565	
16633–16649	7550–7566	52	1928	Hunslet 1566–78/82/80/81/79	
16650–16669	7567–7586	58	1928	Hunslet 1591–1610	
16670–16674	7587–7591	58	1929	Hunslet 1611–1615	
16675–16684	7592–7601	59	1928	W. G. Bagnall 2343–2352	
16685–16723	7602–7640	60	1928	Beardmore 350–388	
16724–16749	7641–7666	60	1929	Beardmore 389–414	
16750–16764	7667–7681	82	1931	LMS Horwich Works	

When new, they were numbered 7100–7149, 16400–16764. Numbers 7150–7156 were added when the LMS absorbed the Somerset and Dorset Joint Railway locomotives in 1930. In the 1934 LMS renumbering scheme, the locomotives were assigned the series 7260–7681. On the outbreak of the Second World War in 1939 they were initially chosen as the standard shunting locomotive for the War Department, but later the more modern Hunslet "Austerity" 0-6-0ST was chosen in preference. Nevertheless, eight were dispatched to France before its fall in 1940, and only five returned in 1948. Two, 7456 and 7553, were converted to the 5 ft 3 in (1,600 mm) Irish broad gauge in 1944 and 1945 for use on Northern Counties Committee lines in Northern Ireland, becoming the NCC Class Y, and numbered 18 and 19. A total of 412 thus entered British Railways stock in 1948, rising to 417 by the end of the year.

Numbers 16560-16564 were fitted for push-pull train working with the regulator controlled by vacuum.

British Railways numbers were the 1934 LMS numbers prefixed with '4'.

== In service ==
The 3Fs were built primarily for shunting and short-distance freight but saw use on a wide variety of duties. These included hauling passenger trains at locations such as north London, Liverpool, Manchester, and South Wales (the last using the engines fitted for push-pull working), as well as banking other trains, most notably on the 1 in 37.7 Lickey Incline where up to four 3Fs were used at once.

== Withdrawal ==
The first withdrawals started in 1959 and by 1964 half had been withdrawn. The final five survived until 1967, with a further one, 47445 continuing with the National Coal Board.

Table of withdrawals
Year	Quantity in service at start of year	Quantity withdrawn	Locomotive numbers	Notes
1940	422	8	7589, 7607/11/13/17/59–60/63.	to WD 8 to 15
1944	414	2	7456, 7553	to NCC 18/19
1948	412	-5	47589, 47607/11/59–60.	Repatriated from SNCF
1959	417	25	47274/91/96/99, 47301/09/15/29/31/37/39/46/63–64/70/82/87/94, 47407/09/11/40/77/89, 47538.	
1960	392	48	47260/62/65/71/82, 47303/11/23/35/47/52/74, 47401/36/43/46/63/86/98, 47509–10/23/25/27–28/37/41/60–61/63/67–69/73/75–76/85–86/91/95, 47600/35–36/39/50/52/70/72.	
1961	344	34	47263/68/77, 47312/34/69/98, 47403/05/18/20–21/38/48/62/84, 47508/13/29/40/59/70–71/80, 47605/07/19–20/24–26/32/34/37.	
1962	310	75	47261/69–70/75/90/92, 47302/04/10/16/19/28/32/40/42/48/51/53/58/66/76/81/92, 47402/04/14/17/22/24–26/31/33/55/57/66/70/73–75/79/83/88/91/97, 47504/14/16/22/26/36/42/45–46/48/52/54–56/62/72/74/88/93, 47601/04/08/10/21/30/33/42/44/78.	
1963	235	40	47264/67/78/81/83/87/94, 47300/22/60/79/86, 47412–13/19/41/49/58–60/64/81/90/96, 47502/18/32/39/47/51/81–83/89. 47618/38/51/54/57/79.	
1964	195	49	47284/88/97, 47306/08/20/33/43–45/49/54–55/65/68/72/75/80/85/90, 47430/34/61/67/69/76/78/92, 47501/03/11/15/17/24/49–50/57–58/79/84/87/94, 47609/22–23/28/40/48/53.	
1965	146	63	47285–86/95, 47305/21/25/30/38/50/59/61–62/71/78/95/99, 47400/08/23/28–29/32/39/42/51–52/54/64/68/80/85/87/95/99, 47500/05/12/19–20/43–44/64/77–78/96–97, 47606/14/16/45–47/55–56/60/64–66/76–77/80–81.	
1966	83	77	47266/72–73/76/79–80/93/98, 47307/14/17–18/24/26–27/36/41/57/67/73/77/84/88–89/91/93/96–97, 47406/10/15–16/27/35/37/44–45/47/50/53/71–72/82/93–94, 47503/07/21/30/33/35/65–66/90/92/98–99, 47602–03/11–12/15/27/31/41/43/49/58–59/61–62/67–68/71/73–75.	47445 to NCB, 47279, 47298, 47324, 47327, 47357, 47406, 47445 and 47493 preserved.
1967	6	6	47289, 47313/83, 47531/34, 47629.	47383 preserved.

== Preservation ==
Due to their large numbers and late withdrawals, nine of these engines have been preserved, along with a spare set of frames and a boiler (from 47564). Many were restored within a few years of leaving the scrap heap, and most have a further working life ahead of them. All have steamed in preservation, with the exception of 47445.

One member of the class has operated on the main line in preservation. This was 7298/47298, which took part during the Rainhill celebrations in 1980 when it hauled a number of Steamport residents from the museum in Southport to Rainhill and also took part in the cavalcade. Owned by Ian Riley, in February 2017 it was undergoing its "ten-yearly overhaul" and was expected to return to operation "in a couple of years".

Locations and condition are shown below (current numbers in bold):

Image	Original Number (S&D number)	BR Number	Built	Builder	Withdrawn	Base	Status	Notes
	7119	**47279**	Aug 1924	Vulcan Foundry	Dec 1966	Keighley and Worth Valley Railway	Static Display	On display inside the museum at Oxenhope.
	7138	**47298**	Oct 1924	Hunslet Engine Company	Dec 1966	Ian Riley Engineering	Operational	
	16407	**47324**	Jun 1926	North British Locomotive Company	Dec 1966	East Lancashire Railway	Undergoing Overhaul	
	16410 (23)	47327	Jul 1926	North British Locomotive Company	Dec 1966	Midland Railway	Static Display	Currently painted in S&DJR Prussian Blue. Appeared in the film Train of Events, as a London yard shunter.
	**16440**	47357	Jul 1926	North British Locomotive Company	Dec 1966	Midland Railway	Running In	Made its first post overhaul moves in October 2023, to re-enter public service in December 2023.
	16466	**47383**	Oct 1926	Vulcan Foundry	Oct 1967	Severn Valley Railway	Static Display, Awaiting Overhaul	Last to be withdrawn. On display inside The Engine House at Highley.
	16489	**47406**	Dec 1926	Vulcan Foundry	Dec 1966	Great Central Railway	Static Display, Awaiting Overhaul	Currently on display inside Mountsorrel Railway's Museum.
	16528	**47445**	May 1927	Hunslet Engine Company	Apr 1966	Midland Railway	Under Restoration	Sold to NCB after withdrawal.
	16576	**47493**	Feb 1928	Vulcan Foundry	Dec 1966	Spa Valley Railway	Undergoing Overhaul	Only example preserved with screw reverser

== In fiction ==
An engine of this class can be seen in the Rev. W. Awdry's The Railway Series book The Eight Famous Engines. The character is named Jinty and comes from the "Other Railway" (a.k.a. British Railways) to help out when the main engines went on a journey to England.

In the video game Transport Tycoon by Chris Sawyer, the Jinty is offered as the cheapest and most basic engine in the game. The Jinty later appeared in Chris Sawyer's Locomotion as the third UK steam engine available, after the Fowler 4F, and the Stirling 8ft

== Models ==
An OO gauge model of the Class 3F was first produced by Tri-ang in 1952 and production continued after the company became Hornby Railways in the 1970s. Hornby released a retooled version in 1978 with better detailing and continue to produce that model for their "Railroad" range.

In the 2000s Bachmann Branchline released a more detailed OO model. In N gauge Graham Farish produced a model as a "GP Tank" in various liveries including some of other railway companies before later tooling an accurate 'Jinty' model. In O gauge and Gauge 1 Bachmann Brassworks produce an example. In O gauge, Connoisseur Models produces an etched brass kit. In HO (3.5 mm) scale Firedrake Productions produced a small run of 20 kits.

Darstaed, a model train company in Great Britain, produced O gauge tintype models of the LMS Fowler Class 3F, affectionately referring to them by the nickname of Jinty

Dapol has produced a Jinty for the O gauge market which was released in September 2017
