= Gortaloughan Halt railway station =

Railway station in Northern Ireland

Gortaloughan Halt

General information
- Location: Gortaloughan, County Fermanagh, Northern Ireland; UK

History
- Original company: Londonderry and Enniskillen Railway
- Post-grouping: Great Northern Railway (Ireland)

Key dates
- 23 September 1940: Station opens
- 1 October 1957: Station closes

Gortaloughan Halt railway station served Gortaloughan in County Fermanagh in Northern Ireland.

The Great Northern Railway (Ireland) opened the station on 23 September 1940.

It closed on 1 October 1957.

== Routes ==
Preceding station	Disused railways	Following station
Ballinamallard	Great Northern Railway (Ireland); Londonderry to Enniskillen	Enniskillen
