= WD ex-LMS Fowler Class 3F =

The War Department ex-LMS Fowler Class 3F consisted of 8 LMS Fowler Class 3F 0-6-0T steam locomotives requisitioned in 1940 from the London Midland and Scottish Railway (LMS).

== Career ==
The Class 3F 0-6-0Ts were selected by the War Department to be their standard shunting engine. Eight engines were prepared and exported to France during the Phoney War and were used to support British forces there. In an attempt to standardise, locomotives were chosen from the 1928 batch built by William Beardmore & Co., with the exception of one Hunslet-built engine, No. 7589. Two are thought to have been destroyed by retreating British forces during the chaotic retreat at the Fall of France. Photographic evidence exists showing one such example at Berlin-Tempelhof station in 1953 with Wehrmacht markings and had recently been in service, overhauled at Cottbus in 1944. The remaining known five were left behind and were subsequently pressed into SNCF service as their 030.TW class on Région Nord.

It was later (1943) decided to adopt the Hunslet Austerity 0-6-0ST as the War Department's shunting steam engine, so no more were required.

After the liberation of Europe, the surviving five were returned in August and September 1948, by which time the LMS had been nationalised into British Railways, and they assumed their original numbers within the ex-LMS Fowler Class 3F 0-6-0Ts, albeit with the addition of 40000 standard to most ex-LMS locomotives.

The eight engines concerned were as follows:

LMS No.	WD No.	SNCF No.	BR No.	Builder	Serial No.	Date built	Fate
7613	8	—	—	William Beardmore & Co.	361	1928	scrapped DR, Berlin, 1953/4
7611	9	030.TW.042	47611	William Beardmore & Co.	359	1928	Returned August 1948
7607	10	030.TW.043	47607	William Beardmore & Co.	355	1928	Returned September 1948
7660	11	030.TW.044	47660	William Beardmore & Co.	408	1929	Returned August 1948
7659	12	030.TW.026	47659	William Beardmore & Co.	407	1929	Returned September 1948
7663	13	—	—	William Beardmore & Co.	411	1929	Destroyed by 1945
7589	14	030.TW.027	47589	Hunslet Engine Company	1613	1929	Returned September 1948
7617	15	—	—	William Beardmore & Co.	365	1928	Destroyed by 1945

Of these, WD No. 9 (ex-LMS 7611) was sent instead of 1928 Hunslet built No. 7587 which had been prepared for WD service.

The following engines were ordered to be prepared for service but were not actually sent. These were quickly returned to LMS stock, and the allocated WD numbers were reused for ex-LMS diesel shunters. All these were also Beardmore engines:

LMS No.	WD No.	Builder	Serial No.	Date built
7620	23	William Beardmore & Co.	368	1928
7624	24	William Beardmore & Co.	372	1928
7629	22	William Beardmore & Co.	377	1928
7631	20	William Beardmore & Co.	379	1928
7638	19	William Beardmore & Co.	386	1928
7643	21	William Beardmore & Co.	391	1929

The five that returned were withdrawn between 1961 and 1966 and none were preserved.
