= Ballybay railway station =

Former railway station in Ireland

Ballybay

General information
- Location: Castleblaney Rd. Ballybay, County Monaghan; Ireland
- Coordinates: 54.1299°N 6.8999°W
- Platforms: 1

History
- Original company: Dundalk and Enniskillen Railway
- Post-grouping: Great Northern Railway (Ireland)

Key dates
- 17 July 1854: Station opens
- 10 October 1957: Station closes to passengers
- 1 January 1960: Station closes to goods

Services
Preceding station	Dundalk and Enniskillen Railway	Following station
Castleblayney	Dundalk to Enniskillen	Monaghan Road
Terminus	Ballybay to Cootehill	Rockcorry
Location

Ballybay railway station was on the Dundalk and Enniskillen Railway in Ireland.

== History ==
It opened on 17 July 1854, closed to passengers on 14 October 1957 and later completely on 1 January 1960.
