= NCC Class Y =

Class of ex LMS Class 3F 0-6-0T

Type and origin
- Power type: Steam
- Builder: No.18: W. G. Bagnall & Co., Stafford; No.19: Hunslet Engine Company, Leeds
- Build date: No.18: 1926; No.19: 1928
Specifications
- Configuration
  - Whyte: 0-6-0T
- Gauge: 5 ft 3 in (1,600 mm)
- Driver dia.: 4 ft 7 in (1.397 m)
- Wheelbase: 16 ft 6 in (5.03 m)
- Length: 31 ft 4 3/4 in (9.57 m)
- Width: 8 ft 9 in (2.67 m)
- Height: 12 ft 6 7/8 in (3.83 m)
- Axle load: 14 long tons 3 cwt (31,700 lb or 14.4 t) + 17 long tons 14 cwt (39,600 lb or 18 t) + 17 long tons 13 cwt (39,500 lb or 17.9 t)
- Loco weight: 49 long tons 10 cwt (110,900 lb or 50.3 t) (110,900 lb or 50.3 t)
- Fuel type: Coal
- Fuel capacity: 2.25 long tons (2.29 t; 2.52 short tons)
- Water cap.: 1,200 imp gal (5,500 L; 1,400 US gal)
- Boiler pressure: 160 psi (1,103.2 kPa)
- Heating surface
  - Firebox: 97 sq ft (9.0 m^{2})
  - Tubes: 967.5 sq ft (89.88 m^{2})
  - Total surface: 1,064.5 sq ft (98.90 m^{2})
- Cylinders: Two, inside
- Cylinder size: 18 in × 26 in (457 mm × 660 mm)
- Valve gear: Stephenson link
- Train brakes: Automatic vacuum
Performance figures
- Tractive effort: 20,830 lbf (92.7 kN)
- Factor of adh.: 5.32
Career
- Operators: Northern Counties Committee (LMS); → Ulster Transport Authority
- Number in class: 2
- Numbers: 18, 19
- Scrapped: No.18: 1956; No.19: 1963

The LMS Northern Counties Committee (NCC) Class Y was a class of 0-6-0T steam locomotives formed when two LMS Fowler Class 3F engines (Nos.7456 and 7553) were regauged from 4 ft 8 1/2 in (1,435 mm) standard gauge to the 5 ft 3 in (1,600 mm) Irish broad gauge in 1944 becoming NCC Nos.18 and 19.

== History ==
During World War II, the NCC was very short of shunting motive power and as no new engines were available, three engines were transferred from the Dundalk, Newry and Greenore Railway (DNGR). The DNGR engines were not a success and the NCC turned to the parent LMS for help. They offered two standard LMS Fowler Class 3F 0-6-0T locomotives.

These engines had been developed from S. W. Johnson's Midland Railway locomotives introduced in 1899. Johnson's locomotives were originally built with round-topped fireboxes but they were all rebuilt with Belpaire fireboxes from 1919.

Developed by Sir Henry Fowler for the LMS and introduced in 1924 the new locomotives had a Belpaire firebox from new, wider side tanks, larger bunker and an extended smokebox. A ventilator was also fitted in the cab roof. This class became the LMS "standard" shunting locomotive. With the exception of a batch of 15 locomotives which were built by the former Lancashire and Yorkshire Railway workshops at Horwich, Lancashire, all were built by outside contractors.

NCC No.18, originally LMS No. 16539, was part of a batch of 15, numbered from 16535–16549, built by W. G. Bagnall & Co. of Stafford in 1926/7. In the LMS 1934 renumbering scheme it became No.7456.

NCC No.19, originally LMS No. 16636, was part of a large batch of 50 locomotives built by the Hunslet Engine Company of Leeds, West Yorkshire, between 1927 and 1929 and originally numbered from 16625–16674. It was renumbered 7553 in the 1934 renumbering scheme.

The engines were reboilered by the LMS in 1944, just before delivery to the NCC in August. The conversion to 5 ft 3 in (1,600 mm) gauge was simply done by reversing the wheels and renewing the tyres and crank pins. Their frames were not altered at all and, possibly due to the light nature of their work, the engines do not seem to have suffered from widening the gauge.

One unusual feature of the engines was the position of the sandboxes which entailed having recesses in the tanks so that they could be filled. Another distinctive feature, and uncommon on the NCC, was the provision of "dogs" around the circumference of the smokebox to keep the joint airtight.

Designated Class Y, the engines were at first used on local trains to Carrickfergus but this practice was discontinued when it was discovered that the bearings were inclined to run hot. A test train of thirty wagons of coal was worked by No.19 from Belfast to Ballyclare Junction without any difficulty. No.18 worked a similar train but had trouble with lubrication.

Subsequently, they were put to work on the Belfast Harbour Commissioners' lines at Belfast docks where despite their relatively long wheelbase they could negotiate a 4-chain (80 m) curve if they proceeded slowly.

All together No.18 ran 219,441 miles (353,156 km) on the NCC and a total of 612,266 miles (985,347 km) in service. A suspect crank pin led to early withdrawal in 1956. No.19 ran 667,521 miles (1,074,271 km) all together, of which 291,971 miles (469,880 km) were on the NCC. It lasted until 1963 although not doing much work in its final year.

In late Spring 1960 the Ulster Transport Authority acquired two 0-6-4Ts from the former Sligo, Leitrim and Northern Counties Railway, which took over duties on Belfast docks. These became Nos. 26 and 27 in the UTA stock list and continued to carry the names Lough Melvin and Lough Erne respectively.

== Livery ==
All over black, red buffer beams with numbers in shaded digits. Lettered NCC on side tank, cast number plate with red background applied to bunker sides.

Under the ownership of the UTA that company's crest was applied to the side tanks in place of the NCC lettering.
