= Newbliss railway station =

Former railway station in Ireland

Newbliss

General information
- Location: Newbliss, County Monaghan; Ireland

History
- Original company: Dundalk and Enniskillen Railway
- Post-grouping: Great Northern Railway (Ireland)

Key dates
- 14 August 1855: Station opens
- 14 October 1957: Station closes
Location

Newbliss railway station was on the Dundalk and Enniskillen Railway in the Republic of Ireland. It served Newbliss.

== History ==
The Dundalk and Enniskillen Railway opened the station on 14 August 1855.

The station was closed to passenger traffic on 1 October 1957, due to the Northern Ireland government closing the cross-border lines in the north 2 weeks earlier, but survived to goods traffic until 1960.

== Routes ==
Preceding station	Disused railways	Following station
Monaghan Road	Dundalk and Enniskillen Railway; Dundalk to Enniskillen	Clones
