= SLNCR Leitrim class =

Class of 5 two-cylinder 0-6-4T locomotives

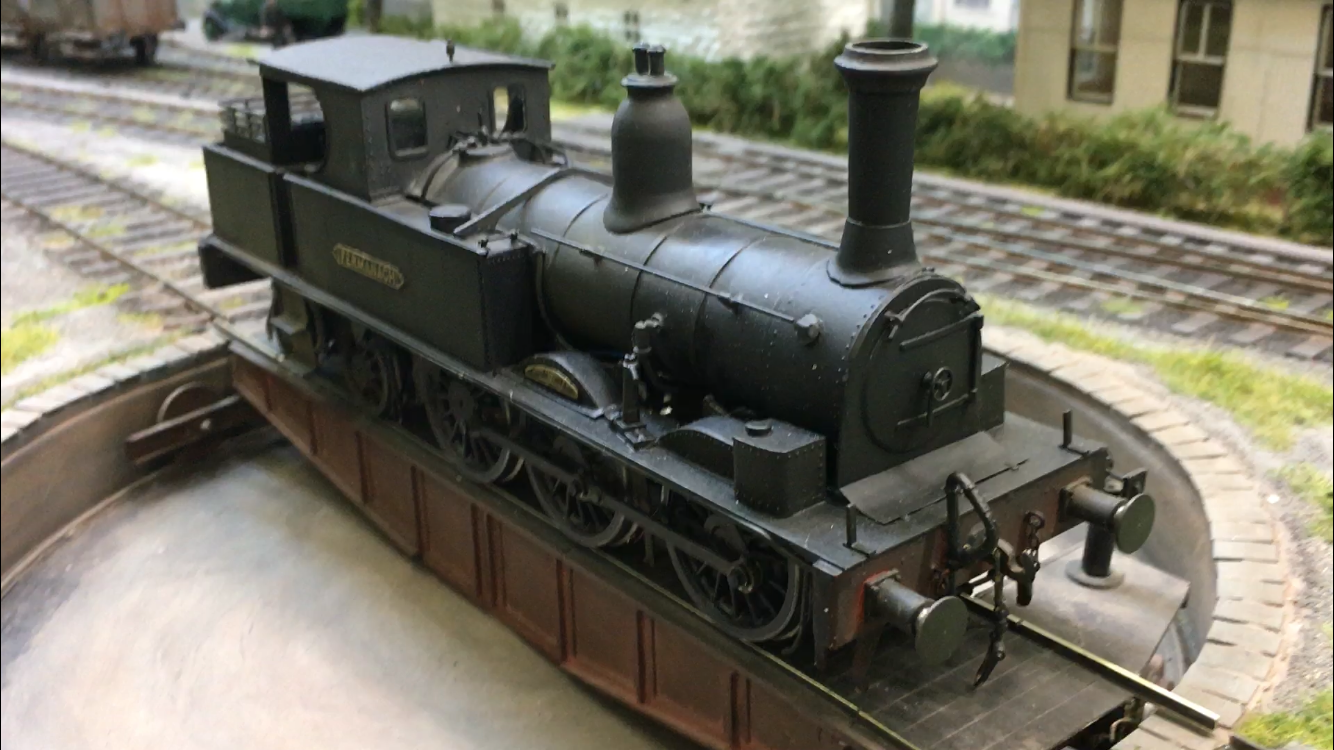
- Model of locomotive 'Fermanagh' in Aldershot in 2017
Type and origin
- Power type: Steam
- Builder: Beyer, Peacock
- Build date: 1882, 1895, 1899
- Total produced: 5
Specifications
- Configuration
  - Whyte: 0-6-4T
  - UIC: C2′ n2t
- Gauge: 5 ft 3 in (1,600 mm)
- Driver dia.: 4 ft 9 in (1.448 m)
- Fuel type: Coal
- Cylinders: Two, inside
- Cylinder size: 16 1/2 in × 20 in (419 mm × 508 mm)
- Train heating: Steam
- Loco brake: Steam
Career
- Operators: SLNCR
- Class: SLNCR: Leitrim
- Numbers: SLNCR: none
- Official name: Fermanagh, Leitrim, Lurganboy, Hazelwood, Lissadell
- Withdrawn: 1947–1957
- Disposition: All scrapped

The Sligo, Leitrim and Northern Counties Railway Leitrim Class was a class of five 0-6-4T locomotives built by Beyer, Peacock and Company between 1882 and 1889 for the SLNCR.

== Versions ==
In 1879 Beyer, Peacock and Company supplied the South Australian Railways K class, which was built to the Irish gauge and designed to run on lightweight track. As a result, and after the disappointment of the Pioneer class, the SL&NCR ordered an enlarged version of this design which became the SLNCR Leitrim class.

Beyer, Peacock delivered the first two of this class Fermanagh and Leitrim, in 1882. They proved to be reliable and the SL&NCR obtained further examples from Beyer, Peacock: Lurganboy in 1895; Lissadell and Hazelwood in 1899. The SL&NCR started withdrawing the class from service in 1947 and one of the class survived until the closure of the line in 1957. "Lissadell" was sold in working order to Hammond Lane Foundry in 1954 and survived until broken up at Manorhamilton in 1957.

== Model ==
A 1:43 scale (O gauge, both 4′ 8″ and 5′ 3″) brass kit is available from Studio Scale Models.

== See also ==
- Steam locomotives of Ireland
