= Sligo, Leitrim and Northern Counties Railway =

Railway in Ireland, 1875 to 1957

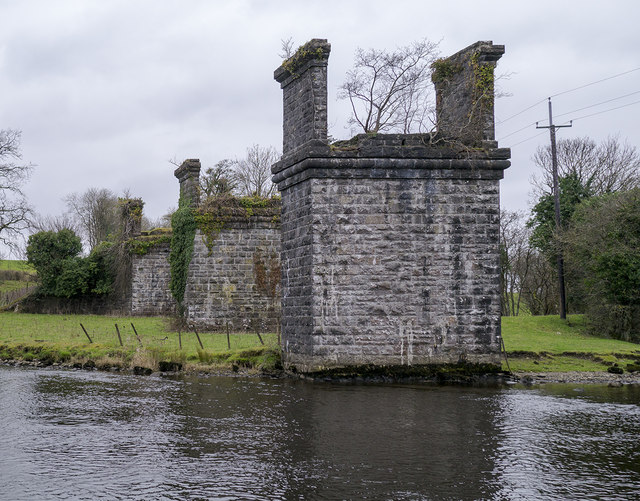
- Remains of SL&NCR railway bridge at Enniskillen

Overview
- Dates of operation: 1879–1957

Technical
- Track gauge: 5 ft 3 in (1,600 mm)
- Length: 43 miles 21 chains (69.6 km) (1922)
- Track length: 45 miles 61 chains (73.6 km) (1922)

The Sligo, Leitrim and Northern Counties Railway (SL&NCR) was a 5 ft 3 in (1,600 mm) railway in counties Cavan, Fermanagh, Leitrim and Sligo in north-west Ireland. It consisted of one main line, with no branch lines and remained privately owned until its closure.

== History ==
From the time that the Londonderry and Enniskillen Railway (L&ER) was completed in 1859 there was a number of proposals to connect the line with Sligo. A "Londonderry, Enniskillen and Sligo Railway" was proposed that would have run west from Enniskillen via Manorhamilton direct to Sligo. The Enniskillen and Bundoran Railway (E&BR) was incorporated in 1862, was opened from Bundoran Junction on the L&ER to Bundoran on the Atlantic coast in 1868 and had legal powers granted by its act of Parliament to continue from Bundoran to Sligo, but failed to do so.

Sligo, Leitrim and Northern Counties Railway Act 1875
- Act of Parliament
- Parliament of the United Kingdom
- Long title: An Act for making a Railway from the Midland Great Western Railway of Ireland, near the town of Ballysadare in the county of Sligo, through the counties of Leitrim and Cavan, to the Irish North Western Railway, near the town of Enniskillen in the county of Fermanagh; and for other purposes.
- Citation: 38 & 39 Vict. c. cxcvii

Dates
- Royal assent: 11 August 1875

Text of statute as originally enacted

The Sligo, Leitrim and Northern Counties Railway Company was incorporated by the Sligo, Leitrim and Northern Counties Railway Act 1875 (38 & 39 Vict. c. cxcvii), and its construction started at a junction with the Great Northern Railway (GNR) at Enniskillen and proceeded westwards. The E&BR accepted defeat and in 1878 Parliament passed the Enniskillen, Bundoran, and Sligo Railway Amendment Act 1878 (41 & 42 Vict. c. cc) allowing it to abandon its commitment to extend to Sligo from Bundoran. The SL&NCR adopted as its company seal a picture of two steam locomotives colliding, with one derailed and the other remaining on the track. This commemorated the SL&NCR's success in reaching Sligo and the E&BR's failure to do the same.

A railway, forty-two miles one furlong nine chains in length, commencing by a junction with the Midland Great Western Railway of Ireland, in the townland of Carricknagat in the parish of Ballysadare in the county of Sligo, through the counties of Leitrim and Cavan, and terminating by a junction with the Irish North-western Railway, in the townland of Breandrum in the parish of Enniskillen in the county of Fermanagh. — Section 5, Sligo, Leitrim and Northern Counties Railway Act 1875 (38 & 39 Vict. c. cxcvii)

The SL&NCR opened as far as Belcoo in 1879, Manorhamilton in 1880, Collooney in 1881 and Carrignagat Junction on the Midland Great Western Railway (MGWR) opened in 1882, completing a line of about 43 miles (69 km). Beyond Carrignagat Junction the SL&NCR exercised running powers over the MGWR to and from Sligo.

In 1895 the Waterford, Limerick and Western Railway (WL&WR) was extended to Collooney, forming junctions with the MGWR and SL&NCR. This gave access to a larger area of western Ireland, whose cattle exports formed a significant part of the SL&NCR's traffic.

The SL&NCR was one of the railways that the Irish Free State's Great Southern Railways did not absorb in 1925 because it crossed the border with Northern Ireland. It became the last privately-owned railway undertaking to survive in Ireland (although the Londonderry and Lough Swilly Railway still existed as a road transport firm).

The company never prospered since the countryside it crossed was poor and sparsely populated, although at one time intermittent heavy cattle traffic used the line. Governments on both sides of the border subsidised the railway in its later years, but the SL&NCR closed on 1 October 1957 as a result of the Government of Northern Ireland making the GNR Board close its line through Enniskillen.

== Motive power ==
SL&NCR locomotives had names, but were not numbered. The company had the use of only two turntables: its own at Enniskillen and the Midland Great Western Railway one at Sligo, and so tank engines were the preferred option.

=== Pioneer and Sligo ===
Its first two main line locomotives were a pair with an 0-6-2T wheel arrangement, Pioneer and Sligo, built by the Avonside Engine Company of Bristol, England and delivered in 1877. These were unsteady riders on the SL&NCR's light track, but the company kept them in service until 1921.

=== Leitrim class ===
After the disappointment of the Pioneer class, the SL&NCR turned to the 0-6-4T wheel arrangement. In 1879 Beyer, Peacock & Company of Manchester, England had supplied the South Australian Railways K class, which was built to the Irish gauge and designed to run on lightweight track. As a result, the SL&NCR ordered an enlarged version of this design which became the SLNCR Leitrim class. Beyer, Peacock delivered the first two of this class, Fermanagh and Leitrim, in 1882. Proving reliable, the SL&NCR obtained further examples from Beyer, Peacock in 1895, Hazelwood and 1899, Lissadell The SL&NCR started withdrawing the class from service in 1947 and one of the class survived until the closure of the line in 1957.

=== Sir Henry class ===
In 1904 Beyer, Peacock delivered Sir Henry, an enlarged and modernised 0-6-4T design, the SLNCR Sir Henry class. Enniskillen was delivered in 1905 and "Lough Gill" in 1917. All three survived until the closure of the line in 1957.

=== Lough class ===
Further enlargement and modernisation of the design resulted in the SLNCR Lough class. There were only two locomotives of this type, Lough Melvin and Lough Erne, and they were built by Beyer, Peacock in 1949. When the line was closed in 1957 they were sold to the Ulster Transport Authority (UTA), with whom they remained in service until the 1960s. One of them, Lough Erne, is now preserved by the Railway Preservation Society of Ireland at Whitehead, County Antrim.

=== Railbuses and railcars ===
The SL&NCR was an early adopter of railbuses and railcars, which it introduced in the 1930s and 1940s. One of the latter, Railcar B, was built in 1947 and is now preserved by the Downpatrick and County Down Railway at Downpatrick.

== Sources and further reading ==
- Baker, Michael H. C. (1972). Irish Railways since 1916. Ian Allan. ISBN 0711002827. OCLC 248259641.
- Dewick, Tony (2002). Complete Atlas of Railway Station Names. Hersham: Ian Allan Publishing. maps 56, 57. ISBN 0-7110-2798-6.
- Flanagan, Colm (2003). Diesel Dawn. Newtownards: Colourpoint Books. ISBN 1-904242-08-1.
- Hajducki, S. Maxwell (1974). A Railway Atlas of Ireland. Newton Abbott: David & Charles. maps 6, 7, 12, 13. ISBN 0-7153-5167-2.
- Hamilton, Michael (1997). Down Memory Line, Sligo Leitrim & Northern Counties Railway. Manorhamilton: Drumlin Publications. ISBN 1-873437-18-8.
- Sprinks, N.W. (1970). Sligo, Leitrim and Northern Counties Railway. Billericay: Irish Railway Record Society (London Area).
