= Ballinamallard railway station =

Former railway station in Northern Ireland

Ballinamallard
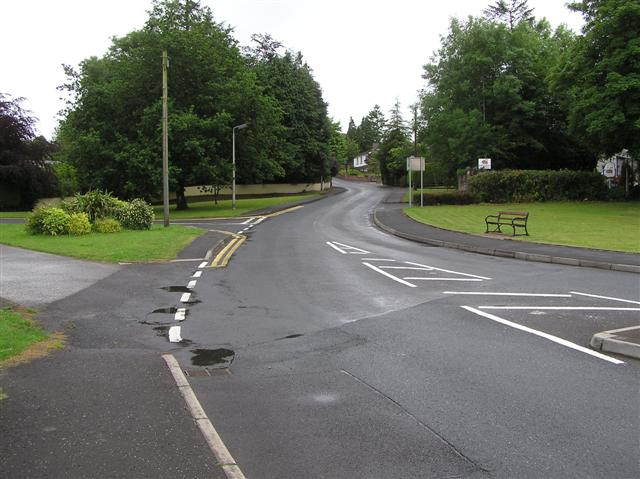
- The current site of Ballinamallard station, heading south

General information
- Location: Ballinamallard, County Fermanagh, Northern Ireland; UK
- Coordinates: 54.4188°N 7.5956°W
- Elevation: 207 ft (63 m)

History
- Opened: 19 August 1854
- Closed: 1 October 1957
- Original company: Londonderry and Enniskillen Railway
- Post-grouping: Great Northern Railway (Ireland)

Services
Preceding station	Londonderry and Enniskillen Railway	Following station
Bundoran Junction	Londonderry to Enniskillen	Gortaloughan Halt
Location

Ballinamallard railway station served Ballinamallard in County Fermanagh in Northern Ireland.

The Londonderry and Enniskillen Railway opened the station on 19 August 1854. It was taken over by the Great Northern Railway (Ireland) in 1883.

It closed on 1 October 1957.
