= Ballinamallard =

Village in County Fermanagh, Northern Ireland

Coordinates: 54.422°N 7.595°W

Ballinamallard: Irish: Béal Átha na Mallacht
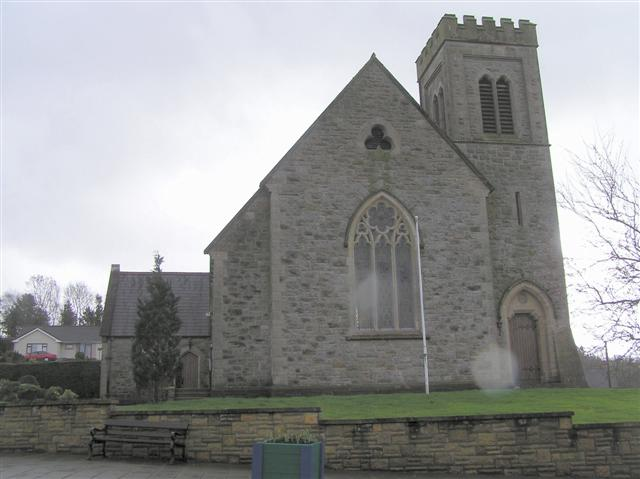
- The Methodist church

- Location within Northern Ireland
- Population: 1,364 (2021 Census)
- Irish grid reference: H260528
- District: Fermanagh and Omagh
- County: County Fermanagh
- Country: Northern Ireland
- Sovereign state: United Kingdom
- Post town: ENNISKILLEN
- Postcode district: BT94
- Dialling code: 028
- UK Parliament: Fermanagh and South Tyrone
- NI Assembly: Fermanagh and South Tyrone

Ballinamallard or Bellanamallard (from Irish Béal Átha na Mallacht 'ford-mouth of the curses') is the name of a small village and of a townland in County Fermanagh, Northern Ireland. It had a population of 1,364 people in the 2021 Census. It lies to the north of Enniskillen and is within Fermanagh and Omagh district.

The village has won several "best kept village" titles, and has a fountain to mark the honour. There has been only one local primary school: Ballinamallard Controlled Primary School, since the other, Shanmullagh Primary School, closed in August 2008.

As of 2016 NISRA estimate that 2,754 people live in the Ballinamallard Electoral Ward, which encompasses a larger area than the settlement.

== History ==
Magheracross Parish is said to have been founded by St Patrick in about AD 450. In about AD 550 St Columba passed thorough Ballinamallard. The first records of the parish itself were in 1492 with Terence Macgillacossgli (McCusker/Cosgrave/Cuskelly) is recorded as vicar of Magheracross and Derrybrusk, Maghercross was at that time part of Derryvullen parish.

In 1500 two Maguire princes were ambushed by the O'Neills at Ballinamallard in their conflict and in 1539 the original Magheracross church destroyed by fire.

1593 saw the start of Hugh O'Neill's war that resulted in the Flight of the Earls in 1611. Following which Henry Folliot of Pyrton in Wiltshire, was granted the manor of Drumchine (later Newporton) including 1,500 Irish acres through Magheracross parish. He built Castle Murray and imported tenants from the Scottish Borders between Dumfries and Carlisle who were fleeing the union of England and Scotland and the consequent pacification of the previously lawless area around Anglo-Scottish border under James I that was taking place at that time.

By 1622 there were 20 houses in Ballinamallard and the Church "standing but not repaired within". In 1629 the old graveyard at Kilskeery and Magheracross was officially united with Kilskeery parish.

Christian religion was important through the 18th century. In 1704, Rev N Browne, Rector of Kilskeery, translated the Prayer Book into Irish. In 1766, Magheracross parish split from Kilskeery and in 1769 John Wesley visited the area bringing Methodism. Coa Chapel was built in 1770. Ballinamallard Church of Ireland church was built in 1785 and the Methodist Hall was constructed in 1800. The present Church of Ireland was built in 1844.

The 18th century also saw non-religious developments, Magheracross House was built in 1740 and the Ballinamallard bridge was built in 1750. 1783 saw the Repeal of Poyning's Law and the birth of Orange Peggy.

In the early 20th century, thousands of Cooneyites or "Dippers", followers of Edward Cooney and William Irvine, flocked to religious conventions at Crocknacrieve House near Ballinamallard. Converts were baptised by immersing them in Lough Erne or tributary rivers, events which attracted large crowds and international attention.

On the 16 October 1943 a Royal Air Force, Consolidated PBY Catalina (AH551) flying boat had departed RAF Killadeas on a training. The aircraft crashed into a hillside near Ballinamallard after the crew failed to recover from a practice stall. Eight of the Ten crew died in the crash.

== Economy ==
Many family businesses are located in Ballinamallard. In the 1970s the Development Association initiated some useful projects. The former Great Northern Railway station was converted to become Rascal's PlayStation, a purpose-built child care centre; the Commons was transformed to a children's playground, and industrial units were established on Enniskillen Road.

In 2007, Severfield purchased the Fisher family's Fisher Engineering for £88 million. The structural steelwork contractor was founded by the late Thomas Fisher when he returned from World War II, originally as an agricultural engineer, and went on to provide structural steelwork for the Belfast Waterfront Hall and Dublin Convention Centre. Now known as Severfield (NI) Ltd, it continues to be a major employer in the area.

== Transport ==
Ballinamallard railway station opened on 19 August 1854, but was finally closed on 1 October 1957.

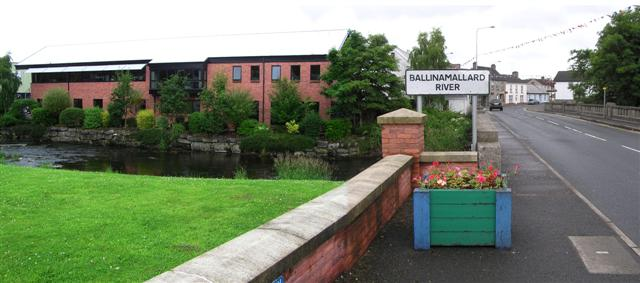
The river

== Sport ==
The village is the home to the association football clubs Fermanagh Mallards F.C. and Ballinamallard United. Ballinamallard United, which plays in the IFA Premiership, was previously the club of former Manchester United goalkeeper Roy Carroll.

The area is also noted for its trout fishing, with Erne tributaries flowing through and around the village.

== People ==
- Douglas James Smyth Crozier – former Director of Education of Hong Kong
- Sir Edward Poynter married, Agnes, another of the MacDonald sisters so he also had roots in the village.
- Michael Jackson, the current Church of Ireland Archbishop of Dublin and Glendalough, lived in Ballinamallard in his youth. Archbishop Jackson previously served as Church of Ireland Lord Bishop of Clogher.
- Tom Elliott, Baron Elliott of Ballinamallard - former Ulster Unionist Party leader, farmer and retired soldier has lived all his life in the village and is current chair of the Ballinamallard United F.C. Board.

== Demographics ==
=== 2021 census ===
The town of Ballinamallard is labelled as Super Data Zone Erne_North_E according to the Northern Ireland Statistics and Research Agency. On census day 2021 (21 March 2021), the usually resident population of Ballinamallard Settlement was 1,364. Of these:

- 8.9% belong to or were brought up in the Catholic religion and 83.4% belong to or were brought up in a 'Protestant and Other Christian (including Christian related)' religion.
- 73.0% indicated that they had a British national identity, 6.1% had an Irish national identity and 34.0% had a Northern Irish national identity.

=== 2011 census ===
On census day 2011 (27 March 2011), the usually resident population of Ballinamallard Settlement was 1,436 accounting for 0.08% of the NI total. Of these:

- 99.16% were from the white (including Irish Traveller) ethnic group.
- 8.98% belong to or were brought up in the Catholic religion and 87.81% belong to or were brought up in a 'Protestant and Other Christian (including Christian related)' religion.
- 75.77% indicated that they had a British national identity, 6.62% had an Irish national identity and 28.41% had a Northern Irish national identity.

As of the 2011 census, in Ballinamallard Settlement, considering the population aged 3 years old and over:

- 3.49% had some knowledge of Irish.
- 6.32% had some knowledge of Ulster-Scots.
- 1.89% did not have English as their first language.

=== 2001 census ===
As of the 2001 census, Ballinamallard was classified as a village by the Northern Ireland Statistics and Research Agency (NISRA) (i.e. with a population between 1,000 people and 2,250 people). On census day 29 April 2001, there were 1,340 people living in Ballinamallard. Of these:

- 24.9% were aged under 16 and 14.9% were aged 60 and over
- 49.3% of the population were male and 50.7% were female
- 3.4% were from a Catholic background and 95.6% were from a Protestant background
- 3.2% of people aged 16–74 were unemployed.
