= Irish North Western Railway =

Former Irish railway company

Coordinates: 54.347°N 7.640°W

- Industry: Railway
- Predecessor: Dundalk and Enniskillen Railway
- Founded: 1862
- Defunct: 1876
- Fate: merged
- Successor: Great Northern Railway
- Headquarters: Dundalk, Ireland
- Area served: Counties Cavan, Fermanagh, Londonderry, Donegal, Louth, Monaghan, Tyrone

Irish North Western Railway (INW) was an Irish gauge (5 ft 3 in (1,600 mm)) railway company in Ireland.

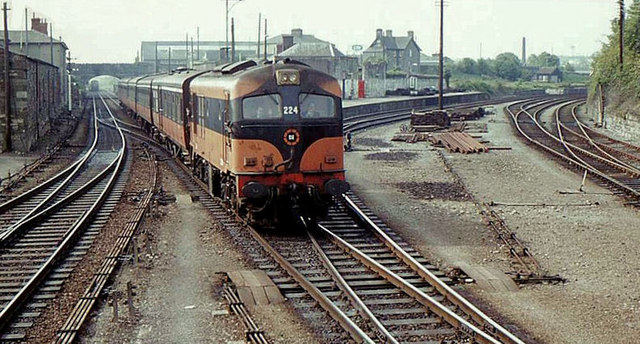
The stub of the line toward Enniskillen veering right with a train straight from Bray heading for Dundalk Clarke

== Development ==
Dundalk and Enniskillen Railway Act 1845
- Act of Parliament
- Parliament of the United Kingdom
- Long title: An Act for effecting a Railway Communication between Dundalk and Enniskillen.
- Citation: 8 & 9 Vict. c. xcvi

Dates
- Royal assent: 21 July 1845

Dundalk and Enniskillen Railway Act 1847
- Act of Parliament
- Parliament of the United Kingdom
- Long title: An Act to alter and amend several of the Powers Provisions of the Act relating to the Dundalk and Enniskillen Railway.
- Citation: 10 & 11 Vict. c. lxv

Dates
- Royal assent: 25 June 1847

Text of statute as originally enacted

Dundalk and Enniskillen Railway Act 1850
- Act of Parliament
- Parliament of the United Kingdom
- Long title: An Act to extend the Powers of the Dundalk and Enniskillen Railway Company for the Purchase of Lands and Completion of Works on Part of their Railway; and for other Purposes.
- Citation: 13 & 14 Vict. c. lxxvi

Dates
- Royal assent: 29 July 1850

Text of statute as originally enacted

The company was founded as the Dundalk and Enniskillen Railway (D&ER) by the Dundalk and Enniskillen Railway Act 1845 (8 & 9 Vict. c. xcvi), and opened the first section of its line, from Dundalk Quay Street to Castleblayney, in 1849. In Dundalk the D&ER line crossed the Dublin and Belfast Junction Railway main line, which was completed between Drogheda and its own separate Dundalk station in the same year.

Dundalk and Enniskillen Railway Act 1852
- Act of Parliament
- Parliament of the United Kingdom
- Long title: An Act to amend the Acts relating to the Dundalk and Enniskillen Railway, and to extend the same from Ballybay to Enniskillen.
- Citation: 15 & 16 Vict. c. xli

Dates
- Royal assent: 28 May 1852

Text of statute as originally enacted

Dundalk and Enniskillen Railway Act 1857
- Act of Parliament
- Parliament of the United Kingdom
- Long title: An Act to enable the Dundalk and Enniskillen Railway Company to make certain Deviations and Alterations in their Line and Works; and for other Purposes connected with their Undertaking.
- Citation: 20 & 21 Vict. c. civ

Dates
- Royal assent: 27 July 1857

Text of statute as originally enacted

With further authority from the Dundalk and Enniskillen Railway Act 1852 (15 & 16 Vict. c. xli), the D&ER extended westwards, reaching Ballybay in 1854, Newbliss in 1855 and Lisbellaw in 1858. In 1859 the D&ER reached Enniskillen where it connected with the Londonderry and Enniskillen Railway (L&ER). The L&ER had been completed in 1854 but had been unprofitable, so in 1860 it leased its line in perpetuity to the D&ER. This gave the D&ER a direct route between Dundalk and Londonderry Foyle Road.

Irish North-western Railway Act 1862
- Act of Parliament
- Parliament of the United Kingdom
- Long title: An Act for changing the Name of the Dundalk and Enniskillen Railway Company to the Name "The Irish North-western Railway Company;" and for authorizing them to make and maintain an additional Line of Railway and other Works; and to make Arrangements with other Companies and Public Bodies; and to raise further Monies; and for other Purposes.
- Citation: 25 & 26 Vict. c. cxxxix

Dates
- Royal assent: 7 July 1862

Text of statute as originally enacted

Irish North Western Railway (Quay Extension) Act 1863
- Act of Parliament
- Parliament of the United Kingdom
- Long title: An Act to empower the Irish North-western Railway Company to extend their Railway along the Quays of Dundalk; and for other Purposes.
- Citation: 26 & 27 Vict. c. ccxxxvi

Dates
- Royal assent: 28 July 1863

Text of statute as originally enacted

Irish North-western Railway Act 1864
- Act of Parliament
- Parliament of the United Kingdom
- Long title: An Act for the Discharge of Debts of the Irish North-western Railway Company; and for authorizing divers Arrangements between that Company and other Railway Companies; and for other Purposes.
- Citation: 27 & 28 Vict. c. ccliii

Dates
- Royal assent: 25 July 1864

Text of statute as originally enacted

In 1862 the INW opened a branch from Clones southwards to Cavan. In the same year the company was renamed the Irish North Western Railway by the Irish North-western Railway Act 1862 (25 & 26 Vict. c. cxxxix). In 1863 the Ulster Railway reached Clones where it made a junction with the INW. In 1868 the Enniskillen and Bundoran Railway opened between Bundoran Junction and Bundoran, and contracted the INW to operate its line.

In 1876 the INW merged with the Northern Railway of Ireland and the Ulster Railway to form the Great Northern Railway.

== After merger ==
The GNR operated the line between Dundalk and Enniskillen until 1957, when the Government of Northern Ireland made the GNR Board close all cross-border lines except the Dublin and Belfast Junction Railway mainline. Córas Iompair Éireann continued a freight service between Dundalk and Clones for a few years, but withdrew this and closed the line in 1960.

== Sources ==
- Baker, Michael H.C. (1972). Irish Railways since 1916. London: Ian Allan. pp. 153, 207. ISBN 0-7110-0282-7.
- Dewick, Tony (2002). Complete Atlas of Railway Station Names. Hersham: Ian Allan Publishing. maps 57, 58, 60. ISBN 0-7110-2798-6.
- FitzGerald, J.D. (1995). The Derry Road. Colourpoint Transport. Vol. 2. Gortrush: Colourpoint Press. ISBN 1-898392-09-9.
- Hajducki, S. Maxwell (1974). A Railway Atlas of Ireland. Newton Abbott: David & Charles. ISBN 0-7153-5167-2.
