= List of archaeological sites in County Fermanagh =

List of archaeological sites in County Fermanagh, Northern Ireland:

== A ==
- Aghaherrish, Counterscarp rath, grid ref: H1312 4467
- Aghahoorin, Bivallate rath, grid ref: H1185 4573
- Aghakillymaud, Court tomb, grid ref: H2730 3097
- Aghalane Castle, in Killycloghan townland, grid ref: H3410 2000
- Aghaleague, Counterscarp rath, grid ref: H2338 6448
- Aghameelan, Two standing stones, grid ref: H0876 5509
- Aghanaglack, Dual court tomb: Giant’s Grave, grid ref: H0981 4358
- Aghanaglack, Cashel, grid ref: H1113 4361
- Aghanaglack, Cave adapted for use as a Souterrain, grid ref: H1085 4357
- Aghanaglack, Cross-shaft and base, grid ref: H1083 4351
- Aghatirourke, Platform rath, grid ref: H1708 3237
- Aghatirourke, Standing stone, grid ref: H1702 3225
- Aghatirourke, Pre-historic enclosure, grid ref: H1692 3196
- Annaghmore Glebe, Cairn kerb: Druid’s Temple, grid ref: H4266 2007
- Ardshankill, Bivallate rath, grid ref: H1048 6330
- Ardvarny East, Counterscarp rath, grid ref: H2229 6363
- Ardvarny West, Stone cross head, grid ref: H2128 6363

== B ==
- Ballygonnell & Rabron, Rath, grid ref: H1850 4804
- Ballyhill, Rath, church (site of) and graveyard, grid ref: H3927 4364
- Ballyreagh, Dual court tomb: Giant’s Graves, grid ref: H3145 5041
- Ballyreagh, Standing stones, grid ref: H3137 5864
- Banagher, Rath, grid ref: H1935 4758
- Beagho, Platform rath, grid ref: H3118 4137
- Beihy, Court tomb, grid ref: H1603 3044
- Beihy, Multiple cist cairn, grid ref: H1727 3108
- Bigwood (Drumkeeran), Bivallate rath, grid ref: H1251 6687
- Black Pig's Dyke, Part of linear earthwork, in Lislea townland, grid ref: H4836 2706
- Black Pig's Dyke, in Mullynavannoge townland, grid ref: H4838 2631 – H4850 2590
- Boa Island, Counterscarp rath, Dreenan townland, grid ref: H0744 6250
- Boa Island, Carved stones, graveyard and enclosure, Dreenan townland, grid ref: H0852 6197
- Braade, Sweat house, grid ref: H0540 5472
- Breagho, Possible megalithic tomb, grid ref: H2673 4867
- Brookhill, Counterscarp rath, grid ref: H0770 6498
- Brougher, Megalith and alignment, grid ref: H3579 5285
- Bunnahone Lough, Crannogs (3), in Lenaghan townland, grid ref: Area of H100 553

== C ==
- Carney Hill, Platform rath, grid ref: H2247 3834
- Carnirk, Rath, grid ref: H0910 5474
- Carrick Church, Church and graveyard, Aghamore townland, grid ref: H0962 5388
- Carrick Lough, Crannog, in Largalinny townland, grid ref: H0949 5398
- Carrickmacflaherty & Drumman, Court tomb: Giant’s Grave, grid ref: H1072 4086
- Carrickmacsparrow, Court tomb: Giant’s Grave, grid ref: H1382 4058
- Carrigan, Souterrain: St Lasser’s Cell, grid ref: H1235 3541
- Castle Caldwell, in Rossbeg townland, grid ref: H0175 6057
- Castle Coole, 17th century house (site of), bawn (site of) and formal garden, grid ref: H2574 4333
- Cavancarragh, Standing stone alignments, grid ref: H2990 4495
- Cavancarragh, Possible megalithic tomb, grid ref: H2997 4496
- Cavantillycormick, Rath, grid ref: H2752 5035
- Cavantillycormick, Dual court tomb: Giant’s Grave, grid ref: H2885 4956
- Clareview, Standing stone, grid ref: H 1705 6132
- Cleenish (Island), Church (site of) and carved stones in graveyard, grid ref: H2550 3964
- Cloghagaddy, Standing stone: Leagaun, grid ref: H4305 3022
- Cloghanagh, Burnt mound, grid ref: H1773 4555
- Cloghcor, Cairn kerb (‘Stone circle’), grid ref: H2954 4055
- Cloghtogle, Wedge tomb: Giant’s Grave or Druid’s Altar, grid ref: H3187 4422
- Cloghtogle, Rath, grid ref: H3171 4417
- Clonbunniagh, Rath, grid ref: H2107 3985
- Clyhannagh, Cup marked stone, grid ref: H1063 3564
- Clyhannagh, Dual court tomb, grid ref: H1069 3548
- Coagh, Barrow, grid ref: H2065 4840
- Concaroe, Rath, grid ref: H1756 4994
- Coolbuck, Standing stone, grid ref: H3093 4394
- Coolbuck, Cairn, grid ref: H3106 4387
- Coolbuck, Wedge tomb: Druid’s Altar and Giant’s Grave, grid ref: H3099 4386
- Coolbuck, Court tomb, grid ref: H3108 4335
- Coolbuck, Rath, grid ref: H3130 4331
- Coolisk, Rath, grid ref: H1953 5886
- Corlatt, Counterscarp rath, grid ref: H4013 2543
- Cornacully, Court tomb: Giant’s Grave, grid ref: H0215 4543
- Cornashee, Mound, cairn, enclosures and henge, grid ref: H3668 3479
- Corraderrybrock, Concentric stone circles, grid ref: H0308 4374
- Corraghy, Sweat house, grid ref: H4646 3320
- Corragunt, Sweat house, grid ref: H5252 3804
- Corraleek, Sweat house, grid ref: H5255 3740
- Corratrasna, Court tomb: Giant’s Grave, grid ref: H2787 2977
- Corratrasna, Fortified manor house, grid ref: H2787 3004
- Corry, Bivallate rath, grid ref: G9278 5831
- Corry, Rath, grid ref: H3160 2158
- Crevenish, Castle, grid ref: H1655 6260
- Crom Castle and garden: Crom Old Castle, grid ref: H3645 2380
- Crom Cruaich, Standing stone, Drumcoo townland, grid ref: H0835 3921
- Crott, Rath, grid ref: H1452 4724
- Cruninish Island, Ring barrow, grid ref: H1225 6239
- Cullen, Counterscarp rath, grid ref: H1701 5016
- Cullentragh, Cashel, grid ref: H0847 3604
- Currin, Bivallate rath, grid ref: H3540 4227

== D ==
- Derrybrusk Church, Church, Fyagh townland, grid ref: H2771 3913
- Derrycallaghan, Counterscarp rath, grid ref: H3010 3550
- Derrygonnelly, Dunbar manor plantation castle, grid ref: H11871 52475
- Derrygonnelly, 17th century church, grid ref: H1208 5240
- Derryharvey, Barrow and burnt cemetery mounds, grid ref: H298 365
- Derrykerrib, Mound, grid ref: H4157 2046
- Derryvary Beg & Newtown, rath with annexe, grid ref: H1316 5008
- Derryvullan, Ecclesiastical site, grid ref: H2743 4038
- Devenish Island, Rath, grid ref: H2215 4768
- Devenish Island, Monastic site (area surrounding the state care monument), grid ref: H224 469
- Digh, Lough, Crannog, in Kinmore townland, grid ref: H3251 3332
- Diviny, Bivallate rath, H2455 6513
- Doagh Glebe, Promontory fort, grid ref: H07090 51350
- Donegall rath, grid ref: H1752 4657
- Doohatty Glebe, Court tomb: Giant’s Grave, grid ref: H1848 3112
- Doon, Two stones with cup-marks and decoration: the Gray Stone, grid ref: H3451 4685
- Doonan, Rath, grid ref: H1913 5706
- Doonan, Rath, grid ref: H1908 5692
- Dresternan, Rath, grid ref: H0977 5440
- Dromore Big, Court tomb: Giant’s Grave, grid ref: H1708 7055
- Drumadillar, Rath, grid ref: H1239 5210
- Drumaran Fort, Rath, Drumaran townland, grid ref: H1857 5819
- Drumary, Rath, grid ref: H1025 5429
- Drumawillan, Round cairn, grid ref: H1203 3870
- Drumbarna, Standing stone, grid ref: H1739 6125
- Drumbrughas, Stone cross, grid ref: H4969 3260
- Drumbrughas East, Fortification – castle, grid ref: H3940 2450
- Drumcorban & Castletown Monea, Crannog, grid ref: H1646 4926
- Drumcramph, Platform rath, grid ref: H3195 3631
- Drumcrin, Rath, grid ref: H2217 5776
- Drumcullion, Standing stone, grid ref: H2488 5113
- Drumcurren, Burnt mound, grid ref: H1693 6584
- Drumgay Lough, Crannogs (4), Conerick, Drumgay, Gortaloughan and Rakeelan Glebe townlands, grid ref: H244 477
- Drummee, Rath, grid ref: H2072 4442
- Drumnarullagh, Standing stone, grid ref: H1822 6400
- Drumsawna More, Rath and bullauns (2), grid ref: H2513 6523
- Drumsillagh, Rath, grid ref: H1969 4669
- Drumsillagh, Rath, grid ref: H1974 4613
- Dumbies (The), Court tomb, in Kilnameel townland, grid ref: H0912 3413

== E ==
- Enaghan, Rath, grid ref: H1713 4986
- Eyes, Lough, Crannogs (6), in townlands of Magonrath, Coolbuck, Derryhoney, Drumlone and Shanco, grid ref: Area of H325 433

== F ==
- Farrancassidy, Mound, grid ref: G9524 5614
- Faugher, Burnt mound, grid ref: H1719 4647
- Formil, Stone circle and alignments, grid ref: H1588 6758

== G ==
- Galloon, Church (site of), graveyard, two cross-shafts and bases, grid ref: H3907 2266
- Glasmullagh, Rath, grid ref: H3227 2237
- Glengesh, Portal tomb: Giant’s Grave, grid ref: H3905 5438
- Glennasheevar, Sweat house, grid ref: H0390 5336
- Golan, Rath, grid ref: H4381 3029
- Gorteen, Barrow and cist (otherwise known as Danes fort), grid ref: H0803 3926
- Gortmaconnell, Platform rath, grid ref: H1305 3413
- Greenan, Wedge tomb: Giant’s Grave, grid ref: H1721 2923

== I ==
- Inishkeen, Church and graveyard, cross-shaft and base, grid ref: H2478 4127
- Inishmacsaint (Island), Penannular enclosure, grid ref: H1653 5428
- Inishmacsaint (Island), Area of 5.84 acres, including former enclosure of monastic site, grid ref: H165 541
- Inishmacsaint (Island), Enclosure: unconsecrated graveyard, grid ref: H1649 5410
- Inishmacsaint (Island), Barrow: Moat of Inis, grid ref: H1637 5440
- Inishmore (or Davy’s Island), Church and enclosure, grid ref: H1741 5933

== K ==
- Keenaghan, Possible megalithic tomb, grid ref: G9634 5951
- Keeran, Wedge tomb: Giant’s Grave, grid ref: H239 6146
- Kevenagh, Rath, grid ref: H3869 2369
- Killadeas graveyard, carved stones (4), in Rockfield townland, grid ref: H2063 5399
- Killesher, Church and graveyard, grid ref: H1222 3583
- Killy Beg, Two megalithic tombs ‘The Giant’s Graves’, grid ref: G9854 5386
- Killy Beg, Wedge tomb: Giant’s Grave, grid ref: G9816 5416
- Killy Beg, Standing stones (2), grid ref: G9821 5423
- Killy Beg, Wedge tomb: Giant’s Grave, grid ref: G9823 5416
- Killy Beg, Standing stones (5), G9827 5424
- Killykeeghan, Cashel, grid ref: H1025 3426
- Killykeeghan, Enclosure and cup and ring marked stone, grid ref: H1074 3411 and H1083 3406
- Killykeeghan, Cashel, grid ref: H1087 3379
- Killykeeghan, Cashel, grid ref: H1094 3421
- Killyvannan, Platform rath, grid ref: H2864 4007
- Kilrooskagh, Megalith: portal tomb, grid ref: H0614 3998
- Kilrooskagh, Cashel, grid ref: H0561 3950
- Kiltierney, Passage tomb and ring cairn, grid ref: H21706267
- Kiltierney and Tullanaglug, Linear earthwork: the Friar’s Walk, grid ref: H214 624 to H217 630
- Kiltierney, Abbey, graveyard and holy well, grid ref: H2220 6266 and H2223 6263
- Kiltierney, Ecclesiastical enclosure (additional area), grid ref: H2220 6265
- Kiltierney, Holy well: Tobernasool, grid ref: H2186 6261
- Kiltierney, Earthwork, grid ref: H2165 6238
- Kiltierney, Barrow, grid ref: H2175 6246
- Kiltober, Mound, holy well and penitential stones, H4285 2230
- Kinarla, Burnt mound, grid ref: H2123 4553
- Kinarla, Burnt mound, grid ref: H2080 4515
- Kinawley Church, in Lismonaghan townland, grid ref: H2297 3080
- Knock Beg, Henge, grid ref: H0813 5045
- Knock More, Cave with rock scribings: ‘Lettered Cave’, grid ref: H0884 5047
- Knockennis, Court tomb: Giant’s Graves, grid ref: H3935 5409
- Knockninny, Dual court tomb, grid ref: H2709 3050

== L ==
- Lanmore, Rath, grid ref: H1403 3480
- Laragh, Platform rath, grid ref: H2435 3147
- Largy, Stone circle (remains of) and standing stone, grid ref: H2929 4668
- Leglehid, Rath, grid ref: G9614 5170
- Legmacaffrey, Fundamental bench mark, grid ref: H4398 2549
- Legnagay Beg, Rath, grid ref: H1116 4380
- Legnagay Beg, Rath, grid ref: H1131 4380
- Lergan, Sweat house, grid ref: G9738 5639
- Letterbailey, Stone circle, grid ref: H3646 5164
- Letterboy, Counterscarp rath, grid ref: H2074 6456
- Letterbreen, Platform rath, grid ref: H1707 4015
- Lisblake, Counterscarp rath, grid ref: H1648 3586
- Lislea, Large hilltop enclosure, grid ref: H4803 2680
- Lismalore, Rath, grid ref: H3927 4103
- Lisnagole, Rath, grid ref: H3489 3649
- Lisnamallard, Henge, grid ref: H4351 3014
- Lissan, Dual court tomb: Druid’s Circle, grid ref: H2758 4702
- Lissan, Standing stone, grid ref: H2675 4674

== M ==
- Macnean Lower, Lough, Mound, grid ref: H1004 3774
- Macnean Lower, Lough, Crannogs (4), grid refs: H0980 3716, H0786 3876, H1141 3705 and H1204 3743
- Magheradunbar, Burial ground/enclosure, grid ref: H19950 46660
- Magherahar, Bivallate rath, grid ref: H1618 5154
- Meenagleragh, Wedge tomb: Giant’s Grave, grid ref: H0235 5100
- Millwood, Platform rath, grid ref: H3202 4119
- Monavreece, Rath, grid ref: H2253 6610
- Monavreece, Mound, grid ref: H2251 6597
- Monea, Cist burial, grid ref: H1561 4932
- Monea Castle, Avenue and gardens, Castletown Monea townland, grid ref: H1647 4937
- Moneendogue, Counterscarp rath, G9301 5729
- Montiaghroe, Stone alignment, grid ref: H1932 6944
- Montiaghroe, Stone circle, grid ref: H1936 6932
- Montiaghroe, Stone alignment, grid ref: H1971 6902
- Mountdrum, Prehistoric ritual landscape, grid ref: Area of H308 432
- Mount Sedborough Lough, Crannog, in Dernaclug and Drumaa townlands, grid ref: H4452 3086
- Moylehid, Passage tomb: Giant’s Grave or Eables’ Knoll Cairn, grid ref: H1499 4161
- Moylehid, Ring cairn, grid ref: H1510 4154
- Moynaghan South, Ring barrow, grid ref: H2041 5528
- Mullaghbane, Counterscarp rath, grid ref: H0941 3784
- Mullaghbane, Rath, grid ref: H0936 3737
- Mullaghsillogagh, Raths (2), grid ref: H4269 5073 and H4287 5040
- Mullan, Sweat house, grid ref: H0429 4091
- Mullan and Meenawargy, Cashel and mass rock: Cashelbane, grid ref: H0448 4121
- Mullanacaw, Earthwork, grid ref: H2190 4380
- Mullies, Counterscarp rath, grid ref: H1813 5790
- Mullyknock, Barrow, grid ref: H3244 4589

== R ==
- Rahallan, Bivallate rath, grid ref: H1498 3978
- Rahalton, Rath, grid ref: H1386 5364
- Rahalton and Corbystown, Rath, grid ref: H1421 5394
- Ratoran, Stone alignment, grid ref: H3529 4655
- Reyfad, Decorated stones, grid ref: H1120 4615
- Ring Burnt mound/cooking place, grid ref: H2745 3855
- Roosky, Rath, grid ref: H1361 5271
- Ross Lough, Crannog, in Ross townland, grid ref: H1429 4677
- Rossinure Beg, Court tomb: Giant’s Grave, grid ref: H0691 5053
- Rossinure More, Court tomb: Giant’s Grave, grid ref: H0771 5039
- Rossmore, Round cairn: Black Fort, grid ref: H0149 58863
- Rossorry, Rectangular enclosure, grid ref: H2318 4288
- Rossorry, Ecclesiastical site, grid ref: H2311 4293
- Rushin, Church: Templerushin at Holywell, grid ref: H0757 3967

== S ==
- Scandally, Raths (2), grid refs: H1433 5142 and H1508 5115
- Shean, Rath, grid ref: H0912 5766
- Sheebeg, Henge, rath and barrow, grid ref: Area of H369 341
- Sheemuldoon, Wedge tomb: Giant’s Grave, grid ref: H2659 6261
- Skaghlea Cairn, Court tomb, Dog Little townland, grid ref: H0198 5070
- Slattinagh and Frevagh, Monastic site with cross-shaft and base: Kilcoo, grid ref: Area of G967 465
- Slisgarrow, Standing stones (3), H0121 9512

== T ==
- Tattycam Lough, Crannog, in Rateen and Tattycam townlands, grid ref: H4405 3100
- Tawnydorragh, Court tomb: Giant’s Grave, grid ref: 1911 7308
- Teesnaghtan, Cross-inscribed standing stone and 2 cairns, grid ref: H1925 3064
- Templemoyle, Church and enclosure, Gortahurk West townland, grid ref: H1315 3960
- Templenaffrin, Church, graveyard and enclosure, grid ref: H1007 3881
- Tievealough, Church, grid ref: G9777 5984
- Tiraltan, Rath, grid ref: H3318 4559
- Toneel North, Cross-shaft and base: Boho Cross, grid ref: H1165 4618
- Tonyloman, Rath, grid ref: H2329 3806
- Tonyvarnog, Cashel, H2600 2893
- Topped Mountain or Mullyknock, Round cairn, H3114 4575
- Trannish (Island), Artillery fort, grid ref: H3284 2967
- Treel, Rath, grid ref: H1246 4350
- Tullanaglug and Kiltierney, Linear earthwork: the Friar’s Walk, grid ref: H214 624 to H217 630
- Tullanaglug, Barrows (2) and section of Friar’s Walk, grid ref: H2152 6260
- Tully, Court tomb, grid ref: H1257 5615
- Tully, Abbey (traditional site), grid ref: H1232 5689
- Tullycallrick, Counterscarp rath, H2106 6228
- Tullykelter Castle, castle, Tullykelter townland, grid ref: H1550 4830
- Tullymargy, Rath pair, grid refs: H1647 4798 and H1650 4792

== W ==
- White Island, Rath, earthwork and area surrounding the state care monument, grid ref: H1753 6000
