= Zero Theory =

Zero Theory, Zero Theorem, Zero Conjecture, Zero Law or similar, may mean:

- X&Y, Coldplay's third album, once rumored to be titled Zero Theory
- The Zero Theorem, a science fiction film directed by Terry Gilliam

== See also ==
- List of zero terms
