= Francis Skuce =

Irish Anglican priest

Francis John Leonard Skuce (1926–1982) was an Irish Anglican priest: he was Archdeacon of Clogher from 1973 until his death.

Skuce was educated at Trinity College, Dublin and ordained in 1951. After a curacy at Warrenpoint he was the incumbent at Inishmacsaint from 1953 until his death.
