= Aghamore (disambiguation) =

Aghamore is a village in County Leitrim, Ireland

Aghamore may also refer to:

== Places ==
Northern Ireland

- Aghamore, County Fermanagh, a townland in the civil parish of Inishmacsaint
- Aghamore, County Tyrone, a townland in the civil parish of Termonamongan

Republic of Ireland

- Aghamore, Croghan, a townland in the barony of Lower Philipstown, County Offaly
- Aghamore, Killucan, a townland in the barony of Farbill, County Westmeath
- Aghamore, Kilbeggan, a townland in the barony of Moycashel, County Westmeath
- Aghamore, Kilbride, a townland in the barony of Kilcoursey, County Offaly
- Aghamore, County Mayo, a village and parish in County Mayo
  - Aghamore GAA, a Gaelic Athletic Association club in the parish of Aghamore, just outside Knock village in County Mayo
