= White Island, County Fermanagh =

Island in County Fermanagh, Northern Ireland

Coordinates: 54.48879°N 7.73618°W

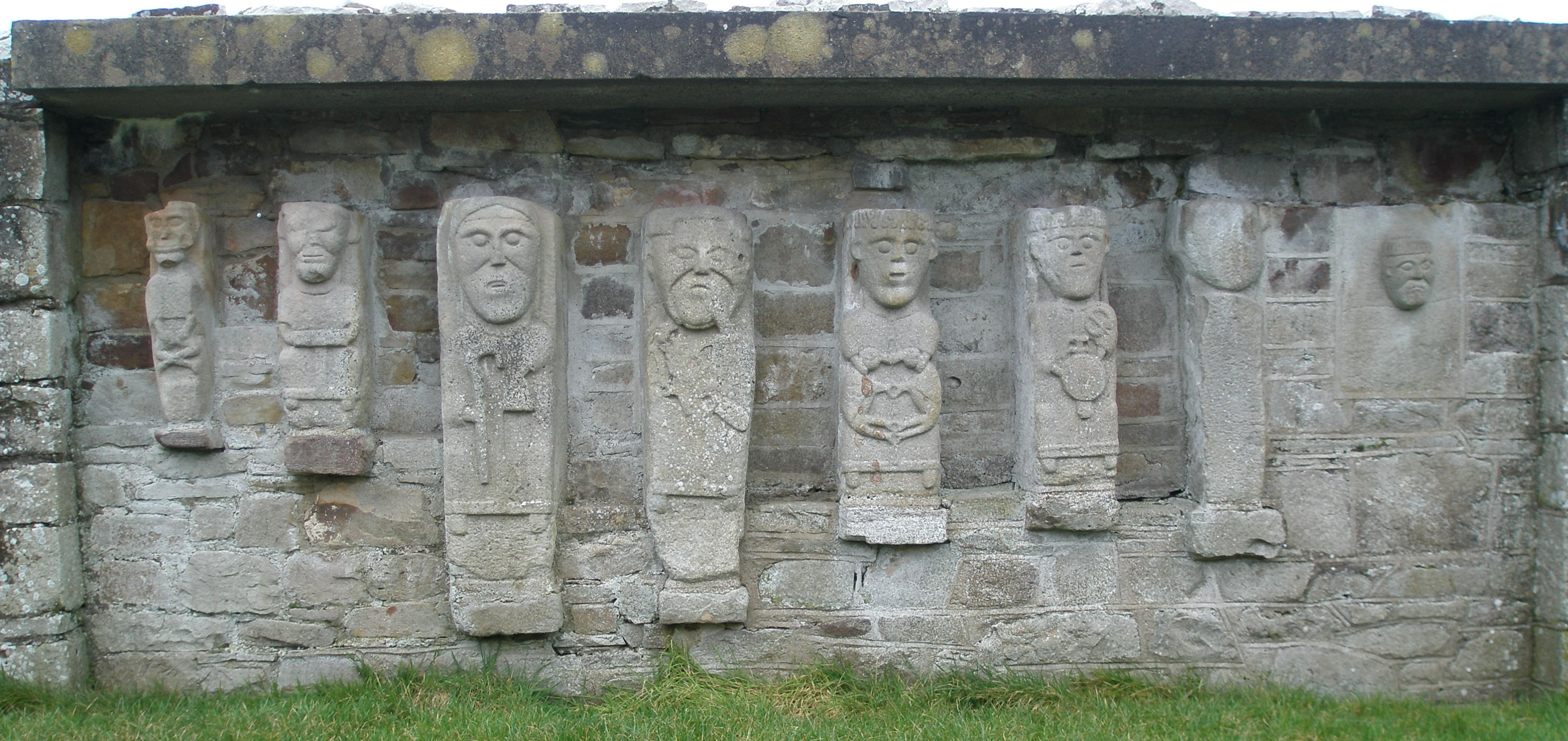
View of the 11th century White Island stone figures

White Island is an island in Lower Lough Erne, County Fermanagh, Northern Ireland. It is situated in Castle Archdale Bay off the east shore of Lower Lough Erne. The ruins of an ancient church are found near the shore, built on the site of an earlier monastic settlement. It still has an intact (restored) arched Romanesque doorway. The Church and carved figures are State Care Historic Monuments sited in the townland of White Island, in Fermanagh and Omagh District Council area.

The rath, earthwork, and area surrounding the state care monument are Scheduled Historic Monuments, at grid ref: H1753 6000. The island is accessed by ferry from the marina in Castle Archdale Country Park, near Irvinestown.

== Features ==
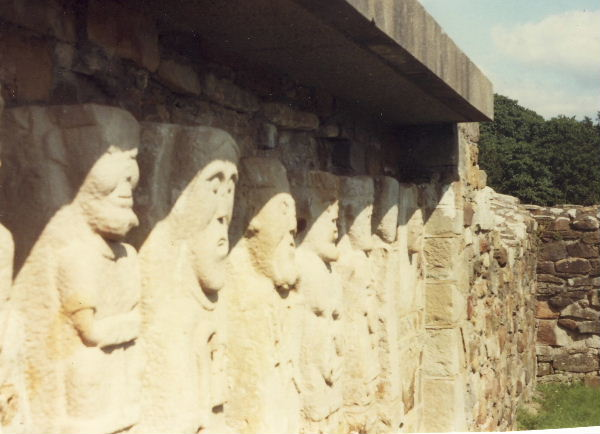
White Island figures, Lough Erne

The ruined church on the island has a reconstructed plain Romanesque doorway. Secured to the north side of the south wall are eight carvings (seven figures and one head) built into the masonry of the church. Most of the figures were carved wearing the long tunics of churchmen. They are all carved in quartzite and were probably constructed between 800 and 1000 AD, and were later used as building stones in the church before being uncovered in recent centuries.

The Australian historian Helen Hickey identified them as three pairs of caryatids (architectural supports). Each pair a different height and suggests that because of the sockets on the top of their heads that they may have supported a pulpit or preaching chair of an earlier possible wooden church. One popular theory is that the figures illustrate an episode in the life of St. Patrick.

There are eight figures in all, including an uncarved figure, suggesting the figures were carved on-site, and a frowning face, or "mask". From left to right, the figures are as follows:

- The first figure is presumed to be a Sheela na Gig - a statue of a grinning, naked female figure with its hands resting on its thighs. However the gender of the figure cannot be completely discerned from the carving, due to the lack of detail. Known to archaeologists as an 'exhibitionist figure', 'Sheelas' are common throughout Ireland as a supposedly magical creature, and are often found over church doorways and windows.
- The second figure is a seated figure, presumed to represent a Christ figure. It is similar to a representation of a seated Christ in the Book of Kells, supporting Hickey's view that the figures supported an Ambro (lectern or pulpit used by clergy to proclaim the Gospel).
- The third figure is supposedly an abbot, or similarly highly ranking clerical figure. It is hooded and holding a crook (Crozier) and a bell.
- The fourth figure is possibly David with hand pointing to his mouth. This is a reference to David's role as a psalmist. This figure is shown to be holding a scroll, and has a pouch hanging from its belt.
- The fifth and sixth figures were identified by Hickey as 'Christ with Griffins' and 'Christ the warrior with sword & shield', respectively. The sixth figure is shown to be wearing a penannular brooch of 9th- or 10th-century fashion.
- The seventh figure is uncarved, and thus blank, and the eighth figure is a frowning head.

An inscribed cross-carved stone was discovered built into the wall around the church.

== See also ==
- List of archaeological sites in County Fermanagh

== Sources ==
- Kingsley Porter, Arthur. "A Sculpture at Tandragee". The Burlington Magazine for Connoisseurs, volume 65, number 380, 1934. JSTOR 865867
- Lethbridge, T.C. "Christian Saints or Pagan Gods? The Lough Erne Figures". The Journal of the Royal Anthropological Institute of Great Britain and Ireland, volume 83, number. 2, July - December 1953. JSTOR 2844030
