= Bigwood =

Bigwood is an English surname. Notable people with the surname include:

- Alfred Bigwood (1857–1940), English cricketer
- Fiona Bigwood (born 1976), British equestrian
- James Bigwood (1839–1919), English manufacturer and politician
- Jessie Bigwood (1874–1953), American lawyer
