= Carrick Church =

Structure in Fermanagh, Northern Ireland

Coordinates: 54.420°N 7.822°W

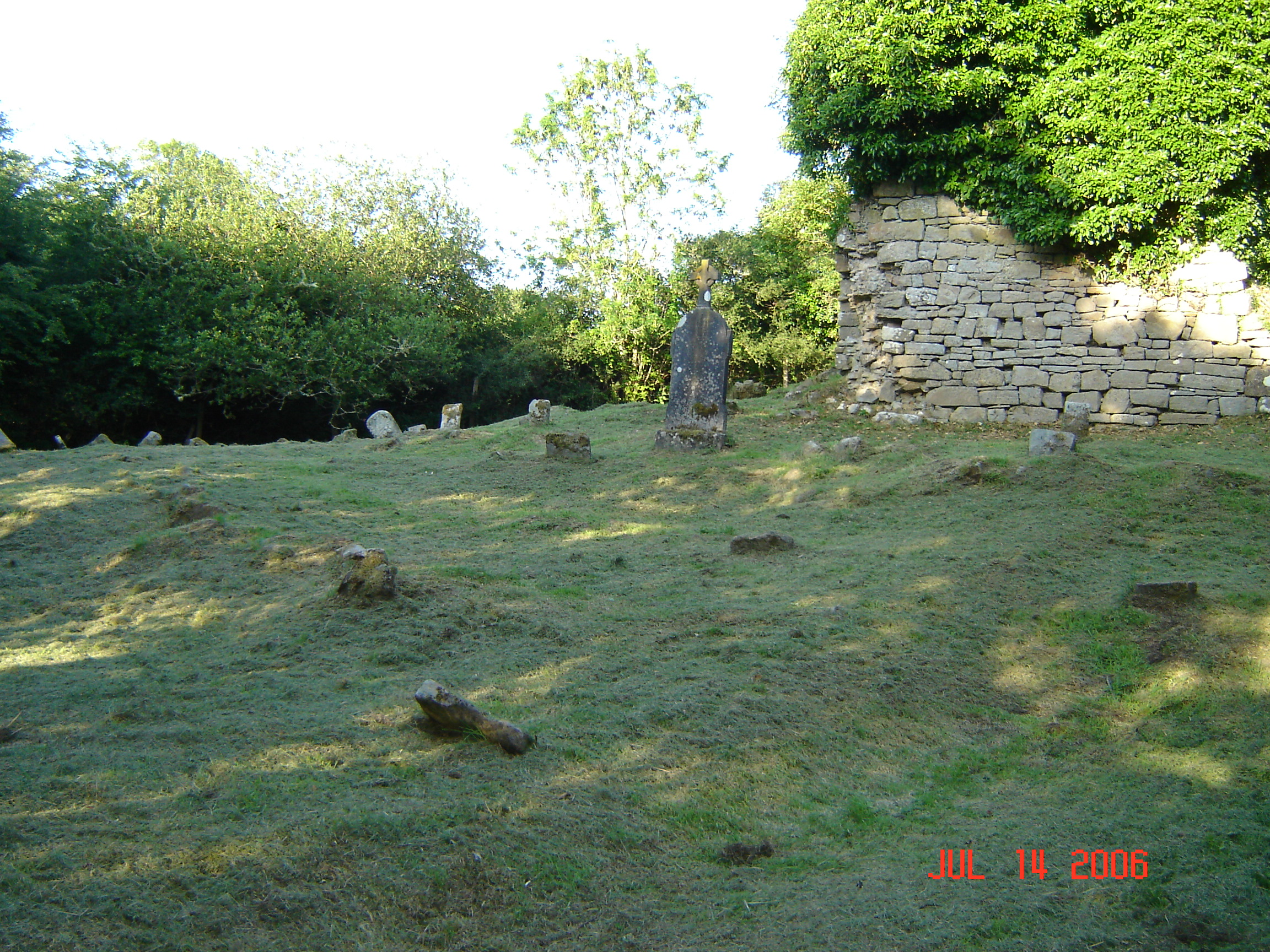

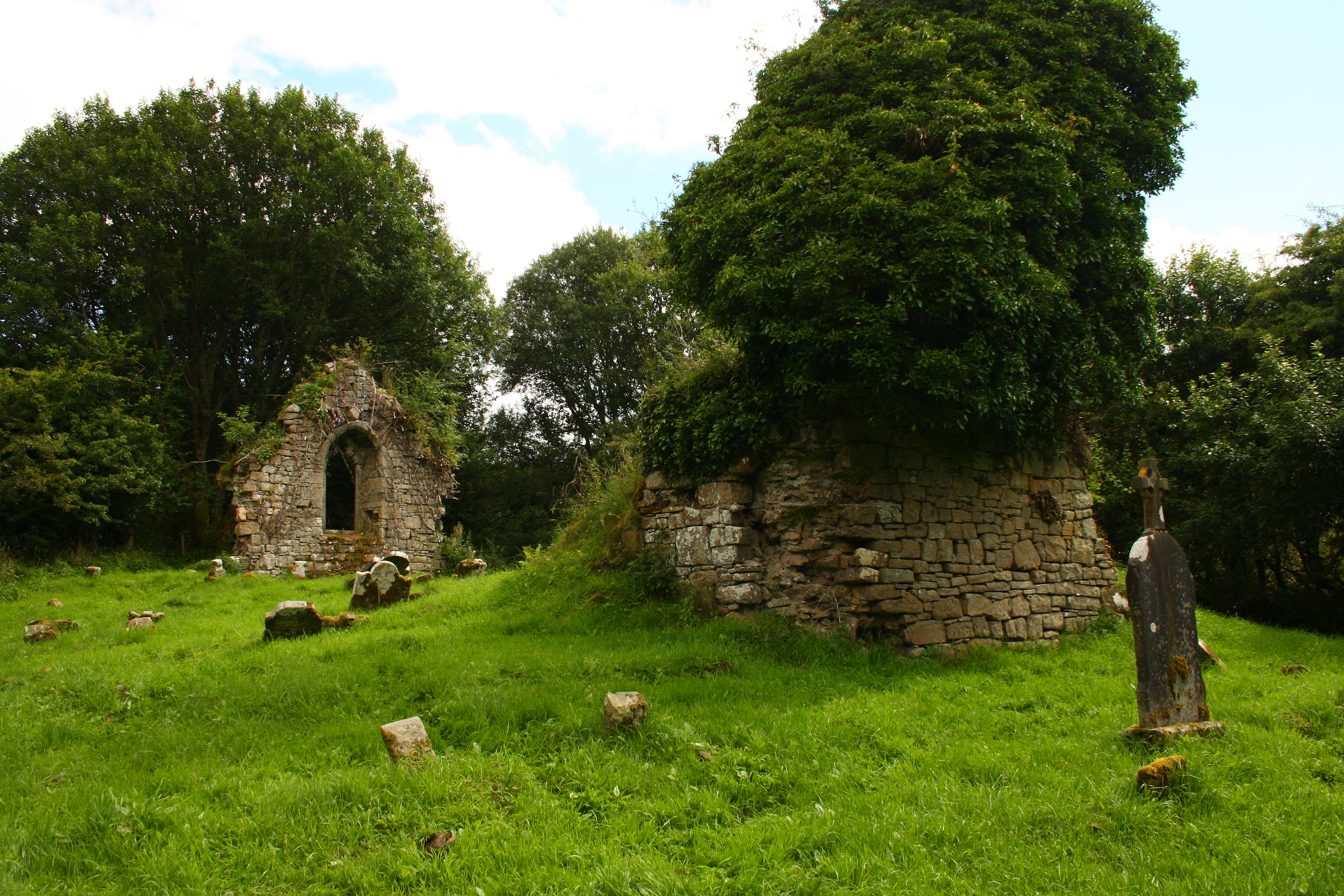
Carrick Church, Derrygonnelly, August '12

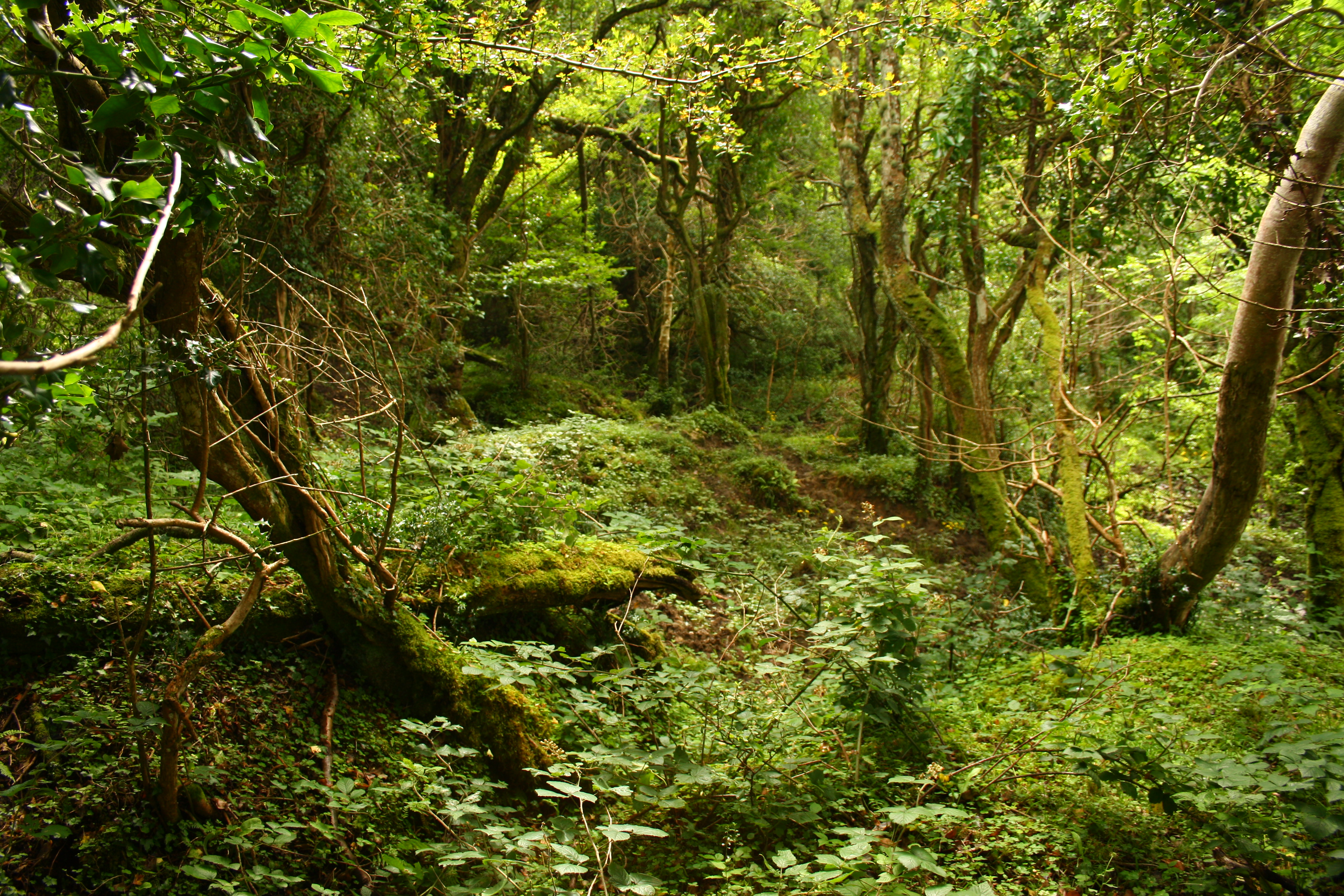
Carrick Church 6

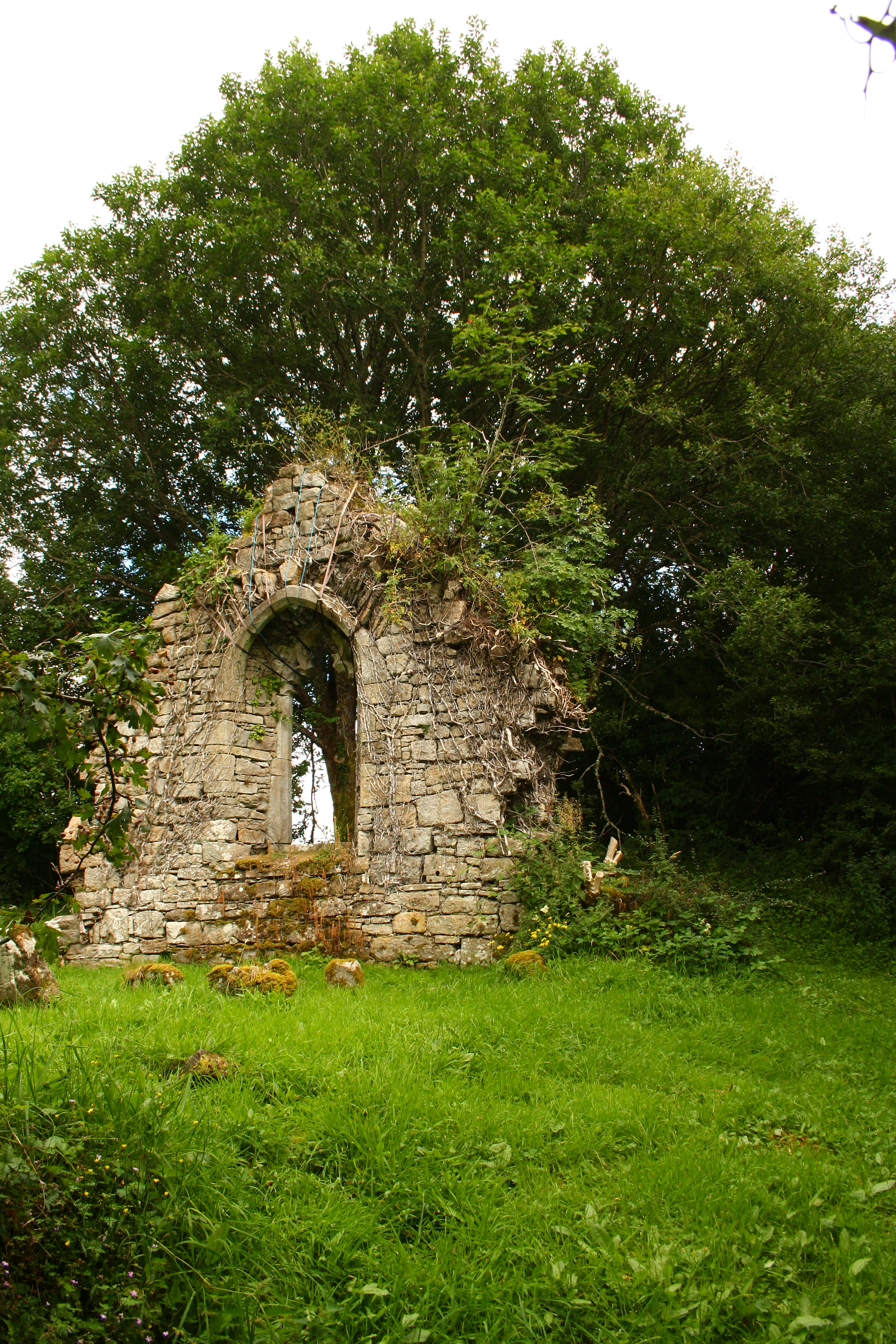
Carrick Church 4

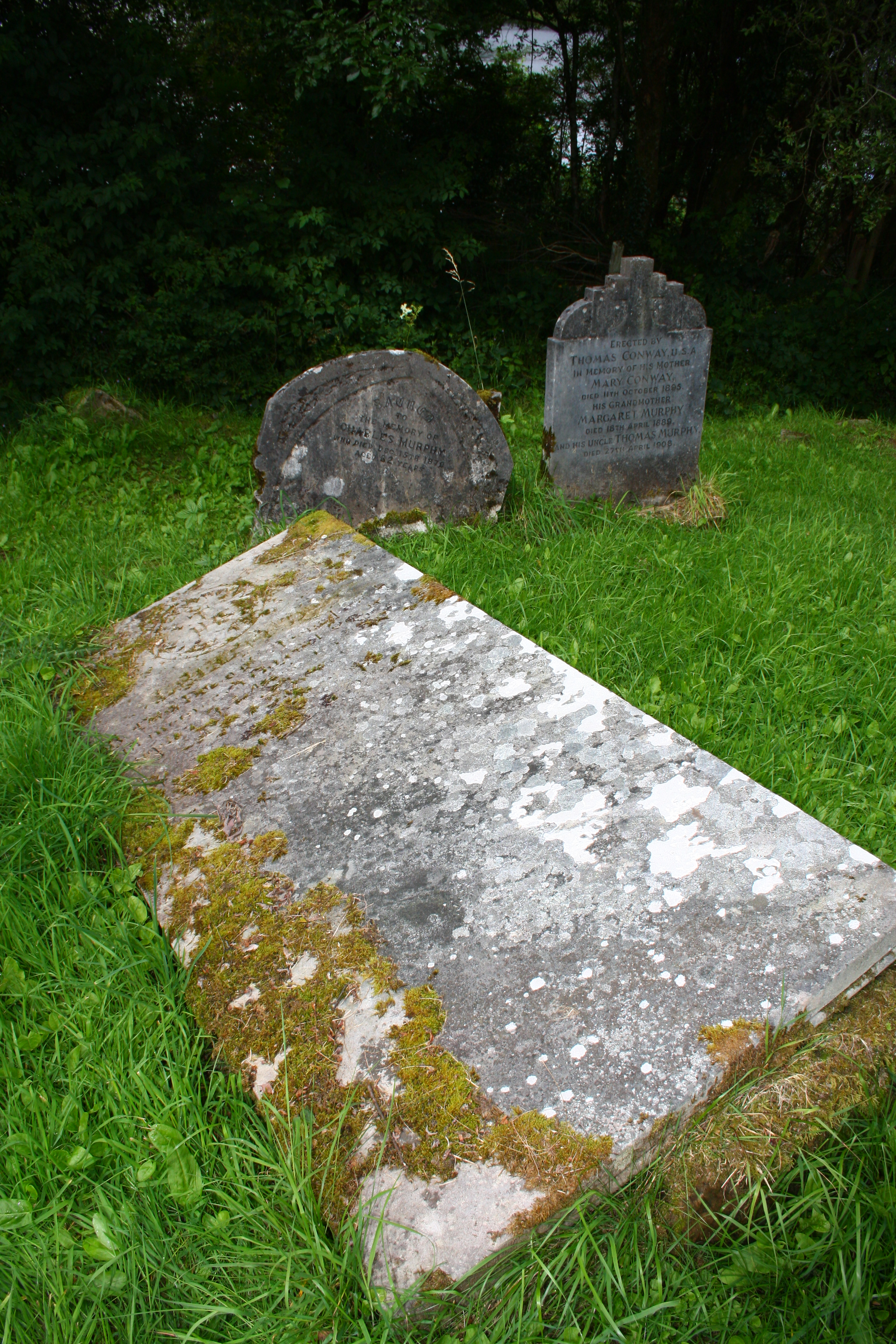
Carrick Church 3

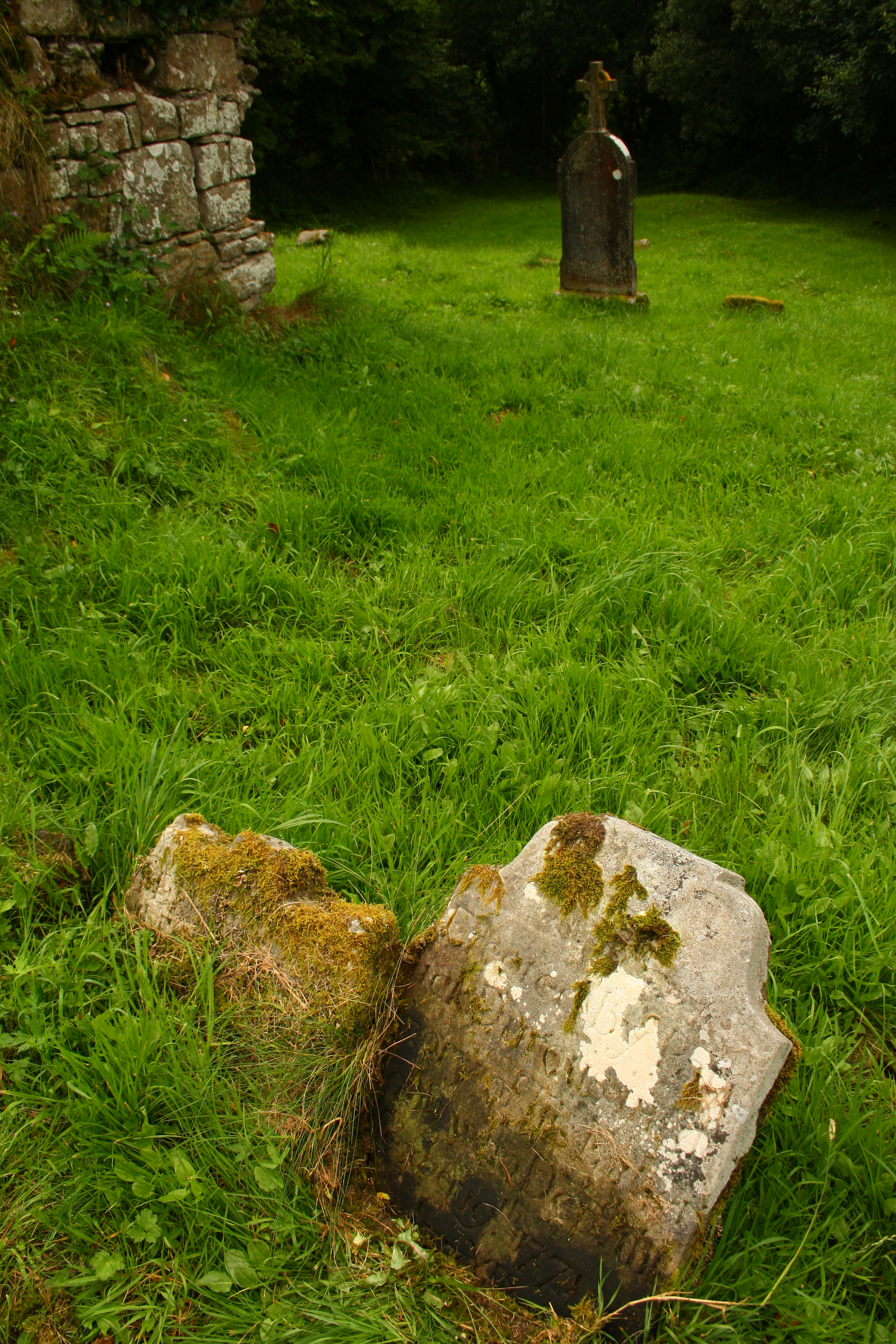
Carrick Church 2

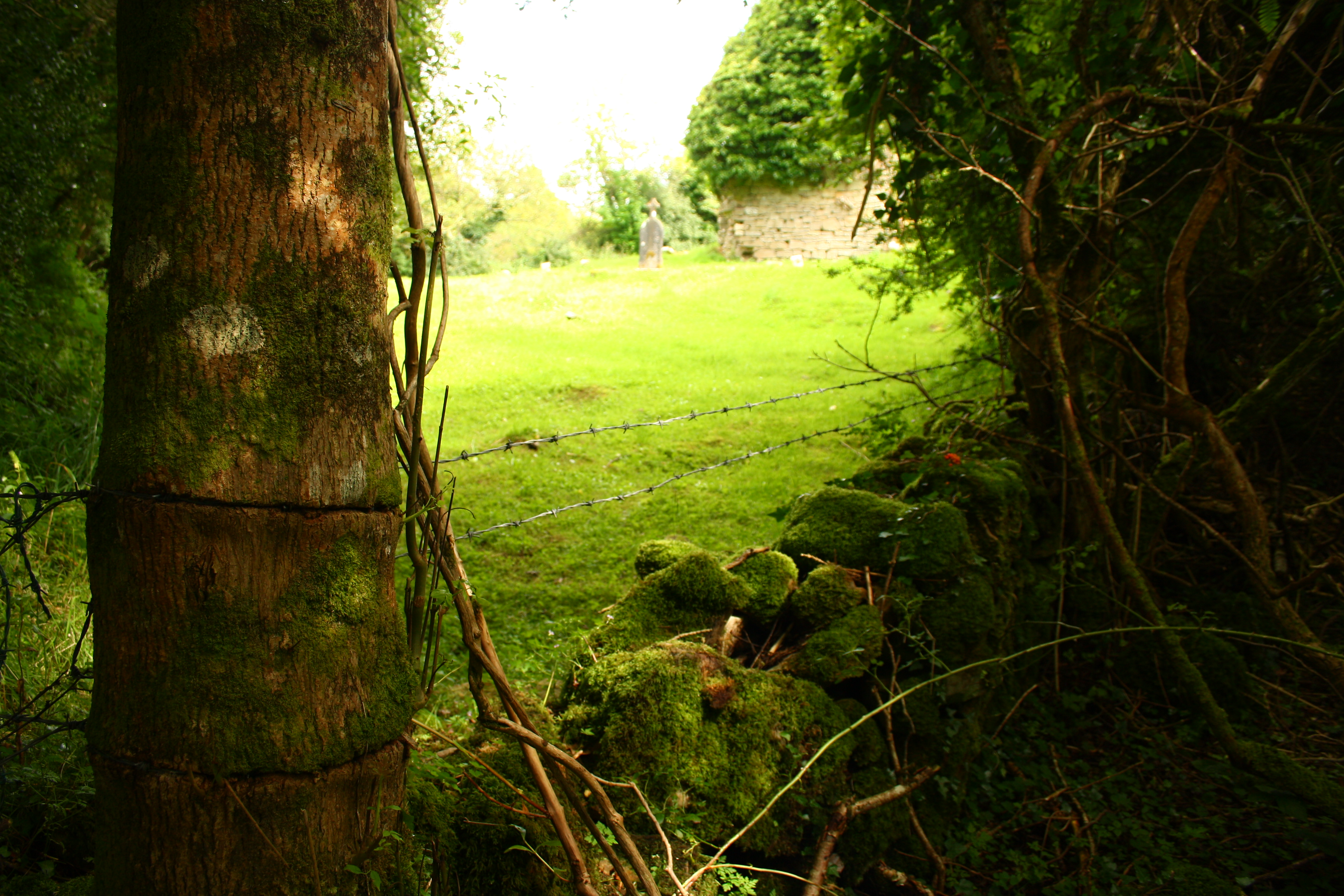
Carrick Church 1

Situated in Fermanagh, Northern Ireland, Carrick Church (Teampall Carraig) is approximately one mile to the north-west of the village of Derrygonnelly, on the shore of Carrick Lough. The Church is a late medieval structure built by the then Baron Gilbert O'Flanagan II, and his wife Margaret in 1483 in 'Honour of God and Mary'. Gilbert, son of Cormac, became chief in 1488. The O'Flanagan sept, who supplied many of the clergy for both Devenish and Inishmacsaint, were the chieftains of Tuatha Rátha. The territory of Tuatha Rátha covered approximately the area which is known today as the Barony of Magheraboy and their stronghold was situated at Baile Uí Fhlanagain in the townland of Aghamore on the shores of Carrick Lake.

Much trouble plagued the descendants of O'Flanagan and the Annals of Ulster record that in 1528 Gilleece O'Flanagan and his son Turlough were both murdered in the chapel, on the same day, by Patrick O'Flanagan. Gilbert II may have built a church at Aghamore (the Great Field) as a private chapel but it raises the question; did he have a difference with his kinsman who was Prior on Inishmacsaint or did he build it for prestige? Gilbert II died in 1496 and when his wife Margaret, who was a daughter of the ruling house of the Maguires of Fermanagh, died, she was buried at the Abbey in Donegal.

Carrick Church may have existed as a place of worship for the local people until penal times as there is no record of any other Roman Catholic place of worship in the area. Inishmacsaint church was taken over by the planters as Hume, the local landlord, did not build a church until 1688 at Drumenag. Despite the condition of the dangerous ruins the graveyard was utilized by the locals until around 1930. Many gravestones litter the grounds and some late 18th century inscriptions are still visible on the markers.

Nearby to this ruin, there is a well by the name of Tobarnasuil, from the Irish Tobar na Súil, meaning "well of the eyes". Its water is said to have healing powers to cure ailments of the eye.

Carrick Church and graveyard, in Aghamore townland, grid ref: H0962 5388, are Scheduled Historic Monuments. In December 2012 work, overseen by the Ulster Archaeological Heritage Society, was completed to secure the deteriorated ruins and prevent further collapse.

== See also ==
- List of archaeological sites in County Fermanagh
