= Tullykelter Castle =

Castle in County Fermanagh, Northern Ireland

Coordinates: 54.3830°N 7.7620°W

Tullykelter Castle is a castle located in Northern Ireland. In 1616 Archbishop Malcolm Hamilton of Monea Castle granted land for the castle to James Somerville, and his wife Elizabeth, believed to be the daughter of Thomas Hamilton of Brimhill. They had a daughter who married the Archbishop's third son Captain John.

== Architecture ==
Tullykelter (from the Irish Tulaigh Chealtchair) is in a townland in the Monea area carrying its name on a hilltop about a mile southwest of Monea Castle in County Fermanagh, Northern Ireland. Tullykelter Castle is now in ruins with heavy overgrowth which makes inspection very difficult. It has two main floors 60 by 20 feet on the inside.

== James and Elizabeth (Hamilton) Somerville ==
James Somerville was of Cambusnethan in Ayrshire, Scotland. James and Elizabeth by leasing land to the native Irish broke the agreement of land ownership, which caused the land which he leased to be forfeited. James and Elizabeth took the Oath of Supremacy, but a lessee, Daniel Elliot, who was given the position of "caulter" (purchaser-accountant, with the title of the Tullycaulter of Tullykelter) did not take the Oath of Allegiance, a type of loyalty oath for his position.
