= Aghanaglack =

Townland in County Fermanagh, Northern Ireland

- Townland
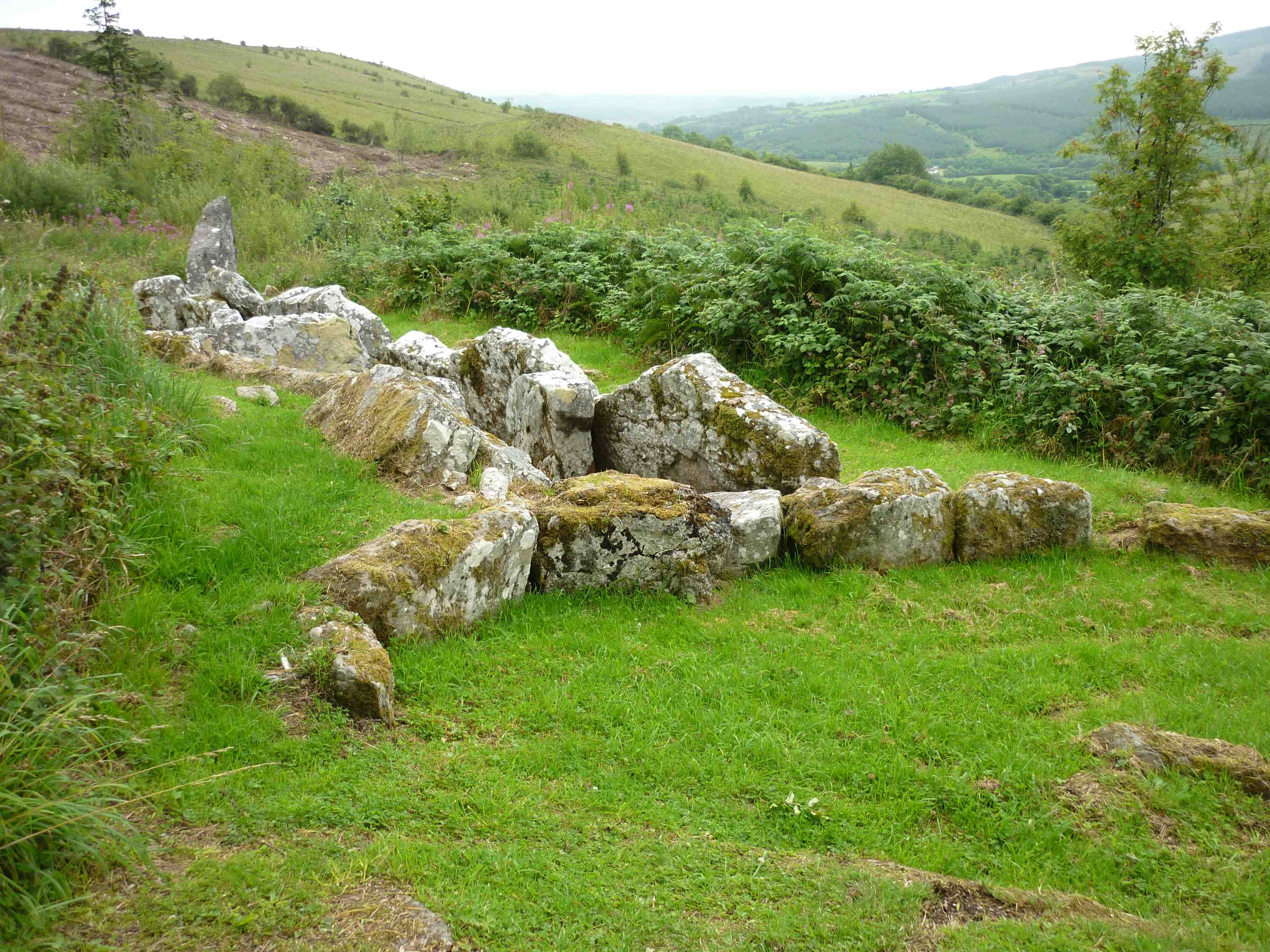
- Dual court tomb at Aghanaglack

- Location within Northern Ireland
- Coordinates: 54.337°N 7.840°W
- Country: United Kingdom
- Province: Northern Ireland
- County: County Fermanagh
- Civil parish: Boho

Aghanaglack or Aghnaglack (from Irish Achadh na Glaice 'field of the hollow'), is a townland in County Fermanagh, Northern Ireland. It is situated in the civil parish of Boho, as well as Fermanagh and Omagh district.

== Etymology ==
Aghanaglack derives from the Irish achadh na glaice, meaning "field of the hollow". Alternative spellings of this name recorded over the centuries include:

- Aghneglack (1609)
- Aghonaglacky (1611)
- Agheneglackie (1624)
- Aghneglacke (1630)
- Aghanlaike (1659)
- Glack, Glac or Glac Mhanchach
- Aghonaglacky
- Aghanaglach.

== History ==
The Reverend John Nixon states in his diary, that during the period of the Plantation, the Chief of the O’Flanagans (Hugh III) whose main residence was at Aghamore on the shore of Carrick Lough, received a grant of land at Glack in Boho. Some of the ruling sept of the O’Flanagans eventually settled in Austria.

== Giants Double Court Tomb ==
In 1938 a "double court tomb" (Grid ref:H0981 4358)was excavated in the townland of Aghanaglack by Prof. Oliver Davies (4000–2000 BC). The tomb is in a clearing in Ballintempo Forest at an altitude of 222 m (728 ft) (Grid ref: H097 435). The twin galleries of the tomb are aligned east-west, one of which has a length of 4 metres, terminating in a 2-metre-tall stone and the other about 1 metre ending in the bedrock. The site was thought to have been disturbed by previous excavations; some of the stones used for building;the actual cairn being used as a pigsty. The tomb was found to contain Bronze Age and Stone Age items, pots, arrowheads and the remains of two children some of which can be found on display at the Enniskillen museum.

== Medieval High Cross Shaft ==
The medieval cross shaft (Grid ref: H1083 4351) is approximately 9 ft tall and includes the intact mortice for the cross head. This is a Scheduled Historic Monument.

== Aghnaglack Cave ==
This cave is a provisional Area of Special Scientific Interest and Scheduled Historic Monument because of its use as a Souterrain (grid ref: H1085 4357).

== Stone Circle with Cupmark and Cashel ==
A Scheduled Ancient Monument (FER210-038), this site overlooks Mullylusty at the head of the Lurgan river (grid ref: H1113 4361).

== Mass Rock ==
This Mass Rock is located in the sub-townland of Carrickanalter.

== See also ==
- List of archaeological sites in County Fermanagh
- Caves of the Tullybrack and Belmore hills
