= Alfred Bigwood =

English cricketer

Personal information
- Full name: Alfred Bigwood
- Born: 3 August 1857; Mortlake, Surrey, England
- Died: 12 September 1940 (aged 83); Putney, London, England
- Batting: Right-handed
- Bowling: Unknown-arm roundarm slow

Domestic team information
- Years: Team
- 1878: Surrey

Career statistics
Competition	First-class
Matches	1
Runs scored	5
Batting average	5.00
100s/50s	–/–
Top score	4
Balls bowled	–
Wickets	–
Bowling average	–
5 wickets in innings	–
10 wickets in match	–
Best bowling	–
Catches/stumpings	2/–
- Source: Cricinfo, 23 June 2012

Alfred Bigwood (3 August 1857 – 12 September 1940) was an English cricketer. Bigwood was a right-handed batsman who bowled roundarm slow, though which he arm he bowled with is also unknown. He was born at Mortlake, Surrey.

Bigwood made a single first-class appearance for Surrey against Middlesex in 1878 at Lord's. Middlesex won the toss and elected to bat, making 105 all out. Surrey responded in their first-innings by making 84 all out, with Bigwood for 4 runs by Robert Henderson. Middlesex then made 167 all out in their second-innings, leaving Surrey with a target of 189 for victory. However, Surrey could only manage to make 75 all out, with Bigwood ending the innings not out on a single run. Middlesex won the match by 113 runs. This was his only major appearance for Surrey.

He died at Putney, London, on 12 September 1940.
