= Rushin =

Rushin is a surname. Notable people with the surname include:

- Bruce Rushin, British art teacher and coin designer
- Kate Rushin (born 1951), black lesbian poet
- Pat Rushin (born 1953), American screenwriter
- Steve Rushin (born 1966), American journalist, sportswriter, and novelist
