= The Zero Theorem =

2013 film by Terry Gilliam

- UK theatrical release poster
- Directed by: Terry Gilliam
- Written by: Pat Rushin
- Produced by: Nicolas Chartier; Dean Zanuck
- Starring: Christoph Waltz; David Thewlis; Mélanie Thierry; Lucas Hedges; Matt Damon
- Cinematography: Nicola Pecorini
- Edited by: Mick Audsley
- Music by: George Fenton
- Production companies: MediaPro Studios; Voltage Pictures; Zanuck Independent; A&E Productions
- Distributed by: Sony Pictures Releasing International (through Stage 6 Films, United Kingdom); Le Pacte (France)
- Release dates: 2 September 2013 (Venice); 14 March 2014 (United Kingdom)
- Running time: 106 minutes
- Countries: United Kingdom; Romania; France
- Languages: English; Romanian
- Budget: $8.5–13.5 million
- Box office: $1.4 million

The Zero Theorem is a 2013 science fiction film directed by Terry Gilliam, starring Christoph Waltz, David Thewlis, Mélanie Thierry and Lucas Hedges. Written by Pat Rushin, the story is about Qohen Leth (Waltz), a reclusive computer genius tasked with solving a formula that will determine whether life holds meaning. The film began production in October 2012.

Gilliam has given conflicting statements about whether The Zero Theorem is considered the third part of a satirical dystopian trilogy ("Orwellian triptych") that began with 1985's Brazil and continued with 1995's 12 Monkeys.

== Plot ==
In the bizarre cyberpunk future of the mid-21st century, Qohen Leth, an eccentric and reclusive programmer who refers to himself in the plural, works crunching "entities" for the ontological research division of a large company called Mancom. He does not like having to leave the quiet, fire-damaged church in which he lives to travel the bright, crowded, and polluted streets and work in a noisy office and fears missing a mysterious phone call he has been expecting for years, so he requests disability leave or permission to work from home. Though he points to the fact that all of his hair has fallen out as evidence he is dying, three company doctors determine he is physically healthy but they do require he start sessions with Dr. Shrink-Rom, an AI therapist.

Qohen attends a party thrown by his supervisor, Joby, so he can talk to Management, their boss. He requests permission to work from home, saying he would be more productive and mentioning his call, which he says he hopes will provide his life with a purpose. Management at first calls Qohen "insane" but later says he has a special project for Qohen that he thinks might prove mutually beneficial.

The project is the "Zero Theorem", an extremely complex mathematical formula with a reputation for quickly exhausting or killing anyone who tries to solve it. Qohen spends months locked in his home working on it and becomes increasingly deranged, as the "entities refuse to remain crunched" and Mancom's demands for processed data are relentless. In frustration, he smashes his work station with a hammer, destroying it permanently.

Joby comes by to check on Qohen and says he knows someone he thinks can help. He sends over Bainsley, a young woman Qohen had met at Joby's party, who knocks on Qohen's door dressed in a latex nurse's uniform. She tidies the place up a bit and they talk, and Qohen confides that the call he is waiting for is a call-back from someone he once accidentally hung up on who he believes will tell him the meaning of life. Saying she will be right back, Bainsley leaves.

Bob, the teenage son of Management, visits Qohen to repair his computer. Qohen says he has decided to quit but Bob tells him Management is not done with him, so he cannot. Ambivalent toward his father, Bob reveals that Bainsley was paid to spend time with Qohen and then offers to get Qohen his call, if he agrees to continue to work on the Zero Theorem. When Bainsley returns, she gives Qohen an advanced VR suit, and they arrange to meet up through her website. Qohen clicks on a link and finds himself, with hair, on a virtual beach with Bainsley. He is concerned that it is not real but she assures him it is "better than real" and they end up kissing.

The next day, Bob visits Qohen again. He explains that proving the Zero Theorem will prove life is meaningless, which Qohen does not want to believe. Unable to focus on work, he virtually meets with Bainsley again. He is troubled that the Sun never sets on her beach, so she invites him to imagine an environment for them to inhabit, and he ends up sending them to a vortex around a black hole that has been haunting his dreams. Back on the beach, Bainsley comforts Qohen and they embrace, but when he suggests they stay in the virtual world together and denounces Management, he is forcefully disconnected from the system and his VR suit is remotely destructed. When Qohen goes to Bainsley's website at an unplanned time, he discovers her performing as a webcam stripper and she logs off abruptly upon noticing his presence. He later returns to the site and finds his IP address has been blacklisted, preventing him from accessing the site.

Weeks later, Bob returns with Qohen's VR suit, which he says he has turned into a "prototype soul-searching device". Bob gets Dr. Shrink-Rom to confirm that the phone call Qohen is waiting for is a delusion but says the upgraded suit has the ability to connect Qohen with his soul, assuming he has one. Bainsley arrives and says that, while she initially agreed to seduce Qohen because Joby said she could keep her VR suit if she did so, she developed real feelings for Qohen. She offers to run away with him but Qohen turns her down. He and Bob take a break from work and go to a park, where Qohen reveals he was once married.

Back at the church, Bob's health declines rapidly, and Qohen cares for him. Once Bob is asleep, Qohen finds and smashes the cameras Management hid throughout the building. Two of Management's employees break in and take Bob away and, later, Joby drops by to blame Qohen for getting him fired. Once alone, Qohen dons his upgraded VR suit and tries to connect to his computer but there is a problem and he is shocked.

Finding himself in front of the Neural Net Mainframe, a massive supercomputer that is the destination for all of the entities crunched by the employees of Mancom, Qohen is greeted by Management, who tells him Bob has been hospitalized due to a chronic illness. Qohen asks if Management is real or just in his mind and is told that it does not matter, as he is now part of the Neural Net. He asks what the point of his life is, but Management says he does not know, as Mancom is still crunching the data. Management then explains that he believes that the universe came from, exists in, and will eventually return to nothing but chaos. The ultimate goal of the Zero Theorem was to prove, and then profit from, the universe’s constant chaotic state. Qohen was chosen to work on the Zero Theorem because his obsession with receiving his phone call demonstrated that he was a man of faith, which represented the antithesis of Management's project. Unfortunately, Management says, the faith that led Qohen to spend his life waiting for the phone call he believed would give his life meaning caused him to live a meaningless life.

After saying he no longer requires Qohen's services, Management disappears. Qohen destroys the Neural Net, which blows open, revealing the black hole vortex from his nightmare inside, though now there are countless pictures, including one of Bainsley, swirling toward the center. He begins to walk away, but turns back and smiling, jumps into the vortex. Alone on the virtual beach, a calm, naked (and still-bald) Qohen stands looking out to sea. He goes over to where he had a picnic with Bainsley and picks her bikini top up off the sand. A beach ball floats by, and he throws it up in the air a few times before he does the same thing with the Sun, which then sets. Mixed in with the music as the credits begin, Bainsley can be heard calling Qohen's name and laughing.

== Cast ==
- Christoph Waltz as Qohen Leth:

A loner computer programmer and mathematician searching for the meaning of life. The script just called for Qohen to be bald, but Gilliam insisted Waltz also shave his eyebrows, both to challenge his acting and to visually differentiate Qohen from Waltz's previous roles. Ewan McGregor and Billy Bob Thornton were attached to the part at different stages of pre-production.

- David Thewlis as Joby
- Mélanie Thierry as Bainsley:

A femme fatale who enters Qohen's life. Gilliam resisted pressure to cast an established American actress, wanting someone whom few viewers had seen. He stated that "the difference is, in particular the American actresses, they all look similar, they're all the same shape, they're all trimmed down. I want somebody's who's real and beautiful at the same time. She had a kid a couple of years ago, so she has a real body as opposed to these manufactured bodies." Thierry had previously played "reserved, beautiful characters", but Gilliam instructed her to think of Bainsley as "Marilyn Monroe and Judy Holliday combined". Jessica Biel was originally attached to the role.

- Lucas Hedges as Bob
- Sanjeev Bhaskar as Doctor 1
- Peter Stormare as Doctor 2
- Ben Whishaw as Doctor 3
- Matt Damon as Management. Al Pacino was attached to the role at one point.
- Tilda Swinton as Dr. Shrink-Rom
- Emil Hostina as Slim Clone
- Pavlic Nemes as Chubs Clone
- Dana Rogoz as Pizza Girl

Gwendoline Christie, Rupert Friend, Ray Cooper, and Lily Cole appear in commercials Qohen passes on the street early in the film.

== Production ==
=== Development ===
Pat Rushin, a professor of creative writing at the University of Central Florida, was inspired to write the film by vanitas of Ecclesiastes 1:2; 12:8 (the Hebrew title of which is קֹהֶלֶת, or "Qoheleth", meaning "Gatherer", but traditionally translated as "Teacher" or "Preacher"), which he felt suggested such questions as "What is the value of life? What is the meaning of existence? What's the use?" He wrote the 145-page first draft of the script in ten days, with "no idea what [he] was doing". To learn how to write a screenplay, he checked out several screenwriting books and screenplays from the UCF library, that of Terry Gilliam's Brazil among them.

Producer Richard D. Zanuck originally signed Ewan McGregor to play Qohen Leth, but the actor dropped out. A later iteration of the project, which would have starred Billy Bob Thornton, Jessica Biel, and Al Pacino and been directed by Gilliam, was set to begin production in 2009, first in London, and then in Vancouver. Plans to film with this cast fell through when Gilliam pulled out to complete work on The Imaginarium of Doctor Parnassus, which was put behind schedule by the death of its star, Heath Ledger.

In 2012, the project was restarted. Christoph Waltz replaced Thornton in the lead role, and the late Zanuck's son Dean replaced him as producer.

=== Filming ===
Principal photography was scheduled to run from 22 October to 3 December 2012. It eventually required one more day, meaning the shoot actually lasted 37 days.

Because Gilliam had faced frustrations over the aspect ratio used for home video releases of his earlier film Tideland (2005), The Zero Theorem was shot in the Maxivision format with a 1.85:1 aspect ratio (with 16:9 matting and telecine in mind) so he could be certain every viewer in the world would see exactly what he intended them to see in a premeditated 16:9 framing, no matter what device was used. He also liked that this technique, referred to by him as "the first one-size-fits-all, full-frame, semi-vinyl motion picture", resulted in round edges on frame corners, which he found resembled a vintage 1920s movie-going experience when projectors were not yet fitted to hide the camera gate's round edges.

Of the production process, Gilliam stated: "It's been one year from start to finish. Most of my movies take three years but this was a fast shoot and it was good to be in Bucharest. I loved the crews and Romanians work very hard and they're very skilled. Because we had limited funds we were flying people in for the day and back out again. I was knackered by the end of it." He also commented on the difficulty of producing such a film in the current industry climate, saying: "This was a more modest budget than some of the big effects movies I've worked on but it's going to look so good on the screen. What's happened is the industry has become very much like society – there are the rich [films] and the cheap ones and the middle-budget films have been squeezed out of existence. You've got to get clever and take advantage of your friends who work for scale and work in great places with great crews where you get a bigger bang for your buck."

=== Production design ===
In an e-mail sent to production designer Dave Warren, Gilliam concisely stated the look he intended for the film: "Neo Rauch + Ukulele Ike = The Zero Theorem".

=== Music ===
The film's score was provided by British composer George Fenton. Gilliam described it as being "like a ghost, this other character we never see". A lounge music version of Radiohead's song "Creep" performed by Karen Souza is heard in the film when Qohen visits Bainsley's website and over the closing credits.

== Release ==
The Zero Theorem premiered at the 70th Venice International Film Festival on 2 September 2013. The film was theatrically released in the United Kingdom on 14 March 2014, by Stage 6 Films.

== Reception ==
On Rotten Tomatoes, the film has a rating of 50%, based on reviews from 131 critics, with a weighted average score of 5.70/10; the site's critical consensus states: "Fans of director Terry Gilliam's trademark visual aesthetic will find everything they've bargained for, but for the unconverted, The Zero Theorem may prove too muddled to enjoy." On review aggregator website Metacritic, it has a score of 50%, based on reviews from 28 critics, indicating "mixed or average reviews".

Harry Knowles, who saw an early screening of the film, gave it a very positive review, writing that it was "perfect" and Gilliam's best film since Brazil and that Waltz's performance was "amazing" and the actor deserved to win the Academy Award for Best Actor. He said he hoped the final version of the film would be the one he saw, stating: "There's not a frame needing to be lost".

Commenting on the film's misrepresentation by critics, Gilliam stated on his official Facebook page that one of the few critics to note that The Zero Theorem was not a comedy, but rather a tragedy, was Dave Lancaster of Cinemas Online.
