= Robert Henderson (Middlesex cricketer) =

English cricketer

Robert Henderson (3 May 1851 – 22 September 1895) was an English first-class cricketer active 1872–78 who played for Middlesex. He was born in Fulham and educated at Harrow School. Henderson died in Horsham.
