= Monea =

Coordinates: 54.3927°N 7.7574°W

Monea: Irish: Maigh Niadh
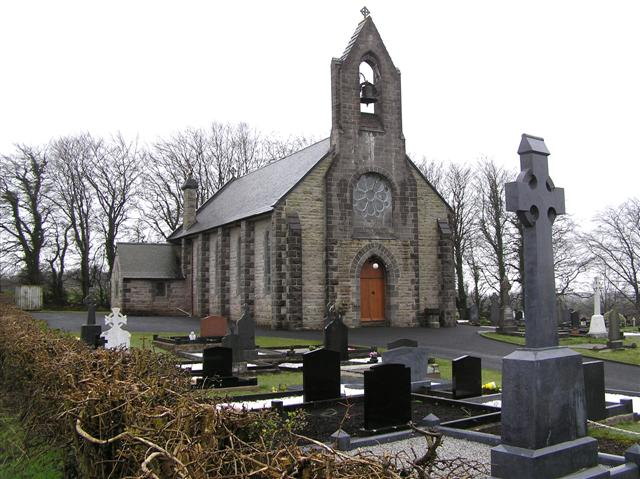
- Monea Catholic church

- Location within Northern Ireland
- Population: 248 (2021 Census)
- Irish grid reference: H161500
  - Belfast: 90 miles (140 km)
- District: Fermanagh and Omagh
- County: County Fermanagh
- Country: Northern Ireland
- Sovereign state: United Kingdom
- Post town: ENNISKILLEN
- Postcode district: BT93
- Dialling code: 028, +44 28
- UK Parliament: Fermanagh and South Tyrone
- NI Assembly: Fermanagh and South Tyrone

Monea (from Irish Maigh Niadh, meaning 'plain of warriors') is a small village and townland in County Fermanagh, Northern Ireland, about 10 kilometres (6 mi) northwest of Enniskillen. In the 2021 census it had a population of 248.

== Transport ==
Ulsterbus route 59 provides five journeys a day (only on school terms) otherwise its four, to/from Enniskillen and Derrygonnelly. There are no Saturday or Sunday services.

== Places of interest ==
- Monea Castle, a historic monument, is located in Monea.
