= Brougher =

Brougher is a surname. Notable people with the surname include:

- Hilary Brougher, American screenwriter and director
- Kerry Brougher, American museum director
- William E. Brougher (1889–1965), American WWI and WWII veteran

== See also ==
- Andre Braugher (1962–2023), American actor
