= Aghaherrish =

Townland in County Fermanagh, Northern Ireland

Coordinates: 54.354812°N 7.795435°W

Aghaherrish (from Irish Achadh Thairis 'field of the crossing') is a townland located in Boho in County Fermanagh, Northern Ireland.

The area is famous for a waterfall which is known as Boho Falls in some quarters. The river above the waterfall is known as the Trimog. The area was also the site of an old country school known as Aghaherrish school.

The townland contains a Scheduled Historic Monument: a Counterscarp rath, grid ref: H1312 4467.

== Name ==
In the past, the townland has been anglicised into a variety of forms, as well as at least one attempt at translation back into Irish. During the plantation of Ulster, the lands of Aghaherrish were leased as follows: A fourth part of a quarter of Aghorerishe to Shane McEnabb (McCabe); a 1/2 of a fourth part of a quarter of Agheherish in Glacke to Patrick McHugh Magwire; 5/12 of the half quarter of Aghoheris to Felim McAwly and 1/12 of the half quarter of Aghoheris to Bryan Oge Magwire.

- Aghoherris half (1609)
- Agheherish (1611)
- Aghoherishe (1611)
- Ahaveris (Magheryboy)(1672c)
- Achadh h-Eiris stated as meaning "field of the charcoal" (1833)
