= Pat Rushin =

American screenwriter

- Born: 1953 (age 72–73)
- Education: University of Dayton; Ohio State University; Johns Hopkins University
- Occupations: Professor, screenwriter
- Employer: University of Central Florida

Pat Rushin (born 1953) is an American screenwriter and academic.

He is a creative writing professor at the University of Central Florida where he has served as the editor of The Florida Review.

Rushin's novella, The Call, inspired the screenplay he wrote for The Zero Theorem, directed by Terry Gilliam.

== Career ==
Rushin attended the University of Dayton where he received a Bachelor of Arts degree in English in 1976. He later attended Ohio State University where he obtained a master's degree in English in 1979. He graduated from Johns Hopkins University in 1982 with a master's degree in creative writing and fiction.

In 1991, Rushin's book of short stories, Puzzling Through the News, was published by Galileo Press. The short film No Ordinary Sun (2004) was based on his short story "Speed of Light".

The original script for Rushin's first screenplay was written in 1999 and inspired by the film The Call. He submitted it to Project Greenlight, a television series produced by Matt Damon and Ben Affleck; the science-fiction film, directed by Terry Gilliam, was released in 2013.

In 2015, Rushin's novella The Call: A Virtual Parable was published by Burrow Press. His writing has also been included in literary magazines including the Indiana Review, the North American Review and the American Literary Review.

== Bibliography ==
- Pat Rushin (1991). Puzzling Through the News. Galileo Press.
- Pat Rushin (2015). The Call: A Virtual Parable. Burrow Press.

== Filmography ==
- No Ordinary Sun (2004)
- The Zero Theorem (2014)
