= Inishmacsaint =

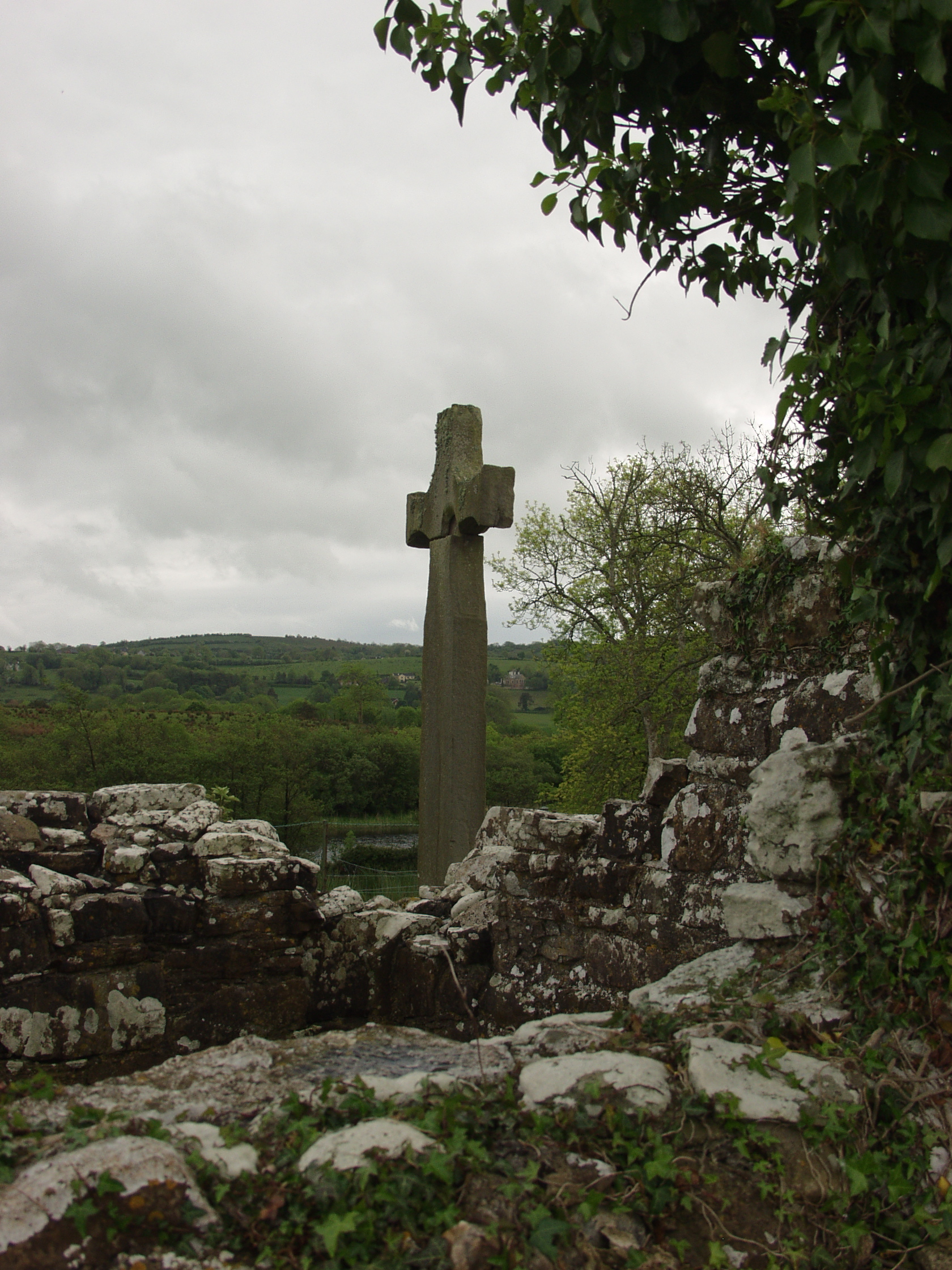
- Church ruins and high cross of Inishmacsaint
- Interactive map of Inishmacsaint

Monastery information
- Established: 6th century
- Diocese: Diocese of Clogher

People
- Founder: St. Ninnidh

Site
- Location: Lough Erne, Enniskillen, County Fermanagh
- Coordinates: 54°26′08″N 7°44′44″W

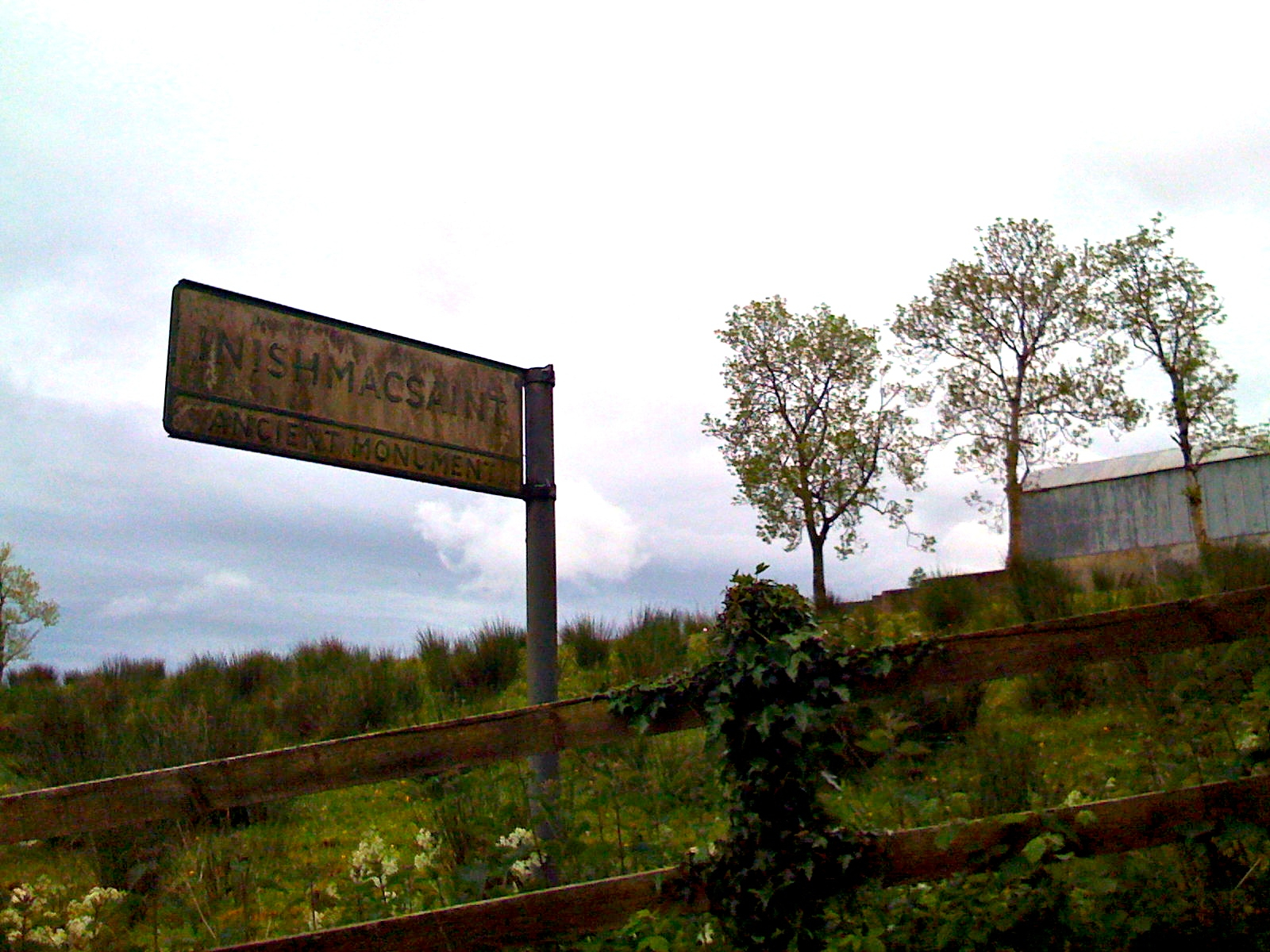
Signpost on mainland off A46, Lough Shore Drive.

Inishmacsaint (Irish: Inis-maige-samh, meaning 'Island of the Sorrel Plain') is a monastery located on an island off the western shore of Lough Erne, County Fermanagh, Northern Ireland. The site includes the ruins of a monastic church and an early stone cross, probably from the tenth and twelfth centuries. Inishmacsaint was founded by St. Ninnidh, (d. 523/30). The original monastic buildings were probably damaged or destroyed during the raids of the ninth or tenth centuries.

== Saints associated with Inishmacsaint Abbey ==
- Saint Ninnidh, feast day 18 January

== Abbotts of Inishmacsaint Abbey ==
- Fiannamail: c. 718
