= Monea castle =

Castle in County Fermanagh, Northern Ireland

Coordinates: 54.393°N 7.748°W

Monea Castle is a castle located in Monea, County Fermanagh, Northern Ireland. It is a State Care Historic Monument situated in the townland of Castletown Monea, in Fermanagh District Council area, at grid ref: H1647 4937.

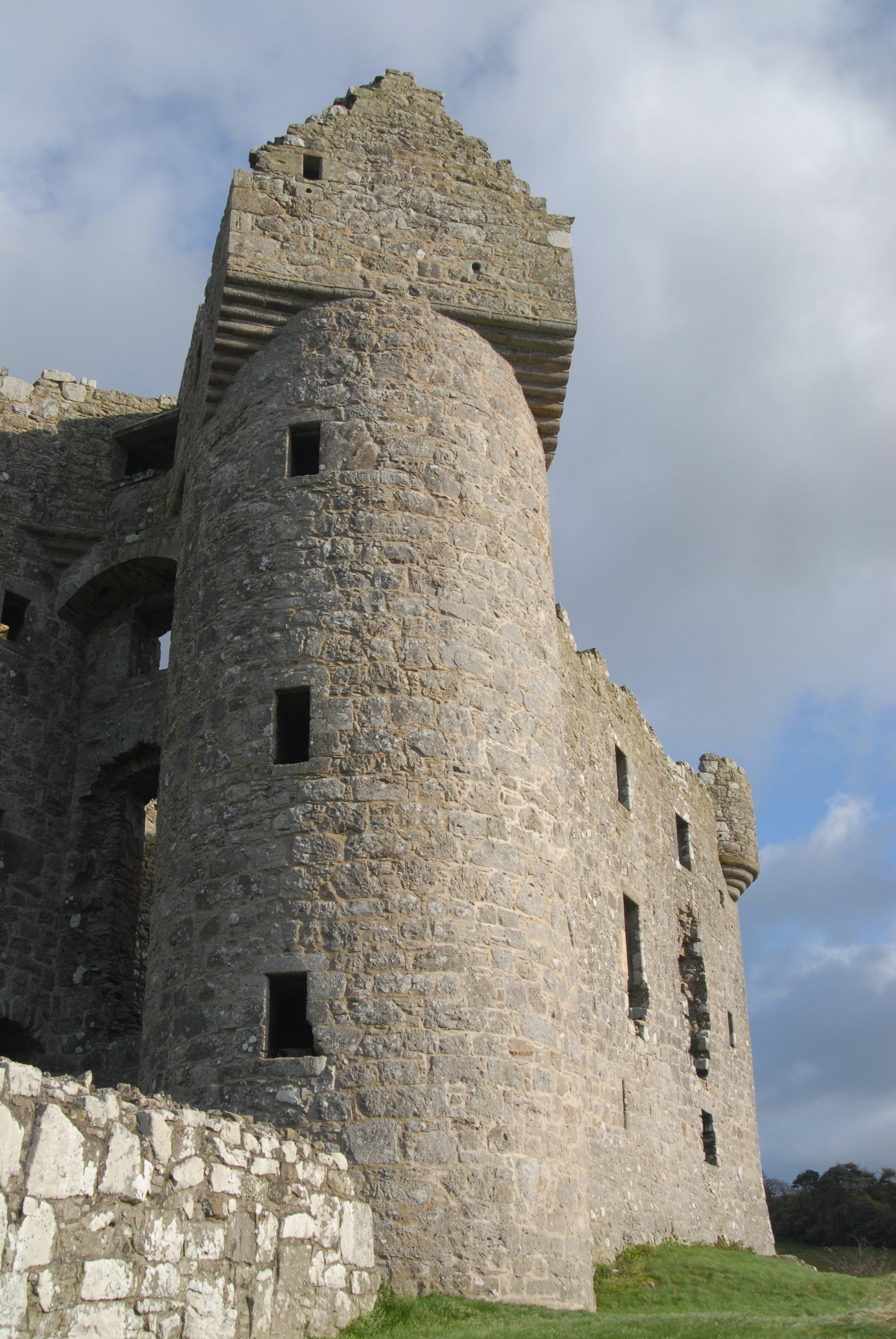
Monea Castle in 2007

== History ==
Monea Castle is situated where a Maguire castle once existed prior to the Plantation, with a crannog still visible. Construction of the building began in 1616 (409 years ago), and a bawn was added later in 1622. During the Irish Rebellion of 1641, the castle was attacked by Rory Maguire while it was being used to shelter Protestants.

== See also ==
- Castles in Northern Ireland

See Bill Wilsdon's "Plantation Castles on the Erne" for more information
