= Aghamore, County Fermanagh =

Townland in County Fermanagh, Northern Ireland

Coordinates: 54.360043°N 7.850875°W

Aghamore (from Irish Achadh Mor 'great field') is a townland which is located in the Civil Parish of Inishmacsaint, to the north-west of Derrygonnelly, County Fermanagh, Northern Ireland. The townland contains Carrick Church and graveyard (grid ref: H0962 5388), which are Scheduled Historic Monuments.

== History ==
In 1498, after the death of his daughter, Gilbert Ó Flannagáin had a church (Carrick Church) erected at Aghamore, which was known at that time as Achadh-Mor-Baile-Uí-Flannagáin, in the parish of Inishmacsaint in the Barony of Magheraboy.

O'Flanagan made his residence on an artificial island in Carrick Lough not far from his church.

In 1672, this townland was known as Aghamore in the Barony of Magheryboy, and was the medieval seat of the Ó Flannagáin (O'Flanagan) dynasty.

== See also ==
- List of townlands in County Fermanagh
