= List of townlands of County Cavan =

This is a sortable table of the approximately 1,979 townlands in County Cavan, Ireland.

Duplicate names occur where there is more than one townland with the same name in the county. Names marked in bold typeface are towns and villages, and the word Town appears for those entries in the Acres column.

== Townland list ==
Townland	Acres	Barony	Civil parish	Poor law union
Abbey Land	9	Upper Loughtee	Urney	Cavan
Acres	59	Clanmahon	Denn	Cavan
Aghabane	121	Tullyhunco	Kildallan	Cavan
Aghaboy (Kinawley)	285	Tullyhaw	Kinawley	Bawnboy
Aghaboy (Drumlumman)	116	Clanmahon	Drumlumman	Granard
Aghacashel	330	Castlerahan	Lurgan	Oldcastle
Aghaconny	213	Clanmahon	Crosserlough	Cavan
Aghacreevy	144	Clanmahon	Ballymachugh	Cavan
Aghadoon (or Ravenfield)	69	Upper Loughtee	Denn	Cavan
Aghadreenagh	95	Upper Loughtee	Denn	Cavan
Aghadreenagh	499	Upper Loughtee	Lavey	Cavan
Aghadreenagh	177	Tullygarvey	Annagh	Cootehill
Aghadrumgowna (or Calf Field)	230	Tullygarvey	Larah	Cootehill
Aghadrumgullin	99	Upper Loughtee	Castleterra	Cavan
Aghafad	69	Clanmahon	Ballymachugh	Cavan
Aghagashlan	342	Tullygarvey	Drumgoon	Cootehill
Aghagegna	164	Castlerahan	Crosserlough	Cavan
Aghagolrick	155	Upper Loughtee	Larah	Cavan
Aghakee	100	Castlerahan	Crosserlough	Cavan
Aghakilmore Lower	252	Clanmahon	Ballymachugh	Cavan
Aghakilmore Upper	77	Clanmahon	Ballymachugh	Cavan
Aghakinnigh	460	Tullyhaw	Kinawley	Bawnboy
Aghaknock	180	Tullyhunco	Killashandra	Cavan
Aghalackan	482	Upper Loughtee	Annagelliff	Cavan
Aghalattafraal	307	Upper Loughtee	Denn	Oldcastle
Aghalion	491	Castlerahan	Castlerahan	Oldcastle
Aghaloory	770	Clanmahon	Ballintemple	Cavan
Aghaloughan	228	Castlerahan	Lurgan	Oldcastle
Agharah	135	Clankee	Knockbride	Bailieborough
Agharahan	149	Upper Loughtee	Annagelliff	Cavan
Agharaskilly	550	Lower Loughtee	Tomregan	Bawnboy
Aghateeduff	163	Upper Loughtee	Castleterra	Cavan
Aghateemore Glebe	13	Upper Loughtee	Larah	Cavan
Aghateggal (or Ryefort)	109	Upper Loughtee	Denn	Cavan
Aghatotan	202	Tullygarvey	Kildrumsherdan	Cootehill
Aghavaddy	92	Upper Loughtee	Denn	Cavan
Aghavadrin	183	Tullyhunco	Killashandra	Cavan
Aghaveans	615	Tullyhunco	Scrabby	Granard
Aghavilla	129	Lower Loughtee	Drumlane	Cavan
Aghavoher	228	Lower Loughtee	Tomregan	Bawnboy
Aghaway	328	Tullygarvey	Larah	Cootehill
Aghawee	448	Clanmahon	Crosserlough	Cavan
Aghaweely Lower	330	Clanmahon	Ballintemple	Cavan
Aghaweely Upper	231	Clanmahon	Ballintemple	Cavan
Aghaweenagh	375	Tullyhunco	Kildallan	Bawnboy
Aghawoman	105	Clanmahon	Kilbride	Oldcastle
Aghnacally	760	Tullyhaw	Kinawley	Bawnboy
Aghnaclue	70	Clankee	Moybolgue	Bailieborough
Aghnacollia	322	Tullyhaw	Templeport	Bawnboy
Aghnacor	157	Tullyhunco	Killashandra	Cavan
Aghnacreevy	240	Tullyhunco	Kildallan	Bawnboy
Aghnadaraghan	49	Tullygarvey	Drung	Cootehill
Aghnadrung	68	Castlerahan	Lurgan	Oldcastle
Aghnaglosh	172	Upper Loughtee	Annagelliff	Cavan
Aghnaglosh	192	Tullygarvey	Kildrumsherdan	Cootehill
Aghnaguig	70	Lower Loughtee	Annagh	Cavan
Aghnahaia Glebe	107	Upper Loughtee	Denn	Cavan
Aghnahederny	254	Clanmahon	Kilbride	Cavan
Aghnaskeagh	124	Clanmahon	Kilbride	Oldcastle
Aghnaskerry	7	Upper Loughtee	Urney	Cavan
Aghoutereery	368	Clanmahon	Kilbride	Cavan
Aghullaghy	48	Tullyhunco	Killashandra	Cavan
Altachullion Lower	276	Tullyhaw	Templeport	Bawnboy
Altachullion Upper	272	Tullyhaw	Templeport	Bawnboy
Altateskin	529	Tullyhaw	Templeport	Bawnboy
Altbeagh	359	Tullygarvey	Larah	Cavan
Altbrean	325	Tullyhaw	Kinawley	Bawnboy
Altcrock	568	Tullyhaw	Templeport	Bawnboy
Alteen	1,144	Tullyhaw	Kinawley	Bawnboy
Altinure	265	Tullyhaw	Templeport	Bawnboy
Altnadarragh	371	Tullyhaw	Templeport	Bawnboy
Altnasheen	400	Tullyhaw	Templeport	Enniskillen
Altshallan	289	Tullyhaw	Templeport	Enniskillen
Annafarney	221	Clankee	Knockbride	Cootehill
Annagelliff	134	Upper Loughtee	Annagelliff	Cavan
Annagh	76	Clankee	Enniskeen	Bailieborough
Annagh, County Cavan	389	Tullyhaw	Tomregan	Bawnboy
Annagh	112	Lower Loughtee	Annagh	Cavan
Annagh	95	Upper Loughtee	Kilmore	Cavan
Annagh	132	Clanmahon	Drumlumman	Granard
Annaghard	227	Tullygarvey	Drumgoon	Cootehill
Annagharnet	543	Castlerahan	Mullagh	Bailieborough
Annaghduff	92	Upper Loughtee	Castleterra	Cavan
Annaghierin	217	Clankee	Shercock	Bailieborough
Annaghlee	176	Tullygarvey	Kildrumsherdan	Cootehill
Annaghoash	93	Tullygarvey	Annagh	Cootehill
Ardamagh	424	Tullygarvey	Annagh	Cootehill
Ardan	277	Lower Loughtee	Drumlane	Cavan
Ardardagh	234	Upper Loughtee	Larah	Cavan
Ardarragh	89	Tullyhunco	Killashandra	Cavan
Arderry	210	Tullyhaw	Templeport	Bawnboy
Ardglushin	137	Tullygarvey	Annagh	Cootehill
Ardkill Beg	169	Upper Loughtee	Denn	Cavan
Ardkill More	278	Upper Loughtee	Denn	Cavan
Ardleny	507	Clanmahon	Ballintemple	Cavan
Ardlougher	142	Tullyhunco	Kildallan	Bawnboy
Ardlougher	430	Clanmahon	Denn	Cavan
Ardlougher	194	Tullyhaw	Killinagh	Enniskillen
Ardlow	379	Castlerahan	Mullagh	Bailieborough
Ardmone	139	Clankee	Drumgoon	Cootehill
Ardmone East	151	Clankee	Knockbride	Cootehill
Ardmone West	237	Clankee	Knockbride	Cootehill
Ardmoneen	362	Tullyhaw	Drumreilly	Bawnboy
Ardonan	136	Lower Loughtee	Drumlane	Cavan
Ardoohy	25	Lower Loughtee	Drumlane	Cavan
Ardra	260	Tullyhunco	Killashandra	Cavan
Ardue	212	Lower Loughtee	Drumlane	Cavan
Ardvagh	307	Tullyhaw	Templeport	Enniskillen
Ardvarny	146	Clanmahon	Denn	Cavan
Arnaghan	193	Tullyhunco	Scrabby	Granard
Artidwney	49	Lower Loughtee	Drumlane	Cavan
Artonagh	103	Lower Loughtee	Drumlane	Cavan
Artonagh	409	Tullygarvey	Larah	Cootehill
**Arvagh**	Town	Tullyhunco	Killashandra	Cavan
Ashgrove	264	Lower Loughtee	Drumlane	Cavan
Assan	138	Castlerahan	Killinkere	Bailieborough
Aughrim	247	Tullyhaw	Tomregan	Bawnboy
Aughtreagh	88	Tullygarvey	Annagh	Cavan
**Bailieborough**	Town	Clankee	Bailieborough	Bailieborough
Ballaghanea	398	Castlerahan	Lurgan	Oldcastle
Ballaghanea Island	5	Castlerahan	Lurgan	Oldcastle
Ballaghanna	242	Clanmahon	Kilbride	Cavan
Ballaghdorragh	325	Castlerahan	Munterconnaught	Oldcastle
Ballina	77	Clanmahon	Ballymachugh	Cavan
Ballinlough	153	Lower Loughtee	Annagh	Cavan
Ballintemple	344	Clanmahon	Ballintemple	Cavan
Balloughly	282	Clankee	Enniskeen	Bailieborough
**Ballyconnell**	Town	Tullyhaw	Tomregan	Bawnboy
**Ballyhaise**	Town	Upper Loughtee	Castleterra	Cavan
Ballyhally	144	Tullygarvey	Drung	Cootehill
Ballyheelan	89	Clanmahon	Ballymachugh	Cavan
Ballyhugh	333	Lower Loughtee	Drumlane	Cavan
**Ballyjamesduff**	Town	Castlerahan	Castlerahan	Oldcastle
Ballymackinroe	298	Upper Loughtee	Annagelliff	Cavan
Ballymagauran	327	Tullyhaw	Templeport	Bawnboy
Ballymagirril	156	Tullyhaw	Templeport	Bawnboy
Ballynahaia	117	Tullygarvey	Drumgoon	Cootehill
Ballynamaddoo	233	Tullyhaw	Templeport	Bawnboy
Ballynamannan	42	Lower Loughtee	Drumlane	Cavan
Ballynamona	341	Clankee	Moybolgue	Bailieborough
Ballynamony	82	Clanmahon	Ballymachugh	Cavan
Ballyneary	32	Lower Loughtee	Annagh	Cavan
Ballytrust	250	Clanmahon	Ballintemple	Cavan
Ballytrust Lower	79	Clanmahon	Ballintemple	Cavan
Banagher	495	Upper Loughtee	Denn	Cavan
Baraghy	247	Tullygarvey	Drumgoon	Cootehill
Barconny (Cuppage)	181	Castlerahan	Castlerahan	Oldcastle
Barconny (Grattan)	44	Castlerahan	Castlerahan	Oldcastle
Barconny (Massereene)	35	Castlerahan	Castlerahan	Oldcastle
Barconny (Nugent)	297	Castlerahan	Castlerahan	Oldcastle
Barconny (Robinson)	138	Castlerahan	Castlerahan	Oldcastle
Barnagrow	267	Clankee	Drumgoon	Cootehill
Barragh	235	Tullygarvey	Kildrumsherdan	Cootehill
Barran	852	Tullyhaw	Killinagh	Enniskillen
Bawn	142	Tullyhunco	Killashandra	Cavan
Bawn	121	Clanmahon	Drumlumman	Granard
**Bawnboy**	Town	Tullyhaw	Templeport	Bawnboy
Bawnboy	336	Tullyhaw	Templeport	Bawnboy
Beagh Glebe	654	Castlerahan	Killinkere	Bailieborough
Beaghy	187	Upper Loughtee	Annagelliff	Cavan
Beaghy	454	Upper Loughtee	Lavey	Cavan
Beckscourt	75	Clankee	Bailieborough	Bailieborough
Beglieve	475	Clankee	Knockbride	Bailieborough
Behernagh	771	Castlerahan	Munterconnaught	Oldcastle
Behy	334	Tullyhunco	Killashandra	Cavan
Bellaheady (or Rossbressal)	222	Tullyhunco	Kildallan	Bawnboy
Bellaleenan	222	Tullyhaw	Templeport	Bawnboy
Bellamont Forest	870	Tullygarvey	Drumgoon	Cootehill
**Bellanacargy**	Town	Tullygarvey	Drung	Cootehill
Bellanacargy	229	Tullygarvey	Drung	Cootehill
Bellanagh	136	Clanmahon	Kilmore	Cavan
**Bellananagh**	Town	Clanmahon	Kilmore	Cavan
Bellavally Lower	1,014	Tullyhaw	Templeport	Enniskillen
Bellavally Upper	709	Tullyhaw	Templeport	Enniskillen
Bellsgrove	306	Clanmahon	Ballymachugh	Cavan
Bellville	364	Clanmahon	Kilmore	Cavan
**Belturbet**	Town	Lower Loughtee	Annagh	Cavan
Benwilt	265	Tullygarvey	Drumgoon	Cootehill
Bernyhill	212	Tullyhunco	Scrabby	Granard
Berrymount	134	Lower Loughtee	Tomregan	Bawnboy
Bessbrook	87	Lower Loughtee	Annagh	Cavan
Billis	288	Castlerahan	Killinkere	Bailieborough
Billis	261	Upper Loughtee	Annagelliff	Castletowndelvin
Binbane	127	Tullygarvey	Kildrumsherdan	Cootehill
Bindoo	222	Tullygarvey	Kildrumsherdan	Cootehill
Bingfield (or Gortnashangan Lower)	123	Clanmahon	Kilmore	Cavan
Binkeeragh	296	Tullyhaw	Kinawley	Bawnboy
Birragh	197	Clankee	Enniskeen	Bailieborough
Black Bull (or Gallonbulloge)	45	Upper Loughtee	Denn	Cavan
Blackhills Lower	235	Clankee	Moybolgue	Bailieborough
Blackhills Upper	172	Clankee	Moybolgue	Bailieborough
Blackstep	183	Clankee	Knockbride	Bailieborough
Bleancup	118	Upper Loughtee	Kilmore	Cavan
Boagh	365	Tullygarvey	Drumgoon	Cootehill
Bobsgrove	313	Clanmahon	Kilbride	Oldcastle
Bocade Glebe	271	Tullyhunco	Kildallan	Bawnboy
Bofealan	78	Tullyhaw	Templeport	Bawnboy
Bogesky	305	Lower Loughtee	Lavey	Cavan
Bohora	106	Tullyhunco	Killashandra	Cavan
Boley, Templeport	294	Tullyhaw	Templeport	Bawnboy
Borim (Kinawley)	181	Tullyhaw	Kinawley	Bawnboy
Bracklagh	52	Tullygarvey	Drung	Cootehill
Bracklagh	247	Clanmahon	Drumlumman	Granard
Brackley, Templeport	618	Tullyhaw	Templeport	Bawnboy
Bracklin	166	Clankee	Bailieborough	Bailieborough
Bracklin	536	Clankee	Enniskeen	Bailieborough
Brackloney	234	Castlerahan	Castlerahan	Oldcastle
Brankill	463	Tullyhunco	Killashandra	Cavan
Brankill (Flood)	78	Lower Loughtee	Drumlane	Cavan
Brankill (Lanesborough)	138	Lower Loughtee	Drumlane	Cavan
Breandrum, Tullyhunco	63	Tullyhunco	Kildallan	Bawnboy
Breandrum	134	Upper Loughtee	Kilmore	Cavan
Brockly	96	Tullygarvey	Annagh	Cootehill
Broughderg	165	Upper Loughtee	Larah	Cavan
Bruse	605	Tullyhunco	Killashandra	Cavan
Bruse	153	Castlerahan	Loughan or Castlekeeran	Oldcastle
Brusky	152	Clanmahon	Ballintemple	Cavan
Bulligs	60	Lower Loughtee	Drumlane	Cavan
Bun	230	Lower Loughtee	Urney	Cavan
Bunanumery	44	Lower Loughtee	Drumlane	Cavan
Bunnoe	197	Tullygarvey	Drung	Cootehill
Burgessacre	22	Upper Loughtee	Urney	Cavan
Burnew	179	Castlerahan	Killinkere	Bailieborough
Burren	943	Tullyhaw	Templeport	Bawnboy
Burren	271	Tullyhaw	Killinagh	Enniskillen
Burrencarragh	140	Castlerahan	Lurgan	Oldcastle
Burrenrea	146	Castlerahan	Lurgan	Oldcastle
Bursan	406	Tullyhaw	Templeport	Enniskillen
**Butlersbridge**	Town	Upper Loughtee	Castleterra	Cavan
Cabra	599	Clankee	Enniskeen	Bailieborough
Cabragh	205	Tullygarvey	Drumgoon	Cootehill
Cabragh	188	Tullygarvey	Kildrumsherdan	Cootehill
Caldragh	52	Lower Loughtee	Drumlane	Cavan
Calf Field (or Aghadrumgowna)	230	Tullygarvey	Larah	Cootehill
Callaghs	335	Tullyhunco	Kildallan	Bawnboy
Callanagh Lower	276	Clanmahon	Drumlumman	Granard
Callanagh Middle	167	Clanmahon	Drumlumman	Granard
Callanagh Upper	159	Clanmahon	Drumlumman	Granard
Camagh	162	Tullyhaw	Templeport	Bawnboy
Camalier	91	Lower Loughtee	Drumlane	Cavan
Campstown	229	Tullygarvey	Kildrumsherdan	Cootehill
Cappagh	212	Tullyhunco	Killashandra	Cavan
Cappog	268	Clankee	Knockbride	Bailieborough
Capragh	85	Clanmahon	Ballymachugh	Cavan
Cargagh	286	Castlerahan	Killinkere	Bailieborough
Cargagh	1,038	Upper Loughtee	Lavey	Cavan
Carha	108	Tullygarvey	Larah	Cootehill
Carn, Tullyhunco	227	Tullyhunco	Kildallan	Bawnboy
Carn	262	Upper Loughtee	Denn	Cavan
Carn	265	Castlerahan	Castlerahan	Oldcastle
Carnagarve	618	Castlerahan	Killinkere	Bailieborough
Carnagh Lower	361	Clanmahon	Drumlumman	Granard
Carnagh Upper	277	Clanmahon	Drumlumman	Granard
Carnalynch	468	Castlerahan	Killinkere	Bailieborough
Carnans Lower	206	Clankee	Moybolgue	Bailieborough
Carnans Upper	150	Clankee	Moybolgue	Bailieborough
Carnin	390	Castlerahan	Castlerahan	Oldcastle
Carnmaclean	186	Tullyhaw	Templeport	Enniskillen
Carnoge	27	Upper Loughtee	Castleterra	Cavan
Carolina	207	Tullygarvey	Drumgoon	Cootehill
Carrakeelty Beg	120	Castlerahan	Lurgan	Oldcastle
Carrakeelty More	124	Castlerahan	Lurgan	Oldcastle
Carramoreen	69	Tullygarvey	Annagh	Cavan
Carrick	498	Clanmahon	Drumlumman	Granard
Carrick	557	Castlerahan	Munterconnaught	Oldcastle
Carrick East	126	Tullyhaw	Templeport	Bawnboy
Carrick West	157	Tullyhaw	Templeport	Enniskillen
Carrickabane	167	Clanmahon	Crosserlough	Cavan
Carrickabane	190	Clanmahon	Drumlumman	Granard
Carrickaboy Glebe	166	Upper Loughtee	Denn	Cavan
Carrickacroman	1,425	Tullygarvey	Larah	Cootehill
Carrickacroy	236	Castlerahan	Crosserlough	Cavan
Carrickakillew	287	Clanmahon	Drumlumman	Granard
Carrickallen	504	Tullygarvey	Larah	Cootehill
Carrickalwy	333	Tullygarvey	Kildrumsherdan	Cootehill
Carrickane	89	Upper Loughtee	Annagelliff	Cavan
Carrickateane	152	Upper Loughtee	Castleterra	Cavan
Carrickatober	213	Upper Loughtee	Denn	Cavan
Carrickavee	296	Castlerahan	Castlerahan	Oldcastle
Carrickbrannan	133	Tullyhaw	Killinagh	Enniskillen
Carrickclevan	248	Clanmahon	Ballintemple	Cavan
Carrickcreeny	549	Clankee	Shercock	Bailieborough
Carrickeeshill	298	Castlerahan	Killinkere	Bailieborough
Carrickgorman	343	Castlerahan	Killinkere	Bailieborough
Carrickmore	274	Upper Loughtee	Castleterra	Cavan
Carricknabrick	98	Clanmahon	Drumlumman	Granard
Carricknagrow	679	Tullyhaw	Killinagh	Enniskillen
Carricknamaddoo	624	Upper Loughtee	Killinkere	Cavan
Carricknashoke	330	Tullygarvey	Larah	Cootehill
Carricknaveagh	337	Castlerahan	Killinkere	Bailieborough
Carricknaveddan	160	Upper Loughtee	Lavey	Cavan
Carrigabruse	207	Castlerahan	Loughan or Castlekeeran	Oldcastle
Carrigan	102	Lower Loughtee	Tomregan	Bawnboy
Carrigan	313	Clanmahon	Ballintemple	Cavan
Carrigan	94	Lower Loughtee	Drumlane	Cavan
Carrigasimon	247	Castlerahan	Loughan or Castlekeeran	Oldcastle
Carrowfarnaghan	163	Lower Loughtee	Drumlane	Cavan
Carrowmore	980	Tullyhaw	Tomregan	Bawnboy
Carrowreagh	196	Clankee	Enniskeen	Bailieborough
Cartronfree	312	Clanmahon	Drumlumman	Granard
Cartronnagilta	244	Tullyhaw	Templeport	Bawnboy
Cashel	226	Clanmahon	Crosserlough	Cavan
Cashel	137	Clankee	Drumgoon	Cootehill
Cashel	169	Tullyhaw	Killinagh	Enniskillen
Cashelbane	214	Tullyhaw	Killinagh	Enniskillen
Castlecosby (or Kevit Upper)	136	Clanmahon	Kilmore	Cavan
Castlepoles	503	Tullyhunco	Killashandra	Cavan
Castlerahan	504	Castlerahan	Castlerahan	Oldcastle
Castlesaunderson Demesn	932	Tullygarvey	Annagh	Cavan
Castleterra	141	Upper Loughtee	Castleterra	Cavan
Cauhoo	371	Upper Loughtee	Kilmore	Cavan
**Cavan**	Town	Upper Loughtee	Urney	Cavan
Cavanagh	275	Tullyhaw	Tomregan	Bawnboy
Cavanaquill	101	Tullyhaw	Templeport	Bawnboy
Cavanarainy	184	Tullygarvey	Drung	Cootehill
Cavancoulter	84	Clanmahon	Kilbride	Oldcastle
Cavanfin	66	Clanmahon	Kilmore	Cavan
Cavanskeldragh	76	Clankee	Knockbride	Bailieborough
Cavantimahon	214	Clankee	Knockbride	Cootehill
Claddagh	334	Castlerahan	Castlerahan	Oldcastle
Claragh	111	Tullyhunco	Kildallan	Bawnboy
Claragh	300	Tullygarvey	Annagh	Cootehill
Claragh	246	Tullygarvey	Kildrumsherdan	Cootehill
Clarbally	145	Tullyhaw	Templeport	Bawnboy
Clare	312	Castlerahan	Crosserlough	Oldcastle
Clarebane	78	Upper Loughtee	Kilmore	Cavan
Clareboy	101	Upper Loughtee	Crosserlough	Cavan
Claraghpottle Glebe	41	Tullyhunco	Kildallan	Bawnboy
Cleffin	378	Castlerahan	Killinkere	Bailieborough
Cleggan	95	Castlerahan	Lurgan	Oldcastle
**Clementstown**	Town	Tullygarvey	Kildrumsherdan	Cootehill
Clifferna	872	Tullygarvey	Larah	Cootehill
Clifton	82	Lower Loughtee	Tomregan	Bawnboy
Clodrum	95	Tullyhunco	Killashandra	Cavan
Cloggagh	213	Castlerahan	Castlerahan	Oldcastle
Cloggy	188	Tullyhunco	Killashandra	Cavan
Cloghbally Lower	506	Castlerahan	Mullagh	Oldcastle
Cloghbally Upper	927	Castlerahan	Mullagh	Oldcastle
Cloghballybeg	545	Castlerahan	Mullagh	Kells
Cloghergoole	310	Castlerahan	Mullagh	Oldcastle
Cloghoge	152	Tullyhaw	Kinawley	Bawnboy
Cloghstuckagh	111	Tullygarvey	Drumgoon	Cootehill
Clonagonnell	258	Upper Loughtee	Kilmore	Cavan
Clonamullig	156	Lower Loughtee	Drumlane	Cavan
Clonandra	345	Tullygarvey	Annagh	Cavan
Clonarney	198	Castlerahan	Mullagh	Kells
Clonbockoge	154	Clanmahon	Kilbride	Oldcastle
Cloncollow	139	Lower Loughtee	Tomregan	Bawnboy
Clonconor Glebe	57	Upper Loughtee	Castleterra	Cavan
Cloncose	86	Tullyhunco	Kildallan	Cavan
Cloncose	103	Tullyhunco	Killashandra	Cavan
Cloncovet	1,126	Clanmahon	Drumlumman	Granard
Cloncurkney	151	Tullyhaw	Templeport	Bawnboy
Clondargan	79	Upper Loughtee	Larah	Cavan
Clondargan Glebe	69	Upper Loughtee	Larah	Cavan
Cloneary	142	Tullyhaw	Templeport	Bawnboy
Clonervy	414	Upper Loughtee	Castleterra	Cavan
Clonkeen	193	Tullyhunco	Kildallan	Bawnboy
Clonkeiffy	974	Castlerahan	Castlerahan	Oldcastle
Clonloaghan	693	Clanmahon	Drumlumman	Granard
Clonloskan	137	Upper Loughtee	Kilmore	Cavan
Clonmacmara	192	Castlerahan	Mullagh	Bailieborough
Clonmult	94	Clanmahon	Crosserlough	Cavan
Clonoose Big	376	Clanmahon	Drumlumman	Granard
Clonoose Little	260	Clanmahon	Drumlumman	Granard
Clonosey	367	Lower Loughtee	Annagh	Cavan
Clonraw	243	Clankee	Drumgoon	Cootehill
Clonturkan	173	Clankee	Enniskeen	Bailieborough
Clontycoo	94	Lower Loughtee	Drumlane	Cavan
Clontyduffy (Nugent)	200	Clanmahon	Kilbride	Oldcastle
Clontydully (Hart)	131	Clanmahon	Kilbride	Oldcastle
Clontycarnaghan	370	Tullyhaw	Templeport	Bawnboy
Clontygrigny	379	Tullyhunco	Kildallan	Bawnboy
Cloone	95	Tullyhunco	Scrabby	Granard
Clooneen	157	Tullyhunco	Kildallan	Cavan
Closnabraddan (or Taghart North)	431	Clankee	Enniskeen	Bailieborough
Cloverhill	88	Clankee	Bailieborough	Bailieborough
Cloverhill Demesne	297	Tullygarvey	Annagh	Cavan
Clowney	214	Lower Loughtee	Drumlane	Cavan
Clowninny	117	Lower Loughtee	Drumlane	Cavan
Cohaw	258	Tullygarvey	Drumgoon	Cootehill
Collops	531	Clankee	Enniskeen	Bailieborough
Commas (Kinawley)	2,564	Tullyhaw	Kinawley	Bawnboy
Commons, The (or Sralahan)	207	Tullyhaw	Tomregan	Bawnboy
Conaghoo	78	Tullygarvey	Annagh	Cootehill
Condry	139	Tullyhunco	Killashandra	Cavan
Conleen	103	Clanmahon	Kilbride	Oldcastle
Coolbane	199	Clanmahon	Ballintemple	Cavan
Coolboyoge	119	Upper Loughtee	Urney	Cavan
Coolcanadas	241	Tullygarvey	Annagh	Cootehill
Coolkill	427	Castlerahan	Crosserlough	Cavan
Coolnacarrick	148	Clanmahon	Ballintemple	Cavan
Coolnacola	221	Upper Loughtee	Killinkere	Bailieborough
Coolnagor (or Ricehill)	128	Upper Loughtee	Kilmore	Cavan
Coolnalitteragh	93	Tullygarvey	Annagh	Cavan
Coolnashinny (or Croaghan)	132	Tullyhunco	Kildallan	Cavan
Coologe	265	Tullyhaw	Templeport	Bawnboy
**Cootehill**	Town	Tullygarvey	Drumgoon	Cootehill
Coppanagh	806	Clankee	Enniskeen	Bailieborough
Coppanagh	88	Tullygarvey	Kildrumsherdan	Cootehill
Coppanagh Glebe	227	Castlerahan	Lurgan	Oldcastle
Coppanaghbane	228	Tullyhaw	Templeport	Enniskillen
Coppanaghmore	437	Tullyhaw	Templeport	Enniskillen
Cor, Templeport	153	Tullyhaw	Templeport	Bawnboy
Coragh	547	Lower Loughtee	Drumlane	Cavan
Coragh	128	Tullyhunco	Kildallan	Cavan
Coragh	117	Tullygarvey	Drumgoon	Cootehill
Coragh	289	Castlerahan	Lurgan	Oldcastle
Coragh Glebe	237	Tullyhunco	Killashandra	Bawnboy
Coraghmuck (or Greaghacholea)	281	Tullyhunco	Kildallan	Bawnboy
Coras Point	41	Upper Loughtee	Urney	Cavan
Corballyquill	290	Tullygarvey	Kildrumsherdan	Cootehill
Corbeagh	156	Clankee	Shercock	Bailieborough
Corbeagh	125	Castlerahan	Crosserlough	Cavan
Corbeagh	392	Tullygarvey	Kildrumsherdan	Cootehill
Corboy Glebe	141	Tullyhaw	Templeport	Bawnboy
Corcanadas	97	Lower Loughtee	Drumlane	Cavan
Corcashel	326	Tullygarvey	Annagh	Cavan
Corcashel	355	Tullyhaw	Killinagh	Cavan
Corclare	62	Clankee	Shercock	Bailieborough
Corcloghan	154	Upper Loughtee	Castleterra	Cavan
Corcloghan	139	Clankee	Drumgoon	Cootehill
Corcovety	182	Tullygarvey	Drung	Cootehill
Corcraff	160	Tullygarvey	Annagh	Cootehill
Corcraff	91	Tullygarvey	Drung	Cootehill
Corcreeghagh	122	Tullygarvey	Drumgoon	Cootehill
Cordalea	128	Upper Loughtee	Kilmore	Cavan
Cordevlis	178	Tullygarvey	Larah	Cootehill
Cordingin	270	Tullygarvey	Larah	Cootehill
Cordoagh	152	Clankee	Enniskeen	Bailieborough
Cordoagh	169	Clankee	Knockbride	Bailieborough
Cordoagh Glebe Upper	101	Tullygarvey	Kildrumsherdan	Cootehill
Cordoagh Lower	89	Tullygarvey	Kildrumsherdan	Cootehill
Cordonaghy	239	Tullyhunco	Scrabby	Cavan
Cordressogagh	169	Tullyhaw	Killinagh	Enniskillen
Corduff	778	Clanmahon	Ballintemple	Cavan
Corduff	134	Clanmahon	Crosserlough	Cavan
Corduff (or Cormore)	170	Tullyhunco	Scrabby	Cavan
Corfad	653	Castlerahan	Mullagh	Bailieborough
Corfad	346	Tullygarvey	Kildrumsherdan	Cootehill
Corfad	266	Upper Loughtee	Larah	Cootehill
Corfeehone	374	Tullygarvey	Larah	Cootehill
Corfree	373	Tullyhunco	Scrabby	Granard
Corgarran	62	Upper Loughtee	Kilmore	Cavan
Corgarry	122	Clankee	Enniskeen	Bailieborough
Corgarve	331	Upper Loughtee	Castleterra	Cavan
Corgarve (or Creeve)	73	Upper Loughtee	Castleterra	Cavan
Corglass	126	Clankee	Bailieborough	Bailieborough
Corglass	193	Clankee	Enniskeen	Bailieborough
Corglass	74	Upper Loughtee	Annagelliff	Cavan
Corglass	290	Clanmahon	Crosserlough	Cavan
Corglass	142	Upper Loughtee	Denn	Cavan
Corglass	221	Lower Loughtee	Drumlane	Cavan
Corglass	58	Tullygarvey	Drung	Cootehill
Corglass (or Rahan)	97	Castlerahan	Crosserlough	Bailieborough
Corgreagh	64	Lower Loughtee	Drumlane	Cavan
Corgreagh	138	Upper Loughtee	Larah	Cavan
Corgreagh	243	Tullygarvey	Kildrumsherdan	Cootehill
Corhanagh	359	Tullyhunco	Killashandra	Cavan
Corhoogan	62	Upper Loughtee	Annagelliff	Cavan
Corick	181	Tullygarvey	Kildrumsherdan	Cootehill
Corkish	681	Clankee	Bailieborough	Bailieborough
Corlaghaloo	162	Tullygarvey	Annagh	Cavan
Corlat	198	Castlerahan	Mullagh	Kells
Corlateerin	154	Castlerahan	Crosserlough	Cavan
Corlattycarroll	113	Clankee	Knockbride	Bailieborough
Corlattylannan	252	Clankee	Knockbride	Bailieborough
Corlea	360	Clankee	Enniskeen	Bailieborough
Corlea	140	Tullyhaw	Killinagh	Enniskillen
Corleck	202	Clankee	Knockbride	Bailieborough
Corleckagh Lower	105	Tullyhaw	Killinagh	Enniskillen
Corleckagh Upper	182	Tullyhaw	Killinagh	Enniskillen
Corleckduff	121	Clankee	Drumgoon	Cootehill
Corleggy	72	Lower Loughtee	Annagh	Cavan
Corlis	30	Tullyhunco	Killashandra	Cavan
Corlisalee	135	Upper Loughtee	Annagelliff	Cavan
Corlisbannan	258	Tullyhaw	Killinagh	Enniskillen
Corlisbrattan	453	Tullyhunco	Killashandra	Cavan
Corlislea	155	Clanmahon	Crosserlough	Cavan
Corlismore	214	Clanmahon	Ballintemple	Cavan
Corlough townland	209	Tullyhaw	Templeport	Bawnboy
Corlurgan	262	Clankee	Bailieborough	Bailieborough
Corlurgan	166	Upper Loughtee	Annagelliff	Cavan
Cormacmullan	61	Lower Loughtee	Annagh	Cavan
Cormaddyduff	84	Clanmahon	Drumlumman	Granard
Cormaddyduff	565	Castlerahan	Castlerahan	Oldcastle
Cormeen	200	Tullyhunco	Kildallan	Bawnboy
Cormeen	123	Clanmahon	Kilmore	Cavan
Cormeen	347	Tullygarvey	Larah	Cootehill
Cormeen	417	Castlerahan	Castlerahan	Oldcastle
Cormeen Glebe	254	Tullygarvey	Larah	Cootehill
Cormey	333	Clankee	Enniskeen	Bailieborough
Cormore (or Corduff)	170	Tullyhunco	Scrabby	Cavan
Cornabaste	165	Tullygarvey	Drung	Cootehill
Cornabeagh	117	Tullygarvey	Kildrumsherdan	Cootehill
Cornabraher	199	Tullygarvey	Kildrumsherdan	Cootehill
Cornacarrow	175	Tullygarvey	Drumgoon	Cootehill
Cornacarrow	122	Tullygarvey	Drung	Cootehill
Cornaclea (or Tawlagh)	63	Tullyhunco	Kildallan	Cavan
Cornacleigh	110	Tullyhaw	Templeport	Bawnboy
Cornacrea	130	Upper Loughtee	Kilmore	Cavan
Cornacreeve	156	Castlerahan	Castlerahan	Oldcastle
Cornacrum	246	Tullyhunco	Kildallan	Bawnboy
Cornadarragh	109	Lower Loughtee	Drumlane	Cavan
Cornadarragh (Pleydell)	98	Lower Loughtee	Drumlane	Cavan
Cornadimpan Glebe	152	Tullygarvey	Larah	Cootehill
Cornafean	151	Tullyhunco	Killashandra	Cavan
Cornagall	243	Tullygarvey	Drung	Cootehill
Cornagarrow	251	Tullygarvey	Drung	Cootehill
Cornagarrow	77	Tullygarvey	Kildrumsherdan	Cootehill
Cornagee	93	Clankee	Enniskeen	Bailieborough
Cornagee	430	Tullyhaw	Killinagh	Enniskillen
Cornaglare (or Palmira)	389	Castlerahan	Mullagh	Kells
Cornaglea Lower	165	Castlerahan	Mullagh	Bailieborough
Cornaglea Upper	167	Castlerahan	Mullagh	Bailieborough
Cornagleragh (or Oldtown)	126	Upper Loughtee	Annagelliff	Cavan
Cornagran (Kinawley)	89	Tullyhaw	Kinawley	Bawnboy
Cornagran	120	Tullyhunco	Scrabby	Granard
Cornagrow	247	Upper Loughtee	Denn	Cavan
Cornagrow	112	Lower Loughtee	Drumlane	Cavan
Cornagunleog	182	Tullyhaw	Templeport	Bawnboy
Cornahaia	139	Tullyhunco	Kildallan	Bawnboy
Cornahaw	425	Tullyhaw	Killinagh	Enniskillen
Cornahilt	169	Castlerahan	Castlerahan	Oldcastle
Cornakill	190	Clankee	Enniskeen	Bailieborough
Cornakill	260	Tullygarvey	Drung	Cootehill
Cornakill	531	Castlerahan	Mullagh	Kells
Cornakilly	216	Castlerahan	Castlerahan	Oldcastle
Cornalara	202	Clankee	Shercock	Bailieborough
Cornaleck	64	Lower Loughtee	Drumlane	Cavan
Cornaleen	101	Clankee	Shercock	Bailieborough
Cornalon	104	Tullyhaw	Kinawley	Bawnboy
Cornamagh	411	Clankee	Enniskeen	Bailieborough
Cornamahan	97	Clanmahon	Denn	Cavan
Cornaman	114	Clankee	Enniskeen	Bailieborough
Cornamucklagh	138	Clanmahon	Kilmore	Cavan
Cornamucklagh	130	Tullygarvey	Kildrumsherdan	Cootehill
Cornamucklagh	253	Tullyhunco	Scrabby	Granard
Cornamucklagh	178	Castlerahan	Castlerahan	Oldcastle
Cornanaff	261	Clankee	Bailieborough	Bailieborough
Cornanurney	238	Tullygarvey	Kildrumsherdan	Cootehill
Cornasaus	215	Clankee	Enniskeen	Bailieborough
Cornasaus	327	Tullygarvey	Kildrumsherdan	Cootehill
Cornaseer	223	Clanmahon	Denn	Cavan
Cornashesk	533	Castlerahan	Lurgan	Oldcastle
Cornasker	48	Tullyhunco	Kildallan	Bawnboy
Cornaslieve	526	Castlerahan	Lurgan	Oldcastle
Cornaveagh	256	Clankee	Knockbride	Bailieborough
Corneen	205	Tullyhaw	Templeport	Bawnboy
Corneenflynn	216	Tullyhaw	Templeport	Enniskillen
Corporation Lands	771	Lower Loughtee	Annagh	Cavan
Corr	374	Tullyhunco	Killashandra	Cavan
Corraback	193	Lower Loughtee	Drumlane	Cavan
Corracanvy	162	Upper Loughtee	Kilmore	Cavan
Corracarrow	165	Upper Loughtee	Lavey	Cavan
Corracholia Beg	83	Tullyhaw	Templeport	Bawnboy
Corracholia More	118	Tullyhaw	Templeport	Bawnboy
Corrachomera	336	Tullyhaw	Templeport	Bawnboy
Corraclassy	56	Tullyhaw	Templeport	Bawnboy
Corracleigh	128	Tullyhaw	Templeport	Enniskillen
Corracreeny	94	Upper Loughtee	Castleterra	Cavan
Corracreeny	71	Upper Loughtee	Urney	Cavan
Corradarren	369	Tullyhunco	Killashandra	Cavan
Corradeverrid	146	Tullyhaw	Killinagh	Enniskillen
Corradooa	123	Castlerahan	Killinkere	Bailieborough
Corradownan	281	Tullyhunco	Killashandra	Cavan
Corragarry	328	Clankee	Drumgoon	Cootehill
Corragho	331	Upper Loughtee	Lavey	Cavan
Corraghy	240	Clankee	Bailieborough	Bailieborough
Corraghy	150	Clankee	Shercock	Bailieborough
Corragloon	164	Castlerahan	Mullagh	Bailieborough
Corragvoy	199	Tullygarvey	Drung	Cootehill
Corrahoash	140	Tullyhaw	Killinagh	Enniskillen
Corrakane	66	Clanmahon	Denn	Cavan
Corrakeeldrum	593	Tullyhaw	Killinagh	Enniskillen
Corrakeeran	233	Clankee	Knockbride	Bailieborough
Corrakeeran	86	Tullygarvey	Drung	Cootehill
Corraleehanbeg	154	Tullyhaw	Drumreilly	Bawnboy
Corran, County Cavan	145	Tullyhaw	Templeport	Bawnboy
Corran	394	Tullyhunco	Killashandra	Cavan
Corranea Glebe	519	Tullyhunco	Killashandra	Cavan
Corranearty	90	Tullyhaw	Kinawley	Bawnboy
Corraneary	259	Clankee	Enniskeen	Bailieborough
Corraneary	335	Tullyhunco	Killashandra	Cavan
Corraneary	104	Upper Loughtee	Larah	Cavan
Corraneary	342	Clankee	Knockbride	Cootehill
Corraneden	174	Castlerahan	Killinkere	Bailieborough
Corranierna (Corlough)	60	Tullyhaw	Templeport	Bawnboy
Corranierna	176	Tullyhaw	Tomregan	Bawnboy
Corranure	231	Upper Loughtee	Castleterra	Cavan
Corraquigley	170	Tullyhaw	Killinagh	Enniskillen
Corraquill	244	Lower Loughtee	Drumlane	Bawnboy
Corrard	61	Tullyhaw	Killinagh	Enniskillen
Corrarod	260	Tullygarvey	Annagh	Cavan
Corrasmongan	116	Tullyhaw	Templeport	Bawnboy
Corratawy	348	Tullyhaw	Templeport	Enniskillen
Corratillan	179	Tullyhaw	Templeport	Bawnboy
Corratinner	334	Castlerahan	Killinkere	Bailieborough
Corratirrim	198	Tullyhaw	Killinagh	Enniskillen
Corratober	196	Upper Loughtee	Castleterra	Cavan
Corratober	153	Upper Loughtee	Kilmore	Cavan
Corratober	394	Tullyhunco	Scrabby	Granard
Corratober Lower	172	Tullyhaw	Killinagh	Enniskillen
Corratober Upper	197	Tullyhaw	Killinagh	Enniskillen
Corravahan	174	Tullygarvey	Drung	Cootehill
Corravarry	140	Upper Loughtee	Castleterra	Cavan
Corraveaty	45	Upper Loughtee	Kilmore	Cavan
Corravilla	559	Clankee	Knockbride	Bailieborough
Corravilla	223	Clankee	Shercock	Bailieborough
Corravoggy	272	Tullygarvey	Kildrumsherdan	Cootehill
Corravohy	80	Tullygarvey	Drung	Cootehill
Corrawaddy	151	Clankee	Enniskeen	Bailieborough
Corraweelis	481	Clankee	Enniskeen	Bailieborough
Corraweelis	292	Upper Loughtee	Denn	Cavan
Corraweelis	52	Tullygarvey	Drung	Cootehill
Corrawillin	79	Upper Loughtee	Lavey	Cavan
Correagh Glebe	279	Castlerahan	Lurgan	Oldcastle
Correvan	303	Tullyhaw	Killinagh	Enniskillen
Corrinshigo	189	Clankee	Enniskeen	Bailieborough
Corrinshigo	99	Tullygarvey	Drung	Cootehill
Corronagh	369	Castlerahan	Munterconnaught	Oldcastle
Corrycholman	158	Clankee	Enniskeen	Bailieborough
Corryrourke	389	Castlerahan	Mullagh	Bailieborough
Corstruce	88	Clanmahon	Kilmore	Cavan
Cortober	469	Clankee	Enniskeen	Bailieborough
Cortober	397	Tullygarvey	Kildrumsherdan	Cootehill
Cortrasna	107	Clanmahon	Drumlumman	Granard
Cortrasna (or Edergole)	189	Tullygarvey	Drung	Cootehill
Corweelis	130	Clankee	Knockbride	Bailieborough
Corweelis	265	Tullygarvey	Kildrumsherdan	Cootehill
Corweelis (or Lisaderg)	207	Tullygarvey	Drumgoon	Cootehill
Corwin	99	Clanmahon	Kilbride	Oldcastle
Coskemduff	280	Clankee	Drumgoon	Cootehill
Countenan	232	Upper Loughtee	Larah	Cavan
Crahard	81	Lower Loughtee	Annagh	Cavan
Cran	218	Clankee	Drumgoon	Cootehill
Cranaghan	494	Lower Loughtee	Tomregan	Cavan
Crannadillon	280	Castlerahan	Lurgan	Oldcastle
Creea	318	Tullyhaw	Templeport	Enniskillen
Creenagh Glebe	252	Tullyhunco	Killashandra	Cavan
Creenow	105	Castlerahan	Crosserlough	Cavan
Creeny	297	Lower Loughtee	Annagh	Cavan
Creeny	288	Lower Loughtee	Drumlane	Cavan
Creeve (or Corgarve)	73	Upper Loughtee	Castleterra	Cavan
Creighan	101	Upper Loughtee	Urney	Cavan
Crenard	120	Clanmahon	Kilmore	Cavan
Crilea	257	Clankee	Knockbride	Cootehill
Croaghan	442	Castlerahan	Munterconnaught	Oldcastle
Croaghan (or Coolnashinny)	132	Tullyhunco	Kildallan	Cavan
Crocklusty	103	Clankee	Shercock	Bailieborough
Crocknahattin	585	Clankee	Bailieborough	Bailieborough
Croley	222	Clankee	Shercock	Bailieborough
Cronery	188	Tullyhaw	Templeport	Bawnboy
Cross	126	Upper Loughtee	Castleterra	Cavan
Crossafehin	218	Castlerahan	Munterconnaught	Oldcastle
Crossbane	359	Castlerahan	Mullagh	Bailieborough
Crosscarn	71	Castlerahan	Mullagh	Kells
Crossdoney	32	Clanmahon	Kilmore	Cavan
Crosserlough	594	Castlerahan	Crosserlough	Cavan
Crosserule	310	Castlerahan	Castlerahan	Oldcastle
Crossmakeelan	265	Clankee	Shercock	Bailieborough
Crossmakelagher	196	Tullyhaw	Templeport	Bawnboy
Crossrah	218	Clanmahon	Kilbride	Oldcastle
Crossreagh	219	Castlerahan	Mullagh	Bailieborough
Crossreagh	97	Upper Loughtee	Castleterra	Cavan
Crover	389	Clanmahon	Ballymachugh	Cavan
Crubany	359	Upper Loughtee	Annagelliff	Cavan
Crumlin	142	Upper Loughtee	Annagelliff	Cavan
Crumlin	172	Upper Loughtee	Denn	Cavan
Cuilcagh	250	Castlerahan	Mullagh	Bailieborough
Cuillaghan	405	Lower Loughtee	Drumlane	Bawnboy
Cullaboy Lower	190	Clanmahon	Drumlumman	Granard
Cullaboy Upper	226	Clanmahon	Drumlumman	Granard
Cullentragh	192	Upper Loughtee	Castleterra	Cavan
Cullentragh	232	Tullygarvey	Drung	Cootehill
Culliagh	267	Tullyhaw	Templeport	Bawnboy
Cullies	279	Upper Loughtee	Annagelliff	Cavan
Cullies	342	Clankee	Knockbride	Cootehill
Cullin	77	Tullygarvey	Kildrumsherdan	Cootehill
Cullion (Kinawley)	372	Tullyhaw	Kinawley	Bawnboy
Cullow	111	Castlerahan	Crosserlough	Cavan
Cullyleenan	76	Tullyhaw	Tomregan	Bawnboy
Curracloghan	204	Castlerahan	Lurgan	Oldcastle
Curraghabreedin	139	Castlerahan	Crosserlough	Cavan
Curraghabweehan	54	Tullyhaw	Templeport	Bawnboy
Curraghanoe	140	Upper Loughtee	Castleterra	Cavan
Curraghglass	175	Tullyhaw	Templeport	Enniskillen
Curraghkeel	67	Castlerahan	Lurgan	Oldcastle
Curraghmore	208	Castlerahan	Lurgan	Oldcastle
Curragho	118	Upper Loughtee	Annagelliff	Cavan
Curraghvagh	398	Tullyhaw	Templeport	Enniskillen
Cuttragh	179	Upper Loughtee	Lavey	Cavan
Daggan	169	Upper Loughtee	Castleterra	Cavan
Danesfort Demesne (or Togher)	202	Upper Loughtee	Kilmore	Cavan
Darkley	447	Clankee	Shercock	Bailieborough
Deerpark	354	Castlerahan	Lurgan	Oldcastle
Denn Glebe	48	Upper Loughtee	Denn	Cavan
Dennbane	323	Upper Loughtee	Denn	Cavan
Dennmore (or Leggandenn)	445	Upper Loughtee	Denn	Cavan
Deralk	128	Lower Loughtee	Drumlane	Cavan
Deramfield	234	Lower Loughtee	Drumlane	Cavan
Derdis Lower	279	Upper Loughtee	Urney	Cavan
Derdis Upper	298	Upper Loughtee	Urney	Cavan
Derinish Beg	51	Upper Loughtee	Kilmore	Cavan
Derinish More	82	Upper Loughtee	Kilmore	Cavan
Dernaferst	193	Tullyhunco	Scrabby	Granard
Dernaglush	192	Lower Loughtee	Annagh	Cavan
Dernakesh	248	Clankee	Drumgoon	Cootehill
Dernaskeagh	192	Tullygarvey	Kildrumsherdan	Cootehill
Dernaweel	296	Tullyhunco	Killashandra	Cavan
Derreary	149	Lower Loughtee	Annagh	Cavan
Derreskit	332	Tullyhunco	Killashandra	Cavan
Derries	179	Clanmahon	Drumlumman	Granard
Derries Lower	246	Upper Loughtee	Kilmore	Cavan
Derries Upper	273	Upper Loughtee	Kilmore	Cavan
Derrin Lower	115	Clanmahon	Crosserlough	Cavan
Derrin Upper	67	Clanmahon	Crosserlough	Cavan
Derrindrehid	134	Tullyhunco	Killashandra	Cavan
Derrinlester	115	Tullyhunco	Kildallan	Bawnboy
Derrintinny	133	Lower Loughtee	Drumlane	Cavan
Derry	371	Clankee	Shercock	Bailieborough
Derry	288	Castlerahan	Crosserlough	Cavan
Derry	144	Tullyhunco	Killashandra	Cavan
Derry Beg	113	Tullyhaw	Templeport	Bawnboy
Derry More	126	Tullyhaw	Templeport	Bawnboy
Derryarmush	180	Lower Loughtee	Annagh	Cavan
Derrybrick	143	Lower Loughtee	Drumlane	Cavan
Derrycark	166	Lower Loughtee	Annagh	Cavan
Derrycassan	497	Tullyhaw	Templeport	Bawnboy
Derryconnessy	113	Tullyhaw	Templeport	Bawnboy
Derrycramph	169	Upper Loughtee	Urney	Cavan
Derrydamph	253	Clankee	Knockbride	Bailieborough
Derryevin	67	Castlerahan	Lurgan	Oldcastle
Derrygarra Lower	79	Upper Loughtee	Castleterra	Cavan
Derrygarra Upper	90	Upper Loughtee	Castleterra	Cavan
Derrygeeraghan	238	Lower Loughtee	Drumlane	Cavan
Derrygid	190	Tullyhunco	Killashandra	Cavan
Derrygid	185	Upper Loughtee	Urney	Cavan
Derryginny	125	Tullyhaw	Tomregan	Bawnboy
Derryglen	216	Upper Loughtee	Lavey	Cavan
Derrygoss	147	Upper Loughtee	Urney	Cavan
Derryheen	327	Upper Loughtee	Urney	Cavan
Derryhoo	221	Tullygarvey	Annagh	Cavan
Derryhoo	246	Lower Loughtee	Drumlane	Cavan
Derryhum	430	Upper Loughtee	Killinkere	Bailieborough
Derrylahan	417	Castlerahan	Crosserlough	Cavan
Derrylahan	910	Tullyhaw	Templeport	Enniskillen
Derrylane	57	Clanmahon	Ballintemple	Cavan
Derrylane	178	Tullyhunco	Killashandra	Cavan
Derrylea	287	Castlerahan	Crosserlough	Oldcastle
Derryleague	125	Upper Loughtee	Urney	Cavan
Derrylinn	99	Upper Loughtee	Urney	Cavan
Derrylurgan	480	Castlerahan	Denn	Oldcastle
Derryna	133	Upper Loughtee	Kilmore	Cavan
Derrynacreeve	122	Tullyhaw	Templeport	Bawnboy
Derrynacross	169	Tullyhunco	Killashandra	Cavan
Derrynagan	83	Upper Loughtee	Kilmore	Cavan
Derrynalester	125	Tullyhaw	Killinagh	Enniskillen
Derrynananta Lower	789	Tullyhaw	Templeport	Enniskillen
Derrynananta Upper	1,089	Tullyhaw	Templeport	Enniskillen
Derrynaseer	155	Tullyhaw	Killinagh	Enniskillen
Derrynaslieve	94	Tullyhaw	Templeport	Bawnboy
Derrynatuan	185	Tullyhaw	Templeport	Enniskillen
Derrynure	245	Clankee	Bailieborough	Bailieborough
Derryola	89	Tullygarvey	Annagh	Cavan
Derryragh	207	Tullyhaw	Templeport	Bawnboy
Derryrealt	250	Tullyhaw	Kinawley	Bawnboy
Derryvackney	213	Lower Loughtee	Drumlane	Cavan
Derryvahan	109	Tullyhaw	Templeport	Bawnboy
Derryvehil	140	Lower Loughtee	Drumlane	Cavan
Derryvella (Corlough)	112	Tullyhaw	Templeport	Bawnboy
Derryvony	407	Lower Loughtee	Drumlane	Cavan
Derrywinny	104	Upper Loughtee	Kilmore	Cavan
Devally	69	Tullygarvey	Drung	Cootehill
Diamondhill (or Drumcartagh)	69	Tullyhunco	Kildallan	Bawnboy
Dillagh	254	Clanmahon	Ballintemple	Cavan
Dingin	112	Clankee	Enniskeen	Bailieborough
Dingins	306	Tullyhunco	Scrabby	Cavan
Dinginvanty	226	Tullygarvey	Kildrumsherdan	Cootehill
Disert, Tullyhunco	105	Tullyhunco	Kildallan	Cavan
Doocarrick	332	Tullygarvey	Kildrumsherdan	Cootehill
Doocassan	186	Tullygarvey	Drung	Cootehill
Doogary	318	Tullyhunco	Kildallan	Bawnboy
Doohallat	188	Clankee	Drumgoon	Cootehill
Doon	339	Castlerahan	Mullagh	Bailieborough
Doon (Drumreilly)	1,189	Tullyhaw	Drumreilly	Bawnboy
Doon, Tomregan	110	Tullyhaw	Tomregan	Bawnboy
Dooreagh	533	Clankee	Drumgoon	Cootehill
Dowra	311	Tullyhaw	Killinagh	Enniskillen
Dreenan	88	Upper Loughtee	Kilmore	Cavan
Dresternagh	312	Tullygarvey	Annagh	Cootehill
Dring	182	Tullyhunco	Kildallan	Bawnboy
Droghill	138	Upper Loughtee	Drumlane	Cavan
Drokaghbane	198	Clankee	Drumgoon	Cootehill
Dromore	443	Clankee	Bailieborough	Bailieborough
Drumerdannan	142	Tullyhunco	Kildallan	Cavan
Drumacachon	168	Tullygarvey	Drung	Cootehill
Drumacarrow	516	Clankee	Bailieborough	Bailieborough
Drumacleeskin	138	Tullygarvey	Drung	Cootehill
Drumacon	266	Upper Loughtee	Drumlane	Cavan
Drumacullion	156	Clankee	Knockbride	Cootehill
Drumad	359	Clankee	Shercock	Bailieborough
Drumagolan	518	Castlerahan	Killinkere	Oldcastle
Drumahurk	69	Upper Loughtee	Castleterra	Cavan
Drumakeenan	132	Tullygarvey	Annagh	Cavan
Drumakinneo	201	Clanmahon	Crosserlough	Cavan
Drumalee	85	Upper Loughtee	Annagelliff	Cavan
Drumalee	280	Tullygarvey	Annagh	Cavan
Drumalee	98	Lower Loughtee	Drumlane	Cavan
Drumalee	192	Upper Loughtee	Urney	Cavan
Drumalla (or Feugh (Bishops))	272	Lower Loughtee	Drumlane	Cavan
Drumalt	251	Tullyhunco	Killashandra	Cavan
Drumalure Beg	95	Lower Loughtee	Annagh	Cavan
Drumalure More	205	Lower Loughtee	Annagh	Cavan
Drumamry	116	Tullyhunco	Killashandra	Cavan
Drumamuck Glebe	243	Clankee	Knockbride	Bailieborough
Drumanalaragh	160	Upper Loughtee	Crosserlough	Cavan
Drumane	147	Tullyhaw	Templeport	Bawnboy
Drumanespick	777	Clankee	Bailieborough	Bailieborough
Drumaraw	149	Upper Loughtee	Castleterra	Cavan
Drumard	98	Clanmahon	Ballintemple	Cavan
Drumard	292	Upper Loughtee	Kilmore	Cavan
Drumasladdy	193	Lower Loughtee	Drumlane	Cavan
Drumauna	227	Tullygarvey	Drung	Cootehill
Drumavaddy	160	Tullygarvey	Annagh	Cavan
Drumavaddy	114	Lower Loughtee	Annagh	Cavan
Drumavaddy	336	Clanmahon	Denn	Cavan
Drumavanagh	84	Upper Loughtee	Urney	Cavan
Drumaveil North	72	Tullygarvey	Drumgoon	Cootehill
Drumaveil South	276	Clankee	Drumgoon	Cootehill
Drumavrack	172	Tullygarvey	Annagh	Cootehill
Drumbagh	48	Tullyhunco	Kildallan	Cavan
Drumbannan	452	Clankee	Bailieborough	Bailieborough
Drumbannow	111	Clanmahon	Drumlumman	Granard
Drumbar	131	Clankee	Enniskeen	Bailieborough
Drumbar	120	Clankee	Knockbride	Bailieborough
Drumbar (Kinawley)	306	Tullyhaw	Kinawley	Bawnboy
Drumbar	44	Clanmahon	Kilmore	Cavan
Drumbar	43	Upper Loughtee	Urney	Cavan
Drumbarkey	139	Tullygarvey	Drumgoon	Cootehill
Drumbarlom	204	Lower Loughtee	Drumlane	Cavan
Drumbarry	286	Upper Loughtee	Denn	Cavan
Drumbartagh	127	Tullygarvey	Annagh	Cootehill
Drumbeagh	188	Tullyhaw	Templeport	Bawnboy
Drumbee	274	Castlerahan	Crosserlough	Cavan
Drumberry	105	Tullyhunco	Killashandra	Cavan
Drumbess	584	Tullyhunco	Killashandra	Cavan
Drumbinnis	90	Tullyhunco	Kildallan	Bawnboy
Drumbinnis	369	Clankee	Knockbride	Cootehill
Drumbo	290	Upper Loughtee	Annagelliff	Cavan
Drumbo (Tullyhunco)	156	Tullyhunco	Kildallan	Cavan
Drumbo	94	Tullygarvey	Annagh	Cootehill
Drumboory	177	Tullyhaw	Kinawley	Bawnboy
Drumbrade	149	Clanmahon	Ballintemple	Cavan
Drumbrade	244	Tullygarvey	Drumgoon	Cootehill
Drumbrawn	452	Tullygarvey	Annagh	Cavan
Drumbriskan	177	Tullyhunco	Scrabby	Granard
Drumbrollisk	198	Tullygarvey	Drung	Cootehill
Drumbrucklis	309	Clanmahon	Ballintemple	Cavan
Drumbrucklis	134	Clanmahon	Drumlumman	Granard
Drumbrughas	195	Tullyhaw	Kinawley	Bawnboy
Drumbrughas	249	Lower Loughtee	Drumlane	Cavan
Drumbullion	241	Tullyhunco	Killashandra	Cavan
Drumcalpin	170	Lower Loughtee	Annagh	Cavan
Drumcalpin	215	Upper Loughtee	Castleterra	Cavan
Drumcalpin	332	Tullygarvey	Larah	Cootehill
Drumcanon	81	Tullyhunco	Kildallan	Bawnboy
Drumcanon (Kinawley)	73	Tullyhaw	Kinawley	Bawnboy
Drumcanon	104	Upper Loughtee	Denn	Cavan
Drumcar (Kinawley)	74	Tullyhaw	Kinawley	Bawnboy
Drumcarban	358	Clanmahon	Kilmore	Cavan
Drumcarey	244	Tullyhunco	Killashandra	Cavan
Drumcarn	284	Tullygarvey	Annagh	Cootehill
Drumcartagh (or Diamondhill)	69	Tullyhunco	Kildallan	Bawnboy
Drumcase	84	Tullyhunco	Kildallan	Cavan
Drumcask	298	Tullyhaw	Kinawley	Bawnboy
Drumcassidy	162	Castlerahan	Crosserlough	Cavan
Drumchoe	266	Tullygarvey	Drung	Cootehill
Drumcoghill Lower	126	Tullyhunco	Killashandra	Cavan
Drumcoghill Upper	124	Tullyhunco	Killashandra	Cavan
Drumcole	225	Lower Loughtee	Drumlane	Cavan
Drumcon	102	Tullyhunco	Killashandra	Cavan
Drumcon	61	Upper Loughtee	Kilmore	Cavan
Drumcondra	195	Clankee	Drumgoon	Cootehill
Drumconlester	97	Tullyhunco	Killashandra	Cavan
Drumconnick	227	Upper Loughtee	Urney	Cavan
Drumconra	116	Tullygarvey	Annagh	Cootehill
Drumconra (or Lowforge)	189	Tullyhaw	Kinawley	Bawnboy
Drumcor	374	Clanmahon	Drumlumman	Cavan
Drumcor	108	Upper Loughtee	Kilmore	Cavan
Drumcor	316	Tullygarvey	Drung	Cootehill
Drumcrauve	197	Upper Loughtee	Annagelliff	Cavan
Drumcrin	158	Clankee	Enniskeen	Bailieborough
Drumcrow	499	Lower Loughtee	Annagh	Cavan
Drumcrow	97	Upper Loughtee	Castleterra	Cavan
Drumcrow	141	Clanmahon	Denn	Cavan
Drumcrow	548	Clanmahon	Kilmore	Cavan
Drumcrow	176	Upper Loughtee	Larah	Cavan
Drumcrow North	125	Tullyhunco	Killashandra	Cavan
Drumcrow South	292	Tullyhunco	Killashandra	Cavan
Drumcullion	86	Tullyhaw	Kinawley	Bawnboy
Drumcullion	166	Tullyhunco	Killashandra	Cavan
Drumderg	73	Castlerahan	Lurgan	Oldcastle
Drumderg Glebe	43	Castlerahan	Lurgan	Oldcastle
Drumeague	419	Clankee	Knockbride	Bailieborough
Drumederglass	96	Castlerahan	Killinkere	Bailieborough
Drumeena	251	Tullygarvey	Annagh	Cootehill
Drumeeny	56	Clanmahon	Ballymachugh	Cavan
Drumegil	206	Castlerahan	Crosserlough	Cavan
Drumelis	266	Upper Loughtee	Urney	Cavan
Drumellis	123	Lower Loughtee	Annagh	Cavan
Drumeltan	242	Tullygarvey	Kildrumsherdan	Cootehill
Drumerkillew	563	Tullygarvey	Kildrumsherdan	Cootehill
Drumersee	317	Tullyhaw	Kinawley	Bawnboy
Drumersnaw	101	Clanmahon	Drumlumman	Granard
Drumestagh	182	Upper Loughtee	Lavey	Cavan
Drumfomina	267	Castlerahan	Killinkere	Bailieborough
Drumgallon	173	Tullygarvey	Drung	Cootehill
Drumgart	136	Lower Loughtee	Drumlane	Cavan
Drumgerd	83	Tullyhunco	Killashandra	Cavan
Drumgesh	172	Lower Loughtee	Drumlane	Cavan
Drumgill	192	Tullygarvey	Kildrumsherdan	Cootehill
Drumgoa	125	Tullyhunco	Killashandra	Cavan
Drumgoohy	104	Tullyhunco	Kildallan	Bawnboy
Drumgola	156	Upper Loughtee	Urney	Cavan
Drumgoney	182	Tullygarvey	Larah	Cootehill
Drumgoon	286	Tullyhunco	Killashandra	Cavan
Drumgoon	210	Clankee	Drumgoon	Cootehill
Drumgor	38	Upper Loughtee	Kilmore	Cavan
Drumgora	177	Upper Loughtee	Lavey	Cavan
Drumgora	278	Castlerahan	Lurgan	Oldcastle
Drumgore	341	Clanmahon	Drumlumman	Granard
Drumgorry	152	Tullygarvey	Annagh	Cavan
Drumgreen	48	Tullygarvey	Drumgoon	Cootehill
Drumgur	98	Tullygarvey	Larah	Cootehill
Drumhallagh	63	Castlerahan	Crosserlough	Cavan
Drumhallagh	159	Tullygarvey	Larah	Cootehill
Drumharid	231	Upper Loughtee	Castleterra	Cavan
Drumhart	253	Tullyhunco	Killashandra	Cavan
Drumhawnagh	431	Clanmahon	Drumlumman	Granard
Drumhawragh	573	Clanmahon	Drumlumman	Granard
Drumhecknagh	142	Upper Loughtee	Kilmore	Cavan
Drumhell	57	Lower Loughtee	Drumlane	Cavan
Drumhell	246	Upper Loughtee	Kilmore	Cavan
Drumhell	184	Castlerahan	Lurgan	Oldcastle
Drumherriff	175	Lower Loughtee	Drumlane	Cavan
Drumherriff North	48	Tullygarvey	Drung	Cootehill
Drumherriff South	169	Tullygarvey	Drung	Cootehill
Drumherrish	36	Upper Loughtee	Castleterra	Cavan
Drumhillagh	140	Clanmahon	Ballintemple	Cavan
Drumhillagh	136	Tullyhunco	Killashandra	Cavan
Drumhillagh	181	Upper Loughtee	Lavey	Cavan
Drumhillagh	176	Tullyhunco	Scrabby	Cavan
Drumhillagh	203	Tullygarvey	Drung	Cootehill
Drumhillagh	187	Clankee	Knockbride	Cootehill
Drumhillagh North	371	Clankee	Knockbride	Bailieborough
Drumhillagh South	291	Clankee	Knockbride	Bailieborough
Drumhirk	129	Upper Loughtee	Denn	Cavan
Drumhirk	370	Upper Loughtee	Lavey	Cavan
Drumhirk	161	Tullygarvey	Kildrumsherdan	Cootehill
Drumhome	74	Upper Loughtee	Castleterra	Cavan
Drumhose	162	Tullygarvey	Kildrumsherdan	Cootehill
Drumhurrin	373	Tullyhaw	Templeport	Enniskillen
Drumhurt	245	Tullygarvey	Kildrumsherdan	Cootehill
Drumiller	215	Clankee	Enniskeen	Bailieborough
Druminisclin	153	Tullygarvey	Annagh	Cavan
Druminisclin	162	Castlerahan	Crosserlough	Cavan
Druminiskill	152	Tullyhunco	Kildallan	Bawnboy
Druminnick	77	Clankee	Knockbride	Cootehill
Drumkeen	79	Upper Loughtee	Annagelliff	Cavan
Drumkeen	40	Lower Loughtee	Drumlane	Cavan
Drumkeeran	86	Upper Loughtee	Castleterra	Cavan
Drumkeeran Beg	106	Tullyhunco	Killashandra	Cavan
Drumkeeran Black	139	Tullyhunco	Killashandra	Cavan
Drumkeeran More	138	Tullyhunco	Killashandra	Cavan
Drumkeery	176	Clankee	Bailieborough	Bailieborough
Drumkerril	67	Lower Loughtee	Drumlane	Cavan
Drumkilly	230	Clanmahon	Crosserlough	Cavan
Drumkilroosk	288	Tullyhunco	Killashandra	Cavan
Drumlane	212	Lower Loughtee	Drumlane	Cavan
Drumlane	306	Tullygarvey	Larah	Cootehill
Drumlarah	193	Tullyhunco	Kildallan	Bawnboy
Drumlark	145	Upper Loughtee	Annagelliff	Cavan
Drumlarney	138	Tullyhunco	Killashandra	Cavan
Drumlaunaght	89	Upper Loughtee	Larah	Cavan
Drumlaunaght	38	Upper Loughtee	Urney	Cavan
Drumlaydan	123	Tullyhaw	Templeport	Bawnboy
Drumleague	223	Tullygarvey	Kildrumsherdan	Cootehill
Drumleny	137	Upper Loughtee	Kilmore	Cavan
Drumliff	456	Upper Loughtee	Castleterra	Cavan
Drumliff	122	Upper Loughtee	Denn	Cavan
Drumlion	169	Clanmahon	Ballintemple	Cavan
Drumlion	88	Upper Loughtee	Kilmore	Cavan
Drumloaghan	102	Tullygarvey	Kildrumsherdan	Cootehill
Drumlom	208	Clankee	Shercock	Bailieborough
Drumloman	300	Castlerahan	Crosserlough	Cavan
Drumlon	205	Clankee	Bailieborough	Bailieborough
Drumlougher	338	Tullyhaw	Templeport	Bawnboy
Drumlougher	551	Lower Loughtee	Drumlane	Cavan
Drumlumman	158	Clankee	Drumgoon	Cootehill
Drummallaght	737	Castlerahan	Killinkere	Bailieborough
Drumman	111	Tullygarvey	Drumgoon	Cootehill
Drummanbane	247	Upper Loughtee	Lavey	Cavan
Drummanduff	406	Upper Loughtee	Lavey	Cavan
Drummany	177	Tullyhunco	Kildallan	Bawnboy
Drummany	107	Tullygarvey	Annagh	Cavan
Drummany	105	Upper Loughtee	Castleterra	Cavan
Drummany	194	Tullyhunco	Killashandra	Cavan
Drummany (Pleydell)	184	Lower Loughtee	Drumlane	Cavan
Drummany Beg	43	Lower Loughtee	Drumlane	Cavan
Drummany Glebe	125	Lower Loughtee	Drumlane	Cavan
Drummany Montiaghs	116	Lower Loughtee	Drumlane	Cavan
Drummany Rahan	135	Lower Loughtee	Drumlane	Cavan
Drummartin	148	Tullygarvey	Kildrumsherdan	Cootehill
Drummeva	225	Clankee	Knockbride	Bailieborough
Drumminick	163	Tullygarvey	Larah	Cavan
Drumminnion	123	Tullyhunco	Kildallan	Bawnboy
Drummole	197	Tullygarvey	Larah	Cootehill
Drummoney	264	Castlerahan	Lurgan	Oldcastle
Drummonum	296	Upper Loughtee	Urney	Cavan
Drummora Great	279	Upper Loughtee	Kilmore	Cavan
Drummora Little	127	Upper Loughtee	Kilmore	Cavan
Drummoy	106	Tullygarvey	Annagh	Cavan
Drummuck	235	Upper Loughtee	Larah	Cavan
Drummullagh	124	Lower Loughtee	Drumlane	Cavan
Drummullan	103	Upper Loughtee	Kilmore	Cavan
Drummullig	119	Upper Loughtee	Urney	Cavan
Drummully (or Oakwood)	182	Upper Loughtee	Castleterra	Cavan
Drummully East	215	Tullyhunco	Kildallan	Cavan
Drummully West	113	Tullyhunco	Kildallan	Cavan
Drummurry	158	Upper Loughtee	Kilmore	Cavan
Drummury	221	Tullygarvey	Kildrumsherdan	Cootehill
Drumnagar	208	Tullygarvey	Larah	Cootehill
Drumnagran	356	Tullygarvey	Kildrumsherdan	Cootehill
Drumnagress	264	Tullygarvey	Kildrumsherdan	Cootehill
Drumnalaragh	246	Clanmahon	Crosserlough	Cavan
Drumnanarragh	220	Upper Loughtee	Larah	Cavan
Drumnasreane	61	Tullygarvey	Drung	Cootehill
Drumnatread	449	Tullygarvey	Kildrumsherdan	Cootehill
Drumnaveagh	399	Upper Loughtee	Lavey	Cavan
Drumnavrick	120	Clanmahon	Ballymachugh	Cavan
Drumnawall	159	Tullyhunco	Killashandra	Cavan
Drumnoose	199	Lower Loughtee	Drumlane	Cavan
Drumod Glebe	77	Tullyhaw	Kinawley	Bawnboy
Drumoghra	84	Upper Loughtee	Annagelliff	Cavan
Drumohan	103	Upper Loughtee	Castleterra	Cavan
Drumoosclin	322	Clankee	Bailieborough	Bailieborough
Drumpeak	2,551	Clankee	Enniskeen	Bailieborough
Drumquill	54	Lower Loughtee	Drumlane	Cavan
Drumrane	185	Tullygarvey	Drung	Cootehill
Drumrat	142	Castlerahan	Mullagh	Bailieborough
Drumrat	152	Tullygarvey	Larah	Cootehill
Drumrath	207	Clanmahon	Crosserlough	Cavan
Drumrockady	177	Tullyhunco	Killashandra	Cavan
Drumroe	174	Tullyhunco	Killashandra	Cavan
Drumrooghill	224	Tullygarvey	Drumgoon	Cootehill
Drumroosk	290	Clanmahon	Ballintemple	Cavan
Drumroosk	105	Tullyhunco	Killashandra	Cavan
Drumroosk (or Thomascourt)	59	Upper Loughtee	Kilmore	Cavan
Drumroragh	609	Castlerahan	Crosserlough	Cavan
Drumrush	159	Lower Loughtee	Drumlane	Cavan
Drumryan	52	Upper Loughtee	Castleterra	Cavan
Drumsallagh	149	Clankee	Enniskeen	Bailieborough
Drumscruddan	375	Castlerahan	Crosserlough	Cavan
Drumsheil	208	Tullygarvey	Kildrumsherdan	Cootehill
Drumshinny	194	Tullyhunco	Killashandra	Cavan
Drumsillagh	242	Upper Loughtee	Castleterra	Cavan
Drumsillagh	171	Tullygarvey	Kildrumsherdan	Cootehill
Drumsivney	68	Tullygarvey	Kildrumsherdan	Cootehill
Drumskelt	148	Tullygarvey	Drung	Cootehill
Drumskerry	133	Clankee	Enniskeen	Bailieborough
Drumury	169	Clanmahon	Ballintemple	Cavan
Drumyouth	201	Tullyhunco	Killashandra	Cavan
Drung	231	Tullygarvey	Drung	Cootehill
Drutamon	239	Clankee	Drumgoon	Cootehill
Drutamy	217	Castlerahan	Killinkere	Bailieborough
Druumskeagh	50	Upper Loughtee	Kilmore	Cavan
Duckfield	295	Tullyhaw	Killinagh	Enniskillen
Duffcastle	182	Castlerahan	Crosserlough	Cavan
Dunancory	288	Castlerahan	Lurgan	Oldcastle
Dunaree	348	Clankee	Enniskeen	Bailieborough
Dunaweel	651	Tullyhunco	Killashandra	Cavan
Duncollog	138	Tullygarvey	Drung	Cootehill
Dundavan	216	Clanmahon	Drumlumman	Granard
Dundragon	114	Clankee	Bailieborough	Bailieborough
Duneena	176	Clankee	Bailieborough	Bailieborough
Dung	186	Tullygarvey	Drumgoon	Cootehill
Dunglave	143	Tullyhaw	Kinawley	Bawnboy
Dungonnan	132	Tullygarvey	Drung	Cootehill
Dungummin Lower	297	Clanmahon	Kilbride	Oldcastle
Dungummin Upper	704	Clanmahon	Kilbride	Oldcastle
Dunmakeever	1,233	Tullyhaw	Kinawley	Enniskillen
Dunmurry	79	Tullygarvey	Drung	Cootehill
Dunrora	44	Tullygarvey	Annagh	Cavan
Eaglehill	101	Tullyhaw	Templeport	Bawnboy
Edenburt	1,096	Castlerahan	Loughan or Castlekeeran	Oldcastle
Edenmore	716	Tullyhaw	Killinagh	Enniskillen
Edennagully	321	Clankee	Enniskeen	Bailieborough
Edenterriff	116	Lower Loughtee	Annagh	Cavan
Edenticlare	305	Upper Loughtee	Annagelliff	Cavan
Edergole	173	Upper Loughtee	Larah	Cavan
Edergole (or Cortrasna)	189	Tullygarvey	Drung	Cootehill
Edermin	77	Upper Loughtee	Urney	Cavan
Edrans	213	Tullygarvey	Drung	Cootehill
Egramush	200	Upper Loughtee	Castleterra	Cavan
Eighter	718	Castlerahan	Munterconnaught	Oldcastle
Elteen	103	Upper Loughtee	Castleterra	Cavan
Enagh	159	Clankee	Knockbride	Bailieborough
Enagh	179	Castlerahan	Mullagh	Bailieborough
Enagh	88	Tullygarvey	Kildrumsherdan	Cootehill
Enagh	346	Castlerahan	Castlerahan	Oldcastle
Enagh	198	Clanmahon	Kilbride	Oldcastle
Enagh	359	Castlerahan	Loughan or Castlekeeran	Oldcastle
Enniskeen	271	Clankee	Enniskeen	Bailieborough
Eonish	245	Upper Loughtee	Kilmore	Cavan
Erraran	155	Tullyhaw	Templeport	Bawnboy
Errigal	170	Tullygarvey	Kildrumsherdan	Cootehill
Eshveagh	439	Tullyhaw	Kinawley	Enniskillen
Evlagh Beg	166	Tullyhunco	Kildallan	Bawnboy
Evlagh More	140	Tullyhunco	Kildallan	Bawnboy
Faharlagh	94	Lower Loughtee	Annagh	Cavan
Farnham	418	Upper Loughtee	Urney	Cavan
Farragh	118	Upper Loughtee	Kilmore	Cavan
Farragh	99	Castlerahan	Denn	Oldcastle
Farrangarve	435	Tullyhunco	Killashandra	Cavan
Farranseer	336	Tullyhunco	Killashandra	Cavan
Farranydaly	237	Upper Loughtee	Kilmore	Cavan
Fartadreen	244	Castlerahan	Killinkere	Bailieborough
Fartagh	141	Clankee	Knockbride	Cootehill
Fartagh	604	Castlerahan	Loughan or Castlekeeran	Oldcastle
Fartan Lower	147	Upper Loughtee	Castleterra	Cavan
Fartan Upper	84	Upper Loughtee	Castleterra	Cavan
Fartrin	281	Lower Loughtee	Tomregan	Bawnboy
Feaugh	179	Upper Loughtee	Lavey	Cavan
Feedarragh	104	Lower Loughtee	Drumlane	Cavan
Feugh (Bishops) (or Drumalla)	272	Lower Loughtee	Drumlane	Cavan
Feugh (Maxwell)	166	Lower Loughtee	Drumlane	Cavan
Finaghoo	285	Tullyhaw	Kinawley	Bawnboy
Finaway	347	Castlerahan	Crosserlough	Cavan
Fintawan	258	Castlerahan	Lurgan	Oldcastle
Finternagh	295	Castlerahan	Killinkere	Bailieborough
Foalies	46	Lower Loughtee	Drumlane	Cavan
Forthenry (or Largy)	346	Tullygarvey	Kildrumsherdan	Cootehill
Forthill	212	Tullyhunco	Scrabby	Cavan
Fortland	350	Clanmahon	Ballymachugh	Cavan
Freeduff	310	Clanmahon	Drumlumman	Granard
Furnaceland	364	Tullyhaw	Kinawley	Bawnboy
Galbolie	433	Clankee	Bailieborough	Bailieborough
Gallon	193	Castlerahan	Killinkere	Bailieborough
Gallon Etra	200	Clankee	Knockbride	Cootehill
Gallon Glebe	61	Upper Loughtee	Denn	Cavan
Gallonbane	128	Clanmahon	Kilbride	Cavan
Gallonboy	89	Clankee	Enniskeen	Bailieborough
Gallonbulloge (or Black Bull)	45	Upper Loughtee	Denn	Cavan
Galloncurra	107	Castlerahan	Killinkere	Bailieborough
Gallonnambraher	274	Castlerahan	Lurgan	Oldcastle
Gallonreagh	146	Clanmahon	Kilbride	Cavan
Gallonreagh	101	Clankee	Drumgoon	Cootehill
Garfiny	182	Lower Loughtee	Drumlane	Cavan
Garrison	84	Clanmahon	Ballymachugh	Cavan
Garryfliugh	305	Tullyhaw	Drumreilly	Bawnboy
Garrymore	580	Clanmahon	Ballintemple	Cavan
Garrynogher	143	Castlerahan	Crosserlough	Oldcastle
Garryross	333	Castlerahan	Castlerahan	Oldcastle
Garrysallagh (D'Arcy)	151	Clanmahon	Kilbride	Oldcastle
Garrysallagh (O'Reilly)	169	Clanmahon	Kilbride	Oldcastle
Gartacara	98	Lower Loughtee	Drumlane	Cavan
Gartaquill	363	Lower Loughtee	Drumlane	Cavan
Gartbrattan	106	Lower Loughtee	Drumlane	Cavan
Gartbrattan	264	Upper Loughtee	Kilmore	Cavan
Gartinardress	324	Tullyhunco	Killashandra	Cavan
Gartnaneane	701	Clankee	Bailieborough	Bailieborough
Gartnanoul	246	Upper Loughtee	Kilmore	Cavan
Gartnasillagh	173	Upper Loughtee	Urney	Cavan
Gartylough	260	Tullyhunco	Killashandra	Cavan
Garvagh	757	Tullyhaw	Killinagh	Enniskillen
Garvalt Lower	238	Tullyhaw	Templeport	Enniskillen
Garvalt Upper (or Gub)	201	Tullyhaw	Templeport	Enniskillen
Garvary (Corlough)	109	Tullyhaw	Templeport	Bawnboy
Garvesk	286	Tullyhaw	Killinagh	Enniskillen
Glascarrick	294	Clanmahon	Drumlumman	Granard
Glasdrumman	195	Upper Loughtee	Annagelliff	Cavan
Glasdrumman	158	Tullygarvey	Annagh	Cootehill
Glasdrumman	412	Clankee	Knockbride	Cootehill
Glasstown (or Port)	118	Tullyhunco	Kildallan	Cavan
Glebe	20	Clanmahon	Ballymachugh	Cavan
Glebe	39	Tullygarvey	Drumgoon	Cootehill
Glebe	53	Castlerahan	Mullagh	Kells
Glebe	3	Castlerahan	Mullagh	Kells
Glen	102	Lower Loughtee	Drumlane	Cavan
Glencorran	450	Upper Loughtee	Kilmore	Cavan
Gneeve	222	Clanmahon	Kilbride	Oldcastle
Gola	271	Castlerahan	Killinkere	Bailieborough
Gortacashel	90	Tullyhaw	Kinawley	Bawnboy
Gortachurk	37	Clanmahon	Crosserlough	Cavan
Gortachurk	105	Clanmahon	Kilmore	Cavan
Gortaclogher	253	Tullyhaw	Templeport	Bawnboy
Gortaquill	109	Tullyhaw	Killinagh	Enniskillen
Gortawee (or Scotchtown)	137	Tullyhaw	Tomregan	Bawnboy
Gorteen (Kinawley)	137	Tullyhaw	Kinawley	Bawnboy
Gorteen, Templeport	104	Tullyhaw	Templeport	Bawnboy
Gorteen (Gorteenagarry)	153	Tullyhunco	Kildallan	Cavan
Gorteen (or Gorteenaterriff)	345	Tullyhunco	Killashandra	Cavan
Gorteenagarry (or Gorteen)	153	Tullyhunco	Kildallan	Cavan
Gorteenaterriff (or Gorteen)	345	Tullyhunco	Killashandra	Cavan
Gorteennaglogh	115	Tullyhaw	Kinawley	Bawnboy
Gortin	206	Tullygarvey	Kildrumsherdan	Cootehill
Gortlaunaght	107	Tullyhaw	Kinawley	Bawnboy
Gortmore	112	Tullyhaw	Templeport	Bawnboy
Gortnacargy	155	Tullyhaw	Templeport	Bawnboy
Gortnacleigh	98	Tullyhunco	Kildallan	Cavan
Gortnaderrylea	43	Tullyhaw	Kinawley	Bawnboy
Gortnakesh	25	Upper Loughtee	Annagelliff	Cavan
Gortnakillew	212	Upper Loughtee	Lavey	Cavan
Gortnaleck	94	Tullyhaw	Templeport	Bawnboy
Gortnaleg	172	Tullyhaw	Kinawley	Bawnboy
Gortnaleg	262	Tullyhaw	Killinagh	Enniskillen
Gortnashangan Lower (or Bingfield)	123	Clanmahon	Kilmore	Cavan
Gortnashangan Upper (or Hermitage)	163	Clanmahon	Kilmore	Cavan
Gortnavreeghan	383	Tullyhaw	Templeport	Bawnboy
Gortoorlan	208	Tullyhaw	Tomregan	Bawnboy
Gortskeagh	246	Tullygarvey	Drung	Cootehill
Gortullaghan	171	Tullyhaw	Templeport	Bawnboy
Gowlagh North	140	Tullyhaw	Templeport	Bawnboy
Gowlagh South	165	Tullyhaw	Templeport	Bawnboy
Gowlan	937	Tullyhaw	Templeport	Bawnboy
Gowlan	260	Tullyhaw	Killinagh	Enniskillen
Gowlat	301	Tullyhaw	Templeport	Enniskillen
Graddum	363	Castlerahan	Crosserlough	Cavan
Greagh	141	Tullyhaw	Templeport	Bawnboy
Greagh	275	Clankee	Knockbride	Cootehill
Greaghacholea (or Coraghmuck)	281	Tullyhunco	Kildallan	Bawnboy
Greaghadoo	183	Castlerahan	Killinkere	Bailieborough
Greaghadossan	556	Castlerahan	Killinkere	Bailieborough
Greaghagarran	157	Clankee	Knockbride	Cootehill
Greaghagibney	524	Tullygarvey	Larah	Cootehill
Greagharne	138	Clankee	Bailieborough	Bailieborough
Greaghclaugh	221	Castlerahan	Killinkere	Bailieborough
Greaghclogh	513	Castlerahan	Mullagh	Bailieborough
Greaghcrottagh	193	Clankee	Knockbride	Bailieborough
Greaghcrottagh	225	Tullygarvey	Drung	Cootehill
Greaghduff	40	Castlerahan	Bailieborough	Bailieborough
Greaghduff	140	Castlerahan	Killinkere	Bailieborough
Greaghettiagh	425	Clankee	Knockbride	Cootehill
Greaghnacross	394	Tullygarvey	Kildrumsherdan	Cootehill
Greaghnacunnia	203	Castlerahan	Killinkere	Bailieborough
Greaghnadarragh	268	Clankee	Moybolgue	Bailieborough
Greaghnadarragh	174	Castlerahan	Mullagh	Kells
Greaghnadoony	88	Tullyhaw	Templeport	Bawnboy
Greaghnafarna	530	Upper Loughtee	Killinkere	Cavan
Greaghnagee	114	Upper Loughtee	Lavey	Cavan
Greaghnmale	213	Clankee	Bailieborough	Bailieborough
Greaghrahan	284	Lower Loughtee	Drumlane	Cavan
Greathill	111	Lower Loughtee	Drumlane	Cavan
Grellagh	344	Upper Loughtee	Lavey	Cavan
Grilly	171	Lower Loughtee	Annagh	Cavan
Grousehall	288	Clanmahon	Drumlumman	Granard
Gub (Kinawley)	158	Tullyhaw	Kinawley	Bawnboy
Gub (or Garvalt Upper)	201	Tullyhaw	Templeport	Enniskillen
Gubaveeny	1,372	Tullyhaw	Killinagh	Enniskillen
Gubnafarna	250	Tullyhaw	Kinawley	Bawnboy
Gubnagree	125	Tullyhaw	Templeport	Bawnboy
Gubrawully	303	Tullyhaw	Kinawley	Bawnboy
Gubrimmaddera	65	Tullyhaw	Kinawley	Bawnboy
Hackelty	35	Lower Loughtee	Annagh	Cavan
Hawkswood	180	Tullyhaw	Kinawley	Bawnboy
Heney	91	Upper Loughtee	Castleterra	Cavan
Hermitage (or Gortnashangan Upper)	163	Clanmahon	Kilmore	Cavan
Inch Island	87	Upper Loughtee	Kilmore	Cavan
Inishbeg	192	Upper Loughtee	Castleterra	Cavan
Inishconnell	154	Upper Loughtee	Kilmore	Cavan
Inishmore	491	Upper Loughtee	Urney	Cavan
Inishmuck	128	Upper Loughtee	Urney	Cavan
Invyarroge	216	Castlerahan	Killinkere	Bailieborough
Island	369	Castlerahan	Munterconnaught	Oldcastle
Keadew	177	Upper Loughtee	Castleterra	Cavan
Keadew	233	Upper Loughtee	Urney	Cavan
Keeghan	117	Tullygarvey	Kildrumsherdan	Cootehill
Keelagh	335	Tullyhunco	Killashandra	Cavan
Keelagh	247	Tullygarvey	Annagh	Cootehill
Keelagh Glebe	19	Castlerahan	Lurgan	Oldcastle
Keelderry	274	Clanmahon	Crosserlough	Cavan
Keenagh, Templeport	61	Tullyhaw	Templeport	Bawnboy
Keenagh	247	Castlerahan	Crosserlough	Oldcastle
Keenaghan	127	Lower Loughtee	Drumlane	Cavan
Keeny	220	Lower Loughtee	Annagh	Cavan
Keilagh	171	Tullyhunco	Kildallan	Bawnboy
Kevit Lower	134	Clanmahon	Kilmore	Cavan
Kevit Upper (or Castlecosby)	136	Clanmahon	Kilmore	Cavan
Kiffagh	400	Castlerahan	Crosserlough	Cavan
Kilbride	496	Clanmahon	Kilbride	Oldcastle
Kilclogha	185	Clankee	Drumgoon	Cootehill
Kilcogy	831	Clanmahon	Drumlumman	Granard
**Kilconny**	Town	Lower Loughtee	Drumlane	Cavan
Kilconny	375	Lower Loughtee	Drumlane	Cavan
Kilcorby	212	Lower Loughtee	Drumlane	Cavan
Kilcrossbeg	171	Clankee	Shercock	Bailieborough
Kilcrossduff	442	Clankee	Shercock	Bailieborough
Kildallan townland	397	Tullyhunco	Kildallan	Bawnboy
Kildoagh	179	Tullyhaw	Templeport	Bawnboy
Kildorragh Glebe	607	Castlerahan	Castlerahan	Oldcastle
Kilduff	177	Lower Loughtee	Annagh	Cavan
Kilduff	174	Tullygarvey	Annagh	Cavan
Kilduff Lower	127	Tullyhaw	Killinagh	Enniskillen
Kilduff Middle	140	Tullyhaw	Killinagh	Enniskillen
Kilduff Upper	96	Tullyhaw	Killinagh	Enniskillen
Kilgarve	103	Tullyhunco	Killashandra	Cavan
Kilgolagh	399	Clanmahon	Drumlumman	Granard
Kill	486	Clanmahon	Crosserlough	Cavan
Kill Demesne	158	Clanmahon	Crosserlough	Cavan
Killaghaduff	99	Tullyhaw	Kinawley	Bawnboy
Killaliss	218	Clankee	Knockbride	Cootehill
Killan	226	Clankee	Bailieborough	Bailieborough
Killaquill	53	Tullygarvey	Drumgoon	Cootehill
Killarah	683	Tullyhunco	Kildallan	Bawnboy
**Killashandra**	Town	Tullyhunco	Killashandra	Cavan
Killatee	319	Clankee	Drumgoon	Cootehill
Killeter	571	Castlerahan	Mullagh	Kells
Killicar	192	Lower Loughtee	Drumlane	Cavan
Killnagun	114	Castlerahan	Lurgan	Oldcastle
Killoughter	140	Tullygarvey	Annagh	Cootehill
Killybandrick	533	Tullygarvey	Annagh	Cavan
Killycannan	166	Clanmahon	Denn	Cavan
Killycarney	221	Tullyhaw	Killinagh	Enniskillen
Killycatron	156	Clanmahon	Drumlumman	Granard
Killycleare	162	Clankee	Drumgoon	Cootehill
Killycloghan	346	Clankee	Knockbride	Cootehill
Killycluggin	76	Tullyhaw	Templeport	Bawnboy
Killyconnan	216	Upper Loughtee	Lavey	Cavan
Killyconny	305	Castlerahan	Loughan or Castlekeeran	Oldcastle
Killycramph	65	Tullygarvey	Drumgoon	Cootehill
Killycreeny	204	Tullygarvey	Kildrumsherdan	Cootehill
Killycrin	166	Tullyhaw	Templeport	Bawnboy
Killycrone	151	Tullygarvey	Larah	Cavan
Killydoon	163	Clanmahon	Drumlumman	Granard
Killydream	271	Clanmahon	Drumlumman	Granard
Killyduff	201	Castlerahan	Killinkere	Bailieborough
Killyfana	324	Tullygarvey	Annagh	Cavan
Killyfassy	255	Clanmahon	Ballymachugh	Cavan
Killyfern	119	Lower Loughtee	Drumlane	Cavan
Killyfinla	232	Castlerahan	Castlerahan	Oldcastle
Killygarry	264	Upper Loughtee	Annagelliff	Cavan
Killygarry	62	Upper Loughtee	Castleterra	Cavan
Killygorman	299	Tullyhunco	Kildallan	Bawnboy
Killygowan	112	Tullyhunco	Kildallan	Cavan
Killygowan	266	Upper Loughtee	Kilmore	Cavan
Killygreagh	166	Tullyhunco	Kildallan	Bawnboy
Killygrogan	341	Upper Loughtee	Lavey	Cavan
Killykeen	59	Clanmahon	Ballymachugh	Cavan
Killykeen	178	Upper Loughtee	Kilmore	Cavan
Killykeen	54	Clanmahon	Drumlumman	Granard
Killylea	250	Lower Loughtee	Annagh	Cavan
Killymeehan	195	Upper Loughtee	Larah	Cavan
Killymoriarty	160	Tullyhaw	Templeport	Bawnboy
Killymullin	259	Tullygarvey	Drung	Cootehill
Killynaff	133	Tullyhaw	Templeport	Bawnboy
Killynaher	73	Lower Loughtee	Drumlane	Cavan
Killynanum	193	Upper Loughtee	Denn	Cavan
Killyneary	151	Tullyhaw	Templeport	Bawnboy
Killynebber	217	Upper Loughtee	Annagelliff	Cavan
Killynure	187	Tullygarvey	Annagh	Cavan
Killynure	369	Castlerahan	Crosserlough	Cavan
Killyran	329	Tullyhaw	Templeport	Bawnboy
Killyrue	230	Clankee	Drumgoon	Cootehill
Killyrue	133	Tullygarvey	Drung	Cootehill
Killytawny	137	Tullyhunco	Killashandra	Cavan
Killyteane	218	Upper Loughtee	Denn	Cavan
Killytogher	337	Castlerahan	Crosserlough	Cavan
Killyvaghan	338	Tullygarvey	Drumgoon	Cootehill
Killyvahan	111	Tullygarvey	Kildrumsherdan	Cootehill
Killyvally	107	Upper Loughtee	Kilmore	Cavan
Killyvally	157	Castlerahan	Denn	Oldcastle
Killyvanny	221	Upper Loughtee	Castleterra	Cavan
Killywaum	101	Tullyhaw	Templeport	Bawnboy
Killywillin	201	Tullyhaw	Templeport	Bawnboy
Killywilly	383	Lower Loughtee	Drumlane	Cavan
Kilmacaran	557	Clankee	Knockbride	Cootehill
Kilmacnoran	273	Tullygarvey	Drung	Cootehill
Kilmainham	297	Clanmahon	Crosserlough	Cavan
Kilmore	333	Castlerahan	Killinkere	Bailieborough
Kilmore	285	Castlerahan	Castlerahan	Oldcastle
Kilmore Lower	143	Upper Loughtee	Kilmore	Cavan
Kilmore Upper	226	Upper Loughtee	Kilmore	Cavan
Kilnacor	273	Upper Loughtee	Denn	Cavan
Kilnacranagh	136	Lower Loughtee	Drumlane	Cavan
Kilnacreeve	156	Upper Loughtee	Castleterra	Cavan
Kilnacreevy	265	Clanmahon	Denn	Cavan
Kilnacreevy	277	Upper Loughtee	Larah	Cavan
Kilnacrew	382	Clankee	Knockbride	Cootehill
Kilnacross	145	Clankee	Knockbride	Bailieborough
Kilnacross	112	Tullyhunco	Kildallan	Bawnboy
Kilnacross	166	Tullygarvey	Annagh	Cootehill
Kilnacross	168	Tullygarvey	Drung	Cootehill
Kilnacrott	465	Castlerahan	Crosserlough	Cavan
Kilnagarbet	128	Tullygarvey	Larah	Cootehill
Kilnaglare	237	Lower Loughtee	Drumlane	Cavan
Kilnaglare Lower	158	Upper Loughtee	Castleterra	Cavan
Kilnaglare Upper	57	Upper Loughtee	Castleterra	Cavan
Kilnahard	138	Clanmahon	Ballymachugh	Cavan
**Kilnaleck**	Town	Castlerahan	Crosserlough	Cavan
Kilnaleck	181	Lower Loughtee	Annagh	Cavan
Kilnaleck	297	Castlerahan	Crosserlough	Cavan
Kilnavar	184	Upper Loughtee	Lavey	Cavan
Kilnavara	309	Upper Loughtee	Urney	Cavan
Kilnavert	188	Tullyhaw	Templeport	Bawnboy
Kilquilly	243	Castlerahan	Castlerahan	Oldcastle
Kilsallagh	169	Tullyhaw	Templeport	Bawnboy
Kilsallagh	75	Clanmahon	Kilmore	Cavan
Kilsaran	436	Clanmahon	Drumlumman	Granard
Kilsob	348	Tullyhaw	Templeport	Bawnboy
Kiltaglassan	173	Tullyhaw	Killinagh	Enniskillen
Kiltomulty	167	Tullyhaw	Killinagh	Enniskillen
Kiltrasna	119	Tullyhunco	Killashandra	Cavan
Kiltynaskellan	547	Tullyhunco	Kildallan	Bawnboy
Kinagha Beg	61	Tullygarvey	Annagh	Cavan
Kinagha More	98	Tullygarvey	Annagh	Cavan
**Kingscourt**	Town	Clankee	Enniskeen	Bailieborough
Kinkeel	143	Tullyhunco	Killashandra	Cavan
Kinnabo	156	Tullyhaw	Killinagh	Enniskillen
Kinnea	236	Clankee	Knockbride	Bailieborough
Kinnypottle	78	Upper Loughtee	Urney	Cavan
Kivvy	155	Tullygarvey	Annagh	Cavan
Knappagh	243	Clankee	Drumgoon	Cootehill
Knockaghy	368	Tullyhunco	Scrabby	Cavan
Knockakishta	123	Upper Loughtee	Kilmore	Cavan
Knockanoark	288	Upper Loughtee	Lavey	Cavan
Knockanore	141	Clanmahon	Ballintemple	Cavan
Knockaraheen	316	Castlerahan	Munterconnaught	Oldcastle
Knockataggart	858	Tullygarvey	Larah	Cootehill
Knockateane	125	Tullygarvey	Drumgoon	Cootehill
Knockatee	52	Upper Loughtee	Castleterra	Cavan
Knockateery	207	Tullygarvey	Annagh	Cavan
Knockatemple	497	Castlerahan	Munterconnaught	Oldcastle
Knockatudor	224	Tullygarvey	Larah	Cootehill
Knockbride	386	Clankee	Knockbride	Bailieborough
Knockfad	198	Upper Loughtee	Castleterra	Cavan
Knockfin	226	Tullyhaw	Drumreilly	Bawnboy
Knockgorm	351	Tullyhaw	Templeport	Enniskillen
Knockmore, County Cavan	273	Tullyhaw	Templeport	Bawnboy
Knocknagartan	251	Castlerahan	Munterconnaught	Oldcastle
Knocknagillagh	71	Upper Loughtee	Lavey	Cavan
Knocknalosset	484	Clankee	Knockbride	Cootehill
Knocknashammer	393	Clankee	Drumgoon	Cootehill
Knocknaveagh	422	Castlerahan	Munterconnaught	Oldcastle
Knockranny	131	Tullyhaw	Kinawley	Bawnboy
Knockroe (Kinawley)	228	Tullyhaw	Kinawley	Bawnboy
Knockroe	40	Tullygarvey	Annagh	Cavan
Labbinlee	175	Tullygarvey	Kildrumsherdan	Cootehill
Lackan	136	Tullyhunco	Killashandra	Cavan
Lackan Lower	339	Clanmahon	Ballintemple	Cavan
Lackan Upper	185	Clanmahon	Ballintemple	Cavan
Lackanclare	128	Castlerahan	Denn	Cavan
Lackanduff	165	Castlerahan	Denn	Oldcastle
Lackanmore	399	Castlerahan	Denn	Oldcastle
Lagan	174	Lower Loughtee	Drumlane	Cavan
Lahard	296	Tullyhunco	Killashandra	Cavan
Laheen	242	Tullyhunco	Killashandra	Cavan
Lakefield, Templeport	87	Tullyhaw	Templeport	Bawnboy
Lanliss	245	Tullyhaw	Killinagh	Enniskillen
Lannanerriagh	709	Tullyhaw	Templeport	Bawnboy
Lappanbane	297	Tullygarvey	Drung	Cootehill
Lappanduff	192	Tullygarvey	Drung	Cootehill
Laragh	224	Clankee	Enniskeen	Bailieborough
Larah	136	Upper Loughtee	Larah	Cavan
Laraweehan	145	Clankee	Drumgoon	Cootehill
Larchfield Glebe	49	Clankee	Enniskeen	Bailieborough
Largan	203	Upper Loughtee	Denn	Cavan
Largy (or Forthenry)	346	Tullygarvey	Kildrumsherdan	Cootehill
Lateaster	122	Castlerahan	Killinkere	Bailieborough
Lateever	231	Upper Loughtee	Lavey	Cavan
Latnadronagh	330	Castlerahan	Crosserlough	Cavan
Latsey	437	Clankee	Knockbride	Cootehill
Latt	231	Upper Loughtee	Annagelliff	Cavan
Lattacapple	134	Tullygarvey	Drung	Cootehill
Lattagloghan	604	Upper Loughtee	Lavey	Cavan
Latterriff	122	Clankee	Shercock	Bailieborough
Lattone	98	Tullyhaw	Templeport	Enniskillen
Lattoon	288	Castlerahan	Lurgan	Oldcastle
Lattyloo	126	Tullygarvey	Drumgoon	Cootehill
Latully	298	Clankee	Drumgoon	Cootehill
Lavagh	364	Clanmahon	Ballymachugh	Cavan
Lavey	458	Upper Loughtee	Lavey	Cavan
Leaghin	203	Tullygarvey	Kildrumsherdan	Cootehill
Leam	36	Clanmahon	Ballintemple	Cavan
Leamgeltan	118	Tullygarvey	Kildrumsherdan	Cootehill
Lear	477	Clankee	Bailieborough	Bailieborough
Lear	127	Clankee	Knockbride	Cootehill
Lecharrownahone	313	Tullyhaw	Templeport	Bawnboy
Lecharry	355	Castlerahan	Crosserlough	Cavan
Leck	86	Tullyhaw	Killinagh	Enniskillen
Lecks	505	Clankee	Shercock	Bailieborough
Ledonigan	197	Clankee	Knockbride	Bailieborough
Legaginny	185	Clanmahon	Ballintemple	Cavan
Legaland	225	Clanmahon	Kilmore	Cavan
Legalough	108	Tullyhaw	Killinagh	Enniskillen
Legatraghta	197	Tullyhaw	Templeport	Enniskillen
Legavreagra	467	Tullyhaw	Kinawley	Bawnboy
Legaweel	118	Clanmahon	Ballintemple	Cavan
Legeelan	233	Tullyhaw	Killinagh	Enniskillen
Leggandenn (or Dennmore)	445	Upper Loughtee	Denn	Cavan
Legglass	216	Tullyhaw	Templeport	Enniskillen
Leggykelly	248	Tullygarvey	Annagh	Cavan
Legland	461	Clankee	Knockbride	Cootehill
Legnaderk	359	Tullyhaw	Templeport	Enniskillen
Legnagrow	830	Tullyhaw	Templeport	Enniskillen
Legwee	281	Clanmahon	Drumlumman	Granard
Leiter	186	Clankee	Bailieborough	Bailieborough
Leiter	630	Clankee	Enniskeen	Bailieborough
Leiter	164	Upper Loughtee	Lavey	Cavan
Leitra, Corlough	82	Tullyhaw	Templeport	Bawnboy
Leitrim	229	Clankee	Moybolgue	Bailieborough
Leitrim	637	Castlerahan	Loughan or Castlekeeran	Kells
Lenanavragh	223	Castlerahan	Mullagh	Kells
Lettermore	229	Tullygarvey	Kildrumsherdan	Cootehill
Lisachunny	53	Clankee	Enniskeen	Bailieborough
Lisaderg	198	Upper Loughtee	Lavey	Cavan
Lisaderg (or Corweelis)	207	Tullygarvey	Drumgoon	Cootehill
Lisagoan	696	Clankee	Enniskeen	Bailieborough
Lisanalsk	247	Clankee	Bailieborough	Bailieborough
Lisanisky	112	Clankee	Enniskeen	Bailieborough
Lisanny	210	Clanmahon	Drumlumman	Granard
Lisarney	242	Tullygarvey	Drung	Cootehill
Lisasturrin	83	Clankee	Enniskeen	Bailieborough
Lisataggart	94	Clankee	Shercock	Bailieborough
Lisatawan	126	Upper Loughtee	Larah	Cavan
Lisatoo	150	Upper Loughtee	Larah	Cavan
Lisawaum	69	Tullygarvey	Drumgoon	Cootehill
Lisball	799	Clankee	Bailieborough	Bailieborough
Lisboduff	186	Tullygarvey	Drung	Cootehill
Lisbree	238	Tullygarvey	Drung	Cootehill
Lisclogher	230	Clankee	Drumgoon	Cootehill
Lisclone	179	Tullygarvey	Larah	Cootehill
Lisdaran	125	Upper Loughtee	Urney	Cavan
Lisdeegin	84	Upper Loughtee	Castleterra	Cavan
Lisdoagh	101	Clankee	Drumgoon	Cootehill
Lisdonan	220	Clankee	Knockbride	Bailieborough
Lisdonnish	134	Castlerahan	Crosserlough	Cavan
Lisdrumfad	160	Clankee	Shercock	Bailieborough
Lisdrumskea	248	Clankee	Shercock	Bailieborough
Lisduff	471	Clanmahon	Ballymachugh	Cavan
Lisduff	125	Upper Loughtee	Kilmore	Cavan
Lisduff	267	Castlerahan	Lurgan	Oldcastle
Lisdunvis Glebe	67	Upper Loughtee	Castleterra	Cavan
Lisegny	135	Tullygarvey	Larah	Cootehill
Lisgannon	294	Tullygarvey	Drung	Cootehill
Lisgar	299	Clankee	Bailieborough	Bailieborough
Lisgrea	391	Castlerahan	Lurgan	Oldcastle
Lishenry	150	Castlerahan	Denn	Oldcastle
Lisinigan	50	Tullygarvey	Drung	Cootehill
Lislea	211	Upper Loughtee	Denn	Cavan
Lislea	186	Tullygarvey	Kildrumsherdan	Cootehill
Lislea	221	Tullygarvey	Larah	Cootehill
Lislea	486	Castlerahan	Lurgan	Oldcastle
Lislin	101	Tullygarvey	Drung	Cootehill
Lislin	305	Castlerahan	Mullagh	Kells
Lismacanigan Lower	386	Castlerahan	Castlerahan	Oldcastle
Lismacanigan Upper	236	Castlerahan	Castlerahan	Oldcastle
Lismagiril	377	Castlerahan	Killinkere	Bailieborough
Lismagratty	182	Upper Loughtee	Castleterra	Cavan
Lismeen	60	Upper Loughtee	Denn	Cavan
Lismeen	331	Castlerahan	Lurgan	Oldcastle
Lismore Demesne	332	Clanmahon	Kilmore	Cavan
Lismullig	90	Upper Loughtee	Annagelliff	Cavan
Lisnabantry	233	Castlerahan	Killinkere	Bailieborough
Lisnabantry	135	Castlerahan	Mullagh	Bailieborough
Lisnabrinnia	140	Clanmahon	Kilbride	Oldcastle
Lisnacark	65	Upper Loughtee	Castleterra	Cavan
Lisnaclea	180	Clankee	Enniskeen	Bailieborough
Lisnaclea	324	Clankee	Drumgoon	Cootehill
Lisnadarragh	117	Clankee	Shercock	Bailieborough
Lisnadarragh	183	Clanmahon	Drumlumman	Granard
Lisnafana	243	Castlerahan	Lurgan	Oldcastle
Lisnageer	162	Tullygarvey	Drumgoon	Cootehill
Lisnageer	198	Tullygarvey	Kildrumsherdan	Cootehill
Lisnaglea	219	Upper Loughtee	Larah	Cavan
Lisnagoon	158	Tullygarvey	Drumgoon	Cootehill
Lisnagowan	151	Upper Loughtee	Castleterra	Cavan
Lisnahederna	119	Clankee	Enniskeen	Bailieborough
Lisnahederna	281	Castlerahan	Mullagh	Bailieborough
Lisnalea	143	Clankee	Bailieborough	Bailieborough
Lisnamaine (or Sycamore Fields)	55	Lower Loughtee	Drumlane	Cavan
Lisnamandra	89	Upper Loughtee	Kilmore	Cavan
Lisnananagh	209	Clanmahon	Ballintemple	Cavan
Lisnananagh	167	Upper Loughtee	Larah	Cavan
Lisnasaran	84	Tullygarvey	Drumgoon	Cootehill
Lisnasassonagh	105	Clankee	Enniskeen	Bailieborough
Lisnashanna	176	Upper Loughtee	Castleterra	Cavan
Lisnatinny	148	Clanmahon	Drumlumman	Granard
Lisreagh	155	Upper Loughtee	Annagelliff	Cavan
Lissacapple	186	Castlerahan	Killinkere	Bailieborough
Lissanover	299	Tullyhaw	Templeport	Bawnboy
Lissanymore	760	Upper Loughtee	Killinkere	Bailieborough
Listiernan	390	Tullyhunco	Kildallan	Bawnboy
Long	167	Tullygarvey	Kildrumsherdan	Cootehill
Longfield	93	Tullygarvey	Drung	Cootehill
Longfield	141	Tullygarvey	Larah	Cootehill
Lonnogs	300	Upper Loughtee	Denn	Cavan
Loortan	54	Tullygarvey	Kildrumsherdan	Cootehill
Losset	123	Tullyhunco	Killashandra	Cavan
Lossetkillew	86	Clanmahon	Ballymachugh	Cavan
Loughaconnick	161	Upper Loughtee	Kilmore	Cavan
Loughan	113	Tullyhaw	Killinagh	Enniskillen
Loughdawan	454	Clanmahon	Drumlumman	Granard
Loughdooly	125	Lower Loughtee	Drumlane	Cavan
Loughlinnan	78	Tullygarvey	Drung	Cootehill
Loughnafin (or Rockfield)	378	Tullyhunco	Killashandra	Cavan
Lowforge (or Drumconra)	189	Tullyhaw	Kinawley	Bawnboy
Lurgan	127	Castlerahan	Lurgan	Oldcastle
Lurgan Glebe	44	Castlerahan	Lurgan	Oldcastle
Lurgananure	326	Castlerahan	Killinkere	Bailieborough
Lurganaveele	221	Castlerahan	Killinkere	Bailieborough
Lurganbane	119	Clankee	Bailieborough	Bailieborough
Lurganboy	46	Upper Loughtee	Urney	Cavan
Lurganboy	176	Clankee	Drumgoon	Cootehill
Lurganboy	272	Castlerahan	Munterconnaught	Oldcastle
Mackan	176	Tullyhunco	Kildallan	Bawnboy
Macknan	77	Lower Loughtee	Drumlane	Cavan
Magheraboy Lower	236	Clanmahon	Drumlumman	Granard
Magheraboy Upper	263	Clanmahon	Drumlumman	Granard
Magheranure	204	Tullygarvey	Drumgoon	Cootehill
Magherintemple	93	Tullygarvey	Drung	Cootehill
Maghernacaldry	65	Tullygarvey	Drumgoon	Cootehill
Makief	99	Tullyhunco	Kildallan	Bawnboy
Manragh Lower	80	Tullyhaw	Killinagh	Enniskillen
Manragh Upper	115	Tullyhaw	Killinagh	Enniskillen
Marahill	91	Clankee	Enniskeen	Bailieborough
Marahill	88	Clanmahon	Ballintemple	Cavan
Marahill	362	Upper Loughtee	Kilmore	Cavan
Mayo	174	Tullygarvey	Drumgoon	Cootehill
Meeltoge	45	Lower Loughtee	Drumlane	Cavan
Meenaslieve	211	Tullyhaw	Killinagh	Enniskillen
Middletown	225	Clanmahon	Drumlumman	Granard
Milltown	129	Lower Loughtee	Drumlane	Cavan
Moat	161	Clanmahon	Ballymachugh	Cavan
Moher	939	Tullyhaw	Tomregan	Bawnboy
Moher (Drumreilly)	218	Tullyhaw	Drumreilly	Bawnboy
Moher	202	Upper Loughtee	Denn	Cavan
Moher	99	Lower Loughtee	Drumlane	Cavan
Moher	590	Upper Loughtee	Lavey	Cavan
Mohercrom	215	Clankee	Enniskeen	Bailieborough
Moherloob	111	Tullyhaw	Templeport	Bawnboy
Moherreagh	195	Tullyhaw	Templeport	Bawnboy
Monaghanoose	648	Clankee	Bailieborough	Bailieborough
Moneen	652	Tullyhaw	Killinagh	Enniskillen
Moneenabrone	138	Tullyhaw	Templeport	Enniskillen
Moneensauran	1,739	Tullyhaw	Templeport	Enniskillen
Moneenterriff	332	Tullyhaw	Killinagh	Enniskillen
Monelty	161	Tullygarvey	Larah	Cootehill
Monesk	1,077	Tullyhaw	Killinagh	Enniskillen
Money	103	Lower Loughtee	Drumlane	Cavan
Moneycass Glebe	314	Tullygarvey	Larah	Cootehill
Moneygashel	328	Tullyhaw	Killinagh	Enniskillen
Moneynure	90	Tullyhaw	Templeport	Bawnboy
Monnery Lower	258	Upper Loughtee	Kilmore	Cavan
Monnery Upper	212	Upper Loughtee	Kilmore	Cavan
Monydoo (or Tonycrom)	444	Tullyhaw	Kinawley	Bawnboy
Moodoge	99	Castlerahan	Castlerahan	Oldcastle
Mount Nugent	137	Clanmahon	Kilbride	Oldcastle
**Mount Nugent Town**	Town	Clanmahon	Kilbride	Oldcastle
Mountpallas	248	Clanmahon	Kilbride	Oldcastle
Mountprospect	353	Castlerahan	Castlerahan	Oldcastle
Moydristan	219	Clanmahon	Ballymachugh	Cavan
Moyduff	213	Clankee	Drumgoon	Cootehill
Moyer	350	Clankee	Enniskeen	Bailieborough
Moylett	561	Upper Loughtee	Killinkere	Cavan
Moynagh Lower	302	Clanmahon	Drumlumman	Granard
Moynagh Upper	366	Clanmahon	Drumlumman	Granard
Moynehall	195	Upper Loughtee	Annagelliff	Cavan
Mucklagh	324	Tullyhaw	Tomregan	Bawnboy
Muff	128	Clankee	Enniskeen	Bailieborough
Muff	279	Tullygarvey	Kildrumsherdan	Cootehill
Muinaghan	232	Tullyhaw	Templeport	Bawnboy
Muineal	105	Tullyhaw	Templeport	Bawnboy
Mullacastle	345	Castlerahan	Crosserlough	Cavan
Mullacroghery	231	Tullygarvey	Annagh	Cootehill
**Mullagh**	Town	Castlerahan	Mullagh	Kells
Mullagh	668	Castlerahan	Mullagh	Kells
Mullaghahy	103	Tullyhaw	Killinagh	Enniskillen
Mullaghard	288	Clankee	Drumgoon	Cootehill
Mullaghboy	225	Clanmahon	Ballintemple	Cavan
Mullaghboy	301	Clanmahon	Ballymachugh	Cavan
Mullaghboy	65	Lower Loughtee	Drumlane	Cavan
Mullaghboy	126	Tullyhunco	Killashandra	Cavan
Mullaghboy	234	Tullygarvey	Kildrumsherdan	Cootehill
Mullaghboy	303	Tullyhaw	Killinagh	Enniskillen
Mullaghdoo, Cavan	272	Tullyhunco	Kildallan	Bawnboy
Mullaghduff	252	Tullyhaw	Tomregan	Bawnboy
Mullaghkeel	48	Clanmahon	Crosserlough	Cavan
Mullaghlea	528	Tullyhaw	Templeport	Bawnboy
Mullaghlea Glen	238	Tullyhaw	Templeport	Enniskillen
Mullaghmeen	114	Lower Loughtee	Drumlane	Cavan
Mullaghmore, Tullyhunco	459	Tullyhunco	Kildallan	Bawnboy
Mullaghmore, Templeport	205	Tullyhaw	Templeport	Bawnboy
Mullaghmore	248	Castlerahan	Castlerahan	Oldcastle
Mullaghmore	62	Castlerahan	Lurgan	Oldcastle
Mullaghmullan	106	Tullyhunco	Kildallan	Cavan
Mullaghoran	722	Clanmahon	Drumlumman	Granard
Mullalougher	296	Tullygarvey	Annagh	Cootehill
Mullan	109	Clankee	Drumgoon	Cootehill
Mullanacre Lower	314	Tullyhaw	Tomregan	Bawnboy
Mullanacre Upper	552	Tullyhaw	Tomregan	Bawnboy
Mullanacross	198	Clankee	Enniskeen	Bailieborough
Mullanaffrin	127	Lower Loughtee	Drumlane	Cavan
Mullanavarnoge	94	Tullygarvey	Annagh	Cavan
Mullandreenagh (or Thornhill)	168	Tullyhaw	Killinagh	Enniskillen
Mullantra	61	Clankee	Enniskeen	Bailieborough
Mullanwary	62	Lower Loughtee	Drumlane	Cavan
Mully Lower	123	Tullyhaw	Templeport	Enniskillen
Mully Upper	151	Tullyhaw	Templeport	Enniskillen
Mullyamly	135	Clanmahon	Ballintemple	Cavan
Mullybrack	280	Clankee	Knockbride	Cootehill
Mullymagowan	544	Upper Loughtee	Lavey	Cavan
Mullynagolman	109	Lower Loughtee	Tomregan	Bawnboy
Mulnanarragh	136	Tullygarvey	Annagh	Cavan
Mulrick	341	Tullyhunco	Scrabby	Granard
Munlough North	105	Tullyhaw	Templeport	Bawnboy
Munlough South	68	Tullyhaw	Templeport	Bawnboy
Munnilly	98	Tullygarvey	Drumgoon	Cootehill
Murmod	746	Castlerahan	Lurgan	Oldcastle
Naheelis	88	Lower Loughtee	Drumlane	Cavan
Ned, Tullyhunco	323	Tullyhunco	Killashandra	Bawnboy
Neddaiagh	204	Tullygarvey	Annagh	Cootehill
Newtown (Kinawley)	56	Tullyhaw	Kinawley	Bawnboy
Newtown, Templeport	93	Tullyhaw	Templeport	Bawnboy
Newtown	120	Upper Loughtee	Denn	Cavan
Newtown	107	Clanmahon	Kilmore	Cavan
Noghan	189	Lower Loughtee	Drumlane	Cavan
Nolagh	751	Clankee	Shercock	Bailieborough
Nutfield	109	Tullygarvey	Drung	Cootehill
Oakwood (or Drummully)	182	Upper Loughtee	Castleterra	Cavan
Oggal	265	Tullyhaw	Killinagh	Enniskillen
Oghill	335	Clanmahon	Ballintemple	Cavan
Oldtown (or Cornagleragh)	126	Upper Loughtee	Annagelliff	Cavan
Omard	965	Clanmahon	Ballymachugh	Cavan
Ouley	82	Upper Loughtee	Castleterra	Cavan
Owencam	314	Tullyhaw	Templeport	Bawnboy
Owengallees	469	Tullyhaw	Templeport	Bawnboy
Paddock	321	Upper Loughtee	Urney	Cavan
Palmira (or Cornaglare)	389	Castlerahan	Mullagh	Kells
Parisee	467	Lower Loughtee	Annagh	Cavan
Plush	230	Upper Loughtee	Castleterra	Cavan
Poles	292	Upper Loughtee	Annagelliff	Cavan
Pollabane	352	Upper Loughtee	Kilmore	Cavan
Pollafree	243	Upper Loughtee	Denn	Cavan
Pollakeel	500	Upper Loughtee	Denn	Cavan
Pollakeel	193	Clanmahon	Kilbride	Oldcastle
Pollamalady	264	Castlerahan	Lurgan	Oldcastle
Pollamore Far	256	Upper Loughtee	Annagelliff	Cavan
Pollamore Near	247	Upper Loughtee	Annagelliff	Cavan
Pollareagh	244	Castlerahan	Crosserlough	Cavan
Pollareagh	137	Clanmahon	Kilbride	Oldcastle
Pollintemple	98	Castlerahan	Lurgan	Oldcastle
Port, Templeport	335	Tullyhaw	Templeport	Bawnboy
Port	168	Tullyhaw	Killinagh	Enniskillen
Port (or Glasstown)	118	Tullyhunco	Kildallan	Cavan
Port Island	1	Tullyhaw	Killinagh	Enniskillen
Portacloghan	132	Lower Loughtee	Drumlane	Cavan
Portaliff (or Townparks)	326	Tullyhunco	Killashandra	Cavan
Portaliff Glebe	10	Tullyhunco	Killashandra	Cavan
Portan	128	Castlerahan	Crosserlough	Cavan
Portanure	371	Tullyhunco	Scrabby	Granard
Portlawney	139	Lower Loughtee	Drumlane	Cavan
Portlongfield	762	Tullyhunco	Killashandra	Cavan
Portnaquin	53	Tullyhunco	Killashandra	Cavan
Portruan	111	Lower Loughtee	Annagh	Cavan
Porturlan	67	Tullyhaw	Templeport	Bawnboy
Pottahee	145	Clanmahon	Ballintemple	Cavan
Pottle	87	Upper Loughtee	Annagelliff	Cavan
Pottle	136	Tullyhunco	Killashandra	Cavan
Pottle	56	Upper Loughtee	Kilmore	Cavan
Pottle	81	Clankee	Knockbride	Cootehill
Pottle	130	Castlerahan	Denn	Oldcastle
Pottle East	89	Tullygarvey	Drung	Cootehill
Pottle Lower	244	Clankee	Bailieborough	Bailieborough
Pottle Soden	43	Upper Loughtee	Denn	Cavan
Pottle Upper	252	Clankee	Bailieborough	Bailieborough
Pottle West	150	Tullygarvey	Drung	Cootehill
Pottlebane	271	Clanmahon	Drumlumman	Granard
Pottleboy	91	Clanmahon	Ballymachugh	Cavan
Pottleboy	40	Upper Loughtee	Castleterra	Cavan
Pottleboy	74	Tullygarvey	Kildrumsherdan	Cootehill
Pottlebrack	185	Clankee	Knockbride	Bailieborough
Pottleduff	51	Castlerahan	Killinkere	Bailieborough
Pottlereagh	98	Tullygarvey	Drumgoon	Cootehill
Prospect, Corlough	229	Tullyhaw	Templeport	Bawnboy
Putiaghan Lower	88	Lower Loughtee	Urney	Cavan
Putiaghan Upper	121	Lower Loughtee	Urney	Cavan
Quivvy	484	Lower Loughtee	Drumlane	Cavan
Quivvy	65	Tullyhunco	Killashandra	Cavan
Rabane	81	Clankee	Knockbride	Bailieborough
Rabane	175	Clankee	Shercock	Bailieborough
Rabrackan	36	Clanmahon	Ballintemple	Cavan
Raclaghy	165	Clanmahon	Kilbride	Oldcastle
Racraveen	105	Clanmahon	Kilbride	Oldcastle
Raffony	279	Castlerahan	Mullagh	Bailieborough
Rafian	159	Lower Loughtee	Drumlane	Cavan
Ragaskin	156	Upper Loughtee	Castleterra	Cavan
Rahaghan	53	Lower Loughtee	Drumlane	Cavan
Rahardrum	324	Castlerahan	Lurgan	Oldcastle
Raharverty	76	Clanmahon	Crosserlough	Cavan
Raheelagh	305	Upper Loughtee	Larah	Cavan
Raheelan	133	Lower Loughtee	Drumlane	Cavan
Raheever	348	Clanmahon	Kilbride	Oldcastle
Raheg	224	Upper Loughtee	Castleterra	Cavan
Rahellistin	125	Tullygarvey	Annagh	Cavan
Rahoran	52	Tullygarvey	Drung	Cootehill
Rahultan	153	Upper Loughtee	Urney	Cavan
Rakane	310	Tullygarvey	Kildrumsherdan	Cootehill
Rakeelan	125	Tullyhaw	Tomregan	Bawnboy
Rakeevan	727	Clankee	Bailieborough	Bailieborough
Rakenny	339	Tullygarvey	Drung	Cootehill
Ralaghan	632	Clankee	Shercock	Bailieborough
Ralaghan	243	Clankee	Drumgoon	Cootehill
Raleagh	285	Tullyhunco	Kildallan	Bawnboy
Raludan	68	Tullygarvey	Kildrumsherdan	Cootehill
Ramonan	194	Castlerahan	Castlerahan	Oldcastle
Ramulligan	129	Tullygarvey	Annagh	Cavan
Ranrenagh	189	Upper Loughtee	Denn	Cavan
Rantavan	672	Castlerahan	Mullagh	Kells
Raragh	114	Clankee	Enniskeen	Bailieborough
Raskill	216	Upper Loughtee	Larah	Cavan
Rassan	392	Castlerahan	Crosserlough	Cavan
Rassan (or Corglass)	96	Castlerahan	Crosserlough	Oldcastle
Rasuddan	227	Castlerahan	Castlerahan	Oldcastle
Rathcorick	207	Upper Loughtee	Annagelliff	Cavan
Ratrussan	605	Tullygarvey	Kildrumsherdan	Cootehill
Ravenfield (or Aghadoon)	69	Upper Loughtee	Denn	Cavan
Ray	143	Tullyhaw	Templeport	Bawnboy
Reask	104	Upper Loughtee	Annagelliff	Cavan
**Redhill**	Town	Tullygarvey	Annagh	Cavan
Redhill Demesne	185	Tullygarvey	Annagh	Cavan
Relagh Beg	173	Clankee	Moybolgue	Bailieborough
Relagh More	114	Clankee	Moybolgue	Bailieborough
Ricehill (or Coolnagor)	128	Upper Loughtee	Kilmore	Cavan
Rinn	183	Lower Loughtee	Drumlane	Cavan
Rivory	312	Upper Loughtee	Urney	Cavan
Rockfield	159	Castlerahan	Crosserlough	Cavan
Rockfield (or Loughnafin)	378	Tullyhunco	Killashandra	Cavan
Rocks	81	Clanmahon	Kilmore	Cavan
Roebuck	440	Clanmahon	Kilbride	Oldcastle
Rogary	35	Lower Loughtee	Drumlane	Cavan
Ronard	76	Tullygarvey	Drung	Cootehill
Roo	419	Tullyhaw	Killinagh	Enniskillen
Roosky	202	Clankee	Knockbride	Cootehill
Rosehill, Templeport	56	Tullyhaw	Templeport	Bawnboy
Rosehill	795	Castlerahan	Mullagh	Kells
Rossbressal (or Bellaheady)	222	Tullyhunco	Kildallan	Bawnboy
Rosscolgan	111	Upper Loughtee	Urney	Cavan
Rosskeeragh	183	Lower Loughtee	Annagh	Cavan
Ryefield	923	Castlerahan	Munterconnaught	Oldcastle
Ryefort (or Aghateggal)	109	Upper Loughtee	Denn	Cavan
Sallaghan	177	Tullyhunco	Killashandra	Cavan
Sallaghan	356	Tullyhunco	Scrabby	Granard
Sallaghill	181	Castlerahan	Crosserlough	Cavan
Sally Island	4	Upper Loughtee	Kilmore	Cavan
Scotch Island	1	Upper Loughtee	Kilmore	Cavan
Scotchtown (or Gortawee)	137	Tullyhaw	Tomregan	Bawnboy
**Scrabby**	Town	Tullyhunco	Scrabby	Granard
Scrabby, Corlough	191	Tullyhaw	Templeport	Bawnboy
Scrabby	306	Tullyhunco	Scrabby	Granard
See	108	Tullygarvey	Drung	Cootehill
Seefin	593	Clankee	Knockbride	Bailieborough
Seeharan	371	Castlerahan	Mullagh	Bailieborough
Seeogran	459	Clankee	Knockbride	Cootehill
Shancor	165	Tullyhunco	Killashandra	Cavan
Shancor	127	Clanmahon	Kilmore	Cavan
Shancorn	97	Lower Loughtee	Annagh	Cavan
Shancorry	69	Lower Loughtee	Annagh	Cavan
Shancroagham	145	Tullyhunco	Killashandra	Cavan
Shankill	100	Clanmahon	Ballymachugh	Cavan
Shankill Lower	236	Upper Loughtee	Annagelliff	Cavan
Shankill Upper	276	Upper Loughtee	Annagelliff	Cavan
Shannow	178	Clanmahon	Denn	Cavan
Shannow Lower	283	Clanmahon	Ballintemple	Cavan
Shannow Upper	167	Clanmahon	Ballintemple	Cavan
Shannow Wood	218	Tullygarvey	Annagh	Cavan
Shantemon	396	Upper Loughtee	Castleterra	Cavan
Shantully	56	Clanmahon	Kilmore	Cavan
**Shercock**	Town	Clankee	Shercock	Bailieborough
Shibbilis	116	Tullygarvey	Drumgoon	Cootehill
Shinan	255	Clankee	Shercock	Bailieborough
Skeagh	691	Clankee	Knockbride	Bailieborough
Skeagh	170	Tullyhaw	Killinagh	Enniskillen
Skerrig	169	Tullygarvey	Drumgoon	Cootehill
Slanore	129	Upper Loughtee	Kilmore	Cavan
Slievebrickan	132	Lower Loughtee	Tomregan	Bawnboy
Snakeel	255	Upper Loughtee	Kilmore	Cavan
Snugborough	496	Tullyhaw	Tomregan	Bawnboy
Srahan	204	Clankee	Moybolgue	Bailieborough
Sralahan (Kinawley)	133	Tullyhaw	Kinawley	Bawnboy
Sralahan (or The Common)	207	Tullyhaw	Tomregan	Bawnboy
Sranayalloge	31	Clanmahon	Kilbride	Oldcastle
Sruhagh	324	Tullyhaw	Templeport	Bawnboy
Sruhanagh	405	Tullyhaw	Killinagh	Enniskillen
Stonepark	68	Tullygarvey	Annagh	Cavan
**Stradone**	Town	Upper Loughtee	Larah	Cavan
Stragelliff	236	Upper Loughtee	Annagelliff	Cavan
Straheglin	263	Lower Loughtee	Annagh	Cavan
Stramaquerty	180	Castlerahan	Killinkere	Oldcastle
Stramatt	127	Castlerahan	Lurgan	Oldcastle
Stranadarragh	155	Tullyhaw	Templeport	Bawnboy
Stranagap	44	Tullyhaw	Killinagh	Enniskillen
Stranamart	636	Tullyhaw	Killinagh	Enniskillen
Stravicnabo	537	Upper Loughtee	Lavey	Cavan
Stroane	158	Lower Loughtee	Annagh	Cavan
**Swanlinbar**	Town	Tullyhaw	Kinawley	Bawnboy
Swellan Lower	248	Upper Loughtee	Urney	Cavan
Swellan Upper	107	Upper Loughtee	Urney	Cavan
Sycamore Fields (or Lisnamaine)	55	Lower Loughtee	Drumlane	Cavan
Taghart North (or Closnabraddan)	431	Clankee	Enniskeen	Bailieborough
Taghart South	872	Clankee	Enniskeen	Bailieborough
Tanderagee	251	Clankee	Bailieborough	Bailieborough
Tattyreagh	241	Clankee	Knockbride	Bailieborough
Tawlagh (or Cornaclea)	63	Tullyhunco	Kildallan	Cavan
Tawlaght	300	Clanmahon	Ballymachugh	Cavan
Tawlaght	89	Lower Loughtee	Drumlane	Cavan
Tawnagh	146	Tullyhaw	Templeport	Bawnboy
Tawnymakelly	138	Tullyhaw	Killinagh	Enniskillen
Tedeehan Lower	45	Clanmahon	Crosserlough	Cavan
Tedeehan Middle	70	Clanmahon	Crosserlough	Cavan
Tedeehan Upper	149	Clanmahon	Crosserlough	Cavan
Teebane	1,364	Tullyhaw	Killinagh	Enniskillen
Teeboy	472	Tullyhaw	Templeport	Bawnboy
Teemore	108	Lower Loughtee	Drumlane	Cavan
Teemore	71	Tullyhaw	Killinagh	Enniskillen
Tents	363	Tullyhaw	Killinagh	Enniskillen
Termon	755	Upper Loughtee	Killinkere	Bailieborough
Termon	238	Tullyhaw	Killinagh	Enniskillen
Thomascourt (or Drumroosk)	59	Upper Loughtee	Kilmore	Cavan
Thornhill (or Mullandreenagh)	168	Tullyhaw	Killinagh	Enniskillen
Three Carvaghs	224	Clankee	Knockbride	Cootehill
Ticosker	406	Tullyhunco	Killashandra	Cavan
Ticosker Glebe	43	Tullyhunco	Killashandra	Cavan
Tievenaman	446	Castlerahan	Killinkere	Bailieborough
Tievenareagh	60	Tullygarvey	Drumgoon	Cootehill
Tievenass	543	Tullygarvey	Kildrumsherdan	Cootehill
Tircahan	169	Tullyhaw	Kinawley	Bawnboy
Tircullen	125	Upper Loughtee	Kilmore	Cavan
Tirgormly	209	Lower Loughtee	Drumlane	Cavan
Tirlahode Lower	529	Upper Loughtee	Larah	Cavan
Tirlahode Upper	487	Upper Loughtee	Larah	Cavan
Tirliffin	232	Lower Loughtee	Drumlane	Cavan
Tirnawannagh	337	Tullyhaw	Templeport	Bawnboy
Tirourkan	111	Upper Loughtee	Annagelliff	Cavan
Tirquin	147	Upper Loughtee	Annagelliff	Cavan
Toberlyan	171	Tullyhaw	Templeport	Bawnboy
Toberlyan Duffin	160	Tullyhaw	Templeport	Bawnboy
Togher	299	Castlerahan	Killinkere	Bailieborough
Togher	454	Castlerahan	Crosserlough	Cavan
Togher (or Danesfort Demesne)	202	Upper Loughtee	Kilmore	Cavan
Toghernaross	276	Clanmahon	Drumlumman	Granard
Tomassan	133	Lower Loughtee	Drumlane	Cavan
Tomkinroad	146	Lower Loughtee	Drumlane	Cavan
Tonagh	163	Upper Loughtee	Castleterra	Cavan
Tonagh	374	Clanmahon	Kilbride	Oldcastle
Tonaghbane	274	Tullygarvey	Kildrumsherdan	Cootehill
Tonaloy	327	Tullyhunco	Kildallan	Bawnboy
Tonanilt	31	Tullyhaw	Kinawley	Enniskillen
Tonlegee	135	Tullyhaw	Templeport	Bawnboy
Tonyarraher	136	Lower Loughtee	Drumlane	Cavan
Tonyhallagh	37	Tullyhaw	Templeport	Bawnboy
Tonyconnelly	158	Tullygarvey	Larah	Cootehill
Tonycrom (or Monydoo)	444	Tullyhaw	Kinawley	Bawnboy
Tonyduff	414	Clankee	Knockbride	Cootehill
Tonyfoyle	440	Clankee	Knockbride	Bailieborough
Tonyhull	226	Clankee	Drumgoon	Cootehill
Tonyin	269	Tullygarvey	Kildrumsherdan	Cootehill
Tonylion	127	Castlerahan	Crosserlough	Cavan
Tonymacgilduff	159	Tullygarvey	Kildrumsherdan	Cootehill
Tonymore	405	Upper Loughtee	Kilmore	Cavan
Tonyquin	29	Tullyhaw	Kinawley	Bawnboy
Tonyrevan	55	Tullyhaw	Templeport	Bawnboy
Torrewa	22	Tullyhaw	Templeport	Bawnboy
Townparks	196	Upper Loughtee	Castleterra	Cavan
Townparks	38	Upper Loughtee	Urney	Cavan
Townparks of Portaliff	326	Tullyhunco	Killashandra	Cavan
Treehoo	163	Tullygarvey	Annagh	Cootehill
Trinity Island	122	Upper Loughtee	Kilmore	Cavan
Tuam	564	Tullyhaw	Killinagh	Enniskillen
Tuam Island	10	Tullyhaw	Killinagh	Enniskillen
Tullaghyrory	173	Tullyhaw	Killinagh	Enniskillen
Tullandreen	115	Tullyhaw	Templeport	Bawnboy
Tullanierin	143	Tullyhaw	Killinagh	Enniskillen
Tullantanty	174	Tullyhaw	Killinagh	Enniskillen
Tullanteen	130	Tullyhaw	Killinagh	Enniskillen
Tullantintin	128	Tullyhaw	Killinagh	Enniskillen
Tullavally	252	Tullygarvey	Drung	Cootehill
Tully	105	Lower Loughtee	Drumlane	Cavan
Tully	264	Tullyhunco	Killashandra	Cavan
Tully	90	Upper Loughtee	Kilmore	Cavan
Tullyagan	132	Clanmahon	Kilbride	Oldcastle
Tullyanog	455	Lower Loughtee	Drumlane	Cavan
Tullyard	136	Tullygarvey	Kildrumsherdan	Cootehill
Tullyart	90	Tullygarvey	Drung	Cootehill
Tullyboy	373	Clanmahon	Kilbride	Cavan
Tullybrack	192	Tullyhaw	Templeport	Bawnboy
Tullybrick	209	Clankee	Enniskeen	Bailieborough
Tullybrick	209	Clankee	Shercock	Bailieborough
Tullybrick	209	Tullygarvey	Drumgoon	Cootehill
Tullybrick	74	Tullygarvey	Drung	Cootehill
Tullybuck	90	Upper Loughtee	Castleterra	Cavan
Tullycrafton	277	Tullyhaw	Kinawley	Enniskillen
Tullydermot	180	Tullyhaw	Kinawley	Bawnboy
Tullygullin	416	Clanmahon	Drumlumman	Granard
Tullylorcan	434	Clankee	Knockbride	Cootehill
Tullylough	103	Upper Loughtee	Annagelliff	Cavan
Tullyloughfin	224	Tullyhaw	Templeport	Bawnboy
Tullyminister	57	Tullyhaw	Templeport	Enniskillen
Tullymongan Lower	26	Upper Loughtee	Urney	Cavan
Tullymongan Upper	74	Upper Loughtee	Urney	Cavan
Tullynabeherny	8	Tullyhunco	Kildallan	Bawnboy
Tullynacleigh	59	Tullyhaw	Templeport	Enniskillen
Tullynaconspod	135	Tullyhaw	Templeport	Bawnboy
Tullynacross	112	Tullygarvey	Drung	Cootehill
Tullynacross	183	Tullyhaw	Templeport	Enniskillen
Tullynafreave	297	Tullyhaw	Killinagh	Enniskillen
Tullynamoltra	100	Tullyhaw	Templeport	Bawnboy
Tullynamoyle	876	Tullyhaw	Killinagh	Enniskillen
Tullynaskeagh	387	Clankee	Moybolgue	Bailieborough
Tullyroane	135	Lower Loughtee	Annagh	Cavan
Tullytiernan	59	Tullyhaw	Templeport	Enniskillen
Tullytrasna	124	Tullyhaw	Templeport	Bawnboy
Tullytreane	226	Upper Loughtee	Denn	Cavan
Tullyunshin	92	Tullygarvey	Drumgoon	Cootehill
Tullyunshin	762	Tullygarvey	Larah	Cootehill
Tullyveela	503	Tullyhaw	Templeport	Bawnboy
**Tullyvin**	Town	Tullygarvey	Kildrumsherdan	Cootehill
Tullyvin	160	Tullygarvey	Kildrumsherdan	Cootehill
Tullywaltry	277	Clankee	Knockbride	Bailieborough
Tullywaum	179	Tullyhaw	Templeport	Bawnboy
Tunker	128	Tullygarvey	Annagh	Cavan
Ture	238	Lower Loughtee	Drumlane	Cavan
Ture	115	Tullyhaw	Killinagh	Enniskillen
Turfad	374	Clankee	Knockbride	Cootehill
Turin	192	Clanmahon	Ballymachugh	Cavan
Tyllycoe	145	Upper Loughtee	Annagelliff	Cavan
Tyllycoe	203	Tullygarvey	Larah	Cootehill
Unshinagh	120	Upper Loughtee	Castleterra	Cavan
Unshinagh	108	Tullyhaw	Killinagh	Enniskillen
Unshogagh	460	Tullyhaw	Killinagh	Enniskillen
Uragh (Kinawley)	147	Tullyhaw	Kinawley	Bawnboy
Uragh	117	Lower Loughtee	Drumlane	Cavan
Urbal	388	Clanmahon	Ballintemple	Cavan
Urcher	342	Clankee	Bailieborough	Bailieborough
Urhannagh	68	Tullyhaw	Templeport	Bawnboy
Urney	246	Clanmahon	Kilmore	Cavan
Urney	142	Upper Loughtee	Urney	Cavan
**Virginia**	Town	Castlerahan	Lurgan	Oldcastle
Virginia	244	Castlerahan	Lurgan	Oldcastle
Woodland	147	Tullyhunco	Killashandra	Cavan
Woodworths Island	2	Castlerahan	Lurgan	Oldcastle
Woteraghy	328	Clanmahon	Ballintemple	Cavan
Yewer Glebe	137	Tullyhunco	Killashandra	Cavan
