= Drumkilly =

Townland in County Cavan, Ireland

Coordinates: 53°53′28.3″N 7°21′2.14″W

Drumkilly (Irish: Droim Choiligh) is a townland and rural community in County Cavan, Ireland.

Situated in the civil parish of Crosserlough, Drumkilly has a church, St. Joseph's, and a school, St. Joseph's N.S., which are located beside each other in the townland of Drumkilly.

Drumkilly had a Gaelic football team in the past, but since the 1950s, footballers from the area have played with Crosserlough GFC. An attempt was made in 1987 to reform the Drumkilly team, but the motion was narrowly defeated at a Cavan County Board vote.
