= Drumcarban =

Drumcarban Droim Chearbán
- Townland
- Location in Ireland
- Coordinates: 53°56′13″N 7°26′53″W
- Country: Ireland
- Province: Ulster
- County: County Cavan
- Elevation: 112 m (367 ft)

Population (2006)
  - Total: 556
- Time zone: UTC+0 (WET)
  - Summer (DST): UTC-1 (IST (WEST))
- Irish Grid Reference: N3698

Drumcarban (Irish: Droim Chearbán, meaning 'ridge of buttercups') is a townland in County Cavan, Ireland, in the electoral division of the same name. The townland lies west of the R154 regional road. Neighbouring townlands are (clockwise, starting in the north): Cornamucklagh, Newtown, Drumbar, Coolnacarrick, Legaweel, Legaginny, Lackan Lower, and Drumcrow. On the boundary with the latter lies White Lough.
