= Clowney =

Clowney is a Scottish and English surname. Notable people with the surname include:

- David Clowney (born 1985), American football player
- Edmund Clowney (1917–2005), American theologian, educator, and pastor
- Jadeveon Clowney (born 1993), American football player
- Noah Clowney (born 2004), American basketball player
- William K. Clowney (1797–1851), American politician
