= Lisball =

Irish town in County Cavan

Coordinates: 53.9358°N 6.94185°W

Lisball (Irish: Lios Balla) is a townland in the civil parish of Bailieborough, barony of Clankee, County Cavan, Ireland. It has an area of 321.91 hectares (795.45 acres). In the 1911 Census of Ireland, Lisball had a population of 121.
