= Lisnahederna =

Townland in County Cavan, Ireland

Lisnahederna (Irish: Lios na hEadarnaidhe, meaning 'ringfort of the ambush') is a townland in County Cavan, Ireland. It is approximately 280 acres (1 km^{2}) in area and is located in the civil parish of Mullagh and the historical barony of Castlerahan. As of the 2011 census, it had a population of 28 people in 9 occupied houses.
