= Drumbess =

Townland in Corr, County Cavan, Ireland

Coordinates: 53.9676°N 7.5160°W

Drumbess is a townland in the civil parish of Killeshandra in County Cavan, Ireland. It is approximately 2.4 square kilometres (0.9 sq mi) in area. As of the 2011 census, it had a population of 59 people in 17 houses.
