= Drumlion =

Townland in County Roscommon, Ireland

Coordinates: 53.9237°N 8.1432°W

Drumlion (Irish: Droim Laighean) is a townland in north County Roscommon in the parish of Killukin and the barony of Boyle. It is within the former Gaelic territory of Magh Luirg, also known as Síol Muireadhaigh. The surrounding countryside is dotted with many historical monuments such as ring forts (ráthanna) and fairy forts (liosanna). Drumlins are a prominent feature of the terrain along with many small streams feeding into the River Shannon.

The name of the townland is associated with the Táin Bó Cúailnge. As Queen Medbh assembled her forces for her invasion of Ulster a group of men coming to join her army from the province of Leinster camped on the highest ridge in the townland. It was from this action that Drumlion received its Irish name, as Droim Laighean translates into the "Ridge of the men of Leinster".

Drumlion has an area of 94.01 ha (232.3 acres). Located in the townland is St. Michael's Church and Drumlion Graveyard. The area is sparsely populated.

== See also ==
- Boyle, County Roscommon
