= Crosserlough =

Civil parish in County Cavan, Ireland

Crosserlough Cill Droim Feartáin
- Civil parish
- Location in Ireland
- Coordinates: 53.877°N 7.290°W
- Country: Ireland
- Province: Ulster
- County: County Cavan

Crosserlough (Irish: Cill Droim Feartáin, meaning 'church of the ridge of the burial mound'), historically known as Cros Ar Loch, is a large civil parish in southern County Cavan in Ireland. It is located between Ballyjamesduff and Lough Sheelin. The parish consists of the village of Kilnaleck, the townland of Drumkilly and the small settlement of Crosserlough. The latter is at the northern edge of the eponymous townland.

== History ==
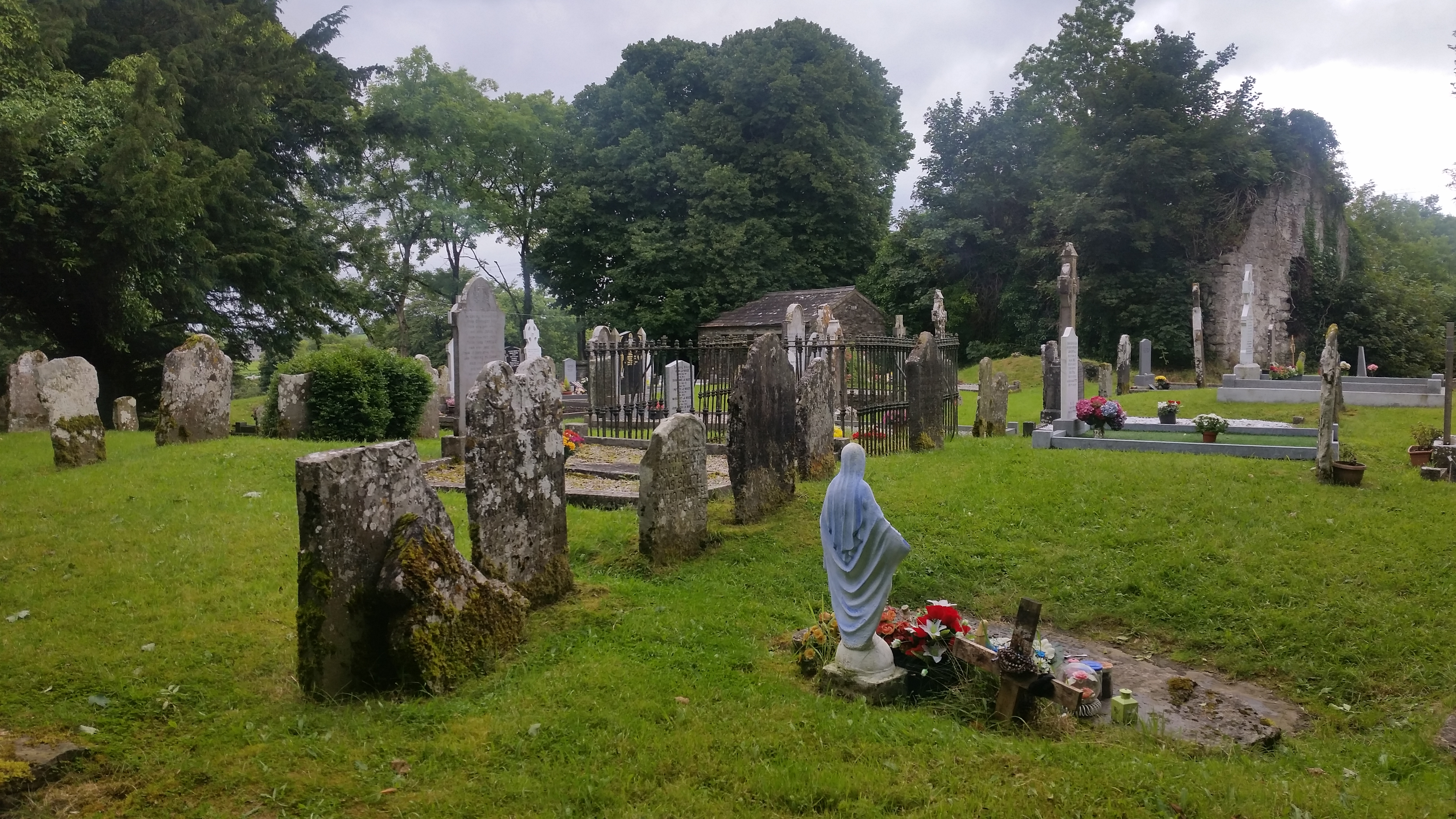
Kill graveyard near Kilnaleck with the remains of a church

Historical sites in Crosserlough include dolmen (portal tomb) sites in Duffcastle and Kildrumferton and several ring forts throughout the parish. There is also a mass rock from the time of the Penal Laws in Lehery. Kill Cemetery is associated with a number of folktales, including the shooting of a priest for saying mass during the Penal era.

== Facilities ==
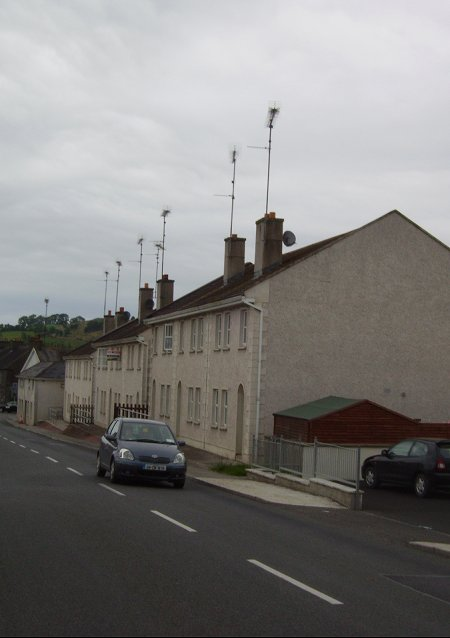
Kilnaleck village is in Crosserlough

There are three Catholic churches in Crosserlough, which is a Catholic parish in the Diocese of Kilmore. These include St Mary's Church (the main parish church built in 1888) in the townland of Cullow, in the Crosserlough area. The other two Catholic churches are in the village of Kilnaleck (St Patrick's) and in Drumkilly (St Joseph's). There is also a Church of Ireland church, at Kildrumferton, which was rebuilt in 1812.

The national (primary) schools in the parish are located at Kilnaleck, Drumkilly and Crosserlough. There are also several pubs, grocery shops, a post office, a pharmacy, a butcher's shop, a garage, barbers, drapery shop, a number of takeaway restaurants, a hairdresser, a beautician and a car dealership in Kilnaleck.

== Sport ==
The local Gaelic Athletic Association (GAA) club is Crosserlough GFC. The club has won the Cavan Senior Football Championship on several occasions, including 7 back-to-back titles from 1966 to 1972. Crosserlough also fields a Ladies Gaelic football team, which won the Cavan Senior Ladies' Football Championship in 2021. Crosserlough GFC has its grounds outside Kilnaleck village. Innyvale Athletic Club is also based in Kilnaleck.

== People ==
- John Comiskey, a Chicago-based Democratic politician, and father of Charles Comiskey, owner of the Chicago White Sox in the early part of the 20th century, was born here in 1826 and emigrated to the US in the mid-19th century.
