= Corratillan =

Townland in County Cavan, Ireland

Coordinates: 54.115858°N 7.752083°W

Corratillan (from Irish Corr an tSileáin, meaning 'The Hill of the Rivulet or Brook') is a townland in the civil parish of Templeport, County Cavan, Ireland. It lies in the Roman Catholic parish of Corlough and barony of Tullyhaw.

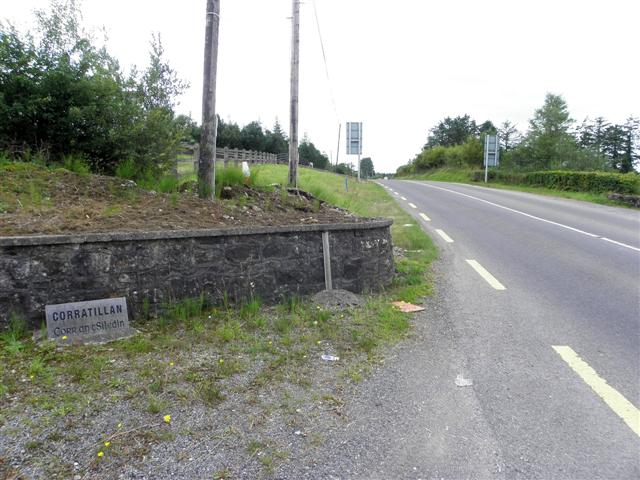

== Geography ==
Corratillan is bounded on the west by Cornacleigh and Cronery townlands, on the north by Knockmore, County Cavan townland and on the east by Culliagh, Muineal and Teeboy townlands. Its chief geographical features are the River Blackwater, County Cavan, forestry plantations and spring wells. Corratillan is traversed by the R202 road (Ireland) and rural lanes. The townland covers 182 statute acres. The sub-divisions of the townland are- Parknaloochra (Páirc na Luachra = The Field of the Rushes); Cronamuck (Cró na Muc = The Pigsty); Whinny Hill.

== History ==
The 1614 Ulster Plantation grants list the townland as Corrytillan.

The 1652 Commonwealth Survey lists the name as Corratellane.

In the Plantation of Ulster by grant dated 24 February 1614, King James VI and I granted, inter alia, one pole of Corrytillan to Tirlagh McHugh McBryan Bane O’Reylie. Tirlagh O’Reilly was the great-great-great grandson of the chief of the O'Reilly clan, Seoan mac Pilib O’Reilly, who ruled East Breifne from 1392–1400. His genealogy is Toirdhealbhach Óg son of Aodh son of Brian Bán son of Conchobhar Óg of Bealach an Fheada son of Conchobhar Mór son of Seaán son of Phillip son of Giolla Íosa Ruadh son of Domhnall son of Cathal na Beithighe. Tirlagh O’Reilly’s sons were Aodh, Brian and Seaán. The O’Reilly lands in Corratillan were confiscated in the Cromwellian Act for the Settlement of Ireland 1652 and were distributed as follows-

The 1652 Commonwealth Survey lists the proprietor as Captain Payne and the tenant as Roger Dolan.

In the Hearth Money Rolls compiled on 29 September 1663 there were two Hearth Tax payers in Cortellan- John McClyn and Hony McGawran.

A deed by Thomas Enery dated 29 Jan 1735 includes the lands of Caratellan.

A deed by John Enery dated 13 December 1774 includes the lands of Coratellan.

The 1790 Cavan Carvaghs list spells the name as Cortelan.

A lease dated 17 September 1816 John Enery of Bawnboy includes Cortellan otherwise Curratellian. The Tithe Applotment Books for 1827 list seventeen tithepayers in the townland. The 1836 Ordnance Survey Namebooks describe the townland as- The townland is bounded on the east, north and west sides by a large stream. The Corratillan Valuation Office Field books are available for September 1839. The landlord of Corratillan in the mid-19th century was Sir Thomas Finlay.

In 1841 the population of the townland was 101, being 44 males and 57 females. There were nineteen houses in the townland, all of which were inhabited. In 1851 the population of the townland was 80, being 30 males and 50 females, the reduction being due to the Great Famine (Ireland). There were fifteen houses in the townland, all were inhabited. Griffith's Valuation of 1857 lists twenty three landholders in the townland. In 1861 the population of the townland was 58, being 31 males and 27 females. There were fourteen houses in the townland and all were inhabited. In the 1901 census of Ireland, there are eleven families listed in the townland, and in the 1911 census of Ireland, there are eleven families listed in the townland.

Folk tales relating to Corratillan can be found at and

A noted resident of the townland was Dr. Curran, a local poet in the 1860s.

== Antiquities ==
1. The site of Corratillan National School.
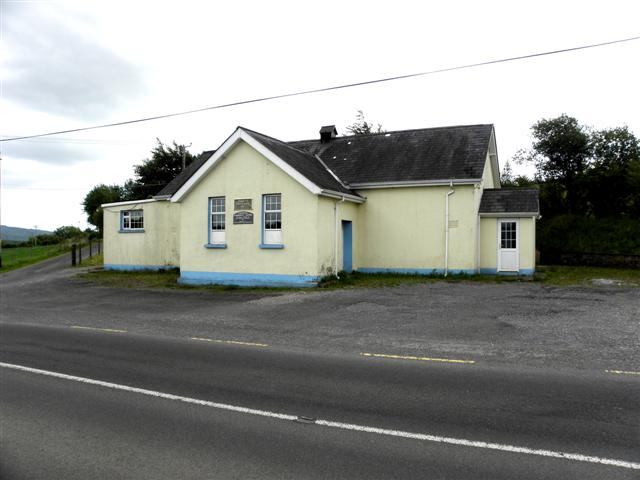
  Corlough Community Centre (geograph 3610994)
  The 1930s Schools folklore collection for Corratillan school is available at and
2. Stepping Stones across the river
3. Corlough Gaelic Football Club
