= Cronery =

Townland in the civil parish of Templeport, County Cavan, Ireland

Coordinates: 54.110°N 7.757°W

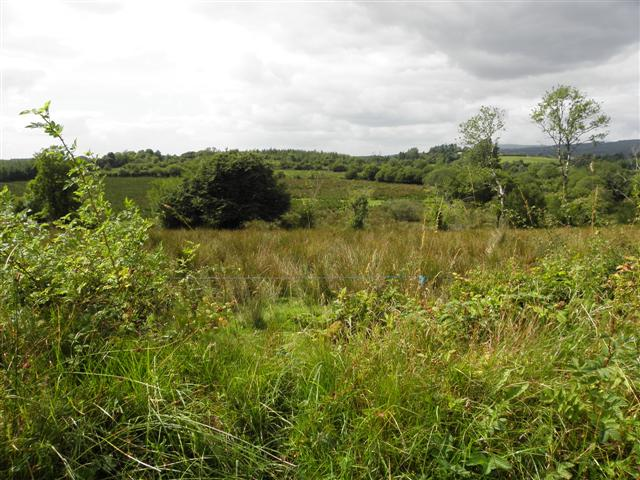
Countryside in the southern part of Cronery

Cronery (from Irish Cró an Aoire meaning 'The Shepherd’s Hut') is a townland in the civil parish of Templeport, County Cavan, Ireland. It lies in the Roman Catholic parish of Corlough and barony of Tullyhaw. The local pronunciation is Crinnera.

== Geography ==
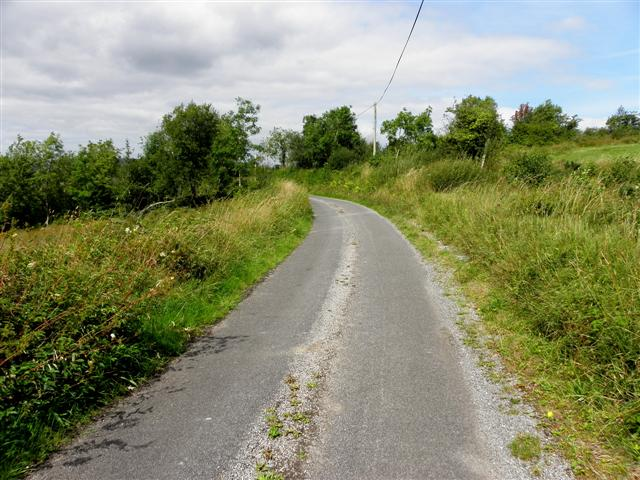
A minor road in the southeast of Cronery

Cronery is bounded on the north by Corratillan townland, on the west by Cartronnagilta, Cornacleigh and Derrinivver townlands, on the south by Drumlaydan and Sradrinan townlands and on the east by Culliagh townland. Its chief geographical features are the River Blackwater, County Cavan, forestry plantations, dug wells and spring wells. Cronery is traversed by the R202 road (Ireland) and rural lanes. The townland covers 188 statute acres.

== History ==
In medieval times the McGovern barony of Tullyhaw was divided into economic taxation areas called ballibetoes, from the Irish Baile Biataigh (Anglicized as 'Ballybetagh'), meaning 'A Provisioner's Town or Settlement'. The original purpose was to enable the farmer, who controlled the baile, to provide hospitality for those who needed it, such as poor people and travellers. The ballybetagh was further divided into townlands farmed by individual families who paid a tribute or tax to the head of the ballybetagh, who in turn paid a similar tribute to the clan chief. The steward of the ballybetagh would have been the secular equivalent of the erenagh in charge of church lands. There were seven ballibetoes in the parish of Templeport. Cronery was located in the ballybetagh of Ballymackgonghan (Irish = Baile Mac Eochagain, meaning 'McEoghan's Town').

The 1609 Baronial Map depicts the townland as part of the four polls of BMcGoagh (an abbreviation of Ballemagoechan).

The 1659 Down Survey map depicts the townland as Carmarie and Carmary.

William Petty's 1685 map depicts it as Carmarie.

A map of the townland drawn in 1813 is in the National Archives of Ireland, Beresford Estate Maps, depicts the townland as Crunnary or Carmarie.

In the Plantation of Ulster by grant dated 13 March 1610, King James VI and I granted four polls of Ballemagoechan to Cahell M'Owen O Reyly. The four polls consisted of 1 in Bealaghlyan, 2 in Acoylagh and 1 in Cronarry, totalling 200 acres. The said Cathal O'Reilly was the nephew of two chiefs of the O'Reilly clan- Aodh Connallach mac Maolmhordha who was chief from 1565–1583 and Eamonn mac Maolmhordha who was chief from 1596–1601. He was also a brother of Cathaoir O'Reilly who received lands in Kildoagh townland and first cousin of Donill Backagh McShane O'Reyly who was simultaneously granted lands in Burren (townland).

An Inquisition of King Charles I of England held in Cavan Town on 31 March 1635 stated that Cahell O Reily was seized in his lifetime of (inter alia) one poll of Cronarry. He died 1 January 1634 and his son Hugh O'Reily had reached his majority and was married.

The O'Reilly lands in Cronery were confiscated in the Cromwellian Act for the Settlement of Ireland 1652 and were distributed as follows-

The 1652 Commonwealth Survey lists the townland (spelled Cronory) as belonging to Lieutenant-Colonel Tristram Beresford.

A grant dated 7 July 1669 was made from King Charles II of England to John Skeffington, 2nd Viscount Massereene for 33 acres and 3 roods of profitable land and 93 acres 1 rood and 28 perches of unprofitable land in Carmary.

A deed by Thomas Enery dated 29 Jan 1735 includes the lands of Cronery.

A lease dated 10 December 1774 from William Crookshank to John Enery of Bawnboy includes the lands of Cronery. A further deed by John Enery dated 13 December 1774 includes the lands of Cranery.

The 1790 Cavan Carvaghs list spells the name as Cronerry.

A lease dated 17 September 1816 John Enery of Bawnboy includes Cronery.

The Tithe Applotment Books for 1827 list twenty-one tithepayers in the townland.

The 1836 Ordnance survey Namebooks state- The townland is bounded on the east side by a large stream.

The Cronery Valuation Office Field books are available for October 1839.

In 1841 the population of the townland was 95, being 44 males and 51 females. There were eighteen houses in the townland, one of which was uninhabited.

In 1851 the population of the townland was 102, being 52 males and 50 females. There were eighteen houses in the townland, all were inhabited.

Griffith's Valuation of 1857 lists twenty-seven landholders in the townland.

In 1861 the population of the townland was 88, being 46 males and 42 females. There were nineteen houses in the townland, of which two were uninhabited.

In the 1901 census of Ireland, there are thirteen families listed in the townland, and in the 1911 census of Ireland, there are sixteen families listed in the townland.

== Antiquities ==
1. A Malt-kiln
2. Stepping stones over the river
3. The site of a blacksmith’s forge.
