= Teeboy =

Townland in the civil parish of Templeport, County Cavan, Ireland

Coordinates: 54.07514°N 7.810271°W

Teeboy (from Irish Tí Buí meaning The Yellow House) is a townland in the civil parish of Templeport, County Cavan, Ireland. It lies in the Roman Catholic parish of Corlough and barony of Tullyhaw. The local pronunciation is Tubwee.

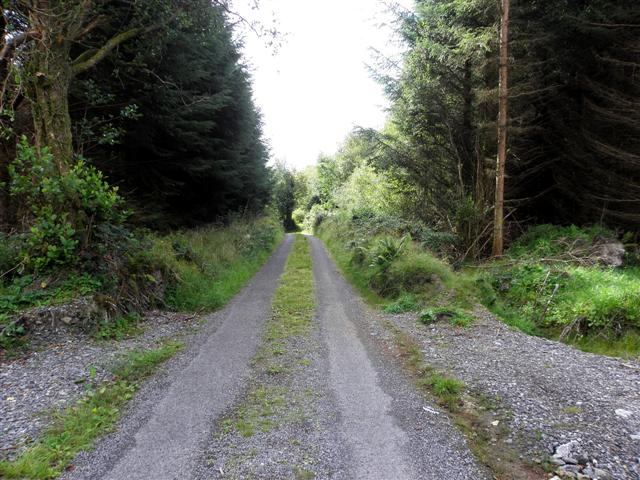
Teeboy townland, Corlough parish, County Cavan, Ireland. Heading east

== Geography ==
Teeboy is bounded on the north by Arderry townland, on the west by Corratillan, Culliagh and Muineal townlands and on the east by Drumlougher, Gortnacargy and Tirnawannagh townlands. Its chief geographical features are Bunerky Lough (Irish = Loch Bun Adhairc = The Lake of the Butt of the Horn), the River Blackwater, County Cavan, forestry plantations, small streams, a gravel pit, spring wells and dug wells. Teeboy is traversed by minor public roads and rural lanes. The townland covers 472 statute acres. The sub-divisions in the townland are Whitepark; Blackpark; Rock Field; Kilepark; The Gurteens (Guirtíní = The Small Gardens); Cruckane (Cnocán = The Little Hill); Poolaphouca (Poll an Phúca = The Púca's Hollow in the Fort); Torreewa (Tor Riabhach = The Speckled Hill); Curraghstill (Currach a sTéill = The Bog of the Division); Mallai Buidhe - a field owned by Mr Peter McGovern in 1938, covered with yellow ragwort Jacobaea vulgaris.

== History ==
In medieval times the McGovern barony of Tullyhaw was divided into economic taxation areas called ballibetoes, from the Irish Baile Biataigh (Anglicized as 'Ballybetagh'), meaning 'A Provisioner's Town or Settlement'. The original purpose was to enable the farmer, who controlled the baile, to provide hospitality for those who needed it, such as poor people and travellers. The ballybetagh was further divided into townlands farmed by individual families who paid a tribute or tax to the head of the ballybetagh, who in turn paid a similar tribute to the clan chief. The steward of the ballybetagh would have been the secular equivalent of the erenagh in charge of church lands. There were seven ballibetoes in the parish of Templeport. Teeboy was located in the ballybetagh of Bally Gortnekargie (Irish "Gort na Carraige", meaning 'The Field of the Rock').

The 1609 Ulster Plantation Baronial Map depicts the townland as Teeboy.

The 1665 Down Survey map depicts it as Toeboy.

Another name for the townland was Aghadrumderg (Irish- Achadh Droma Deirg = The Field of the Red Ridge).

In the Plantation of Ulster by grant dated 4 June 1611, King James VI and I granted, inter alia, two polls of Tewbay to Breene Og Magauran, gentleman. He was the son of Brian Óg Mág Samhradháin who was chief of the McGovern clan until his death in 1584 (On 30 April 1605 King James VI and I had granted a pardon to him as Brian McGaran of Tolaghagh, for fighting against the King's forces.). An Inquisition held in Cavan Town on 24 October 1631 found that the said Brian Óg McGovern by deed of trust dated 20 November 1614 granted the lands of Lissconnaught (Irish= 'Lios Connachta', meaning The Fort of the Descendants of Conn), comprising 2 polls in Owengallees, 2 polls in Teeboy townland and a half poll in Bartonny, to the use of himself and his wife Mary O'Birn and after their death for their son Edmond McGovern, born in 1616. The said Brian Óg McGovern died on 1 October 1631.

The aforesaid McGovern lands in Teeboy were confiscated in the Cromwellian Act for the Settlement of Ireland 1652 and were distributed as follows-

The 1652 Commonwealth Survey depicts the townland as Tewboy with the proprietor being Lieutenant-Colonel Tristram Beresford.

A grant dated 7 July 1669 from King Charles II to John, Lord Viscount Massareene included 2 poles comprising three parcels of land being 345 acres 1 rood and 28 perches, 10 acres 1 rood of profitable land and 9 acres 2 roods and 32 perches of unprofitable land in Toebegg.

A deed by Thomas Enery dated 29 Jan 1735 includes the lands of Teeboy.

A lease dated 10 December 1774 from William Crookshank to John Enery of Bawnboy includes the lands of Teeboy. A further deed by John Enery dated 13 December 1774 includes the lands of the two poles of Teebay.

The 1790 Cavan Carvaghs list spells the name as Tewboy.

A lease dated 17 September 1816 John Enery of Bawnboy includes Teeboy otherwise called Tuboy otherwise the two Tubboys.

The Tithe Applotment Books for 1827 list thirty-six tithepayers in the townland.

The 1836 Ordnance survey Namebooks state-The soil is light and is intermixed with lime stone...There is a large lake on the east side of the townland.

The Teeboy Valuation Office Field books are available for October 1839.

In 1841 the population of the townland was 180, being 85 males and 95 females. There were thirty-four houses in the townland, all were inhabited.

In 1851 the population of the townland was 150, being 71 males and 79 females, the reduction being due to the Great Famine (Ireland). There were thirty houses in the townland, of which one was uninhabited.

In the 19th century the landlord of Teeboy was Sir Thomas Finlay.

Griffith's Valuation of 1857 lists fifty-six landholders in the townland.

In 1861 the population of the townland was 166, being 78 males and 88 females. There were twenty-seven houses in the townland and all were inhabited.

In 1871 the population of the townland was 149, being 76 males and 73 females. There were twenty-three houses in the townland and all were inhabited.(page 296 of census)

In 1881 the population of the townland was 139, being 71 males and 68 females. There were twenty-four houses in the townland, one of which was uninhabited.

In 1891 the population of the townland was 123, being 59 males and 64 females. There were twenty-three houses in the townland, one of which was uninhabited.

In the 1901 census of Ireland, there are twenty-five families listed in the townland, and in the 1911 census of Ireland, there are twenty-four families listed in the townland.

Teeboy folklore from the 1930s is available at

An account of Sean Dolan, the Seanchaí of Teeboy (b.1827) is available at-

== Antiquities ==
1. An earthen fort, described in the 1995 'Archaeological Inventory of County Cavan' (Site no. 1125) as- Raised circular area (int. diam. 24.9m) enclosed by an earthen bank and a fosse identifiable only from S-WSW and infilled elsewhere. Site has been destroyed by road building from NE-E-SE. Break in bank at W may represent original entrance.
2. A crannog in Bunerky Lough.
3. The site of Teeboy hedge-school. The 1930s Dúchas collection states-In the townland of Teeboy near the place where Hugh Smith's house is now there was an old hedge-school. The teacher was called Thomas Smith. The children paid him by bringing him his food, tobacco, and other necessaries. Each child on his turn, brought the teacher home with him for his night's lodging. The school was held in a sheltered place behind a ditch. The ditch served as a back wall, and a mud wall was built on each side of that. The pupils probably sat on the floor. The Second Report from the Commissioners of Irish Education Inquiry, 1826 lists the headmaster of Fieboy (sic) school as Thomas Smith, a Roman Catholic. His pay was £5 per annum. There were 43 Roman Catholic pupils of which 34 were boys and 9 girls. The schoolhouse was described as built of mud walls and cost £5 to be erected.
4. A foot-bridge over the river
5. Stepping Stones over the river
