= Drumlaydan =

Townland in the civil parish of Templeport, County Cavan, Ireland

Coordinates: 54.07514°N 7.810271°W

Drumlaydan (from Irish Droim Uí Léadáin meaning 'The Hill belonging to Liadáin') is a townland in the civil parish of Templeport, County Cavan, Ireland. It is also called Bonebrook locally. It lies in the Roman Catholic parish of Corlough and barony of Tullyhaw.

== Geography ==
Drumlaydan is bounded on the north by Culliagh and Cronery townlands, on the west by Sradrinan townland in County Leitrim, on the south by Sraloaghan townland in County Leitrim and on the east by Bellaleenan and Torrewa townlands. Its chief geographical features are the River Blackwater, County Cavan, a stream, a mill-race, forestry plantations, a quarry and a spring well. Drumlaydan is traversed by minor roads and rural lanes. The townland covers 125 statute acres.

== History ==
In medieval times the McGovern barony of Tullyhaw was divided into economic taxation areas called ballibetoes, from the Irish Baile Biataigh (Anglicized as 'Ballybetagh'), meaning 'A Provisioner's Town or Settlement'. The original purpose was to enable the farmer, who controlled the baile, to provide hospitality for those who needed it, such as poor people and travellers. The ballybetagh was further divided into townlands farmed by individual families who paid a tribute or tax to the head of the ballybetagh, who in turn paid a similar tribute to the clan chief. The steward of the ballybetagh would have been the secular equivalent of the erenagh in charge of church lands. There were seven ballibetoes in the parish of Templeport. Drumlaydan was located in the ballybetagh of Ballymackgonghan (Irish = Baile Mac Eochagain, meaning 'McEoghan's Town').

The 1652 Commonwealth Survey lists the townland as Dromledane and the proprietor as Lieutenant-Colonel Tristram Beresford.

In the Hearth Money Rolls compiled on 29 September 1663 there was one taxpayer in the townland- Feragh McGowan of Dromledan.

On 10 April 1716, Marcus Beresford, 1st Earl of Tyrone the son of the aforesaid Sir Tristram Beresford, 1st Baronet, granted a lease for lives of certain lands, including Drumledan, to James Kirkwood of Owen Gally (Owengallees). In a marriage settlement made 18 Oct 1718 with his wife Katherine (née Lowther), the said James Kirkwood settled the lands, including Drumledan, on his children. Katherine Lowther's sister-in-law, Jane Lowther (née Beresford), was the daughter of the aforesaid Sir Tristram Beresford, which is probably how the lease came about. James Kirkwood was son of Reverend James Kirkwood, Chaplain to King William III of England, Prebendary of Kilskeery and Rector of Magheracross parishes in County Fermanagh from 1693.

The 1790 Cavan Carvaghs list spells the name as Dromledan.

Lowther Kirkwood of Mullinagrave, parish of Templeport, Co. Cavan, gentleman made the following will-

2 July 1804. To his grandnephew Lowther Brien, city of Dublin, attorney, and his heirs his lands of Awengallis, Ballylenan, Ballymagirill, Stranadarragh, Carnagimlie, Cullagh, Drumleden, Leitry, Corlagh, Lananleragh, Gowlanlea and Drumlogher, Co. Cavan, held under lease from the Beresford family. He had begun a suit in Chancery, Ireland, against John Brien, late of Salvon, Co. Fermanagh, deceased, for setting aside a fraudulent deed obtained by said John Brien, which suit against the representatives is to be continued by said Lowther Brien, his sole exor. Witnesses: John Johnston and Andrew Rutledge, both of Ballymagiril, and Thos. Stephenson, Drumleaden, Co. Cavan, gent. Memorial witnessed by: said Andrew Rutledge, and John Balfour, city of Dublin, attorney.

The Tithe Applotment Books for 1827 list six tithepayers in the townland.

The 1836 Ordnance Survey Namebooks state- It is bounded on the south and west sides by a large stream in the bed of which limestone can be procured.

The Drumlaydan Valuation Office Field books are available for 1839–1840.

In 1841 the population of the townland was 39, being 21 males and 18 females. There were six houses in the townland, all of which were inhabited.

In 1851 the population of the townland was 3, being 2 males and 1 female, the reduction being due to the Great Famine (Ireland). There was one house in the townland, it was inhabited.

Griffith's Valuation of 1857 lists two landholders in the townland.

On 6 July 1857 the Incumbered Estates Commission published the following notice-

In the Matter of the Estate of James Brien, Geo. Brien, Edward Brien and Francis Brien, Owners. Exparte by Isabella Crummer, Petitioner. The commissioners having ordered a Sale of the Lands of Shanadaragh and Curnagunlogh, Cullegh, Drumlohgher, Drumledin, Sananaragh, and Drumledin and Corlough, situate in the Barony of Tullyhaw, and County of Cavan, held under lease dated 10 April 1718, from the Bishop Raphoe, for lives renewable for ever, and which Lands are included in the denominations of Ballymagord, Owngally, Gortneglough, Drumedin or Ballylennin, in said lease mentioned:

In 1861 the population of the townland was 14, being 8 males and 6 females. There were two houses in the townland and both were inhabited.

In the 1901 census of Ireland, there are six families listed in the townland, and in the 1911 census of Ireland, there are five families listed in the townland.

== Antiquities ==
1. Bonebrook Bridge built c.1850
2. Bonebrook House
3. A footbridge across the Mill-Race
4. Stepping Stones across the river
5. Drumlaydan National School, Roll No. 11,323. In 1886 there was one male teacher, a Roman Catholic. There were 154 pupils, 89 boys and 65 girls. In 1890 there were 154 pupils.
