= Cartronnagilta =

Townland in County Cavan, Ireland

Cartronnagilta (from Irish Ceathrú na gCoillte, meaning 'The Quarterland of the Woods') is a townland in the civil parish of Templeport, County Cavan, Ireland. It lies in the Roman Catholic parish of Corlough and barony of Tullyhaw. The local pronunciation is Carthoonnaghilta.

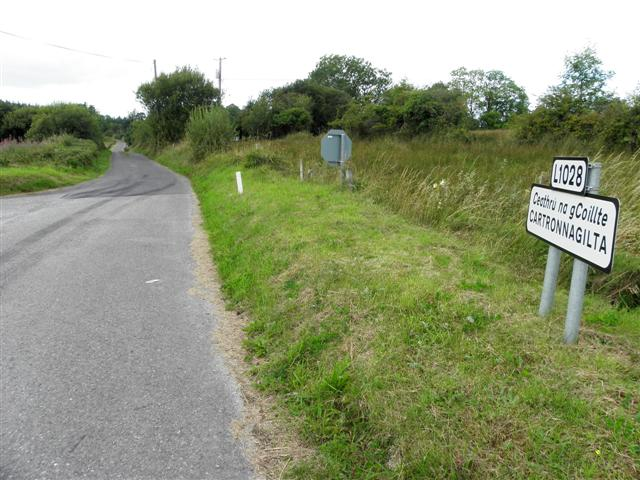
Geograph-3610979-by-Kenneth--Allen. L1028 road at Cartronnagilta townland, parish of Corlough, County Cavan, Ireland. Heading WSW from the R202 road.

== Geography ==
Cartronnagilta is bounded on the north by Leitra, Corlough and Corrachomera townlands, on the west by Corraleehan and Greaghnadoony townlands, on the south by Coragh townland and on the east by Cornacleigh, Cronery and Derrinivver townlands. Its chief geographical features are a stream, forestry plantations, gravel pits, a spring well and dug wells. Cartronnagilta is traversed by the L1028 public road and rural lanes. The townland covers 241 statute acres.

== History ==
In medieval times the McGovern barony of Tullyhaw was divided into economic taxation areas called ballibetoes, from the Irish Baile Biataigh (Anglicized as 'Ballybetagh'), meaning 'A Provisioner's Town or Settlement'. The original purpose was to enable the farmer, who controlled the baile, to provide hospitality for those who needed it, such as poor people and travellers. The ballybetagh was further divided into townlands farmed by individual families who paid a tribute or tax to the head of the ballybetagh, who in turn paid a similar tribute to the clan chief. The steward of the ballybetagh would have been the secular equivalent of the erenagh in charge of church lands. There were seven ballibetoes in the parish of Templeport. Cartronnagilta was located in the ballybetagh of Ballymackgonghan (Irish = Baile Mac Eochagain, meaning 'McEoghan's Town').

The 1658 Down Survey map depicts the townland as Carraghill.

William Petty's 1685 map spells it as Caraghill.

The 1652 Commonwealth Survey spells the townland as Corconny and lists the proprietor as Lieutenant-Colonel Tristram Beresford with the tenants as William Chambers & others.

A grant dated 3 November 1666 was made by King Charles II of England to aforesaid Sir Tristram Beresford, 1st Baronet which included, inter alia, the lands of Croghwill alias Carwill containing 1 cartron of 97 acres 1 rood 28 perches. By grant dated 11 September 1670 from King Charles II of England to said Sir Tristram Beresford, the said lands of Gloghwill or Corwill were included in the creation of a new Manor of Beresford.

A grant dated 7 July 1669 from King Charles II to John, Lord Viscount Massareene included 169 acres in Caraghill.

A deed by Thomas Enery dated 29 Jan 1735 includes the lands of Cartonnegeelty.

A lease dated 10 December 1774 from William Crookshank to John Enery of Bawnboy includes the lands of Cartonnegeelty otherwise Corhonnegelty, as does a further deed by John Enery dated 13 December 1774.

The 1790 Cavan Carvaghs list spells the name as Cartunagelty.

A map of the townland drawn in 1813 is in the National Archives of Ireland, Beresford Estate Maps, which show the townland was formerly owned by the late Colonel Ennery and the present owner as John Finlay. The spellings are Carthoon, Gortoon and Curraghull.

A lease dated 17 September 1816 by John Enery of Bawnboy includes Cartennegeelty otherwise Curtennegeelty otherwise Gortunegelty.

The Tithe Applotment Books for 1827 spell the name as Cortune and Corlune and list thirteen tithepayers in the townland.

The 1836 Ordnance Survey Namebooks state- The townland is bounded on the north side by a large mountain stream.

The Cartronnagilta Valuation Office Field books are available for September 1839.

Griffith's Valuation of 1857 lists twenty-four landholders in the townland. The landlord in the 1850s was John Finlay.

== Census ==
Year	Population	Males	Females	Total Houses	Uninhabited
1841	106	54	52	17	0
1851	99	51	48	17	1
1861	87	54	33	18	0
1871	97	48	49	20	0
1881	103	50	53	21	0
1891	97	52	45	18	0

In the 1901 census of Ireland, there are twenty families listed in the townland.

In the 1911 census of Ireland, there are twenty families listed in the townland.

== Antiquities ==
1. Stepping Stones over the stream
