= Altinure =

- Townland

Irish transcription(s)
  - Derivation: Alt an Iúir
  - Meaning: "Glen of the Yew-tree"
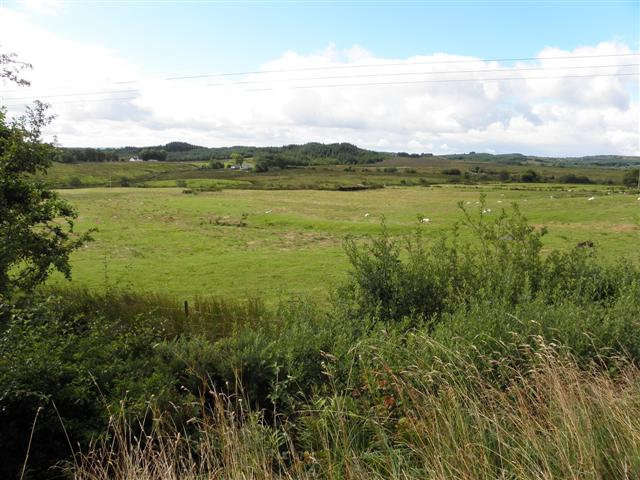
- Altinure Townland (Looking south in the direction of Tullyloughfin)

- Altinure shown within Republic of Ireland
- Coordinates: 54°09′30″N 7°45′38″W
- Country: Ireland
- County: County Cavan
- Barony: Tullyhaw
- Civil parish: Templeport

Area
  - Total: 107 ha (265 acres)

Altinure (from Irish Alt an Iúir, meaning 'Glen of the Yew-tree') is a townland in the civil parish of Templeport, County Cavan, Ireland. It lies in the Roman Catholic parish of Corlough and barony of Tullyhaw.

== Geography ==
Altinure is bounded on the north by Altbrean townland, on the west by Altachullion Lower townland, on the south by Altachullion Upper, Tullynamoltra and Drumbeagh townlands and on the east by Gubrawully townland. Its chief geographical features are a mountain trout stream which later joins the River Cladagh (Swanlinbar); a tributary burn or creek which joins the stream in the south of the townland; forestry plantations and small hills which rise to 160 feet above sea level. Altinure is bisected by the regional R200 road (Ireland)), a minor public road on the south and several rural lanes. The townland covers 265 statute acres.

== History ==
In earlier times the townland was probably uninhabited as it consists mainly of bog and poor clay soils. It was not seized by the English during the Plantation of Ulster in 1610 or in the Cromwellian Settlement of the 1660s so some dispossessed Irish families moved there and began to clear and farm the land. In the 18th & 19th centuries the landlord was Lord John Beresford, the Protestant Archbishop of Armagh. The muddled land history of the area prior to this is described in the 1838 Exchequer case, "Attorney General of Ireland v The Lord Primate". The maps used in the case are in the National Archives of Ireland, Beresford Estate Maps, which show the townland belonging to Lord John Beresford and leased to the Reverend J. Pollock.

A deed by Arthur Ellis dated 19 Mar 1768 includes the lands of Altanure.

A deed by Gore Ellis dated 24 Feb 1776 includes the lands of Altanure.

The Tithe Applotment Books for 1827 list the following tithepayers in the townland- Maguire, Magauran, McGoldrick.

The Ordnance Survey Name Books for 1836 give the following description of the townland- "Altinure. Alt an Iubhair which means Precipice of the Yew. Contains 266 acres; 52 are cultivated, 205 uncultivated and 9 acres of bog. Proprietor Lord John Beresford. Occupants are tenants-at-will and pay £1 for the whole townland. No tithe or cess is paid because it is a track mountain. There are poor crops of oats and potatoes. There is a large mountain torrent or stream runs through the centre of the townland."

The Altinure Valuation Office Field books are available for September 1839.

In 1841 the population of the townland was 55, being 29 males and 26 females. There were nine houses in the townland, all of which were inhabited.

In 1851 the population of the townland was 62, being 36 males and 26 females. There were eleven houses in the townland and all were inhabited.

Griffith's Valuation of 1857 lists the landholders in the townland as McGoldrick, King, Gilleece, Maguire and Curran.

In 1861 the population of the townland was 65, being 36 males and 29 females. There were eleven houses in the townland and all were inhabited.

In 1871 the population of the townland was 72, being 44 males and 28 females. There were eleven houses in the townland, all were inhabited.

In 1881 the population of the townland was 74, being 43 males and 31 females. There were fourteen houses in the townland, of which one was uninhabited.

In 1891 the population of the townland was 82, being 40 males and 42 females. There were fourteen houses in the townland, all were inhabited.

In the 1901 census of Ireland, there are fourteen families listed in the townland.

In the 1911 census of Ireland, there are eighteen families listed in the townland.

The chief structures of historical interest in the townland are old bridges and stepping stones across the river.
