= Tullynaconspod =

Townland in County Cavan, Ireland

Tullynaconspod (from Irish Tulaigh na Conspóide, meaning 'The Disputed Hill' or the 'Hill of the Controversy') is a townland in the civil parish of Templeport, County Cavan, Ireland. It lies in the Roman Catholic parish of Corlough and barony of Tullyhaw.

== Geography ==
Tullynaconspod is bounded on the north by Gowlan townland, on the west by Tullyveela townland, on the south by Corrachomera townland and on the east by Owencam townland. Its chief geographical features are mountain streams, gravel pits and dug wells. Tullynaconspod is traversed by minor public roads and rural lanes. The townland covers 140 statute acres.

== History ==
In earlier times the townland was probably uninhabited as it consists mainly of bog and poor clay soils. It was not seized by the English during the Plantation of Ulster in 1610 or in the Cromwellian Settlement of the 1660s so some dispossessed Irish families moved there and began to clear and farm the land.

The origin of the name probably arose from a battle fought there. The 1930s Dúchas Folklore collection states- A battle was fought in Crocán na gCamps, Derryconnessy, Corlough. Co. Cavan. It is supposed to have been fought between the Gael and Danes. When the cavalry were coming to Crocán na gCamps they had a row and fought a battle. The fought in Tullyvella and Conspud. It is not known which side won the battle, but they are still supposed to fight, at certain times of the year at night, and it is thought to be a bad sign of disturbance when dead people come back to fight. About 100–200 years ago battles were fought in the Townlands of Tullyvella and Conspud between the dead people who fought at the battle of Crocán na gCamps. In the morning after these battles were fought, the heather would be red with blood. One night there was a fight in Conspud and a man heard a voice calling him by his Christian name, that a neighbour's house was on fire. He looked out and saw the neighbour's house on fire, but he did not go to it. Next day the house was not burned, but was as if nothing happened.

The Tithe Applotment Books for 1827 list three tithepayers in the townland (which is named Disputed Hill in the Tithe Books).

The Ordnance Survey Name Books for 1836 give the following description of the townland- The soil is intermixed with lime and freestone...There is no county cess levied on this townland as it is considered only a track of mountain. It is bounded on the north by a large mountain stream.

The Tullynaconspod Valuation Office Field books are available for September 1839.

In 1841 the population of the townland was 55, being 33 males and 22 females. There were nine houses in the townland, all were inhabited.

In 1851 the population of the townland was 25, being 17 males and 8 females, the reduction being due to the Great Famine (Ireland). There were five houses in the townland, all inhabited.

Griffith's Valuation of 1857 lists seven landholders in the townland.

In 1861 the population of the townland was 22, being 12 males and 10 females. There were six houses in the townland and all were inhabited.

In 1871 the population of the townland was 20, being 8 males and 12 females. There were four houses in the townland and all were inhabited.(page 296 of census)

In 1881 the population of the townland was 34, being 16 males and 18 females. There were six houses in the townland, all were inhabited.

In 1891 the population of the townland was 27, being 15 males and 12 females. There were five houses in the townland, all were inhabited.

In the 1901 census of Ireland, there are five families listed in the townland.

In the 1911 census of Ireland, there are six families listed in the townland.
