= Altcrock =

Townland in the civil parish of Templeport, County Cavan, Ireland

Coordinates: 54°08′50″N 7°48′21″W

Altcrock (from Irish Alt Chnoc, meaning 'The Height of the Hill') is a townland in the civil parish of Templeport, County Cavan, Ireland. It lies in the Roman Catholic parish of Corlough and barony of Tullyhaw.

== Geography ==
Altcrock is bounded on the north by Altateskin townland, on the west by Derrynananta Lower and Gowlan townlands and on the east by Owencam townland. Its chief geographical features are Mullaghroe mountain, a small mountain lake, the Owensallagh river (A source of the River Blackwater, County Cavan), a mountain stream, waterfalls, forestry plantations, gravel pits, a spring and dug wells. Altcrock is traversed by the L1019 public road and rural lanes. The townland covers 569 statute acres. There are several sub-divisions in the townland, including Benn Altcrock (The Peak of Altcrock); The White House, a spring well where the gentry used to lunch when on shooting-parties. There was probably a hunting-lodge here; Peecennaconspudge (Piosa na Conspóide = The Spot of the Dispute). Excise and Revenue men used to sink the illegal poitín seizures here; The Eydhan (Éadan = A Hill Brow); Brucklagh (Broclagh = A Badger Sett); Pullahearan (Poll a hIarainn = The Iron Hole); Assagowlan (Eas a Gabhlán = The Waterfall of the River-Fork); Currveg (An Chorr Bheag = The Little Smooth Round Hill).

== History ==
In earlier times the townland was probably uninhabited as it consists mainly of bog and poor clay soils. It was not seized by the English during the Plantation of Ulster in 1610 or in the Cromwellian Settlement of the 1660s so some dispossessed Irish families moved there and began to clear and farm the land.

A lease dated 17 September 1816 John Enery of Bawnboy includes Altcrock.

The Tithe Applotment Books for 1826 list four tithepayers in the townland.

The Ordnance Survey Name Books for 1836 give the following description of the townland- The townland is bounded on the north and south sides by two large mountain streams, in the latter of which there is a fall of 30 feet and beside a small house in ruins on the north side of the townland there is a spring called Mullaghroe, which has the singular property of turning new milk into curds.

The Altcrock Valuation Office Field books are available for August 1839.

In 1841 the population of the townland was 54, being 31 males and 23 females. There were ten houses in the townland, of which one was uninhabited.

In 1851 the population of the townland was 57, being 30 males and 27 females. There were nine houses in the townland and all were inhabited.

Griffith's Valuation of 1857 lists eleven landholders in the townland.

In 1861 the population of the townland was 68, being 39 males and 29 females. There were ten houses in the townland and all were inhabited.

In 1871 the population of the townland was 67, being 32 males and 35 females. There were eleven houses in the townland, all were inhabited.

In 1881 the population of the townland was 66, being 35 males and 31 females. There were thirteen houses in the townland, all were inhabited.

In 1891 the population of the townland was 69, being 34 males and 35 females. There were fourteen houses in the townland, all were inhabited.

In the 1901 census of Ireland, there are thirteen families listed in the townland.

In the 1911 census of Ireland, there are fifteen families listed in the townland.

== Antiquities ==
The chief structures of historical interest in the townland are

1. A prehistoric cairn on the southern townland border with Gowlan, marked on the Ordnance survey 25" map as A Pile of Stones, reused as a boundary marker during the introduction of townland divisions, or it may be contemporaneous with this development.(Site number 120 in Archaeological Inventory of County Cavan, Patrick O’Donovan, 1995, where it is described as- Not marked on the OS 1836 or 1876 eds. Situated in precipitous mountain terrain on the border between the townlands of Altcrock and Gowlan. The site may represent a prehistoric cairn reused as a boundary marker during the introduction of townland divisions, or it may be contemporaneous with this development. Not visited.).Loading...
2. A lime kiln
3. Stepping stones over the streams
