= Corrachomera =

Townland in County Cavan, Ireland

Corrachomera (from Irish Currach Iomaire, meaning 'The Marshy Ridge') is a townland in the civil parish of Templeport, County Cavan, Ireland. It lies in the Roman Catholic parish of Corlough and barony of Tullyhaw. The local pronunciation is Currach-Humra.

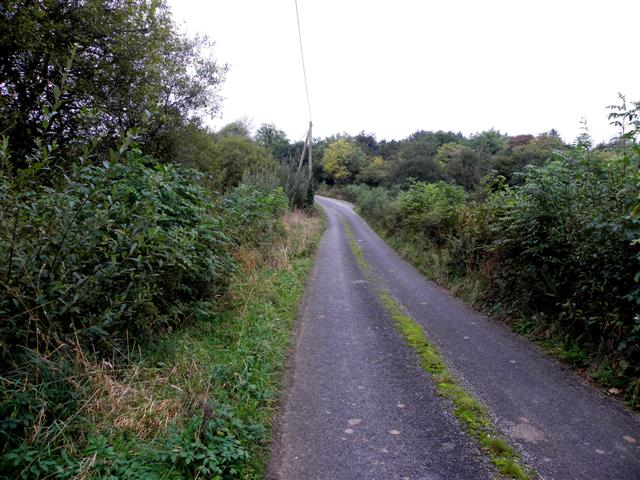
Road at Corrachomera townland, Corlough parish, County Cavan, Ireland. Heading north-west

== Geography ==
Corrachomera is bounded on the north by Owencam and Tullywaum townlands, on the west by Tullyveela and Tullynaconspod townlands, on the south by Cartronnagilta and Greaghnadoony townlands and on the east by Corlough townland, Leitra, Corlough and Tullytrasna townlands. Its chief geographical features are mountain streams, forestry plantations, gravel pits, dug wells and spring wells. Corrachomera is traversed by minor public roads and rural lanes. The townland covers 336 statute acres.

== History ==
In medieval times the McGovern barony of Tullyhaw was divided into economic taxation areas called ballibetoes, from the Irish Baile Biataigh (Anglicized as 'Ballybetagh'), meaning 'A Provisioner's Town or Settlement'. The original purpose was to enable the farmer, who controlled the baile, to provide hospitality for those who needed it, such as poor people and travellers. The ballybetagh was further divided into townlands farmed by individual families who paid a tribute or tax to the head of the ballybetagh, who in turn paid a similar tribute to the clan chief. The steward of the ballybetagh would have been the secular equivalent of the erenagh in charge of church lands. There were seven ballibetoes in the parish of Templeport. Corrachomera was located in the ballybetagh of Ballymackgonghan (Irish = Baile Mac Eochagain, meaning 'McEoghan's Town').

The 1652 Commonwealth Survey spells the name as Corcamderry and lists the proprietor as Lieutenant Arthur Newborogh and the tenant as John Trench, both of whom appear in other Templeport townlands in the same survey.

The 1658 Down Survey map depicts the townland as Curcanderry (Irish Corcach Doire meaning 'The Marsh of the Oakwood').

On 13 March 1706 Marcus Beresford, 1st Earl of Tyrone leased the lands of Curcandry alias Curranderry to Robert Saunders (Irish lawyer), one of the founders of the village of Swanlinbar, for a term of 99 years. Saunders' son Morley Saunders leased his interest in Coracomgery to Colonel John Enery of Bawnboy by deed dated 24 December 1720. Deeds, tenant lists etc. relating to Corrachomera from 1650 onwards are available at- by searching for Derryvella.

The 1790 Cavan Carvaghs list spells the townland name as Corcramgerry.

A map of the townland drawn in 1813 is in the National Archives of Ireland, Beresford Estate Maps, depicts the townland as Curraghcombera or Curcanderry and the owners as John Finlay and George Finlay and the previous owner as Colonel Ennery deceased.

The Tithe Applotment Books for 1826 list sixty-seven tithepayers in the townland.

The Ordnance Survey Name Books for 1836 give the following description of the townland- The townland is bounded on the S. side by a large mountain stream.

The Corrachomera Valuation Office Field books are available for September 1839.

In 1841 the population of the townland was 138, being 62 males and 76 females. There were twenty-six houses in the townland, all of which were inhabited.

In 1851 the population of the townland was 122, being 64 males and 58 females, the reduction being due to the Great Famine (Ireland). There were twenty-two houses in the townland, two of which were uninhabited.

Griffith's Valuation of 1857 lists thirty eight landholders in the townland.

In 1861 the population of the townland was 118, being 54 males and 64 females. There were twenty-two houses in the townland, of which one was uninhabited.

In both the 1901 census of Ireland and the 1911 census of Ireland, there are twenty seven families listed in the townland.

== Antiquities ==
- Lime-kilns
- Stepping stones over the river
