= Tullywaum =

Townland in the civil parish of Templeport, County Cavan, Ireland

Tullywaum (from Irish Tulaigh Mháma, meaning 'The Hill of the Mountain Pass') is a townland in the civil parish of Templeport, County Cavan, Ireland. It lies in the Roman Catholic parish of Corlough and barony of Tullyhaw.

== Geography ==
Tullywaum is bounded on the south by Corrachomera, on the west by Owencam townland and on the east by Tullytrasna and Tullybrack townlands. Its chief geographical features are a mountain stream, forestry plantations, dug wells and a gravel pit. Tullywaum is traversed by minor public roads and rural lanes. The townland covers 178 statute acres. A sub-division of the townland is The Blast = A Windy Hill.

== History ==
In earlier times the townland was probably uninhabited as it consists mainly of bog and poor clay soils. It was not seized by the English during the Plantation of Ulster in 1610 or in the Cromwellian Settlement of the 1660s so some dispossessed Irish families moved there and began to clear and farm the land.

A lease dated 17 September 1816 John Enery of Bawnboy includes Tullywaam otherwise Tullywaim.

The Tithe Applotment Books for 1826 list sixteen tithepayers in the townland

The Tullywaum Valuation Office Field books are available for September 1839.

In 1841 the population of the townland was 73, being 37 males and 36 females. There were eleven houses in the townland, all were inhabited.

In 1851 the population of the townland was 50, being 20 males and 30 females, the reduction being due to the Great Famine (Ireland). There were eleven houses in the townland, of which two were uninhabited.

Griffith's Valuation of 1857 lists eleven landholders in the townland.

In 1861 the population of the townland was 63, being 27 males and 36 females. There were ten houses in the townland and all were inhabited.

In 1871 the population of the townland was 70, being 37 males and 33 females. There were eleven houses in the townland and all were inhabited.(page 296 of census)

In 1881 the population of the townland was 61, being 29 males and 32 females. There were eleven houses in the townland, all were inhabited.

In 1891 the population of the townland was 62, being 28 males and 34 females. There were twelve houses in the townland, all were inhabited.

In the 1901 census of Ireland, there are seventeen families listed in the townland.

In the 1911 census of Ireland, there are seventeen families listed in the townland.

== Antiquities ==
1. Stepping Stones over the stream
