= Altnadarragh =

Townland in the civil parish of Templeport, County Cavan, Ireland

Coordinates: 54°09′34″N 7°48′33″W

Altnadarragh (from Irish Alt na Darach, meaning 'The Height of the Oaktree') is a townland in the civil parish of Templeport, County Cavan, Ireland. It lies in the Roman Catholic parish of Corlough and barony of Tullyhaw.

== Geography ==
Altnadarragh is bounded on the west by Bellavally Upper townland, on the south by Altateskin townland and on the east by Altachullion Upper and Legnaderk townlands. Its chief geographical features are the Owensallagh river (A source of the River Blackwater, County Cavan), mountain streams, forestry plantations and a spring. Altnadarragh is traversed by minor roads and rural lanes. The townland covers 379 statute acres.

== History ==
In earlier times the townland was probably uninhabited as it consists mainly of bog and poor clay soils. It was not seized by the English during the Plantation of Ulster in 1610 or in the Cromwellian Settlement of the 1660s so some dispossessed Irish families moved there and began to clear and farm the land.

A lease dated 17 September 1816 John Enery of Bawnboy includes Altinedarragh.

The Tithe Applotment Books for 1826 list two tithepayers in the townland.

The Ordnance Survey Name Books for 1836 give the following description of the townland- It is bounded on the south by a large mountain stream in the bed of which there is plenty of limestone, but the inhabitants do not seem to put any value on it as they do not quarry nor use it in any shape.

The Altnadarragh Valuation Office Field books are available for August 1839.

In 1841 the population of the townland was 37, being 16 males and 21 females. There were five houses in the townland, all of which were inhabited.

In 1851 the population of the townland was 35, being 19 males and 16 females, the reduction being due to the Great Famine (Ireland). There were four houses in the townland and all were inhabited.

Griffith's Valuation of 1857 lists four landholders in the townland.

In 1861 the population of the townland was 37, being 21 males and 16 females. There were five houses in the townland and all were inhabited.

In 1871 the population of the townland was 28, being 13 males and 15 females. There were five houses in the townland, all were inhabited.

In 1881 the population of the townland was 33, being 14 males and 19 females. There were six houses in the townland, all were inhabited.

In 1891 the population of the townland was 39, being 24 males and 15 females. There were six houses in the townland, all were inhabited.

In the 1901 census of Ireland, there are eight families listed in the townland.

In the 1911 census of Ireland, there are seven families listed in the townland.

== Antiquities ==
The chief structures of historical interest in the townland are

1. A prehistoric cairn on the northern townland border with Legnaderk, marked on the Ordnance survey 6" map as Carn.
