= Legnaderk =

Townland in County Cavan, Ireland

Legnaderk (an anglicisation of the Gaelic, either ‘Lag na Deirce’, meaning The Hollow of the Cave or 'Lag na Dearg', meaning The Hollow of the Blood or 'Lag nÁtha Dheirg', meaning The Hollow of the Red Ford) is a townland in the civil parish of Templeport, County Cavan, Ireland. It lies in the Roman Catholic parish of Corlough and barony of Tullyhaw.

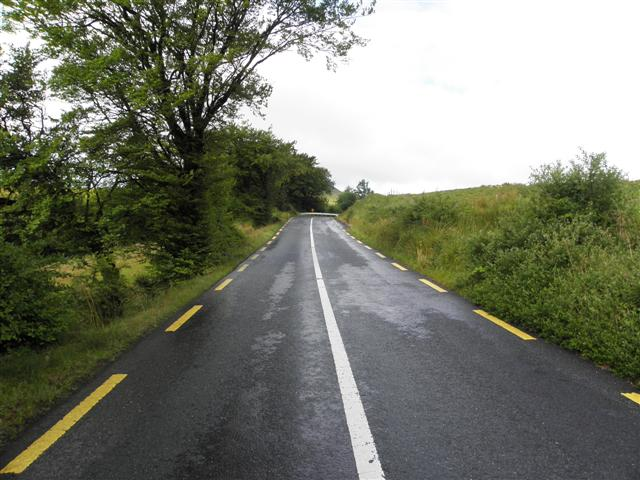
R200 at Legnaderk (geograph 3597120)

== Geography ==
Legnaderk is bounded on the north by Aghnacollia and Commas (Kinawley) townlands, on the west by Bellavally Upper townland, on the east by Altachullion Lower and Altachullion Upper townlands and on the south by Altnadarragh townland. It is part of the Cuilcagh mountain range and its chief geographical features are Benbeg Mountain (An Bhinn Bheag meaning ‘The Small Peak’), which reaches a height of 539 metres, mountain streams, waterfalls, forestry plantations and a spring well. The townland is traversed by the regional R200 road (Ireland), minor public roads and rural lanes. The townland covers 357 statute acres.

== History ==
The earliest surviving mention of the name relates to the Battle of Magh Slecht in 1256 which took place in Legnaderk between the O’Reilly and O’Rourke clans. The Annals of Loch Cé for that year state- Cath Mhoighe Slecht ar brú Atha Derg, ag Allt na hellti, ós Bhealaigh na beithighe, ainm in catha sin (The battle of Magh-Slecht, on the brink of Ath-derg, at Alt-na-helti, over Bealach-na-beithighe, is the name of this battle).

The Dúchas Folklore collection states- In Cromwell's time the Planters moved through these mountains which they attempted to cross. But the Irish attacked them and drove them back after a fierce battle which was fought in the townland now called Legnaderk - Lug-na-Dearg from the amount of blood spilled. Some say Maguire came to this battle and stayed over-night at 'Maguire's chair. However this may be a late tradition which confuses the battle with the earlier Battle of Magh Slecht in 1256.

In 1720 Morley Saunders was in possession. He leased his interest in Legnaderk to Colonel John Enery of Bawnboy by deed dated 24 December 1720.

A rental of the Annesley Estate dated c.1802 mentions a lease for 31 years of Legnaderk dated 1 May 1780 to Andrew Brady.

A map of the townland drawn in 1813 is in the National Archives of Ireland, Beresford Estate Maps, depicts the townland as Loughnadirk.

The Tithe Applotment Books for 1826 list two tithepayers in the townland.

The Ordnance Survey Name Books for 1836 give the following description of the townland- There is a large mountain stream runs through the townland from west to east. On the south side of the Glan road near the west end of the townland, a large stone marks the spot where a man perished in the snow and every person who passes adds a small stone to the carn of the departed.

The Legnaderk Valuation Office Field books are available for August 1839.

Griffith's Valuation of 1857 lists two landholders in the townland.

In the 19th century the landlord of Legnaderk was the Annesley Estate.

== Census ==
| Year | Population | Males | Females | Total Houses | Uninhabited |
|---|---|---|---|---|---|
| 1841 | 9 | 6 | 3 | 1 | 0 |
| 1851 | 14 | 10 | 4 | 2 | 0 |
| 1861 | 9 | 3 | 6 | 1 | 0 |
| 1871 | 16 | 5 | 11 | 2 | 0 |
| 1881 | 17 | 6 | 11 | 3 | 1 |
| 1891 | 17 | 6 | 11 | 2 | 0 |

In the 1901 census of Ireland, there are four families listed in the townland.

In the 1911 census of Ireland, there are two families listed in the townland.

== Antiquities ==
1. Glan Lodge. The website www.glangevlin.com states- In Glan the Annesley family was represented by a bailiff who lived in the Glan Lodge in Legnaderk. Perhaps the best known of these was Thomas Whiteside who was bailiff in the 1880s and who has been immortalised in ballad.
2. Sheepfolds
3. Stone bridges over the river.
