= Tullyloughfin =

Townland in County Cavan, Ireland

Tullyloughfin (from Irish Tulaigh Log Fionn, meaning 'The Hill of the White Hollows') is a townland in the civil parish of Templeport, County Cavan, Ireland. It lies in the Roman Catholic parish of Corlough and barony of Tullyhaw.

== Geography ==
Tullyloughfin is bounded on the north by Altachullion Upper townland, on the west by Altateskin, Owencam and Tullybrack townlands and on the east by Eaglehill, Tullandreen and Tullynamoltra townlands. Its chief geographical features are the Owensallagh river (A source of the River Blackwater, County Cavan), forestry plantations, gravel pits and dug wells. Tullyloughfin is traversed by minor public roads and rural lanes. The townland covers 222 statute acres.

== History ==
In earlier times the townland was probably uninhabited as it consists mainly of bog and poor clay soils. It was not seized by the English during the Plantation of Ulster in 1610 or in the Cromwellian Settlement of the 1660s so some dispossessed Irish families moved there and began to clear and farm the land.

A deed dated 13 Nov 1738 includes: Tullyanlaugh.

A deed dated 30 April 1740 by Thomas Enery includes: Tullinlough.

A map of the townland drawn in 1813 is in the National Archives of Ireland, Beresford Estate Maps, depicts the townland as Tullinloughfin.

The Tithe Applotment Books for 1827 list four tithepayers in the townland.

The Ordnance Survey Name Books for 1836 give the following description of the townland- Contains 224 acres of which 43 are cultivated and 181 of uncultivated heathy mountain pasture...The townland is bounded on the east and south sides by a large mountain stream, near the west bank of which the principal part of the tenants reside.

The Tullyloughfin Valuation Office Field books are available for August 1839.

In 1841 the population of the townland was 55, being 23 males and 32 females. There were eight houses in the townland, all were inhabited.

In 1851 the population of the townland was 65, being 32 males and 33 females. There were nine houses in the townland, all inhabited.

Griffith's Valuation of 1857 lists nineteen landholders in the townland.

In 1861 the population of the townland was 63, being 32 males and 31 females. There were eleven houses in the townland and all were inhabited.

In 1871 the population of the townland was 61, being 30 males and 31 females. There were twelve houses in the townland and all were inhabited.(page 296 of census)

In 1881 the population of the townland was 61, being 28 males and 33 females. There were thirteen houses in the townland, all were inhabited.

In 1891 the population of the townland was 63, being 33 males and 30 females. There were twelve houses in the townland, all were inhabited.

In the 1901 census of Ireland, there are thirteen families listed in the townland.

In the 1911 census of Ireland, there are twelve families listed in the townland.

== Antiquities ==
1. A foot-bridge over the stream
