= Muineal =

Townland in the civil parish of Templeport, County Cavan, Ireland

Muineal (from Irish Muinéal meaning A Neck of Land) is a townland in the civil parish of Templeport, County Cavan, Ireland. It lies in the Roman Catholic parish of Corlough and barony of Tullyhaw.

== Geography ==
Muineal is bounded on the north by Derryconnessy and Tonlegee townlands, on the south by Teeboy townland, on the west by Corratillan and Knockmore, County Cavan townlands and on the east by Arderry townland. Its chief geographical features are the River Blackwater, County Cavan, a small stream, forestry plantations, spring wells and dug wells. Muineal is traversed by the R202 road (Ireland) and rural lanes. The crossroads is known as Devine’s Cross. The townland covers 104 statute acres.

== History ==
In medieval times the McGovern barony of Tullyhaw was divided into economic taxation areas called ballibetoes, from the Irish Baile Biataigh (Anglicized as 'Ballybetagh'), meaning 'A Provisioner's Town or Settlement'. The original purpose was to enable the farmer, who controlled the baile, to provide hospitality for those who needed it, such as poor people and travellers. The ballybetagh was further divided into townlands farmed by individual families who paid a tribute or tax to the head of the ballybetagh, who in turn paid a similar tribute to the clan chief. The steward of the ballybetagh would have been the secular equivalent of the erenagh in charge of church lands. There were seven ballibetoes in the parish of Templeport. Muineal was located in the ballybetagh of Ballymackgonghan (Irish = Baile Mac Eochagain, meaning 'McEoghan's Town').

In earlier times the townland was probably uninhabited as it consists mainly of bog and poor clay soils. It was not seized by the English during the Plantation of Ulster in 1610 or in the Cromwellian Settlement of the 1660s so some dispossessed Irish families moved there and began to clear and farm the land.

A lease dated 17 September 1816 John Enery of Bawnboy includes Muninial otherwise Munial.

The Tithe Applotment Books for 1827 list thirteen tithepayers in the townland.

The Muineal Valuation Office Field books are available for October 1839.

In 1841 the population of the townland was 58, being 30 males and 28 females. There were eight houses in the townland, all were inhabited.

In 1851 the population of the townland was 38, being 23 males and 15 females, the reduction being due to the Great Famine (Ireland). There were five houses in the townland, all inhabited.

Griffith's Valuation of 1857 lists five landholders in the townland.

In 1861 the population of the townland was 31, being 19 males and 12 females. There were five houses in the townland and all were inhabited.

In 1871 the population of the townland was 21, being 10 males and 11 females. There were four houses in the townland and all were inhabited. (page 296 of census)

In 1881 the population of the townland was 29, being 15 males and 14 females. There were six houses in the townland, all were inhabited.

In 1891 the population of the townland was 33, being 14 males and 19 females. There were five houses in the townland, all were inhabited.

In the 1901 census of Ireland, there are five families listed in the townland, and in the 1911 census of Ireland, there are five families listed in the townland.

== Antiquities ==
There are no known antiquities in the townland.
