= Altachullion Upper =

Townland in the civil parish of Templeport, County Cavan, Ireland

Coordinates: 54.1546°N 7.7800°W

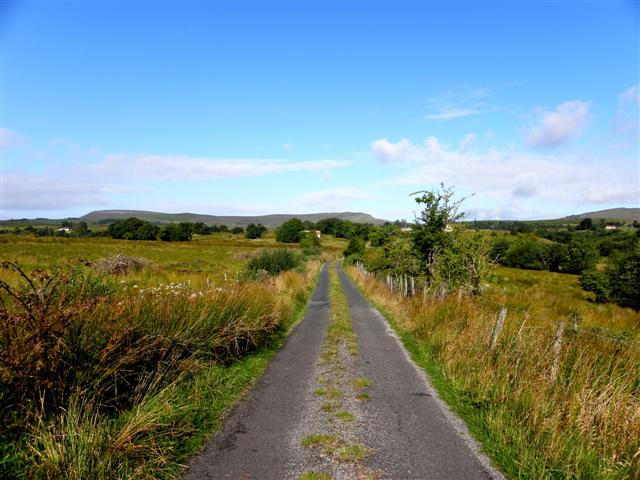
Road at Altachullion Upper townland. Heading WNW

Altachullion Upper (from Irish Alt an Chuilinn Uachtarach, meaning 'The Upper Glen of the Holly') is a townland in the civil parish of Templeport, County Cavan, Ireland. It lies in the Roman Catholic parish of Corlough and barony of Tullyhaw. A sub-division is called The Tebente - a name given to a field which in 1938 was the property of Mrs McGoldrick.

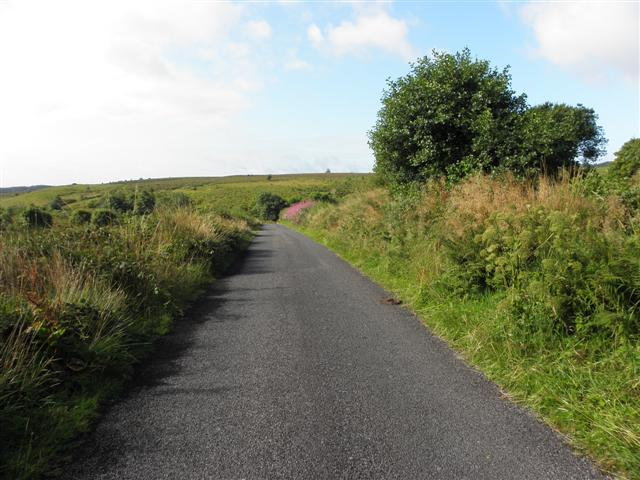
Road heading south-southwest from Altachullion Upper into Altateskin townland.

== Geography ==
Altachullion Upper is bounded on the north by Altachullion Lower townland, on the south by Altateskin townland, on the west by Legnaderk and Altnadarragh townlands and on the east by Altinure, Tullyloughfin and Tullynamoltra townlands. Its chief geographical features are mountain streams, gravel pits, springs and dug wells. Altachullion Upper is traversed by minor public roads and rural lanes. The townland covers 271 statute acres,.

== History ==
In earlier times the townland was probably uninhabited as it consists mainly of bog and poor clay soils. It was not seized by the English during the Plantation of Ulster in 1610, nor in the Cromwellian Settlement of the 1660s; so some dispossessed Irish families moved there and began to clear and farm the land.

The earliest reference to the townland is on a map dated 1813 where it is called "Altaghullen".

In the 19th century the landlord was Lord John Beresford, the Protestant Archbishop of Armagh. The muddled previous land history of the area is described in the 1838 Exchequer case, "Attorney General of Ireland v The Lord Primate". The maps used in the case are viewable online at Tullyhaw.

The Tithe Applotment Books for 1826 list twelve tithepayers in the townland.

The Ordnance Survey Name Books for 1836 give the following description of the townland: It is bounded on the north side by a large stream which rises in the mountain and runs towards the southeast. ...a flax kiln.

The Altachullion Upper Valuation Office Field books are available for August 1839.

Griffith's Valuation of 1857 lists seven landholders in the townland.

Decennial census figures for the townland
Year	Population			No. of houses (all inhabited)	Ref.
Year	M	F	Total	No. of houses (all inhabited)	Ref.
1841	28	20	48	9	
1851	30	20	50	5	
1861	18	14	32	6	
1871	27	26	53	8	
1881	13	20	33	7	
1891	17	23	40	7	
1901	7 families				
1911	7 families				

== Antiquities ==
The only structure of historical interest in the townland is

1. A footbridge over the stream
