= Tullytrasna =

Townland in the civil parish of Templeport, County Cavan, Ireland

Tullytrasna (from Irish Tulaigh Thrasna, meaning 'The Cross Hill') is a townland in the civil parish of Templeport, County Cavan, Ireland. It lies in the Roman Catholic parish of Corlough and barony of Tullyhaw.

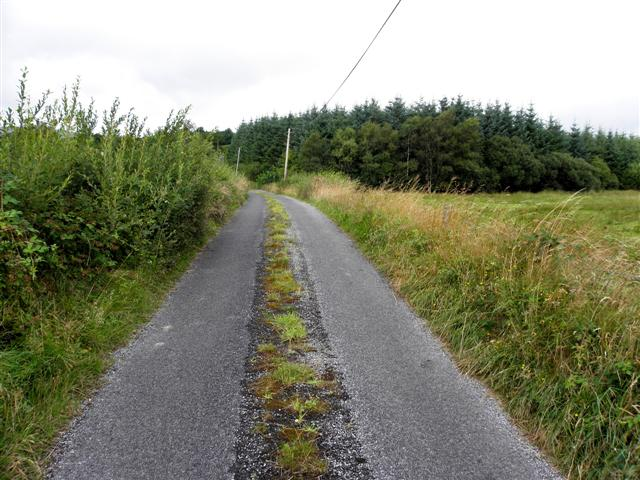
Tullytrasna townland, Corlough parish, County Cavan, Ireland. Heading north-west to Tullywaum townland

== Geography ==
Tullytrasna is bounded on the north by Tullybrack townland, on the south by Corlough townland, on the west by Corrachomera and Tullywaum townlands and on the east by Corracholia More and Knockmore, County Cavan townlands. Its chief geographical features a mountain stream, forestry plantations and spring wells. Tullytrasna is traversed by minor public roads and rural lanes. The townland covers 126 statute acres.

== History ==
In earlier times the townland was probably uninhabited as it consists mainly of bog and poor clay soils. It was not seized by the English during the Plantation of Ulster in 1610 or in the Cromwellian Settlement of the 1660s so some dispossessed Irish families moved there and began to clear and farm the land. Before the Ordnance Survey it comprised three different townlands Tullytrasna, Cornamucklagh (Irish Corr na Muclach, meaning ‘The Round Hill of the Piggeries’), alias Cornamuck (Irish Corr na Muc, meaning ‘The Round Hill of the Pigs’) and Tullyteskin, alias Tullyteskill. The townlands were then merged in the Survey.

A deed by Thomas Enery dated 29 Jan 1735 includes the lands of Cornamuck.

Deeds dated 10 December 1774 and 13 December 1774 by John Enery of Bawnboy includes: Cornamuck.

A lease dated 17 September 1816 John Enery of Bawnboy includes Tullyteskin, otherwise Tullyteskill, Tullytrasna and Cornamuck.

The Tithe Applotment Books for 1826 list sixteen tithepayers in the townland.

The Ordnance Survey Name Books for 1836 give the following description of the townland- The townland is bounded by a large mountain stream on the south side.

The Tullytrasna Valuation Office Field books are available for September 1839.

In 1841 the population of the townland was 69, being 32 males and 37 females. There were thirteen houses in the townland, all were inhabited.

In 1851 the population of the townland was 48, being 26 males and 22 females, the reduction being due to the Great Famine (Ireland). There were eight houses in the townland, all inhabited.

Griffith's Valuation of 1857 lists fourteen landholders in the townland.

In 1861 the population of the townland was 49, being 23 males and 26 females. There were seven houses in the townland and all were inhabited.

In 1871 the population of the townland was 54, being 27 males and 27 females. There were nine houses in the townland and all were inhabited.(page 296 of census)

In 1881 the population of the townland was 51, being 25 males and 26 females. There were eleven houses in the townland, all were inhabited.

In 1891 the population of the townland was 42, being 21 males and 21 females. There were ten houses in the townland, one of which was uninhabited.

In the 1901 census of Ireland, there are fourteen families listed in the townland.

In the 1911 census of Ireland, there are eleven families listed in the townland.

== Antiquities ==
1. The site of Corlough Dispensary
2. Stepping stones over the river
