= Altateskin =

Townland in the civil parish of Templeport, County Cavan, Ireland

Coordinates: 54.1511°N 7.7842°W

Altateskin (from Irish Alt an tSeiscinn, meaning 'The Glen of the Marsh') is a townland in the civil parish of Templeport, County Cavan, Ireland. It lies in the Roman Catholic parish of Corlough and barony of Tullyhaw. The local pronunciation is Awelta a chaskin.

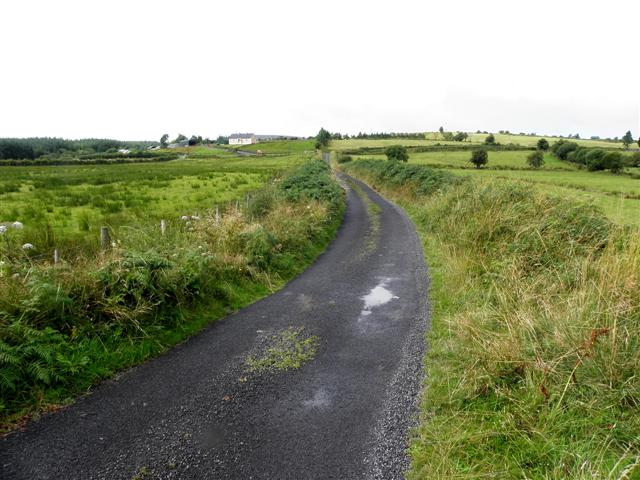
Road at Altateskin townland. Heading north to Altachullion townland

== Geography ==
Altateskin is bounded on the west by Altcrock, Bellavally Upper, Derrynananta Lower and Altnadarragh townlands and on the east by Altachullion Upper, Tullyloughfin and Owencam townlands. Its chief geographical features are the Owensallagh river (A source of the River Blackwater, County Cavan), Mullaghroe mountain, waterfalls, swallow holes, gravel pits, a sulphur spa well, and springs. Altateskin is traversed by minor public roads and rural lanes. The townland covers 533 statute acres,.

== History ==
In earlier times the townland was probably uninhabited as it consists mainly of bog and poor clay soils. It was not seized by the English during the Plantation of Ulster in 1610 or in the Cromwellian Settlement of the 1660s so some dispossessed Irish families moved there and began to clear and farm the land.

The earliest reference to the townland is on a map dated 1813 where it is called Altaghteskin and Altaghteskan with the owner being John Ennery esquire.

A lease dated 17 September 1816 John Enery of Bawnboy includes Altnaskeen otherwise Alteteskill.

In the 19th century the landlord was Lord John Beresford, the Protestant Archbishop of Armagh. The muddled land history of the area prior to this is described in the 1838 Exchequer case, "Attorney General of Ireland v The Lord Primate". The maps used in the case are viewable online at- Search Results - tullyhaw

The Tithe Applotment Books for 1826 list four tithepayers in the townland.

The Ordnance Survey Name Books for 1836 give the following description of the townland- a flax kiln on the banks of a large stream. There is likewise a spa well above this spot. The townland is bounded on the north and south sides by two large mountain streams which unite at its eastern extremity and run towards the southeast.

The Altateskin Valuation Office Field books are available for August 1839.

In 1841 the population of the townland was 54, being 29 males and 25 females. There were eleven houses in the townland, all of which were inhabited.

In 1851 the population of the townland was 50, being 25 males and 25 females, the reduction being due to the Great Famine (Ireland). There were eight houses in the townland and all were inhabited.

Griffith's Valuation of 1857 lists seven landholders in the townland.

In 1861 the population of the townland was 55, being 29 males and 26 females. There were eight houses in the townland and all were inhabited.

In 1871 the population of the townland was 46, being 25 males and 21 females. There were eight houses in the townland, all were inhabited.

In 1881 the population of the townland was 48, being 25 males and 23 females. There were ten houses in the townland, all were inhabited.

In 1891 the population of the townland was 46, being 25 males and 21 females. There were nine houses in the townland, all were inhabited.

In the 1901 census of Ireland, there are eleven families listed in the townland.

In the 1911 census of Ireland, there are nine families listed in the townland.

== Antiquities ==
The chief structures of historical interest in the townland are

1. Stepping stones over the streams
