= Leitra, Corlough =

Townland in County Cavan, Ireland

Leitra (from Irish Leitreach, meaning 'The Wet Hillside') is a townland in the civil parish of Templeport, County Cavan, Ireland. It lies in the Roman Catholic parish of Corlough and barony of Tullyhaw.

== Geography ==
Leitra is bounded on the north by Corlough townland, on the west by Corrachomera townland, on the south by Cartronnagilta townland and on the east by Cornacleigh townland. Its chief geographical features are the River Blackwater, County Cavan, mountain streams and spring wells. Leitra is traversed by minor public roads and rural lanes. The townland covers 83 statute acres.

== History ==
In earlier times the townland was probably uninhabited as it consists mainly of bog and poor clay soils. It was not seized by the English during the Plantation of Ulster in 1610 or in the Cromwellian Settlement of the 1660s so some dispossessed Irish families moved there and began to clear and farm the land.

Lowther Kirkwood of Mullinagrave, parish of Templeport, Co. Cavan, gentleman made the following will:

2 July 1804. To his grandnephew Lowther Brien, city of Dublin, attorney, and his heirs his lands of Awengallis, Ballylenan, Ballymagirill, Stranadarragh, Carnagimlie, Cullagh, Drumleden, Leitry, Corlagh, Lananleragh [Lannanerriagh], Gowlanlea and Drumlogher, Co. Cavan, held under lease from the Beresford family. He had begun a suit in Chancery, Ireland, against John Brien, late of Salvon, Co. Fermanagh, deceased, for setting aside a fraudulent deed obtained by said John Brien, which suit against the representatives is to be continued by said Lowther Brien, his sole exor. Witnesses: John Johnston and Andrew Rutledge, both of Ballymagiril, and Thos. Stephenson, Drumleaden, Co. Cavan, gent. Memorial witnessed by: said Andrew Rutledge, and John Balfour, city of Dublin, attorney.

A map of the townland drawn in 1813 is in the National Archives of Ireland, Beresford Estate Maps, depicts the townland as Letera and the owner as The Lord Primate, the lessee as Mr. Kirkwood and the tenant as Patrick Grace.

The Tithe Applotment Books for 1826 list eleven tithepayers in the townland.

The Leitra Valuation Office Field books are available for September 1839.

In 1841 the population of the townland was 64 being 34 males and 30 females. There were eight houses in the townland of which one was uninhabited.

In 1851 the population of the townland was 45 being 26 males and 19 females, the reduction being due to the Great Famine (Ireland). There were six houses in the townland and all were inhabited.

Griffith's Valuation of 1857 lists six landholders in the townland.

In 1861 the population of the townland was 27, being 16 males and 11 females. There were five houses in the townland and all were inhabited.

In 1871 the population of the townland was 38, being 19 males and 19 females. There were seven houses in the townland and all were inhabited. (page 296 of census)

In 1881 the population of the townland was 36, being 24 males and 12 females. There were six houses in the townland, all were inhabited.

In 1891 the population of the townland was 38, being 23 males and 15 females. There were six houses in the townland, all were inhabited.

In the 1901 census of Ireland, there are six families listed in the townland.

In the 1911 census of Ireland, there are six families listed in the townland.

== Antiquities ==
1. The site of a 19th century hedge-school. The 1930s Dúchas folklore collection states- In Leitra a school was held in a sheltered place behind a ditch. The ditch served as a back wall, and a mud wall was built on each side of that, but then a man who lived near the place gave the teacher an old barn built of mud, and he and his pupils studied there for years.
2. Stepping stones over the river
