= Gowlan =

Townland in Templeport, Ireland

Coordinates: 54°15′N 7°54′W

Gowlan (from Irish Gabhlán, meaning 'little fork between two streams') is a townland in the civil parish of Templeport and the electoral division of Benbrack in County Cavan, Ireland. It lies in the Catholic parish of Corlough and barony of Tullyhaw.

== Geography ==
Gowlan is bounded on the west by Tullyveela, Derrynananta Upper and Derrynananta Lower townlands and on the east by Altcrock, Owencam and Tullynaconspod townlands. Its chief geographical features are Derrynananta Lough, forestry plantations, waterfalls, gravel pits and mountain streams. Gowlan is traversed by minor public roads and rural lanes. The townland covers 926 statute acres.

== History ==
In earlier times, the townland was largely uninhabited and mainly consisted of bog and poor clay soils. It was not seized by the English during the Plantation of Ulster in 1610 or in the Cromwellian Settlement of the 1660s so some dispossessed Irish families moved there and began to clear and farm the land.

Lowther Kirkwood, a "gentleman" of Mullinagrave, parish of Templeport, County Cavan, made the following will:

"2 July 1804. To his grandnephew Lowther Brien, city of Dublin, attorney, and his heirs his lands of Awengallis, Ballylenan, Ballymagirill, Stranadarragh, Carnagimlie, Cullagh, Drumleden, Leitry, Corlagh, Lananleragh, Gowlanlea and Drumlogher, Co. Cavan, held under lease from the Beresford family. He had begun a suit in Chancery, Ireland, against John Brien, late of Salvon, Co. Fermanagh, deceased, for setting aside a fraudulent deed obtained by said John Brien, which suit against the representatives is to be continued by said Lowther Brien, his sole exor. Witnesses: John Johnston and Andrew Rutledge, both of Ballymagiril, and Thos. Stephenson, Drumleaden, Co. Cavan, gent. Memorial witnessed by: said Andrew Rutledge, and John Balfour, city of Dublin, attorney."

The Tithe Applotment Books for 1826 list five tithepayers in the townland.

The 1836 Ordnance Survey Namebooks state:

"There is a large mountain stream through the centre of the townland. It generally overflows its banks in winter and floods the low parts of the townland during the winter months. The soil is consequently cold and light, yielding poor crops of oats & potatoes. There is no county cess levied, as the townland is considered as mountain."

The Gowlan Valuation Office Field books are available for August 1839.

In 1841, the population of the townland was 13, being 8 males and 5 females. There were two houses in the townland, both of which were inhabited.

In 1851, the population of the townland was 9, being 7 males and 2 females, the reduction being due to the Great Famine (Ireland). There were two houses in the townland, one of which was uninhabited.

Griffith's Valuation of 1857 lists four landholders in the townland.

In 1861, the population of the townland was 20, being 8 males and 12 females. There were four houses in the townland and all were inhabited.

In 1871, the population of the townland was 33, being 15 males and 18 females. There were four houses in the townland, and all were inhabited.

In 1881, the population of the townland was 33, being 15 males and 18 females. There were four houses in the townland, all were inhabited.

In 1891, the population of the townland was 22, being 9 males and 13 females. There were four houses in the townland, all were inhabited.

In the 1901 census of Ireland, there are five families listed in the townland.

In the 1911 census of Ireland, there are five families listed in the townland.

== Antiquities ==
Antiquities recorded in the townland include a prehistoric cairn on the northern townland border with Altcrock. It is marked on the Ordnance survey 25" map as a "pile of stones", reused as a boundary marker during the introduction of townland divisions, or it may be contemporaneous with this development. (It is marked as site number 120 in the Archaeological Inventory of County Cavan by Patrick O'Donovan, 1995)

Other features include a ford and stepping stones over a stream.
