= Cornacleigh =

Townland in the civil parish of Templeport, County Cavan, Ireland

Cornacleigh (from Irish Corr na Cloiche, meaning 'The Hill of the Stone') is a townland in the civil parish of Templeport, and barony of Tullyhaw, County Cavan, Ireland. The local pronunciation is Curnacloyche.

== Geography ==
Cornacleigh is bounded on the north by Corlough townland, on the west by Leitra, Corlough townland, on the south by Cartronnagilta and Cronery townlands and on the east by Corratillan and Knockmore, County Cavan townlands. Its chief geographical features are the River Blackwater, County Cavan, a stream, forestry plantations and spring wells. Cornacleigh is traversed by minor public roads and rural lanes. The townland covers 108 statute acres.

== History ==
In earlier times the townland was probably uninhabited as it consists mainly of bog and poor clay soils. It was not seized by the English during the Plantation of Ulster in 1610 or in the Cromwellian Settlement of the 1660s so some dispossessed Irish families moved there and began to clear and farm the land.

A lease dated 17 September 1816 John Enery of Bawnboy includes Carnacliff otherwise Carnacligh.

The landlord of Cornacleigh in the mid-19th century was John Finlay.

Records of inhabitation include:

- The Tithe Applotment Books for 1826 list nine tithepayers in the townland.
- The Cornacleigh Valuation Office Field books are available for September 1839.
- In 1841 the population of the townland was 60, being 29 males and 31 females. There were nine houses in the townland, all of which were inhabited.
- In 1851 the population of the townland was 47, being 22 males and 25 females, the reduction being due to the Great Famine (Ireland). There were seven houses in the townland, all inhabited.
- Griffith's Valuation of 1857 lists nine landholders in the townland.
- In 1861 the population of the townland was 37, being 20 males and 17 females. There were five houses in the townland, of which two were uninhabited.
- In 1871 the population of the townland was 18, being 9 males and 9 females. There were four houses in the townland, all were inhabited.
- In 1881 the population of the townland was 29, being 14 males and 15 females. There were five houses in the townland, all were inhabited.
- In 1891 the population of the townland was 35, being 17 males and 18 females. There were six houses in the townland, all were inhabited.
- In the 1901 census of Ireland, there are six families listed in the townland.
- In the 1911 census of Ireland, there are nine families listed in the townland.

== Religion ==
Cornacleigh lies in the Roman Catholic parish of Corlough.

== Cornacleigh National School ==
The roll number was 8713. In 1862 Michael McAuley, a Roman Catholic, was the headmaster. There were 88 pupils, all Roman Catholic. The Catechism was taught to the Catholic pupils on Tuesdays and Thursdays from 3pm to 3:30pm and on Saturdays from 10am to 12 noon.

1874: It was changed to an Ordinary Agricultural School which meant a national school with a small farm attached. One male teacher who received an annual salary of £37. There were 82 pupils, 33 boys and 49 girls.
