= Owencam =

Place in County Cavan, Ireland

Owencam (from Irish Abhainn Cham, meaning 'The Crooked River') is a townland in the civil parish of Templeport, County Cavan, Ireland. It lies in the Roman Catholic parish of Corlough and barony of Tullyhaw.

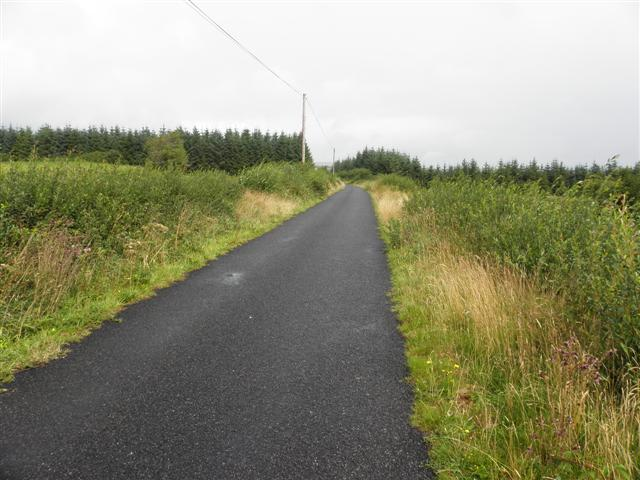
Owencam townland, Corlough parish, County Cavan, Ireland. Heading NNE towards Altachullion Upper townland

== Geography ==
Owencam is bounded on the north by Altateskin, Altcrock and Tullyloughfin townlands, on the west by Gowlan and Tullynaconspod townlands, on the south by Corrachomera townland and on the east by Tullybrack townland. Its chief geographical features are the River Blackwater, County Cavan, the Owensallagh river (A source of the River Blackwater, County Cavan), forestry plantations, dug wells and gravel pits. Owencam is traversed by minor public roads and rural lanes. The townland covers 316 statute acres. The sub-divisions of the townland are Cahran (Caothran = The Rowan Tree); Black Park; Pulbraddagh (Poll Braddach = Dangerous Quagmire).

== History ==
In earlier times the townland was probably uninhabited as it consists mainly of bog and poor clay soils. It was not seized by the English during the Plantation of Ulster in 1610 or in the Cromwellian Settlement of the 1660s so some dispossessed Irish families moved there and began to clear and farm the land.

A lease dated 17 September 1816 John Enery of Bawnboy includes Owemcam.

The Tithe Applotment Books for 1826 list eight tithepayers in the townland

The Ordnance Survey Name Books for 1836 give the following description of the townland- There is a large mountain stream runs through the centre of the townland, on the north bank of which there are several good houses. Limestone can be procured in the bed of the large stream.

The Owencam Valuation Office Field books are available for September 1839.

In 1841 the population of the townland was 101, being 51 males and 50 females. There were fourteen houses in the townland, all were inhabited.

In 1851 the population of the townland was 83, being 37 males and 46 females, the reduction being due to the Great Famine (Ireland). There were fourteen houses in the townland, all inhabited.

Griffith's Valuation of 1857 lists sixteen landholders in the townland.

In 1861 the population of the townland was 86, being 40 males and 46 females. There were seventeen houses in the townland and all were inhabited apart from one in the course of erection.

In 1871 the population of the townland was 81, being 35 males and 46 females. There were eighteen houses in the townland, one of which was uninhabited.(page 296 of census)

In 1881 the population of the townland was 89, being 41 males and 48 females. There were seventeen houses in the townland, all were inhabited.

In 1891 the population of the townland was 81, being 42 males and 39 females. There were sixteen houses in the townland, all were inhabited.

In the 1901 census of Ireland, there are eighteen families listed in the townland.

In the 1911 census of Ireland, there are twenty families listed in the townland.

== Antiquities ==
1. A foot-bridge over the river
2. Stepping Stones over the river
3. A ford over the river
4. A lime-kiln
