= Greaghnadoony =

Townland in County Cavan, Ireland

Greaghnadoony (from Irish Greach na Dúine, meaning 'The Bog of the Fort') is a townland in the civil parish of Templeport, County Cavan, Ireland. It lies in the Roman Catholic parish of Corlough and barony of Tullyhaw.

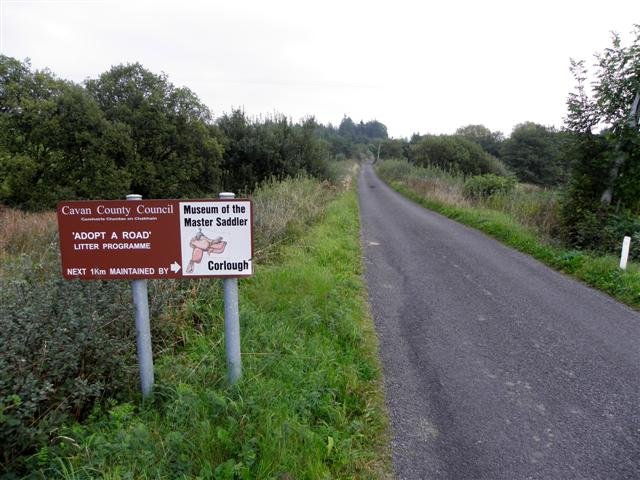
Road at Greaghnadoony (geograph 3679417)

== Geography ==
Greaghnadoony is bounded on the west by Greaghnaloughry and Corraleehan townlands, both in County Leitrim, and on the east by Tullyveela, Cartronnagilta and Corrachomera townlands. Its chief geographical features are mountain streams and a spring well. Greaghnadoony is traversed by minor public roads and rural lanes. The townland covers 88 statute acres.

== History ==
In earlier times the townland was probably uninhabited as it consists mainly of bog and poor clay soils. It was not seized by the English during the Plantation of Ulster in 1610 or in the Cromwellian Settlement of the 1660s so some dispossessed Irish families moved there and began to clear and farm the land.

A map of the townland drawn in 1813 is in the National Archives of Ireland, Beresford Estate Maps, depicts the townland as Greagnadown and Greagnadowny with the proprietors being John Finlay and Colonel Ennery deceased.Search Results - tullyhaw

The Tithe Applotment Books for 1826 list thirteen tithepayers in the townland.

The Greaghnadoony Valuation Office Field books are available for September 1839.

In 1841 the population of the townland was 59 being 28 males and 31 females. There were ten houses in the townland of which one was uninhabited.

In 1851 the population of the townland was 40 being 17 males and 23 females, the reduction being due to the Great Famine (Ireland). There were six houses in the townland and all were inhabited.

Griffith's Valuation of 1857 lists seven landholders in the townland.

In 1861 the population of the townland was 18, being 10 males and 8 females. There were four houses in the townland, of which one was uninhabited.

In 1871 the population of the townland was 19, being 10 males and 9 females. There were three houses in the townland, all were inhabited.

In 1881 the population of the townland was 23, being 13 males and 10 females. There were four houses in the townland, all were inhabited.

In 1891 the population of the townland was 29, being 15 males and 14 females. There were five houses in the townland, all were inhabited.

In the 1901 census of Ireland, there are six families listed in the townland.

In the 1911 census of Ireland, there are nine families listed in the townland.

== Antiquities ==
1. Closed National School.
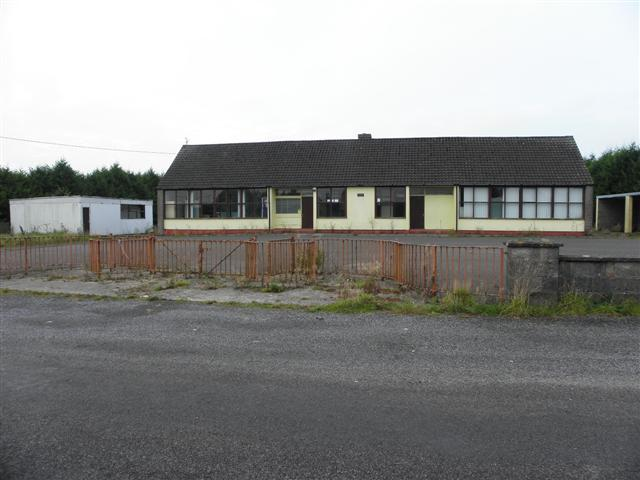
  School at Greaghnadoony (geograph 3679423)
