= Tullyveela =

Townland in the civil parish of Templeport, County Cavan, Ireland

Tullyveela (from Irish Tulaigh an Mhíle, meaning 'The Mile Hill') is a townland in the civil parish of Templeport, County Cavan, Ireland. It lies in the Roman Catholic parish of Corlough and barony of Tullyhaw. The local pronunciation is Tullyveela.

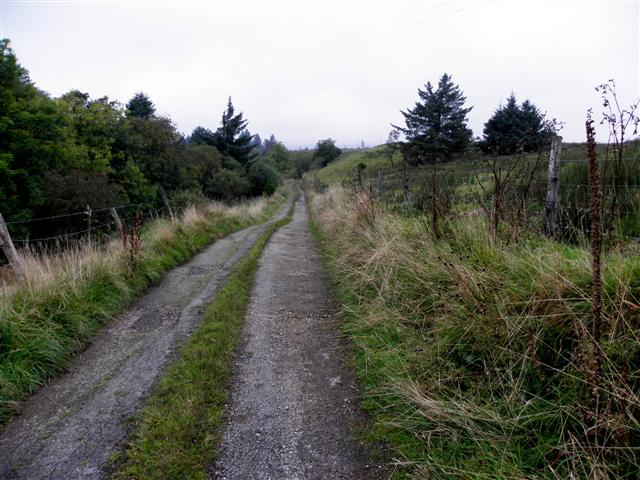
Tullyveela townland, Corlough parish, County Cavan, Ireland. Heading north-west

== Geography ==
Tullyveela is bounded on the west by Derrynananta Lower, Derrynananta Upper, Gowlan and Lannanerriagh townlands and on the east by Corrachomera, Greaghnadoony, Greaghnaloughry and Tullynaconspod townlands. Its chief geographical features are Derrynananta Lough, mountain streams, a waterfall, forestry plantations, a quarry, gravel pits, dug wells and spring wells. Tullyveela is traversed by minor public roads and rural lanes. The townland covers 505 statute acres.

== History ==
In earlier times the townland was probably uninhabited as it consists mainly of bog and poor clay soils. It was not seized by the English during the Plantation of Ulster in 1610 or in the Cromwellian Settlement of the 1660s so some dispossessed Irish families moved there and began to clear and farm the land.

The 1930s Dúchas Folklore collection states- A battle was fought in Crocán na gCamps, Derryconnessy, Corlough. Co. Cavan. It is supposed to have been fought between the Gael and Danes. When the cavalry were coming to Crocán na gCamps they had a row and fought a battle. The fought in Tullyvella and Conspud. It is not known which side won the battle, but they are still supposed to fight, at certain times of the year at night, and it is thought to be a bad sign of disturbance when dead people come back to fight. About 100-200 years ago battles were fought in the Townlands of Tullyvella and Conspud between the dead people who fought at the battle of Crocán na gCamps. In the morning after these battles were fought, the heather would be red with blood. One night there was a fight in Conspud and a man heard a voice calling him by his Christian name, that a neighbour's house was on fire. He looked out and saw the neighbour's house on fire, but he did not go to it. Next day the house was not burned, but was as if nothing happened.

A map of the townland drawn in 1813 is in the National Archives of Ireland, Beresford Estate Maps, depicts the townland as Tullyvelagh and the owner as John Finlay.

The Tithe Applotment Books for 1826 list twenty-one tithepayers in the townland.

The Ordnance Survey Name Books for 1836 give the following description of the townland- The soil is light and produces bad crops of oats, potatoes etc. It pays no county cess nor tithe, being considered a track of mountain...It is bounded on the north-east & south-west sides by two large streams which rise in the mountain and run south-east.

The Tullyveela Valuation Office Field books are available for September 1839.

In 1841 the population of the townland was 110, being 54 males and 56 females. There were twenty houses in the townland, all were inhabited.

In 1851 the population of the townland was 93, being 43 males and 50 females, the reduction being due to the Great Famine (Ireland). There were sixteen houses in the townland, all inhabited.

Griffith's Valuation of 1857 lists forty-five landholders in the townland.

In 1861 the population of the townland was 102, being 48 males and 54 females. There were eighteen houses in the townland, one of which was uninhabited.

In 1871 the population of the townland was 109, being 58 males and 51 females. There were twenty houses in the townland, one of which was uninhabited.(page 296 of census)

In 1881 the population of the townland was 97, being 46 males and 51 females. There were seventeen houses in the townland, all were inhabited.

In 1891 the population of the townland was 97, being 44 males and 53 females. There were nineteen houses in the townland, all were inhabited.

In the 1901 census of Ireland, there are twenty-one families listed in the townland.

In the 1911 census of Ireland, there are twenty-one families listed in the townland.

Local folklore from Tullyveela in the 1930s can be seen at

== Antiquities ==
1. Tullyveela School. There was a hedge-school there from the early part of the 19th century. The headmaster then was Peter Maguire, who taught Latin, Greek, English and Arithmetic. The school had no seats or desks. The 21st Report from the Education Commissioners on 31 December 1854 states that Tullyveela Roman Catholic School, Roll No. 6998, had one male teacher who had an annual salary of £9.3s.4d. The school had 97 pupils enrolled, 58 boys and 39 girls, but the average daily attendance was only 66 pupils in 1854. Griffiths Valuation of 1857 lists the Lessor of the Schoolhouse as Patrick Lilly. The 1862 Report states that Constantine Dolan was the headmaster and his assistant was Michael Maguire, both Roman Catholics. There were 113 pupils. The Catechism was taught to the Catholic pupils on weekdays from 3pm to 3:30pm and on Saturdays from 10:30m to 12:30pm. The 41st Report from the Education Commissioners on 31 December 1874 states there were two teachers, both Roman Catholic, who received total salaries of £44. The school had 135 pupils enrolled, 75 boys and 60 girls, but the average daily attendance was only 52 pupils. In 1890 there were 110 pupils.
2. Site of a 19th century Corn-kiln.
3. Site of a blacksmith’s forge
4. Lime-kilns
5. Stepping stones over the river
