= Aghnacollia =

Townland in County Cavan, Ireland

Coordinates: 54.1706°N 7.7974°W

Aghnacollia (from Irish Achadh na Coille, meaning 'The Field of the Wood') is a townland in the civil parish of Templeport, County Cavan, Ireland. It lies in the Roman Catholic parish of Corlough and barony of Tullyhaw.

== Geography ==
Aghnacollia is bounded on the north by Commas (Kinawley) townland, on the west by Legnaderk townland and on the east by Altbrean and Altachullion Lower townlands. Its chief geographical features are mountain streams, waterfalls and a spring well. Aghnacollia is traversed by the R200 road (Ireland), minor public roads and rural lanes. The townland covers 323 statute acres. The local pronunciation is Ahnacarrilla.

== History ==
In earlier times the townland was probably uninhabited as it consists mainly of bog and poor clay soils. It was not seized by the English during the Plantation of Ulster in 1610 or in the Cromwellian Settlement of the 1660s so some dispossessed Irish families moved there and began to clear and farm the land.

The earliest reference to the townland seems to be in a deed by Arthur Ellis dated 19 March 1768 which includes the lands of Aughnacorrell.

A deed by Gore Ellis dated 24 Feb 1776 includes the lands of Aghnacarroll.

In the 19th century the landlord was Lord John Beresford, the Protestant Archbishop of Armagh. The muddled land history of the area prior to this is described in the 1838 Exchequer case, "Attorney General of Ireland v The Lord Primate". The maps used in the case spell the name as Aughnacurralia.

The Ordnance Survey Name Books for 1836 give the following description of the townland- Limestone can be procured in different parts of the land but it is not quarried nor used in any way whatever.

The Aghnacollia Valuation Office Field books are available for August 1839.

In 1841 the population of the townland was 22, being 11 males and 11 females. There were two houses in the townland, all of which were inhabited.

In 1851 the population of the townland was 26, being 13 males and 13 females. There were three houses in the townland and all were inhabited.

Griffith's Valuation of 1857 lists two landholders in the townland.

In 1861 the population of the townland was 13, being 6 males and 7 females. There were two houses in the townland and all were inhabited.

In 1871 the population of the townland was 16, being 9 males and 7 females. There were three houses in the townland, all were inhabited.

In 1881 the population of the townland was 19, being 9 males and 10 females. There were three houses in the townland, all were inhabited.

In 1891 the population of the townland was 14, being 7 males and 7 females. There were three houses in the townland, all were inhabited.

In the 1901 census of Ireland, there are three families listed in the townland.

In the 1911 census of Ireland, there are four families listed in the townland.

There are no structures of historical interest in the townland.
