= Altachullion Lower =

Townland in County Cavan, Ireland

Coordinates: 54.1615°N 7.7781°W

Altachullion Lower (from Irish Alt an Chuilinn Íochtarach, meaning 'The Lower Glen of the Holly') is a townland in the civil parish of Templeport, County Cavan, Ireland. It lies in the Roman Catholic parish of Corlough and barony of Tullyhaw.

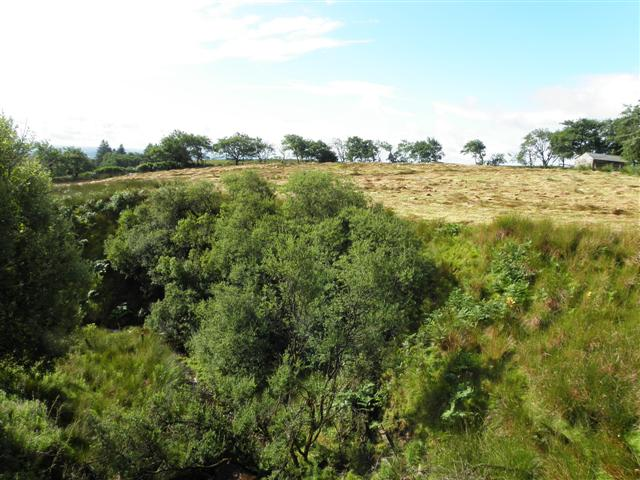
Altachullion Lower Looking north from the R200 road.

== Geography ==
Altachullion Lower is bounded on the north by Altbrean townland, on the south by Altachullion Upper townland, on the west by Legnaderk and Aghnacollia townlands and on the east by Altinure townland. Its chief geographical features are forestry plantations, mountain streams and waterfalls. Altachullion Lower is traversed by the R200 road (Ireland), the L1019 public road and rural lanes. The townland covers 276 statute acres.

== History ==
In earlier times the townland was probably uninhabited as it consists mainly of bog and poor clay soils. It was not seized by the English during the Plantation of Ulster in 1610 or in the Cromwellian Settlement of the 1660s so some dispossessed Irish families moved there and began to clear and farm the land.

The earliest reference to the townland is on a map dated 1813 where it is called Altaghullen. In the 19th century the landlord was Lord John Beresford, the Protestant Archbishop of Armagh.

The muddled land history of the area prior to this is described in the 1838 Exchequer case, "Attorney General of Ireland v The Lord Primate". The maps used in the case are viewable online at- Search Results - tullyhaw

The Tithe Applotment Books for 1826 list eight tithepayers in the townland.

The Ordnance Survey Name Books for 1836 give the following description of the townland- The soil is light being intermixed with sandstone and the general produce are oats, rye, potatoes & flax. This townland pays no cess as it is considered a track of mountain.

The Altachullion Lower Valuation Office Field books are available for August 1839.

In 1841 the population of the townland was 40, being 22 males and 18 females. There were five houses in the townland, all of which were inhabited.

In 1851 the population of the townland was 53, being 27 males and 26 females. There were ten houses in the townland and all were inhabited.

Griffith's Valuation of 1857 lists twenty landholders in the townland.

In 1861 the population of the townland was 57, being 29 males and 28 females. There were ten houses in the townland and one was uninhabited.

In 1871 the population of the townland was 31, being 14 males and 17 females. There were seven houses in the townland, all were inhabited.

In 1881 the population of the townland was 52, being 30 males and 22 females. There were eleven houses in the townland, of which one was uninhabited.

In 1891 the population of the townland was 53, being 28 males and 25 females. There were nine houses in the townland, all were inhabited.

In the 1901 census of Ireland, there are ten families listed in the townland.

In the 1911 census of Ireland, there are eleven families listed in the townland.

== Antiquities ==
The chief structures of historical interest in the townland are

1. Maguire’s Chair situate at Blackrocks Cross. The book Bawnboy and Templeport by Chris Maguire states- Maguire's Chair is the name given to a great rock formation along the road which leads from Bawnboy to Glangevlin. It is in the townland of Altachullion about four perch from where the road from Swanlinbar joins the main road. There's an old tradition about how it got its name. This is the story. Once when there was a war on between the Magauran and Maguire Clans, Maguire marched with his men along the mountains and called a halt at this place. The army had lunch there, the clansmen sitting on the rocks all around while the Maguire Chief sat on the large rock. Hence the name Maguire's Chair. Cavan Museum states- About 4 miles from Glangevlin stands a large glacial erratic known as ‘Maguire’s Chair’. Various stories are told about its name; one story claims that the stone was where the chief of the Maguire clan was inaugurated in medieval times. Another tale tells of a time also during the medieval period when Maguire sat in judgement here in a dispute between the McGoverns and the O’Rourkes of Leitrim. During the Penal Laws, the spot was used as a lookout point to warn priests saying mass. It was also a popular spot for dancing and games playing on the last Sunday of July or the first Sunday of August, called Donagh Sunday, Bilberry Sunday or the Festival of Lughnasadh.
2. The site of an old school near Barney Reilly's. It was a thatched School with mud-walls. It was very uncomfortable. The 1874 Report from the Commissioners of National Education in Ireland state that Altachullin School, Roll No. 9469, had 140 pupils, 65 boys and 75 girls. The current Altachullion School replaced it in the year 1890.Old Schools It had 121 pupils in 1890.
3. Limestone bridge built c. 1850 ALTACHULLION LOWER, CAVAN
