= Tullybrack =

Townland in County Cavan, Ireland

Tullybrack (from Irish Tulaigh Bhreac, meaning 'Speckled Hillock') is a townland in the civil parish of Templeport, County Cavan, Ireland. It lies in the Roman Catholic parish of Corlough and barony of Tullyhaw.

== Geography ==
Tullybrack is bounded on the north by Tullyloughfin townland, on the west by Owencam townland, on the south by Tullywaum and Tullytrasna townlands and on the east by Eaglehill and Corracholia More townlands. Its chief geographical features are a mountain stream and a gravel pit. Tullybrack is traversed by minor public roads and rural lanes. The townland covers 192 statute acres.

== History ==
In earlier times the townland was probably uninhabited as it consists mainly of bog and poor clay soils. It was not seized by the English during the Plantation of Ulster in 1610 or in the Cromwellian Settlement of the 1660s so some dispossessed Irish families moved there and began to clear and farm the land.

A lease dated 17 September 1816 John Enery of Bawnboy includes Tullybrack.

The Tithe Applotment Books for 1826 list the following tithepayers in the townland- Darcy, Finlay, Magauran, McGoldrick.

The Ordnance Survey Name Books for 1836 give the following description of the townland- Tullybrack. Contains 192 acres, of which 79 are cultivated boggy pasture and 4 are bog...The townland is bounded on the N. by a large mountain stream.

The Tullybrack Valuation Office Field books are available for September 1839.

In 1841 there were 10 houses in the townland, of which 2 were uninhabited. The population was 51, 25 males and 26 females.

In 1851 there were 12 houses in the townland, of which 2 were uninhabited. The population was 68, 40 males and 28 females. So the Great Famine (Ireland) did not seem to have an effect on the population.

Griffith's Valuation of 1857 lists thirteen landholders in the townland.

In 1861 the population of the townland was 72, being 40 males and 32 females. There were twelve houses in the townland, of which two were uninhabited.

In 1871 the population of the townland was 59, being 33 males and 26 females. There were thirteen houses in the townland and all were inhabited.(page 296 of census)

In 1881 the population of the townland was 70, being 39 males and 31 females. There were fourteen houses in the townland, one of which was uninhabited.

In 1891 the population of the townland was 87, being 40 males and 47 females. There were fifteen houses in the townland, all were inhabited.

In the 1901 census of Ireland, there are fifteen families listed in the townland.

In the 1911 census of Ireland, there are thirteen families listed in the townland.

== Antiquities ==
The chief structure of historical interest in the townland is the site of the old Tullybrack National School. The book Bawnboy and Templeport History Heritage Folklore, by Chris Maguire, gives the following description of the school-

A number of stories, mostly folklore, which appear in this book were collected by Frank Maguire, who for many years was a teacher in Tullybrack N.S. One of his predecessors as teacher in Tullybrack was John O'Hara, Corlough. John had been a hedge schoolmaster in the area before Tullybrack school was built. It was he who drew up the plans of the first Tullybrack school which was built in 1842. Mrs. O'Hara (no relation) from Lannanerriagh, was principal of Tullybrack N.S. from 1842-1850. At this time and later while teaching in Tullybrack, John lived in the townland of Corlough. A few years ago I had a letter from Monica, a granddaughter of John O'Hara, who lives in England. She writes as follows 'I don't know much about my grandfather, John O'Hara. He was a hedge schoolmaster who died in 1880. He could teach Latin, Irish, English reading and writing, and Mathematics, and he was a missionary, too. Hundreds of adults on that Cavan mountain - Upper Corlough, could only speak the Irish language. They seldom or never went to school or church at that time. There was only a wooden hut for a church in Corlough. Grandfather saw to it that they were all baptized and he had classes for them. He had a lot to do with getting that church (Corlough) off the ground. There was no priests' house but a priest came to say Mass on Sunday, so grandfather was curate. I don't know half of it. He also had a Sunday school. The priest who said Mass had breakfast with grandfather on Sundays. Then they discussed parish affairs and made arrangements for getting parish work done. Grandfather worked an eight-day week. When the new Corlough church was built it had bare stone walls, a roof and a mud floor. The people were very poor, there was no money. My aunt was a young girl then. 'When you'd stand or kneel the dust would choke you' Aunt said. She often said Grandfather should have been a priest'. I have seen the original lease for 999 years given by George Finlay, Esquire, J.P., Corville, Bawnboy, 1st part; The Commissioners of Education 2nd part, their Trustees, 3rd part, dated 12 December 1842, now in possession of Philip McGovern, Tullybrack, Corlough. The Trustees were Very Rev. Philip Magauran P.P., Springhill, Edward Reilly, Gubnagree and Patrick Magauran, Tullybrack all of the parish of Templeport. Attached to the lease is a plan of the school and playground drawn up by John O'Hara, Surveyor, 7 October 1842. Area of school ground 2 roods 1 perch Irish Plantation Measure. And whereas there has been built and erected on the ground hereinafter mentioned and demised, a school-house for the Education of the Poor Children (male and female) in the Parish of Templeport aforesaid to be called Tullybrack N.S. …….. and the Commissioners of the said school directed that a sum of seventy four pounds three shillings and four pence sterling should be paid to the said Trustees….. together with another sum of fifty three pounds one shilling and eight pence raised by voluntary contributions or locally subscribed makes the sum of £127-5s, which last mentioned sum has been laid out and expended in the erection of said schoolhouse.

In the 1830s the original teacher John O'Hara wrote several letters to John O'Donovan (scholar) about the history of the area and these are available for perusal in the Graves Collection in the Royal Irish Academy Dublin.

The Reports from the Commissioners of National Education in Ireland give the following figures for Tullybrack Boys' School, Roll No. 3157 and Tullybrack Girls' School, Roll No. 4141-

1846: Tullybrack Boys School. One male teacher who received an annual salary of £18.10s. There were 180 male pupils. Tullybrack Girls School. One female teacher who received an annual salary of £8. There were 128 female pupils.

1854: Tullybrack Boys School. One male teacher who received an annual salary of £22. There were 96 male pupils. Tullybrack Girls School. One female teacher who received an annual salary of £10. There were 87 female pupils.

1862: Tullybrack Boys School. John O'Hara was the headmaster and John Meehan was the monitor, both Roman Catholics. There were 125 pupils, all Roman Catholic apart from 1 who was Church of Ireland. The Catechism was taught to the Catholic pupils on weekdays from 10am to 10:30am and on Saturdays from 10:30am to 1:30pm. Tullybrack Girls School. Mary McGovern was the headmistress, a Roman Catholic. There were 94 pupils, all Roman Catholic. The Catechism was taught to the pupils on Saturdays from 12 noon to 1pm.

1874: Tullybrack Boys School. One male teacher who received an annual salary of £20. There were 68 male pupils. Tullybrack Girls School. One female teacher who received an annual salary of £8. There were 56 female pupils.

1890: The boys' school had 104 and the girls' school had 78 pupils.
