= Derrynananta Upper =

Townland in County Cavan, Ireland

Derrynananta Upper, an Anglicisation of the Gaelic, ‘Doire na Neannta Uachtarach’, meaning The Upper Oak-wood of the Nettles, is a townland in the civil parish of Templeport, County Cavan, Ireland. The townland lies in the Roman Catholic parish of Glangevlin and barony of Tullyhaw. In the 19th century, it was also known as Derrynananta Lodge, after a shooting-lodge there called Glengavlen Lodge, which was owned by John Cole, 2nd Earl of Enniskillen.

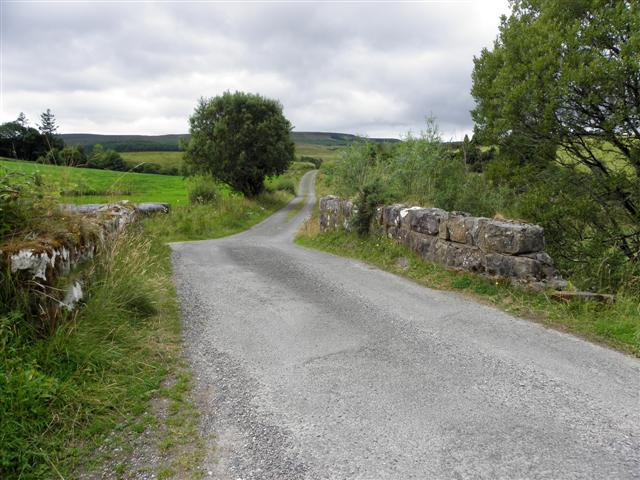
Road at Derrynananta Upper townland, Glangevlin parish, County Cavan, Ireland, heading west

== Geography ==
Derrynananta Upper is bounded on the north by Derrynananta Lower townland, on the west by Moneensauran townland, on the east by Gowlan, Lannanerriagh and Tullyveela townlands and on the south by Doon (Drumreilly) townland. Its chief geographical features are Derrynananta Lough, mountain streams, waterfalls, stone cliffs, a Flow Bog, a sulphurous spa well, forestry plantations and spring wells. The townland is traversed by minor public roads and rural lanes. The townland covers 1,054 statute acres.

== History ==
The 1652 Commonwealth Survey spells the name as Dirrenanta and gives the owner as Henry Robinson with the tenants being John King & others. Henry Robinson also owned the townlands of Derryragh and Camagh in Templeport parish.

The 1790 Cavan Carvaghs list spells the name as Derunant.

The Tithe Applotment Books for 1826 list three tithepayers in the townland.

The Ordnance Survey Name Books for 1836 give the following description of the townland- The soil is light and stoney...The townland is bounded on the east and west sides by two very large streams running from south to north on the west bank of the east branch of the stream. There is a handsome shooting lodge called Glangavlin belonging to Lord Enniskillen.

The Derrynananta Upper Valuation Office Field books are available for August 1839.

Griffith's Valuation of 1857 lists eight landholders in the townland.

In the 19th century the landlords of Derrynananta Lower were the Annesley Estate and Bernard McGovern.

The Police Gazette for 24 September 1886 states:

Cavan. DESCRIPTION of two head of cattle, the property of Charles Magovern, which were stolen from the lands of Derrynanta Upper, parish of Templeport, barony of Tullyhaw, on the night of 14th September 1886 :— (1) Yellow colour, short thick horn, two years old, with calf, in good condition; value about £7. (2) Yellow colour, short fine horns, white star on forehead of triangular shape, white spot on left hind flank, with calf, in fair condition; value about £7.

A folktale relating to Derrynanta Lough is found in the 1938 Dúchas collection.

== Census ==
Year	Population	Males	Females	Total Houses	Uninhabited
1841	64	32	32	9	0
1851	66	34	32	8	0
1861	52	31	21	7	0
1871	49	27	22	8	0
1881	52	23	29	9	0
1891	69	32	37	11	0

In the 1901 census of Ireland, there are thirteen families listed in the townland.

In the 1911 census of Ireland, there are ten families listed in the townland.
