= Knockroe (Kinawley) =

Townland in County Cavan, Ireland

Knockroe (Irish derived place name Cnoc Rua, meaning ‘The Red Hill’) is a townland in the civil parish of Kinawley, barony of Tullyhaw, County Cavan, Ireland.

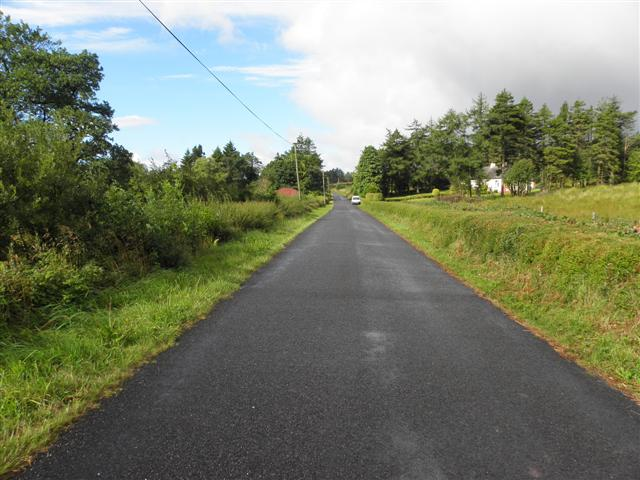
Road at Knockroe (geograph 3596755)

== Geography ==
Knockroe is bounded on the north by Gubnafarna townland, on the west by Binkeeragh, Sralahan (Kinawley) and Tullydermot townlands and on the east by Drumcask and Knockranny townlands. Its chief geographical features are the River Cladagh (Swanlinbar), mountain streams, forestry plantations, dug wells and a gravel pit. Knockroe is traversed by the L1019 local road, minor public roads and rural lanes. The townland covers 229 statute acres.

== History ==
The 1821 Census of Ireland spells the name as Nockroa and Knockrea and states- Knockrea contains 16 acres of arable land & 84 acres of bog & mountain.

The 1834 Tithe Applotment Books spell the name as Knockrow.

The Knockroe Valuation Office Field books are available for 1838.

Griffith's Valuation lists ten landholders in the townland.

The landlords of Knockroe in the 19th century were the Hassard Estate and the Crofton Estate. The National Library of Ireland holds rentals of the Crofton estate from 1769 to 1814, MS Numbers 20,783 and 4530. The last eviction was c.1878.

== Census ==
Year	Population	Males	Females	Total Houses	Uninhabited
1841	50	27	23	7	0
1851	36	18	18	6	0
1861	31	14	17	6	1
1871	33	18	15	5	0
1881	20	11	9	5	0
1891	19	11	8	5	0

In the 1821 Census of Ireland, there were nine families in the townland.

In the 1901 census of Ireland, there were five families listed in the townland.

In the 1911 census of Ireland, there were five families listed in the townland.

== Antiquities ==
1. Knockroe 19th century Hedge-School. Mrs McGoldrick was the teacher.
2. Stone bridges over the river.
3. Stepping-stones over the river.
4. A foot-bridge over the river.
