= Binkeeragh =

Townland in County Cavan, Ireland

Binkeeragh (Irish derived place name, either Binn Chaorach, meaning ‘The Mountain Peak of the Sheep’ or Minkeeragh, meaning ‘The Mountain Pasture of the Sheep’) is a townland in the civil parish of Kinawley, barony of Tullyhaw, County Cavan, Ireland.

== Geography ==
Binkeeragh is bounded on the north by Commas (Kinawley) townland, on the south by Knockroe (Kinawley) townland, on the west by Tullydermot townland and on the east by Aghaboy (Kinawley) and Gubnafarna townlands. Its chief geographical features are Cuilcagh mountain on whose eastern side it lies, reaching a height of 951 feet; Pollnagollum Cave (Irish derived place name Poll na gColmán, meaning 'The Hole of the Pigeons') on the boundary with Aghaboy townland, described as- A fine open pot masked by vegetation, north wall 40 feet high. An easy scramble. Three passages, the longest is 75 yards; and also- The upper part of the limestone occurs here and there is a cave called Pulgulm or the Pigeon hole from which a subterranean mountain stream emerges about which there are some fossils. In this cave the surface of the limestone has a high degree of polish probably from the friction of particles contained in the muddy waters which flow through it in floods and which flow down from the sandstone and argillaceous strata of the coal rocks; and also- If we except the cave of Dunmore in the county of Kilkenny which is mentioned in the Report on the Leinster coal district, none is more curious than the cave called Pulgulm or the Pigeonhole, three miles to the south of Swanlinbar in the County of Cavan. This cavern is narrow but very lofty and more than half a mile in length in a northern direction, in a southern direction it descends very rapidly. Its length was not ascertained from the difficulty of proceeding. The lower, and many of the loose rocks which cover the bottom of the cave, are as highly polished on the surface as the most finished piece of marble. This must have been effected by the dropping of water: though water falling through the fissures of a limestone cavern usually forms calcareous stalactites from the roof and calcareous incrustations on the sides. This is not the case at Pulgulm; the difference may be attributed to the flowing of the water directly from the colliery hills into the cavern and, meeting no limestone in the way, it is not likely to contain any thing but particles of sand and clay, the constant friction of which may have had the effect of polishing the surface of the limestone in the cavern; mountain streams; river swallowholes; a wood; a spring well; dug wells and caverns. Binkeeragh is traversed by minor public roads and rural lanes. The townland covers 297 statute acres.

== History ==
In the 1609 Plantation of Ulster, Binkeeragh formed part of the mountain of Cuilcagh which were granted to John Sandford of Castle Doe, Co. Donegal (the father-in-law of Thomas Guyllym of Ballyconnell) by letters patent dated 7 July 1613 (Pat. 11 James I – LXXI – 38, ‘Quilkagh’). It was later sold by Sandford to his wife's uncle Toby Caulfeild, 1st Baron Caulfeild, Master of the Ordnance and Caulfield had the sale confirmed by letters patent of 12 July 1620 (Pat. 19 James I. XI. 45 ‘‘Quilkagh’’).

A deed by Thomas Enery dated 29 Jan 1735 includes the lands of Minkeeragh.

A deed dated 13 December 1774 by John Enery spells the townland as Minkeeraugh otherwise Minkeeragh.

The 1821 Census of Ireland spells the name as Binkeeraugh and states- containing 350 acres of black & green mountain.

The Tithe Applotment Books 1834 spell the name as Benkeera.

The Binkeeragh Valuation Office Field books are available for 1838.

Griffith's Valuation lists seven landholders in the townland.

The landlord of Binkeeragh in the 19th century was the Hassard Estate.

== Census ==
Year	Population	Males	Females	Total Houses	Uninhabited
1841	33	19	14	6	0
1851	38	22	16	7	0
1861	36	19	17	7	0
1871	40	21	19	7	1
1881	39	21	18	8	0
1891	41	23	18	8	0

In the Census of Ireland 1821, there were six families living in the townland.

In the 1901 census of Ireland, there were seven families listed in the townland.

In the 1911 census of Ireland, there were seven families listed in the townland.

== Antiquities ==
1. A 19th century corn-kiln.
2. Lime-kilns
3. Stepping-stones over the stream
4. A foot-bridge over the stream
