= Altbrean =

Townland in County Cavan, Ireland

Coordinates: 54.1681°N 7.7714°W

Altbrean (Irish derived place name Alt Bréan, meaning the 'Smelly Gorge’, so-called because of the decayed vegetation in the swamp at the bottom of the slope) is a townland in the civil parish of Kinawley, barony of Tullyhaw, County Cavan, Ireland.

== Geography ==
Altbrean is bounded on the north by Tullydermot townland, on the south by Altachullion Lower townland, on the west by Aghnacollia and Commas (Kinawley) townlands and on the east by Altinure, Gubrawully and Sralahan (Kinawley) townlands. Its chief geographical features are hills which rise to 752 feet above sea level, the River Cladagh (Swanlinbar), waterfalls, river swallowholes, a gravel pit, a spring well and dug wells. Altbrean is traversed by the local L1019 road, minor public roads and rural lanes. The townland covers 329 statute acres.

== History ==
In earlier times the townland was probably uninhabited as it consists mainly of bog and poor clay soils. It was not seized by the English during the Plantation of Ulster in 1610 or in the Cromwellian Settlement of the 1660s so some dispossessed Irish families moved there and began to clear and farm the land.

The 1825 Tithe Applotment Books spell the name as Altbrean.

The 1836 Ordnance Survey Namebooks state- As it is merely a track of mountain, it is free from county cess and tithe.

Griffith's Valuation lists nine landholders in the townland.

The landlord of the townland in the 19th century was the Hassard estate.

== Census ==
Year	Population	Males	Females	Total Houses	Uninhabited
1841	29	11	18	5	0
1851	58	23	25	8	0
1861	46	21	25	9	2
1871	14	7	7	4	0
1881	32	17	15	5	0
1891	40	22	14	5	0

In the 1901 census of Ireland, there are six families listed in the townland.

In the 1911 census of Ireland, there are seven families listed in the townland.

== Antiquities ==
1. Stone bridges over the river, including Commas Bridge, a single-arch sandstone bridge, built c.1860 over the Claddagh River.
2. Stepping-stones over the river
