= Tullydermot =

Townland in County Cavan, Ireland

Tullydermot (Irish derived place name Tulaigh Dhiarmuda, meaning ‘The Hill of Dermot’) is a townland in the civil parish of Kinawley, barony of Tullyhaw, County Cavan, Ireland.

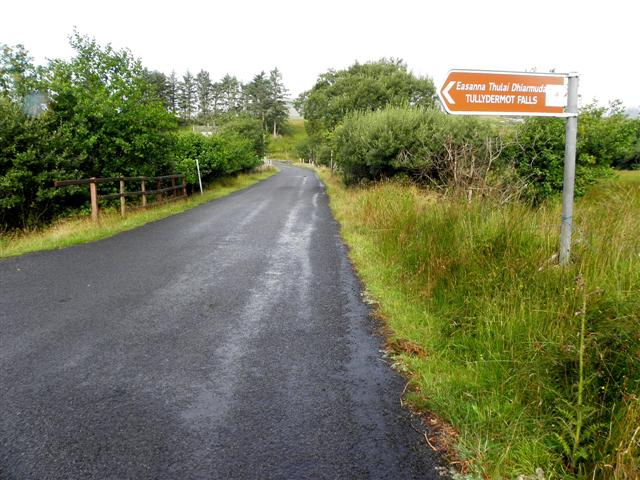
Road at Tullydermot (geograph 3596769)

== Geography ==
Tullydermot is bounded on the north by Commas (Kinawley) townland, on the south by Altbrean, Knockroe (Kinawley) and Sralahan (Kinawley) townlands and on the east by Binkeeragh townland. Its chief geographical features are Cuilcagh mountain on whose southern slope it lies, the River Cladagh (Swanlinbar), mountain streams, a dug well, forestry plantations and Tullydermot Waterfall.

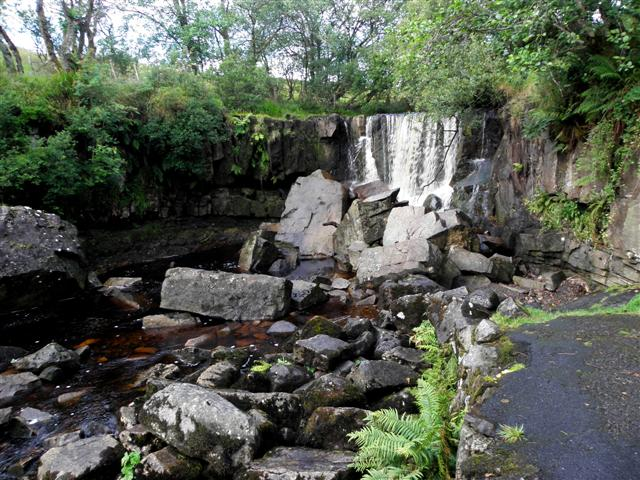
Tullydermot Falls (geograph 3596766)

Tullydermot is traversed by the L1019 local road, minor public roads and rural lanes. The townland covers 178 statute acres.

== History ==
In the 1609 Plantation of Ulster, Tullydermot formed part of the mountain of Cuilcagh which were granted to John Sandford of Castle Doe, Co. Donegal (the father-in-law of Thomas Guyllym of Ballyconnell) by letters patent dated 7 July 1613 (Pat. 11 James I – LXXI – 38, "Quilkagh"). It was later sold by Sandford to his wife's uncle Toby Caulfeild, 1st Baron Caulfeild, Master of the Ordnance and Caulfield had the sale confirmed by letters patent of 12 July 1620 (Pat. 19 James I. XI. 45 "Quilkagh").

The 1836 Ordnance Survey Namebooks states: The soil is very bad.

Griffith's Valuation lists five landholders in the townland.

In the 19th century, James Veitch was the landlord of Tullydermot.

Folklore relating to Tullydermot was collected in the 1938 Dúchas collection.

== Census ==
Year	Population	Males	Females	Total Houses	Uninhabited
1841	22	11	11	4	0
1851	18	6	12	4	0
1861	19	7	12	4	0
1871	14	7	7	4	0
1881	17	9	8	5	0
1891	25	13	12	5	0

In the 1901 census of Ireland, there were five families listed in the townland.

In the 1911 census of Ireland, there were four families listed in the townland.

== Antiquities ==
1. Stone bridges over the river, including Commas Bridge, a single-arch sandstone bridge, built c. 1860 over the Claddagh River.
2. Stepping-stones over the river
