= Bellavally Upper =

Townland in County Cavan, Ireland

Bellavally Upper, in Gaelic= 'Béal an Bhealaigh Uachtarach', meaning The Upper Entrance to the Pass or Gap, is a townland in the civil parish of Templeport, County Cavan, Ireland. The local pronunciation is Bealbally. It lies in the Roman Catholic parish of Glangevlin and barony of Tullyhaw.

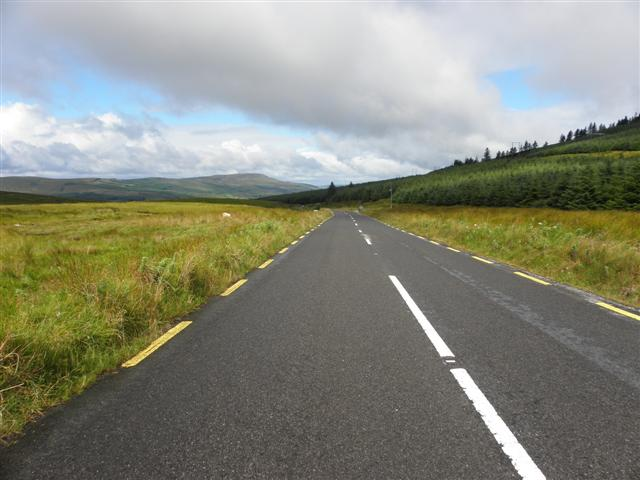
R200, Bellavally Upper (geograph 3597144)

== Geography ==
Bellavally Upper is bounded on the north by Bellavally Lower townland, on the west by Derrynananta Lower townland, on the east by Altnadarragh, Commas (Kinawley) and Legnaderk townlands and on the south by Altateskin townland. It is part of the Cuilcagh mountain range and its chief geographical features are Benbrack Mountain (An Bhinn Bhreac meaning ‘The Speckled Peak’), which reaches a height of 503 metres, Benbeg Mountain (An Bhinn Bheag meaning ‘The Small Peak’), which reaches a height of 539 metres, Bellavally Gap, the Owenmore River (County Cavan), mountain streams, waterfalls, forestry plantations and gravel pits. Bellavally Upper is traversed by the regional R200 road (Ireland), minor public roads and rural lanes. The townland is popular with mountain hikers and is also noted for geological formations such as the Dinantian (Asbian) Glenade Sandstone Formation and the Bellavally Formation. The townland covers 698 statute acres.

== History ==
The earliest surviving mention of the name relates to the Battle of Magh Slecht in 1256 which took place in Bellavally between the O’Reilly and O’Rourke clans. The Annals of Connacht for that year state- The main army came up with them after some of their men had been killed: Diarmait O Flannacain, Mac Maenaig, Coiclid O Coiclid and a number of others; and the combined armies came to Alt na hElti and Doirin Cranncha, between Ath na Betige and Bel in Belaig and Coill Esa and Coill Airthir, on Slieve Anierin.

In 1339 the chief of the McGovern clan, Tomás Mág Samhradháin (died 1340), was released from captivity. Poem XXII in The Book of Magauran by the poet Maol Pádraig Mac Naimhin (or Cnáimhín) commemorates his release and refers to Bellavally. Stanza 15 states- Gabháil Méig Shamhradhán sheing do líon d'urchradhaibh Éirinn, bheith i láimh do bharr Bhealaigh tall a ngráin do Ghaoidhealaibh, (Graceful McGovern’s capture, the imprisonment of Bealach’s chief and some Gael being held in horror- these things fill Ireland with woe).

The 1652 Commonwealth Survey spells the name as Bealbaly and lists the proprietor as The Lord of Cavan (i.e. Charles Lambart, 1st Earl of Cavan).

A deed dated 10 May 1744 spells the name as Bealbally.

The Tithe Applotment Books for 1826 list sixteen tithepayers in the townland but this would probably include both Bellavally Upper and Lower townlands.

The Ordnance Survey Name Books for 1836 give the following description of the townland- The part which is arable is only reclaimed mountain...There is a remarkable hollow between two mountains called Balebally Gap which the road from Bawnboy to Glan chapel passes through. There is an ancient legend concerning this place. Iron ore, sandstone and slate is found in the mountain but it is not quarried nor used in any way whatever.

In his A Topographical Dictionary of Ireland published in 1837, Samuel Lewis (publisher) states- To the west of Swanlinbar rises the Bealbally mountains, through which is the Gap of Beal, the only entrance to Glangavlin.

A local folktale occurred about 1838 in Bellavally.

The Bellavally Upper Valuation Office Field books are available for August 1839.

Griffith's Valuation of 1857 lists nine landholders in the townland.

In the 19th century the landlords of Bellavally were the Annesley and Blachford Estates.

== Census ==
Year	Population	Males	Females	Total Houses	Uninhabited
1841	58	27	31	11	1
1851	46	26	20	8	0
1861	67	33	34	14	1
1871	65	27	38	11	0
1881	34	17	17	7	0
1891	41	22	19	7	0

In the 1901 census of Ireland, there are eight families listed in the townland.

In the 1911 census of Ireland, there are seven families listed in the townland.

== Antiquities ==
1. Stone bridges, stepping-stones and footbridges over the Owenmore River.
