= Corlough townland =

Townland in County Cavan, Ireland

Coordinates: 54.1260°N 7.7681°W

Corlough (from Irish Corlach, meaning 'stony hill' or 'hilly place') is a townland in County Cavan, Ireland. It lies in the Roman Catholic parish of Corlough, and within the civil parish of Templeport in the historical barony of Tullyhaw.

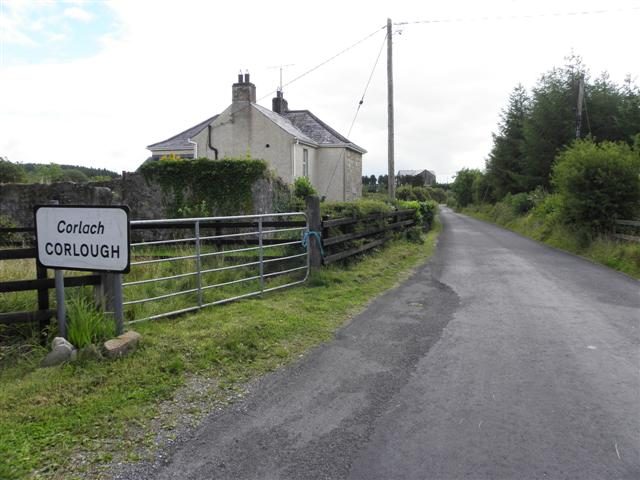
Corlough townland, County Cavan, Ireland. Looking SSE.

== Geography ==
Corlough is bounded on the north by Tullytrasna townland, on the west by Corrachomera townland, on the south by Leitra, Corlough townland and on the east by Cornacleigh and Knockmore, County Cavan townlands. Its chief geographical features are the River Blackwater, County Cavan, forestry plantations, gravel pits, dug wells and spring wells. Corlough is traversed by minor public roads and rural lanes. The townland covers 208 statute acres. A sub-division is called Tullynahaltra (Tulaig na hAltór = The Hill of the Altars, because there was a Mass Rock in the field).

== History ==
In earlier times the townland was probably uninhabited as it consists mainly of bog and poor clay soils. It was not seized by the English during the Plantation of Ulster in 1610 or in the Cromwellian Settlement of the 1660s so some dispossessed Irish families moved there and began to clear and farm the land. An alternative name for the townland was Curraghlahan (Carrach Leathan = The Broad Bog).

The 1790 Cavan Carvaghs list spells the name as Corclagh.

In 1804 Lowther Kirkwood of Mullinagrave, parish of Templeport, Co. Cavan, gentleman made the following will-

2 July 1804. To his grandnephew Lowther Brien, city of Dublin, attorney, and his heirs his lands of Awengallis, Ballylenan, Ballymagirill, Stranadarragh, Carnagimlie, Cullagh, Drumleden, Leitry [Leitra], Corlagh, Lananleragh [Lannanerriagh], Gowlanlea and Drumlogher, Co. Cavan, held under lease from the Beresford family. He had begun a suit in Chancery, Ireland, against John Brien, late of Salvon, Co. Fermanagh, deceased, for setting aside a fraudulent deed obtained by said John Brien, which suit against the representatives is to be continued by said Lowther Brien, his sole exor. Witnesses: John Johnston and Andrew Rutledge, both of Ballymagiril, and Thos. Stephenson, Drumleaden, Co. Cavan, gent. Memorial witnessed by: said Andrew Rutledge, and John Balfour, city of Dublin, attorney.

A map of the townland drawn in 1813 is in the National Archives of Ireland, Beresford Estate Maps, which show the townland belonging to the Lord Primate of Armagh, Lord John Beresford and leased to Mr. Kirkwood who subleased to Patrick McGuire.

The Tithe Applotment Books for 1826 list nineteen tithepayers in the townland.

The Ordnance Survey Name Books for 1836 give the following description of the townland- The townland is bounded on the north and east sides by a large mountain stream...There is an Ordnance Survey triangulation station.

The Corlough Valuation Office Field books are available for 1839–1840.

In 1841 the population of the townland was 117, being 60 males and 57 females. There were twenty houses in the townland, all of which were inhabited.

In 1851 the population of the townland was 109, being 54 males and 55 females, the reduction being due to the Great Famine (Ireland). There were eighteen houses in the townland, one of which was uninhabited and one in the course of erection.

Griffith's Valuation of 1857 lists nineteen landholders in the townland.

On 6 July 1857 the Incumbered Estates Commission published the following notice-

In the Matter of the Estate of James Brien, Geo. Brien, Edward Brien and Francis Brien, Owners. Exparte by Isabella Crummer, Petitioner. The commissioners having ordered a Sale of the Lands of Shanadaragh and Curnagunlogh, Cullegh, Drumlohgher, Drumledin, Sananaragh, and Drumledin, and Corlough, situate in the Barony of Tullyhaw, and County of Cavan, held under lease dated the 10th April, 1718, from the Bishop Raphoe, for lives renewable for ever, and which Lands are included in the denominations of Ballymagord, Owngally, Gortneglough, Drumedin or Ballylennin, in said lease mentioned:

In 1861 the population of the townland was 116, being 59 males and 57 females. There were nineteen houses in the townland and all were inhabited.

In 1871 the population of the townland was 103, being 51 males and 52 females. There were sixteen houses in the townland, all were inhabited.

In 1881 the population of the townland was 118, being 58 males and 60 females. There were twenty-one houses in the townland, of which one was uninhabited.

In 1891 the population of the townland was 117, being 61 males and 56 females. There were twenty-one houses in the townland, all were inhabited.

In the 1901 census of Ireland, there are thirty families listed in the townland.

In the 1911 census of Ireland, there were 18 families listed in the townland.

== Antiquities ==
1. Saint Patrick's Roman Catholic Church and graveyard. The present church was built of sandstone in 1857 by the parish priest Father Patrick Smith. The previous church was in Arderry townland. An unusual feature of the church is the arched stables or shelter for horses which was built into one side of the Church. A mass rock from Penal times is built into one of the church pillars.
2. Saint Patricks National School. Opened on 28 September 2011.
3. Stone bridge built c.1770.
4. Stepping stones over the river
