= Culliagh =

Townland in County Cavan, Ireland

Coordinates: 54.105°N 7.741°W

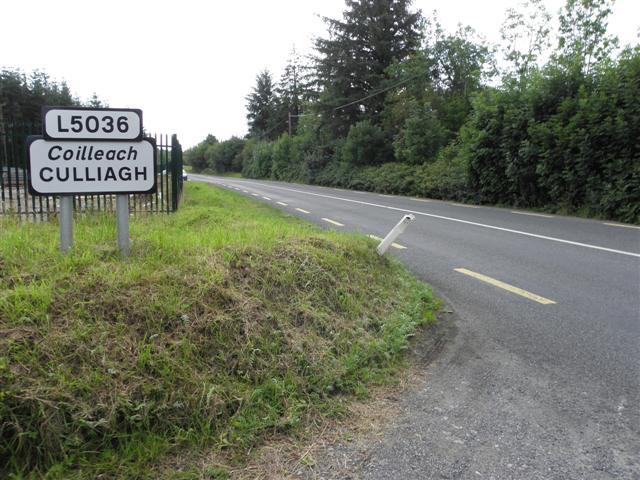
R202 at Culliagh (geograph 3610973)

Culliagh (from Irish Coilleach, meaning 'wooded place') is a townland in the civil parish of Templeport, County Cavan, Ireland. It lies in the Roman Catholic parish of Corlough and barony of Tullyhaw. The townland covers approximately 265 statute acres.

== History ==
In medieval times, the McGovern barony of Tullyhaw was divided into economic taxation areas called ballibetoes, from the Irish Baile Biataigh (Anglicized as 'Ballybetagh'), meaning 'A Provisioner's Town or Settlement'. There were seven ballibetoes in the parish of Templeport. Culliagh was located in the ballybetagh of Ballymackgonghan (Irish = Baile Mac Eochagain, meaning 'McEoghan's Town').

The 1609 Baronial Map depicts the townland as part of the four polls of BMcGoagh (an abbreviation of Ballemagoechan).

In the Plantation of Ulster by grant dated 13 March 1610, King James VI and I granted four polls of Ballemagoechan to Cahell M'Owen O Reyly. The four polls consisted of 1 in Bealaghlyan, 2 in Acoylagh and 1 in Cronarry, totalling 200 acres. The said Cathal O'Reilly was the nephew of two chiefs of the O'Reilly clan- Aodh Connallach mac Maolmhordha who was chief from 1565 to 1583 and Eamonn mac Maolmhordha who was chief from 1596 to 1601. He was also a brother of Cathaoir O'Reilly who received lands in Kildoagh townland and first cousin of Donill Backagh McShane O'Reyly who was simultaneously granted lands in Burren (townland).

An Inquisition of King Charles I of England held in Cavan Town on 31 March 1635 stated that "Cahell O Reily was seized in his lifetime of, inter alia, two polls of Acoylagh. He died 1 January 1634 and his son Hugh O'Reily had reached his majority and was married".

The 1652 Commonwealth Survey lists the name as Coylagh and lists the proprietor as Lieutenant-Colonel Tristram Beresford.

In the Hearth Money Rolls compiled on 29 September 1663, there were two people listed as paying the tax in Colagh: "Rory O Dolan and Teige O Dolan".

A grant dated 3 November 1666 was made by King Charles II of England to Sir Tristram Beresford, 1st Baronet which included, inter alia, "one cartron of Cornekilleagh or Corkilleagh containing 96 acres-3 roods-8 perches of land". By grant dated 11 September 1670 from King Charles II of England to said Sir Tristram Beresford, the said lands of Cornetilleagh were included in the creation of a new 'Manor of Beresford'.

The 1790 Cavan Carvaghs list spells the name as Culleagh.

Lowther Kirkwood of Mullinagrave, parish of Templeport, Co. Cavan, gentleman made the following will-

2 July 1804. To his grandnephew Lowther Brien, city of Dublin, attorney, and his heirs his lands of Awengallis, Ballylenan, Ballymagirill, Stranadarragh, Carnagimlie, Cullagh, Drumleden, Leitry, Corlagh, Lananleragh, Gowlanlea and Drumlogher, Co. Cavan, held under lease from the Beresford family. He had begun a suit in Chancery, Ireland, against John Brien, late of Salvon, Co. Fermanagh, deceased, for setting aside a fraudulent deed obtained by said John Brien, which suit against the representatives is to be continued by said Lowther Brien, his sole exor. Witnesses: John Johnston and Andrew Rutledge, both of Ballymagiril, and Thos. Stephenson, Drumleaden, Co. Cavan, gent. Memorial witnessed by: said Andrew Rutledge, and John Balfour, city of Dublin, attorney.

The Tithe Applotment Books for 1827 list nineteen tithepayers in the townland.

The 1836 Ordnance Survey Namebooks describe the townland as being "bounded on the west side by a large stream".

The Culliagh Valuation Office Field books are available for October 1839.

In 1841 the population of the townland was 118, being 51 males and 67 females. There were twenty-four houses in the townland, all of which were inhabited.

In 1851 the population of the townland was 76, being 40 males and 36 females, the reduction being due to the Great Famine (Ireland). There were seventeen houses in the townland, one of which was uninhabited.

Griffith's Valuation of 1857 lists twenty-four landholders in the townland.

On 6 July 1857 the Incumbered Estates Commission published the following notice-

In the Matter of the Estate of James Brien, Geo. Brien, Edward Brien and Francis Brien, Owners. Exparte by Isabella Crummer, Petitioner. The commissioners having ordered a Sale of the Lands of Shanadaragh and Curnagunlogh, Cullegh, Drumlohgher, Drumledin, Sananaragh, and Drumledin and Corlough, situate in the Barony of Tullyhaw, and County of Cavan, held under lease dated the 10th April, 1718, from the Bishop Raphoe, for lives renewable for ever, and which Lands are included in the denominations of Ballymagord, Owngally, Gortneglough, Drumedin or Ballylennin, in said lease mentioned:

In 1861 the population of the townland was 77, being 38 males and 39 females. There were seventeen houses in the townland and all were inhabited.

In the 1901 census of Ireland, there are fifteen families listed in the townland, and in the 1911 census of Ireland, there are sixteen families listed in the townland.

== Antiquities ==
Antiquities in teh area include:

- The site of a 19th-century Corn Mill, Kiln, Mill Race and Weir
- Stepping stones across the river
- An earthen fort which is described in the 1995 Archaeological Inventory of County Cavan (site 1320) as a "Subcircular slightly raised area (int. dims. 74m NE-SW; 53m NW-SE) enclosed by an earthen bank which has been modified and incorporated into the field boundary from SSW-W-N, and a fosse well preserved from SW-W-NW and replaced by field drains elsewhere. Both bank and fosse have been levelled from N-NNE-NE. Original entrance not recognisable".
