= Corlough =

Roman Catholic parish in County Cavan, Ireland

Coordinates: 54.1245°N 7.7691°W

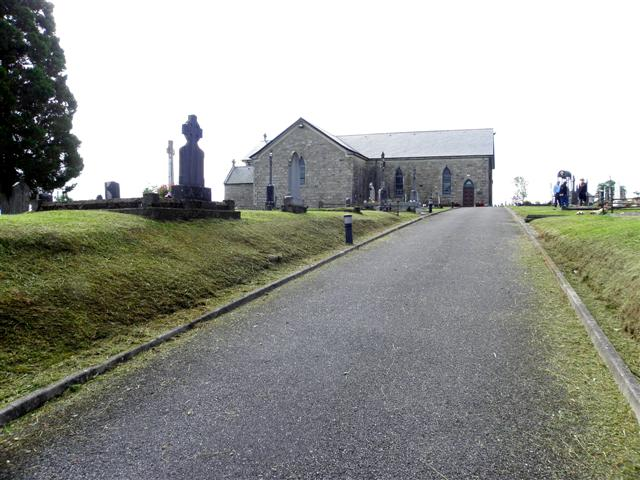
St Patrick's R.C. Church in Corlough, looking SSW

Corlough (Irish: Corlach) is a Catholic parish situated in the historical barony of Tullyhaw, County Cavan, Ireland. It derives its name from Corlough townland, in which the parish church is situated. It formed part of the larger parish of Templeport until 1877 when Corlough was made a separate parish. The area is the birthplace of Francis "Frankie" Curran, a musician who performed traditional Irish music for several decades in the United States and aiding in establishing East Durham, New York as the "33rd county".

== Etymology ==
The name of Corlough parish has an unclear derivation. Some references suggest that it means either 'the hill of the lake' or 'the lake of the herons'. These are less-likely meanings as there is no lake in the townland. The earliest reference to the townland is in the 1790 list of County Cavan townlands where it is spelled "Corclagh", which would be an Anglicization of "Cor Cloch", meaning either 'the stone on the round hill' or "the stony hill".

Corlough townland, within Corlough parish, is recorded in the Placenames Database of Ireland as Corlach, meaning "hilly place".

== Transport ==
Bus Éireann route 464 (Carrigallen-Ballinamore-Enniskillen) serves Corlough Cross on Thursdays only.
