= Curraghabweehan =

Townland in Templeport, County Cavan, Ireland

Curraghabweehan (from Irish Currach an Bhuíochain, meaning 'Moor of the Muddy Yellow Place') is a townland in the civil parish of Templeport, County Cavan, Ireland. It lies in the Roman Catholic parish of Corlough and barony of Tullyhaw.

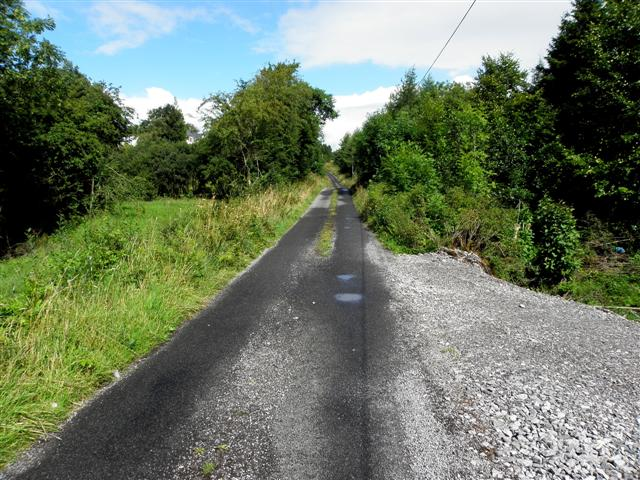
Road at Curraghabweehan townland, Corlough parish, County Cavan, Ireland. Heading eastwards

== Geography ==
Curraghabweehan is bounded on the west by Corraclassy townland, on the south by Garvary (Corlough) townland, on the north by Drumbeagh townland and on the east by Derryvahan townland. Its chief geographical features are the Owensallagh river (a source of the River Blackwater, County Cavan) and dug wells. Curraghabweehan is traversed by minor public roads and rural lanes. The townland covers 55 statute acres.

== History ==
In the Plantation of Ulster by grant dated 27 February 1610, along with other lands, King James VI and I granted one poll of Drombeagh and Corroboan to William O'Shereden, gentleman, Cheefe of his Name. William Sheridan was the chief of the Sheridan Clan in County Cavan. He was the son of the previous chief, Hugh Duff O'Sheridan of Togher townland, Kilmore parish, County Cavan. William was the ancestor of the famous Sheridan theatrical family. William died sometime before 1638, leaving two sons, Owen (of Mullaghmore, Tullyhunco) and Patrick (of Raleagh townland, Kildallan parish). Owen Sheridan succeeded to his father's lands. Owen's son Denis was born in 1612 and became a Catholic priest in charge of Kildrumferton parish, County Cavan. He later converted to Protestantism and on 10 June 1634 William Bedell, the Protestant Bishop of Kilmore, ordained him as a Minister of the Church of Ireland and two days later Denis was collated to the Vicarage of Killasser in the Diocese of Kilmore. Denis had several children, including William Sheridan (Bishop of Kilmore and Ardagh) 1682-1691 (his son Donald kept up the Templeport connection by marrying Mrs Enery of Bawnboy); Patrick Sheridan, Cloyne, Protestant Bishop of Cloyne (1679-1682) and Sir Thomas Sheridan (politician) Chief Secretary of State for Ireland (1687-1688).

The Sheridan lands in Curraghabweehan were confiscated in the Cromwellian Act for the Settlement of Ireland 1652 and were distributed as follows:

The 1652 Commonwealth Survey lists the townland as Curraghabeghan and the proprietor as Lieutenant-Colonel Tristram Beresford. A further confirming grant dated 3 November 1666 was made by King Charles II of England to the aforementioned Sir Tristram Beresford, 1st Baronet included, inter alia, 76 acres and 3 roods in Curraghboghan and Drumbeagh. By grant dated 11 September 1670 from King Charles II of England to said Sir Tristram Beresford, the lands of Curraghbegan and Drumbeagh were included in the creation of a new Manor of Beresford.

The 1790 Cavan Carvaghs list spells the name as Curraghbredin.

An 1831 map depicts the townland as Curraghboghan and Curraghoghan.

The Tithe Applotment Books for 1827 list seven tithepayers in the townland.

The 1836 Ordnance Survey Namebooks describe the townland as- The soil is of a clayey nature...The townland is bounded on the north side by a large stream.

The Curraghabweehan Valuation Office Field books are available for September 1839.

In 1841 the population of the townland was 32, of which 15 were males and 17 females. There were seven houses in the townland, all of which were inhabited.

In 1851 the population of the townland was 26, comprising 12 males and 14 females, the reduction being due to the Great Famine (Ireland). There were six houses in the townland, all were inhabited.

Griffith's Valuation of 1857 lists five landholders in the townland.

In 1861 the population of the townland was 25, comprising 11 males and 14 females. There were five houses in the townland and all were inhabited.

Three families were listed in the townland, both at the 1901 census of Ireland, and again at the time of the 1911 census of Ireland.

== Antiquities ==
1. Stepping Stones across the river
