= Corranierna (Corlough) =

Townland in County Cavan, Ireland

Corranierna (from Irish Corr an Iarna, meaning 'The Hill of the Hank or Skein of Thread') is a townland in the civil parish of Templeport, County Cavan, Ireland. It lies in the Roman Catholic parish of Corlough and barony of Tullyhaw.

== Geography ==
Corranierna is bounded on the west by Corraclassy and Gubnagree townlands, on the south by Derrynaslieve townland and on the east by Garvary (Corlough) and Derry Beg townlands. Its chief geographical features are the Owensallagh river (A source of the River Blackwater, County Cavan), forestry plantations and dug wells. Corranierna is traversed by minor public roads and rural lanes. The townland covers 60 statute acres.

== History ==
In earlier times the townland was probably uninhabited as it consists mainly of bog and poor clay soils. It was not seized by the English during the Plantation of Ulster in 1610 or in the Cromwellian Settlement of the 1660s so some dispossessed Irish families moved there and began to clear and farm the land.

The Tithe Applotment Books for 1826 list ten tithepayers in the townland.

The Ordnance Survey Name Books for 1836 give the following description of the townland- The soil is of a light boggy nature...The townland is bounded on the north by a large stream.

The Corranierna Valuation Office Field books are available for September 1839.

In 1841 the population of the townland was 15, being 8 males and 7 females. There were two houses in the townland, all of which were inhabited.

In 1851 the population of the townland was 4, being 3 males and 1 females, the reduction being due to the Great Famine (Ireland). There were two houses in the townland, one of which was uninhabited.

Griffith's Valuation of 1857 lists six landholders in the townland.

In 1861 the population of the townland was 11, being 4 males and 7 females. There were two houses in the townland and all were inhabited.

In the 1901 census of Ireland, there is one family listed in the townland.

In the 1911 census of Ireland, there are four families listed in the townland.

== Antiquities ==
1. A Lime-kiln
