= Brackley, Templeport =

Townland in the civil parish of Templeport, County Cavan, Ireland

Coordinates: 54.07514°N 7.810271°W

Brackley Breac Loch
- Townland
- Etymology: from Irish Breac Loch meaning 'Speckled Lake' or less likely Breaclaí meaning "Speckled Land"
- Location in Ireland
- Country: Ireland
- Province: Ulster
- County: County Cavan
- Barony: Tullyhaw
- Civil Parish: Templeport
- Roman Catholic Parish: Templeport
- Time zone: UTC+1 (IST)
  - Summer (DST): UTC+0 (GMT)

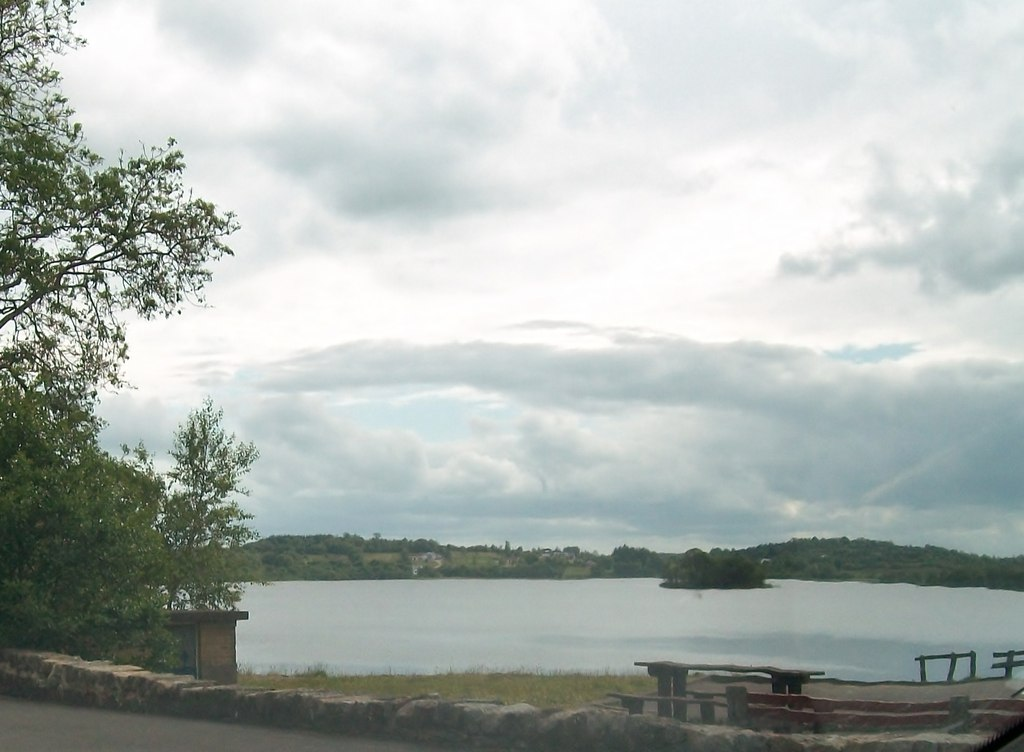
Brackley Lough, Templeport, County Cavan, Ireland

Brackley (from Irish Breac Loch meaning 'Speckled Lake' or less likely Breaclaí meaning "Speckled Land") is a townland in the civil parish of Templeport, County Cavan, Ireland. It lies in the Roman Catholic parish of Templeport and barony of Tullyhaw.

== Geography ==
Brackley is bounded on the north by Mullaghlea townland, on the west by Prospect, Corlough parish and Derrymony townlands, on the south by Killyneary, Carrick East and Gortnavreeghan townlands and on the east by Mullanacre Upper townland in Tomregan parish. Its chief geographical features are Slieve Rushen mountain on whose western slope it lies, Brackley Lough, mountain streams, mountain bogs, Brackley Wood, forestry plantations, stone quarries and dug wells. It forms part of the Slieve Rushen Bog Natural Heritage Area An island in Brackley Lough is called the Baron's Island after a Baron de Trent who lived in Brackley House c.1850 and who built a studio on the island. Brackley is traversed by the regional N87 road (Ireland) and rural lanes. The townland covers 619 statute acres.

== History ==
In medieval times the McGovern barony of Tullyhaw was divided into economic taxation areas called ballibetoes, from the Irish Baile Biataigh (Anglicized as 'Ballybetagh'), meaning 'A Provisioner's Town or Settlement'. The original purpose was to enable the farmer, who controlled the baile, to provide hospitality for those who needed it, such as poor people and travellers. The ballybetagh was further divided into townlands farmed by individual families who paid a tribute or tax to the head of the ballybetagh, who in turn paid a similar tribute to the clan chief. The steward of the ballybetagh would have been the secular equivalent of the erenagh in charge of church lands. There were seven ballibetoes in the parish of Templeport. Brackley was located in the ballybetagh of "Balleagheboynagh" (alias 'Ballyoghnemoynagh'). The original Irish is Baile Na Muighe Eanach, meaning 'The Town of the Marshy Plain'). The ballybetagh was also called "Aghawenagh", the original Irish is Achadh an Bhuí Eanaigh, meaning 'The Field of the Yellow Bog').

The 1609 Ulster Plantation Baronial Map depicts the townland as Brockl.

The 1652 Commonwealth Survey lists the townland as Bracklagh.

The 1665 Down Survey map depicts the townland as Bracklogh.

William Petty's 1685 map depicts it as Bracklough.

On 12 November 1590 Queen Elizabeth I of England granted a pardon (No. 5489) to Ferrall M'Gawran of Breachlaghe, gentleman for fighting against the Queen's forces. He was probably the same man who had already been pardoned on 19 January 1586 (No. 4813, Ferriell M'Manus M'Thomas Magawran of Killsollaghe), so he was still fighting against the English three years later. The said Farrell McGovern was the grandson of Tomás mac Maghnus Mág Samhradháin who was chief of the McGovern Clan from 1512 to 1532.

In the Plantation of Ulster by grant dated 26 June 1615, King James VI and I granted, inter alia, two polls in Bracklee to Sir George Graeme and Sir Richard Graeme to form part of the Manor of Greame. An Inquisition held at Cavan Town on 31 October 1627 found that George Greames was seized of one poll in Brackley and he died 9 October 1624. By his will dated 1 May 1615 he left his lands to his son and heir William Greames then 30 years old (born 1594) and unmarried.

The Grahams fought on the Irish side during the Irish Rebellion of 1641 and, as a result after the end of the war, the Cromwellian Act for the Settlement of Ireland 1652 confiscated their lands in Brackley and distributed them as follows-

The 1652 Commonwealth Survey lists the proprietor as being Mr Thomas Worsopp and the tenant being William Lawther, both of whom appear as proprietor and tenant for several other Templeport townlands in the same survey.

In the Hearth Money Rolls compiled on 29 September 1663 there were three Hearth Tax payers in Bracklagh- Hugh McBrien, Phelemy McBrien and Farrall McBrien.

A deed dated 9 December 1710 From Ralph Darling and Adam Darling (the sons of Richard Darling, one of the founders of Swanlinbar town) assigned, inter alia, one quarter of Bracklough poll and other lands bought from Sir Thomas Worsop, to Peter Ward, a merchant of Dublin.

By a deed dated 9 April 1711, the aforesaid Peter Ward granted, inter alia, his quarter of Bracklagh to Morley Saunders.

A lease dated 23 January 1717 from Morley Saunders to John Enery of Bawnboy includes that part of Bracklagh called Bonbegg, together with the other three-quarters of Bracklagh.

In the Templeport Poll Book of 1761 there were only three people registered to vote in Brockly in the 1761 Irish general election - Francis Dowler, John Dowler and John McGee. They were entitled to two votes each. The Dowlers both voted for Lord Newtownbutler (later Brinsley Butler, 2nd Earl of Lanesborough) who was elected Member of Parliament for Cavan County and for George Montgomery (MP) of Ballyconnell, who lost the election. McGee voted for Lord Newtownbutler (later Brinsley Butler, 2nd Earl of Lanesborough) who was elected Member of Parliament for Cavan County and for Barry Maxwell, 1st Earl of Farnham, who lost the election. Absence from the poll book either meant a resident did not vote or more likely was not a freeholder entitled to vote, which would mean most of the inhabitants of Brackley.

A lease dated 10 December 1774 from William Crookshank to John Enery of Bawnboy includes the lands of Brackley and Boonbegg. A further deed by John Enery dated 13 December 1774 includes the three poles of Brackley otherwise Bracklea.

The 1790 Cavan Carvaghs list spells the townland name as Bracklagh.

A lease dated 17 September 1816 John Enery of Bawnboy includes Brackley otherwise called the two Brackleys.

In the 1825 Registry of Freeholders for County Cavan there was one freeholder registered in Brackley- Michael Cassidy. He was a Forty-shilling freeholders holding a lease for lives from his landlord, Francis Finley.Registry of Freeholders in the county of Cavan

The Tithe Applotment Books for 1827 list nineteen tithepayers in the townland.

In 1833 two people in Brackley were registered as a keeper of weapons- Charles Carson and Launcelott Fiffe.

The Brackley Valuation Office Field books are available for 1839–1840.

Griffith's Valuation of 1857 lists thirty nine landholders in the townland.

On 12 June 1921, Dean John Finlay, a 78 year old Protestant clergyman, was shot dead in an IRA raid on his home at Brackley House.

== Brackley School ==
Brackley School was actually located in the townland of Mullaghlea, not Brackley.

== Census ==
Year	Population	Males	Females	Total Houses	Uninhabited
1841	170	90	80	31	2
1851	132	72	60	24	0
1861	122	66	56	20	0
1871	83	48	35	18	0
1881	84	44	40	20	4
1891	70	38	32	14	1

In the 1901 census of Ireland, there are fourteen families listed in the townland, and in the 1911 census of Ireland, there are thirteen families listed in the townland.

== Antiquities ==
The chief structures of historical interest in the townland are:

1. An earthen ringfort.
2. Brackley House
3. The site of the old Templeport Parochial Hall
4. Two flint scrapers and an iron wedge were found in the townland
