= Gubnagree =

Townland in County Cavan, Ireland

Gubnagree (from Irish Gub na Graí, meaning 'The Headland of the Horse Stud') is a townland in the civil parish of Templeport, County Cavan, Ireland. It lies in the Roman Catholic parish of Corlough and barony of Tullyhaw.

== Geography ==
Gubnagree is bounded on the north by Corraclassy townland, on the west by Corracholia Beg and Tullandreen townlands, on the south by Derryvella (Corlough) townland and on the east by Corranierna (Corlough) and Derrynaslieve townlands. Its chief geographical features are the Owensallagh river (A source of the River Blackwater, County Cavan), forestry plantations and small streams. Gubnagree is traversed by minor public roads and rural lanes. The townland covers 125 statute acres.

== History ==
In earlier times the townland was probably uninhabited as it consists mainly of bog and poor clay soils. It was not seized by the English during the Plantation of Ulster in 1610 or in the Cromwellian Settlement of the 1660s so some dispossessed Irish families moved there and began to clear and farm the land.

A map of the townland drawn in 1813 is in the National Archives of Ireland, Beresford Estate Maps, depicts the townland as Gubnagree. In the 19th century the landlord was Lord John Beresford, the Protestant Archbishop of Armagh. The muddled land history of the area prior to this is described in the 1838 Exchequer case, "Attorney General of Ireland v The Lord Primate".

The Tithe Applotment Books for 1826 list four tithepayers in the townland.

The Gubnagree Valuation Office Field books are available for September 1839.

In 1841 the population of the townland was 45 being 23 males and 22 females. There were six houses in the townland and all were inhabited.

In 1851 the population of the townland was 24 being 14 males and 10 females, the reduction being due to the Great Famine (Ireland). There were four houses in the townland and all were inhabited.

Griffith's Valuation of 1857 lists nine landholders in the townland.

In 1861 the population of the townland was 28, being 16 males and 12 females. There were five houses in the townland, of which one was uninhabited.

In 1871 the population of the townland was 26, being 15 males and 11 females. There were four houses in the townland, all were inhabited.

In 1881 the population of the townland was 29, being 15 males and 14 females. There were four houses in the townland, all were inhabited.

In 1891 the population of the townland was 31, being 16 males and 15 females. There were four houses in the townland, all were inhabited.

In the 1901 census of Ireland, there are five families listed in the townland.

In the 1911 census of Ireland, there are four families listed in the townland.

== Antiquities ==
There are no known antiquities in the townland
