= Eaglehill =

Townland in County Cavan, Ireland

Coordinates: 54°08′29″N 7°45′45″W

Eaglehill (from Irish Tulaigh Sceilp an Iolair, meaning 'The Hill of the Eagle’s Crag') is a townland in the civil parish of Templeport, County Cavan, Ireland. It lies in the Roman Catholic parish of Corlough and barony of Tullyhaw. The local pronunciation of the Gaelic name is 'Tully-Lug-Skiver-An-Erla'.

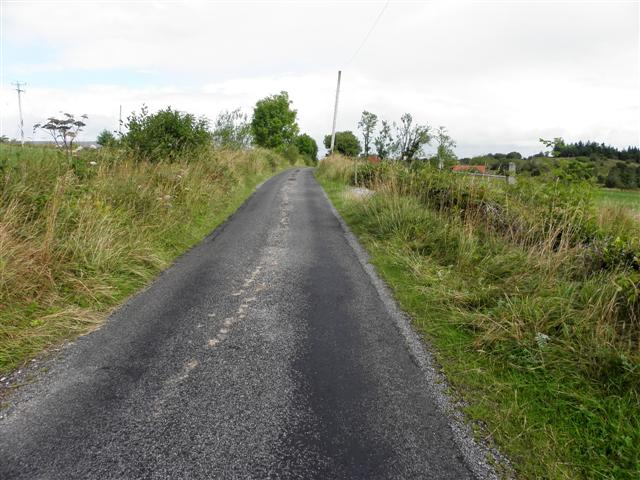
Eaglehill townland, Corlough parish, County Cavan, Ireland. Heading NNE towards Tullyandreen townland

== Geography ==
Eaglehill is bounded on the north by Tullyloughfin townland, on the west by Tullybrack townland and on the east by Tullandreen and Corracholia More townlands. Its chief geographical features are the Owensallagh river (A source of the River Blackwater, County Cavan), forestry plantations and a gravel pit. Eaglehill is traversed by minor public roads and rural lanes. The townland covers 104 statute acres.

== History ==
In earlier times the townland was probably uninhabited as it consists mainly of bog and poor clay soils. It was not seized by the English during the Plantation of Ulster in 1610 or in the Cromwellian Settlement of the 1660s so some dispossessed Irish families moved there and began to clear and farm the land.

A lease dated 17 September 1816 John Enery of Bawnboy includes Tullyscaravanerin.

The Tithe Applotment Books for 1826 list six tithe payers in the townland.

An 1827 lease from Finlay to Elliott includes Tullyscaravanerin.

The Ordnance Survey Name Books for 1836 give the following description of the townland- The townland is bounded on the north by a large mountain stream.

The Eaglehill Valuation Office Field books are available for September 1839.

In 1841 the population of the townland was 42, being 21 males and 21 females. There were nine houses in the townland, all of which were inhabited.

In 1851 the population of the townland was 36, being 17 males and 19 females, the reduction being due to the Great Famine (Ireland). There were six houses in the townland, all were inhabited.

Griffith's Valuation of 1857 lists six landholders in the townland.

In 1861 the population of the townland was 45, being 22 males and 23 females. There were seven houses in the townland and all were inhabited.

In the 1901 census of Ireland, there are nine families listed in the townland.

In the 1911 census of Ireland, there are seven families listed in the townland.

== Antiquities ==
There are no recorded antiquities in the townland
