= Moneynure =

Townland in County Cavan, Ireland

Coordinates: 54.07514°N 7.810271°W

Moneynure (from Irish: either Muine an Iúir meaning 'The Shrubbery of the Yew Tree' or Moinín Iúir meaning 'The Little Bog of the Yew Tree') is a townland in the civil parish of Templeport, County Cavan, Ireland. It lies in the Roman Catholic parish of Corlough and barony of Tullyhaw.

== Geography ==
Moneynure is bounded on the north by Derry More townland, on the west by Arderry and Derryconnessy townlands and on the east by Prospect, Corlough and Tirnawannagh townlands. Its chief geographical features are Brackley Lough and small streams. Moneynure is traversed by minor roads and rural lanes. The townland covers 91 statute acres.

== History ==
In medieval times the McGovern barony of Tullyhaw was divided into economic taxation areas called ballibetoes, from the Irish Baile Biataigh (Anglicized as 'Ballybetagh'), meaning 'A Provisioner's Town or Settlement'. The original purpose was to enable the farmer, who controlled the baile, to provide hospitality for those who needed it, such as poor people and travellers. The ballybetagh was further divided into townlands farmed by individual families who paid a tribute or tax to the head of the ballybetagh, who in turn paid a similar tribute to the clan chief. The steward of the ballybetagh would have been the secular equivalent of the erenagh in charge of church lands. There were seven ballibetoes in the parish of Templeport. Moneynure was located in the ballybetagh of Ballymackgonghan (Irish = Baile Mac Eochagain, meaning 'McEoghan's Town').

The 1652 Commonwealth Survey lists the name as Munenoore.

In the Plantation of Ulster by grant dated 24 February 1614, King James VI and I granted, inter alia, one pole of Monenoure to Phelim McHugh O'Reyly, Bryan McHugh O'Reyly and Cahir McHugh O'Reyly, the sons of Hugh Reyly, late of Ballaghaneo, County Cavan. Ballaghaneo is now the townland of Ballaghanea in Lurgan Parish, County Cavan, on the shores of Lough Ramor, so the O'Reillys were removed a long way from their home by the Plantation. Hugh Reyly was the great-grandnephew of the chief of the O'Reilly clan, Eoghan na Fésóige mac Seoain, who ruled from 1418–1449. The O’Reilly lands in Moneynure were confiscated in the Cromwellian Act for the Settlement of Ireland 1652 and were distributed as follows-

The 1652 Commonwealth Survey lists the proprietor as Captain Payne and the tenant as Daniell McConell.

A lease dated 31 January 1718 from Morley Saunders to John Enery of Bawnboy includes the lands of Moninure.

A lease dated 10 December 1774 from William Crookshank to John Enery of Bawnboy includes the lands of Moneynure, as does a further deed by John Enery dated 13 December 1774.

The 1790 Cavan Carvaghs list spells the name as Monerure.

A map of the townland drawn in 1813 is in the National Archives of Ireland, Beresford Estate Maps, depicts the townland as Moneymore and the proprietor as John Ennery.

A lease dated 17 September 1816 John Enery of Bawnboy includes Moneynure otherwise Monanure.

The Tithe Applotment Books for 1827 list seven tithepayers in the townland.

The Moneynure Valuation Office Field books are available for 1839-1840.

In 1841 the population of the townland was 33, being 17 males and 16 females. There were seven houses in the townland, all were inhabited.

In 1851 the population of the townland was 20, being 9 males and 11 females, the reduction being due to the Great Famine (Ireland). There were four houses in the townland, all inhabited.

Griffith's Valuation of 1857 lists eight landholders in the townland.

In 1861 the population of the townland was 20, being 8 males and 12 females. There were five houses in the townland and all were inhabited.

In 1871 the population of the townland was 20, being 13 males and 7 females. There were four houses in the townland and all were inhabited. (page 296 of census)

In 1881 the population of the townland was 18, being 11 males and 7 females. There were four houses in the townland, all were inhabited.

In 1891 the population of the townland was 15, being 10 males and 5 females. There were three houses in the townland, all were inhabited.

In the 1901 census of Ireland, there are three families listed in the townland, and in the 1911 census of Ireland, there are three families listed in the townland.

== Antiquities ==
1. A foot-bridge across the stream
2. The site of a 19th century cattle-pound
