= Derry More =

Townland in County Cavan, Ireland

Coordinates: 54.134°N 7.725°W

Derry More (from Irish Doire Mór meaning – The Big Oakwood) is a townland in the civil parish of Templeport, County Cavan, Ireland. It lies in the Roman Catholic parish of Corlough and barony of Tullyhaw.

== Geography ==
Derry More is bounded on the north by Derry Beg townland, on the west by Derryconnessy and Derrynaslieve townlands and on the east by Moneynure, Prospect, Corlough and Scrabby, Corlough townlands. Its chief geographical features are Brackley Lough, a stream and dug wells. Derry More is traversed by minor public roads and rural lanes. The townland covers 125 statute acres.

== History ==
In earlier times the townland was probably uninhabited as it consists mainly of bog and poor clay soils. It was not seized by the English during the Plantation of Ulster in 1610 or in the Cromwellian Settlement of the 1660s so some dispossessed Irish families moved there and began to clear and farm the land.

A map of the townland drawn in 1813 is in the National Archives of Ireland, Beresford Estate Maps, depicts the townland as Derrymore.

The Tithe Applotment Books for 1827 list twelve tithepayers in the townland.

The Derry More Valuation Office Field books are available for September 1839.

In 1841 the population of the townland was 38, being 13 males and 25 females. There were seven houses in the townland, all of which were inhabited.

In 1851 the population of the townland was 30, being 13 males and 17 females, the reduction being due to the Great Famine (Ireland). There were five houses in the townland, all were inhabited.

Griffith's Valuation of 1857 lists five landholders in the townland.

In 1861 the population of the townland was 24, being 9 males and 15 females. There were five houses in the townland and all were inhabited.

In the 1901 census of Ireland, there are four families listed in the townland, and in the 1911 census of Ireland, there are five families listed in the townland.

== Antiquities ==
1. A foot-bridge
2. Stepping Stones across the stream
