= Derryvahan =

Townland in the civil parish of Templeport, County Cavan, Ireland

Coordinates: 54.07514°N 7.810271°W

Derryvahan (from Irish Doire Mheathán meaning – The Oakwood of the Saplings) is a townland in the civil parish of Templeport, County Cavan, Ireland. It lies in the Roman Catholic parish of Corlough and barony of Tullyhaw.

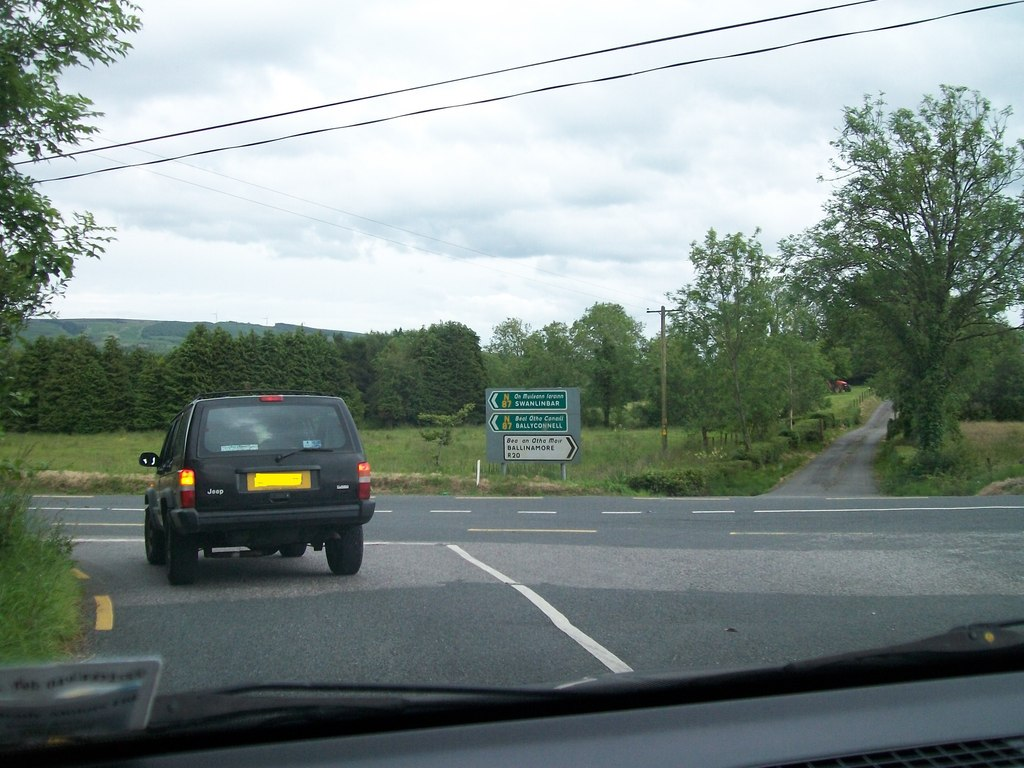
Derryvahan townland, Corlough parish, County Cavan, Ireland. The junction of the R200 and R202 roads

== Geography ==
Derryvahan is bounded on the north by Drumcar (Kinawley) townland, on the south by Garvary (Corlough) and Scrabby, Corlough townlands, on the west by Curraghabweehan and Drumbeagh townlands and on the east by Tawnagh and Derrynacreeve townlands. Its chief geographical features are the Owensallagh river (a source of the River Blackwater, County Cavan), a stream and dug wells. Derryvahan is traversed by the R202 road (Ireland), the R200 road and rural lanes. The townland covers 105 statute acres.

== History ==
In medieval times the McGovern barony of Tullyhaw was divided into economic taxation areas called ballibetoes, from the Irish Baile Biataigh (Anglicized as 'Ballybetagh'), meaning 'A Provisioner's Town or Settlement'. The original purpose was to enable the farmer, who controlled the baile, to provide hospitality for those who needed it, such as poor people and travellers. The ballybetagh was further divided into townlands farmed by individual families who paid a tribute or tax to the head of the ballybetagh, who in turn paid a similar tribute to the clan chief. The steward of the ballybetagh would have been the secular equivalent of the erenagh in charge of church lands. There were seven ballibetoes in the parish of Templeport. Derryvahan was located in the ballybetagh of "Bally Cloinelogh" (alias 'Bally Cloynelough'). The original Irish is Baile Cluain Loch, meaning 'The Town of the Lake Meadow')

In earlier times the townland was probably uninhabited as it consists mainly of bog and poor clay soils. It was not seized by the English during the Plantation of Ulster in 1610 or in the Cromwellian Settlement of the 1660s so some dispossessed Irish families moved there and began to clear and farm the land.

A map of the townland drawn in 1813 is in the National Archives of Ireland, Beresford Estate Maps; it depicts the townland as Derryvaghan or Derrynoghan.

The Tithe Applotment Books for 1827 list eight tithepayers in the townland.

The Derryvahan Valuation Office Field books are available for September 1839.

In 1841 the population of the townland was 44, being 20 males and 24 females. There were nine houses in the townland, of which one was uninhabited.

In 1851 the population of the townland was 48, being 23 males and 25 females. There were eight houses in the townland, all were inhabited.

Griffith's Valuation of 1857 lists nine landholders in the townland.

In 1861 the population of the townland was 47, including 24 males and 23 females. There were ten houses in the townland, of which nine were inhabited and one was in the course of erection.

In the 1901 census of Ireland, there are twelve families listed in the townland, and in the 1911 census of Ireland, there are eight families listed in the townland.

A description of Derryvahan in the 1930s by Brigid Josephine Mc Govern is available at

== Antiquities ==
There are no known antiquities in the townland.
