= Scrabby, Corlough =

Townland in the civil parish of Templeport, County Cavan, Ireland

Coordinates: 54.14°N 7.72°W

Scrabby Screabach (Irish)
- Townland
- Location in Ireland

Area
  - Total: 490 km^{2} (189 sq mi)

Scrabby (from Irish Screabach meaning Rough Uneven Land) is a townland in the civil parish of Templeport, County Cavan, Ireland. It lies in the Roman Catholic parish of Corlough and barony of Tullyhaw.

== Geography ==
Scrabby is bounded on the north by Derryvahan and Tawnagh townlands, on the south by Derry More townland, on the west by Derry Beg and Garvary (Corlough) townlands and on the east by Prospect, Corlough townland. Its chief geographical features are Brackley Lough, small streams, spring wells and dug wells. Scrabby is traversed by minor public roads and rural lanes. The townland covers 189 statute acres.

== History ==
In medieval times the McGovern barony of Tullyhaw was divided into economic taxation areas called ballibetoes, from the Irish Baile Biataigh (Anglicized as 'Ballybetagh'), meaning 'A Provisioner's Town or Settlement'. The original purpose was to enable the farmer, who controlled the baile, to provide hospitality for those who needed it, such as poor people and travellers. The ballybetagh was further divided into townlands farmed by individual families who paid a tribute or tax to the head of the ballybetagh, who in turn paid a similar tribute to the clan chief. The steward of the ballybetagh would have been the secular equivalent of the erenagh in charge of church lands. There were seven ballibetoes in the parish of Templeport. Scrabby was located in the ballybetagh of "Bally Cloinelogh" (alias 'Bally Cloynelough'). The original Irish is Baile Cluain Loch, meaning 'The Town of the Lake Meadow')

The 1609 Ulster Plantation Baronial Map depicts the townland as part of Gortatawill. (Irish name, either Gort an Tuathail meaning 'The Field facing away from the Sun' or Gort an Eochaille meaning "The Field of the Yew Wood".)

The 1665 Down Survey map depicts Scrabby as Sheribagh and Renbeg. The southern part of the townland jutting into Brackley Lough was called Rinnbeg meaning 'The Small Promontory'. Rinnbeg was also called Gorteenboy.

William Petty’s 1685 map of Cavan depicts it as Sheribagh and Renbeg.

In the Plantation of Ulster by grant dated 29 April 1611, King James VI and I granted the town and lands of Gortatowill containing 6 polls, comprising a total of 300 acres at an annual rent of £3-4s., to Mulmore McHugh McFarrall O'Rely, gent. Mulmore O'Reilly was the grandson of the chief of the O'Reilly clan, Fearghal macSeaán, who ruled East Breifne from 1526–1534. His genealogy is Maol Mórdha son of Aodh son of Fearghal son of Seaán son of Cathal son of Eóghan na Fésóige. Mulmore O'Reilly had four sons by his wife Honora- Émonn, Hugh O'Reilly (Archbishop of Armagh) (b. 1580, d. 1653), Fearghal and Domhnall. He also had an illegitimate son, Cathaoir. Mulmore died sometime between 1611 and 1637. He left his lands in Tawnagh to his son Émonn (Edmund) O'Reilly. Émonn had three sons, Aodh (Hugh), Cathal and Brian. An Inquisition held in Cavan Town on 12 September 1638 found that the said Edm’ Relly recently of Gortetowell in Co. Cavan, in his life, was seised of a poll of land called Tawnagh, and of a poll called Carrick in said county. The said Edmund died on 29 September 1637. Hugh O’Reyly, his son and heir has reached his maturity and now holds the land from the king in free and common socage. Catherine Newgent, alias Reily, was the wife of the said Edmund and the aforesaid Catherine is dower of the premises. At the outbreak of the Irish Rebellion of 1641 Hugh O'Reilly still held the townland according to the Books of Survey and Distribution. Hugh O'Reilly had two sons, Émonn and Phillip. Hugh's son Émonn had one son Sémus.

The aforesaid O’Reilly lands in Scrabby were confiscated in the Cromwellian Act for the Settlement of Ireland 1652. In 1657 A list of the Papist Proprietors names in the County of Cavan, as they are returned in the Civill Surveys of the said County gave the names of 20 landowners whose property was confiscated in the barony of Tullyhaw. These included Hugh O'Rely whose lands were distributed as follows-

In the Hearth Money Rolls compiled on 29 September 1663 there were seven taxpayers in Gartetoill- Thomas Magawran of Gartetoill, John Graham of the same, Tirlagh McKelagher of the same, Hugh McBrien of the same, Owen McKelacher of the same, Edmond O Helicke of the same and Hugh McGawran of the same.

The 1652 Commonwealth Survey lists the townland as Skebby and Ranbeg and Gorteenboy with the proprietor as Lieutenant-Colonel Tristram Beresford and the tenants as William Chambers and others. A grant dated 3 November 1666 was made by King Charles II of England to the aforesaid Sir Tristram Beresford, 1st Baronet which included, inter alia, the lands of Scirbagh and Rendbegg. By grant dated 11 September 1670 from King Charles II of England to said Sir Tristram Beresford, the said lands of Scirbagh and Rendbegg were included in the creation of a new Manor of Beresford. Beresford then leased the land to John Graham who was in possession in 1676. In 1683 Robert Barry was the tenant. In 1696 Robert Saunders (Irish lawyer), one of the founders of the village of Swanlinbar, became the tenant. On 13 March 1706 Marcus Beresford, 1st Earl of Tyrone leased the lands of Scrabagh alias Sherefbagh to the said Robert Saunders, for a term of 99 years. His son later sold his leasehold interest to Colonel John Enery of Bawnboy. Deeds, tenant lists etc. relating to Scrabby from 1650 onwards are available at- Advanced search – The National Archives of Ireland by searching for 'Derryvella'.

The 1690 list of outlawed Irish Jacobites in County Cavan includes John Graham and Thomas Graham of Gortatole, gents. John Graham was probably the man named in the Hearth Money Rolls above or his son.

The will of Philip Fitzpatrick of Gratetowel is dated 30 July 1735.

The 1790 Cavan Carvaghs list spells the name as Skrebagh and Gortneyboy alias Rinbeg.

A map of the townland drawn in 1813 is in the National Archives of Ireland, Beresford Estate Maps, depicts the townland as Scribogue or Scrabby.

The Tithe Applotment Books for 1827 list fourteen tithepayers in the townland.

The 1836 Ordnance survey Namebooks state- Contains 191 acres of which 113 are cultivated, 16 of water, 19 of rough uncultivated pasture and 3 of bog...Soil inclines to clay and is intermixed with lime & sandstone boulders...The townland is bounded on the south side by a large lake.

In the 19th century the landlord was Lord John Beresford, the Protestant Archbishop of Armagh. The muddled land history of the area prior to this is described in the 1838 Exchequer case, "Attorney General of Ireland v The Lord Primate".

The Scrabby Valuation Office Field books are available for 1839-1840.

In 1841 the population of the townland was 76, being 30 males and 46 females. There were thirteen houses in the townland, all were inhabited.

In 1851 the population of the townland was 75, being 32 males and 43 females, the reduction being due to the Great Famine (Ireland). There were twelve houses in the townland, of which one was uninhabited.

Griffith's Valuation of 1857 lists twenty-three landholders in the townland.

In 1861 the population of the townland was 59, being 32 males and 27 females. There were ten houses in the townland and all were inhabited.

In 1871 the population of the townland was 53, being 23 males and 30 females. There were ten houses in the townland and all were inhabited.(page 296 of census)

In 1881 the population of the townland was 44, being 18 males and 26 females. There were eleven houses in the townland, one of which was uninhabited.

In 1891 the population of the townland was 41, being 19 males and 22 females. There were nine houses in the townland, of which one was uninhabited.

In the 1901 census of Ireland, there are eight families listed in the townland, and in the 1911 census of Ireland, there are ten families listed in the townland.

A description of Scrabby in the 1930s by John Duffy is available online.

== Antiquities ==
1. A crannog in Brackley Lough.
2. The site of Scrabby hedge-school. The Second Report from the Commissioners of Irish Education Inquiry, 1826 lists the headmaster of Scraby (sic) school as Owen Kellagher, a Roman Catholic. There were 32 Roman Catholic and 20 Protestant pupils of which 33 were boys and 19 girls. The schoolhouse was described as ‘bad’ and cost £6 to be erected. Bawnboy and Templeport History Heritage and Folklore - Past and Present
3. A lime kiln

== See also ==
- Hugh O'Reilly (Archbishop of Armagh)
