= Tirnawannagh =

Townland in County Cavan, Ireland

Coordinates: 54.07514°N 7.810271°W

Tirnawannagh (from Irish "Tír na Bhfána", meaning 'Countryside of the Slopes') is a townland in the civil parish of Templeport, County Cavan, Ireland. It lies in the Roman Catholic parish of Corlough and barony of Tullyhaw.

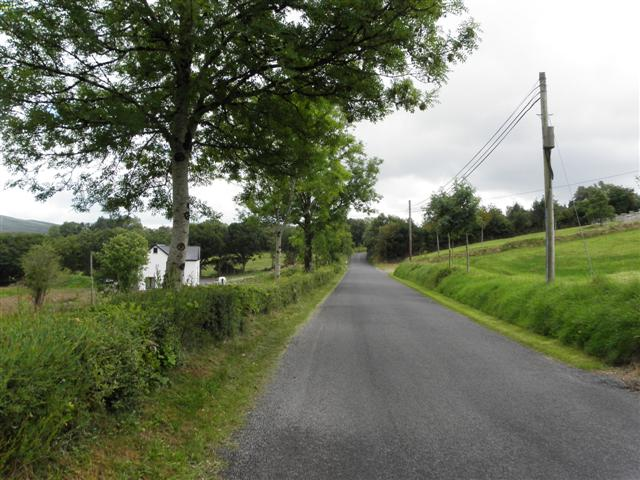
Tirnawannagh townland, Corlough parish, County Cavan, Ireland. Heading ESE

== Geography ==
Tirnawannagh is bounded on the north by Prospect, Corlough townland, on the south by Teeboy and Gortnacargy townlands, on the west by Arderry and Moneynure townlands and on the east by Derrymony and Erraran townlands. Its chief geographical features are Brackley Lough, Bunerky Lough (Irish = Loch Bun Adhairc = The Lake of the Butt of the Horn), Lough Namoyle (Loch na Maoile = The Lake of the Bare Hill), forestry plantations, small streams, a spring and dug wells. Tirnawannagh is traversed by minor public roads and rural lanes. The townland covers 340 statute acres.

== History ==
In medieval times the McGovern barony of Tullyhaw was divided into economic taxation areas called ballibetoes, from the Irish Baile Biataigh (Anglicized as 'Ballybetagh'), meaning 'A Provisioner's Town or Settlement'. The original purpose was to enable the farmer, who controlled the baile, to provide hospitality for those who needed it, such as poor people and travellers. The ballybetagh was further divided into townlands farmed by individual families who paid a tribute or tax to the head of the ballybetagh, who in turn paid a similar tribute to the clan chief. The steward of the ballybetagh would have been the secular equivalent of the erenagh in charge of church lands. There were seven ballibetoes in the parish of Templeport. Tirnawannagh was located in the ballybetagh of Bally Gortnekargie (Irish "Gort na Carraige", meaning 'The Field of the Rock').

The 1609 Ulster Plantation Baronial Map depicts the townland as part of Gortnacargie (now the modern townland of Gortnacargy in Corlough parish).

The 1665 Down Survey map depicts it as Terrynownagh.

William Petty's 1685 map depicts the townland as Terenowna.

In the Plantation of Ulster by grant dated 27 February 1610, King James VI and I granted the lands of Gortnekargie containing 4 polls, Dowrie containing 1 poll and Corneha containing 1 poll comprising a total of 300 acres at an annual rent of £3-4s., to John O’Reily and Connor O’Reily, gentlemen. John O’Reily and Connor O’Reily seem to be the great-great-grandsons of the chief of the O'Reilly clan, Eamón mac Maolmórdha O’Reilly of Kilnacrott, who ruled East Breifne from October 1596 – 1601. Their genealogy is Conchobhar & Seaán sons of Cathaoir Óg son of Aodh son of Cathaoir son of Eamón of Kilnacrott son of Maolmórdha son of Seaán son of Cathal.

By a deed dated 10 May 1611 between the said Connor McCahir O’Relly of Cargeagh-Callne in County Cavan, gent and John O’Relly of Gortingarge, County Cavan, gent by which they divide between them the 6 poules of land gotten at the last Plantation of the county, viz, the poules of Gortinesimonie, Tirenavan, Dinrewelle, Dune, Dongary and Cornahagh, of which Connor obtained the three first; who is to pay John 10 shillings English yearly in satisfaction of a gallon of land.

An Inquisition held at Cavan Town on 31 March 1626 found that the said Cornelius O’Rely, recently of Gortincarge, County Cavan deceased, was seized of said townland of Gortincarge containing 4 polls of land, namely Gortinshemore, Downe and Tyrenewonagh and 2 polls of land in Downe and Corneha. He died on 3 November 1625. His daughter and heir Mor O’Rely was then 15 years old and married.

The aforesaid O'Reilly lands in Tirnawannagh were confiscated in the Cromwellian Act for the Settlement of Ireland 1652 and were distributed as follows-

The 1652 Commonwealth Survey depicts the townland as Teernenooan with the proprietor being Lieutenant-Colonel Tristram Beresford.

A deed dated 13 Nov 1738 includes: Teernannanagh.

The 1790 Cavan Carvaghs list spells the name as Teernevanagh.

The Tithe Applotment Books for 1827 list fourteen tithepayers in the townland.

The Tirnawannagh Valuation Office Field books are available for October 1839.

In 1841 the population of the townland was 131, being 56 males and 75 females. There were twenty-two houses in the townland, all were inhabited.

In 1851 the population of the townland was 72, being 34 males and 38 females, the reduction being due to the Great Famine (Ireland). There were seventeen houses in the townland, all inhabited.

Griffith's Valuation of 1857 lists twenty-two landholders in the townland.

In 1861 the population of the townland was 74, being 37 males and 37 females. There were sixteen houses in the townland and all were inhabited.

In 1871 the population of the townland was 74, being 35 males and 39 females. There were sixteen houses in the townland and all were inhabited.(page 296 of census)

In 1881 the population of the townland was 76, being 35 males and 41 females. There were twelve houses in the townland, all were inhabited.

In 1891 the population of the townland was 64, being 29 males and 35 females. There were twelve houses in the townland, all were inhabited.

In the 1901 census of Ireland, there are fifteen families listed in the townland, and in the 1911 census of Ireland, there are fourteen families listed in the townland.
