= Prospect, Corlough =

Townland in the civil parish of Templeport, County Cavan, Ireland

Coordinates: 54.07514°N 7.810271°W

Prospect Renmore or Rinn Mór
- Townland
- Location within Ireland
- Country: Ireland
- Province: Ulster
- County: Cavan
- Civil parish: Templeport
- Roman Catholic parish: Corlough
- Barony: Tullyhaw

Area
  - Total: 0.92 km^{2} (0.36 sq mi)
- Time zone: GMT

Prospect (Modern English name meaning ‘An extensive view of landscape’ because of the fine view it gives over Brackley Lough from Prospect Point at the southern tip of the townland. The old Irish place name was "Renmore or Rinn Mór" meaning the 'Big Promontory or Headland') is a townland in the civil parish of Templeport, County Cavan, Ireland. It lies in the Roman Catholic parish of Corlough and barony of Tullyhaw.

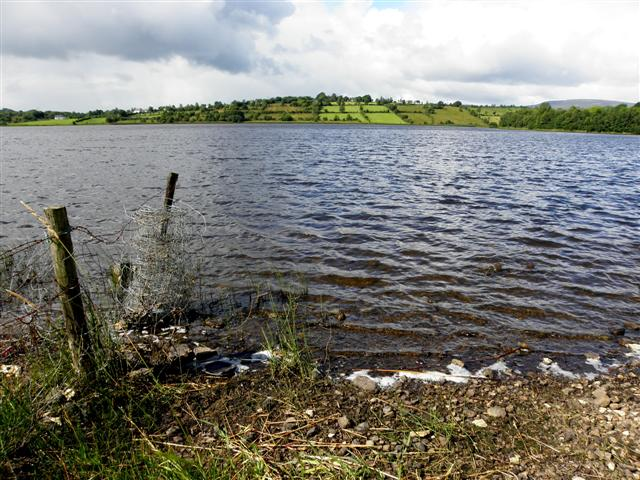
Prospect townland, Corlough parish, County Cavan, Ireland. Looking west over Brackley Lough

== Geography ==
Prospect is bounded on the north by Tawnagh townland, on the south by Moneynure and Tirnawannagh townlands, on the west by Derry More and Scrabby, Corlough townlands and on the east by Brackley, Templeport, Mullaghlea and Derrymony townlands. Its chief geographical features are Brackley Lough, small streams, quarries, sinkholes and dug wells. Prospect is traversed by minor public road and rural lanes. The townland covers 227 statute acres.

== History ==
In medieval times the McGovern barony of Tullyhaw was divided into economic taxation areas called ballibetoes, from the Irish Baile Biataigh (Anglicized as 'Ballybetagh'), meaning 'A Provisioner's Town or Settlement'. The original purpose was to enable the farmer, who controlled the baile, to provide hospitality for those who needed it, such as poor people and travellers. The ballybetagh was further divided into townlands farmed by individual families who paid a tribute or tax to the head of the ballybetagh, who in turn paid a similar tribute to the clan chief. The steward of the ballybetagh would have been the secular equivalent of the erenagh in charge of church lands. There were seven ballibetoes in the parish of Templeport. Prospect was located in the ballybetagh of "Bally Cloinelogh" (alias 'Bally Cloynelough'). The original Irish is Baile Cluain Loch, meaning 'The Town of the Lake Meadow')

The 1609 Ulster Plantation Baronial Map depicts the townland as part of Gortatawill. (Irish name, either Gort an Tuathail meaning 'The Field facing away from the Sun' or Gort an Eochaille meaning "The Field of the Yew Wood".)

The 1665 Down Survey map depicts Prospect as Renmore.

William Petty's 1685 map of Cavan depicts the townland as Renmore.

In the Plantation of Ulster by grant dated 29 April 1611, King James VI and I granted the town and lands of Gortatowill containing 6 polls, comprising a total of 300 acres at an annual rent of £3-4s., to Mulmore McHugh McFarrall O'Rely, gent. Mulmore O'Reilly had been dispossessed of his lands in the townland of Aghaweely Lower in the parish of Ballintemple. He was the grandson of the chief of the O'Reilly clan, Fearghal macSeaán, who ruled East Breifne from 1526–1534. His genealogy is Maol Mórdha son of Aodh son of Fearghal son of Seaán son of Cathal son of Eóghan na Fésóige. Mulmore O'Reilly had four sons by his wife Honora- Émonn, Hugh O'Reilly (Archbishop of Armagh) (b. 1580, d. 1653), Fearghal and Domhnall. He also had an illegitimate son, Cathaoir. Mulmore died sometime between 1611 and 1637. He left his lands in Tawnagh to his son Émonn (Edmund) O'Reilly. Émonn had three sons, Aodh (Hugh), Cathal and Brian. An Inquisition held in Cavan Town on 12 September 1638 found that the said Edm’ Relly recently of Gortetowell in Co. Cavan, in his life, was seised of a poll of land called Tawnagh, and of a poll called Carrick in said county. The said Edmund died on 29 September 1637. Hugh O’Reyly, his son and heir has reached his maturity and now holds the land from the king in free and common socage. Catherine Newgent, alias Reily, was the wife of the said Edmund and the aforesaid Catherine is dower of the premises. At the outbreak of the Irish Rebellion of 1641 Hugh O'Reilly still held the townland according to the Books of Survey and Distribution. Hugh O'Reilly had two sons, Émonn and Phillip. Hugh's son Émonn had one son Sémus.

The aforesaid O’Reilly lands in Prospect were confiscated in the Cromwellian Act for the Settlement of Ireland 1652. In 1657 A list of the Papist Proprietors names in the County of Cavan, as they are returned in the Civill Surveys of the said County gave the names of 20 landowners whose property was confiscated in the barony of Tullyhaw. These included Hugh O'Rely whose lands were distributed as follows-

The 1652 Commonwealth Survey spells the townland as Ranmore and lists the proprietor as Lieutenant-Colonel Tristram Beresford with the tenants as William Chambers & others. A grant dated 3 November 1666 was made by King Charles II of England to aforesaid Sir Tristram Beresford, 1st Baronet which included, inter alia, the lands of Renmoor. By grant dated 11 September 1670 from King Charles II of England to said Sir Tristram Beresford, the said lands of Renmoor were included in the creation of a new Manor of Beresford. Beresford then leased the land to John Graham. On 13 March 1706 Marcus Beresford, 1st Earl of Tyrone leased the land of Renmore to Robert Saunders (Irish lawyer), one of the founders of the village of Swanlinbar, for a term of 99 years. Saunders' son Morley later sold his leasehold interest to Colonel John Enery of Bawnboy. Deeds, tenant lists etc. relating to Prospect from 1650 onwards are available at- Advanced Search | The National Archives of Ireland by searching for 'Derryvella'.

In the Hearth Money Rolls compiled on 29 September 1663 there were seven taxpayers in Gartetoill- Thomas Magawran of Gartetoill, John Graham of the same, Tirlagh McKelagher of the same, Hugh McBrien of the same, Owen McKelacher of the same, Edmond O Helicke of the same and Hugh McGawran of the same.

The 1690 list of outlawed Irish Jacobites in County Cavan includes John Graham and Thomas Graham of Gortatole, gents. John Graham was probably the man named in the Hearth Money Rolls above or his son.

The will of Philip Fitzpatrick of Gratetowel is dated 30 July 1735.

The 1790 Cavan Carvaghs list spells the name as Rynmore.

A map of the townland drawn in 1813 is in the National Archives of Ireland, Beresford Estate Maps, depicts the townland as Prospect, with a sub-division to the south named Rinn Wood (a remnant from the original name of the townland- Renmore).

The Tithe Applotment Books for 1827 list seventeen tithepayers in the townland.

The 1836 Ordnance survey Namebooks state- The townland is bounded on the south side by a large lake. There is plenty of limestone on the land which is burned & used for manure.

In the 19th century the landlord was Lord John Beresford, the Protestant Archbishop of Armagh. The muddled land history of the area prior to this is described in the 1838 Exchequer case, "Attorney General of Ireland v The Lord Primate".

The Prospect Valuation Office Field books are available for September 1839.

Griffith's Valuation of 1857 lists seven landholders in the townland.

There is a poem composed by Philip King of Prospect on the death of his sister Máire Nic Conraoi, entitled Máire Dheas Nic Conraoi (viewable online at JSTOR).

== Census ==
Year	Population	Males	Females	Total Houses	Uninhabited
1841	34	16	18	5	1
1851	30	10	20	5	0
1861	32	16	16	7	0
1871	27	13	14	6	0
1881	20	10	10	5	0
1891	19	9	10	5	1

In the 1901 census of Ireland, there are six families listed in the townland, and in the 1911 census of Ireland, there are five families listed in the townland.

== Antiquities ==
1. A crannog in Brackley Lough, described in the 1995 'Archaeological Inventory of County Cavan' (Site no. 1594) as- Small almost circular tree-covered island (diam c. 20m) in Brackley Lough, c. 320m from the shoreline. Modern landing place at NE of island.
2. A lime-kiln

== See also ==
- Hugh O'Reilly (Archbishop of Armagh)
