= Drumbeagh =

Townland in Cavan County, Ireland

Coordinates: 54.154°N 7.739°W

Drumbeagh (from Irish Droim Beitheach meaning The Hillridge of the Birches) is a townland in the civil parish of Templeport, County Cavan, Ireland. It lies in the Roman Catholic parish of Corlough and barony of Tullyhaw.

== Geography ==
Drumbeagh is bounded on the north by Gubrawully townland, on the west by Altinure, Tullandreen, Tullynamoltra and Corraclassy townlands and on the east by Curraghabweehan, Derryvahan and Drumcar (Kinawley) townlands. Its chief geographical features are the Owensallagh river (A source of the River Blackwater, County Cavan), forestry plantations, a stream and dug wells. Drumbeagh is traversed by the R200 road (Ireland) and rural lanes. The townland covers 187 statute acres.

== History ==
In the Plantation of Ulster by grant dated 27 February 1610, along with other lands, King James VI and I granted one poll of Drombeagh and Corroboan to William O'Shereden, gentleman, Cheefe of his Name. William Sheridan was the chief of the Sheridan Clan in County Cavan. He was the son of the previous chief, Hugh Duff O'Sheridan of Togher townland, Kilmore parish, County Cavan. William was the ancestor of the famous Sheridan theatrical family. William died sometime before 1638 leaving two sons, Owen (of Mullaghmore, Tullyhunco) and Patrick (of Raleagh townland, Kildallan parish). Owen Sheridan succeeded to his father's lands. Owen's son Denis was born in 1612 and became a Catholic priest in charge of Kildrumferton parish, County Cavan. He later converted to Protestantism and on 10 June 1634 William Bedell, the Protestant Bishop of Kilmore, ordained him as a Minister of the Church of Ireland and two days later Denis was collated to the Vicarage of Killasser in the Diocese of Kilmore. Denis had several children, including William Sheridan (Bishop of Kilmore and Ardagh) 1682-1691 (his son Donald kept up the Templeport connection by marrying Mrs Enery of Bawnboy); Patrick Sheridan, Cloyne, Protestant Bishop of Cloyne (1679-1682) and Sir Thomas Sheridan (politician) Chief Secretary of State for Ireland (1687-1688).

The Sheridan lands in Drumbeagh were confiscated in the Cromwellian Act for the Settlement of Ireland 1652 and were distributed as follows:

The 1652 Commonwealth Survey lists the townland as Drombeagh and the proprietor as Lieutenant-Colonel Tristram Beresford. A further confirming grant dated 3 November 1666 was made by King Charles II of England to the aforementioned Sir Tristram Beresford, 1st Baronet included, inter alia, 76 acres and 3 roods in Curraghboghan and Drumbeagh. By grant dated 11 September 1670 from King Charles II of England to said Sir Tristram Beresford, the lands of Curraghbegan and Drumbeagh were included in the creation of a new Manor of Beresford.

A deed dated 30 April 1740 by Thomas Enery includes: Drombeagh.

A deed by Arthur Ellis dated 19 Mar 1768 includes the lands of Drumbeagh.

A deed by Gore Ellis dated 24 Feb 1776 includes the lands of Drumbeagh.

The 1790 Cavan Carvaghs list spells the name as Drombeagh.

A map of the townland drawn in 1813 is in the National Archives of Ireland, Beresford Estate Maps, depicts the townland as Drumbaugh.

The Tithe Applotment Books for 1827 list ten tithepayers in the townland.

The Drumbeagh Valuation Office Field books are available for September 1839.

In 1841 the population of the townland was 87, being 47 males and 40 females. There were fifteen houses in the townland, all of which were inhabited.

In 1851 the population of the townland was 82, being 47 males and 35 females, the reduction being due to the Great Famine (Ireland). There were fifteen houses in the townland, all were inhabited.

Griffith's Valuation of 1857 lists twenty-three landholders in the townland.

In 1861 the population of the townland was 68, being 34 males and 34 females. There were fourteen houses in the townland and all were inhabited.

In the 1901 census of Ireland, there are seven families listed in the townland, and in the 1911 census of Ireland there are eleven families listed in the townland.

There is a description of Drumbeagh in the 1930s from Emily Montgomery's collection.

A distinguished native of the townland was Father Francis McSpiritt.

== Antiquities ==
1. The Corraclassy 110kV Electricity Substation
2. A lime-kiln
3. Stepping Stones across a stream
4. The site of Drumbeagh Hedge School in Cox’s Lane. The teachers were Cox and Maginnis. The Second Report from the Commissioners of Irish Education Inquiry, 1826 lists the headmaster of Drumbeagh school as James Magennis. There were 64 pupils of which 39 were boys and 25 girls. The schoolhouse was described as Bad and cost £7 to be erected.
