= Tullandreen =

Townland in the civil parish of Templeport, County Cavan, Ireland

- Townland
- Interactive map of Tullandreen
- Country: Ireland

Tullandreen (from Irish Tulaigh an Draighin, meaning 'The Hill of the Blackthorn') is a townland in the civil parish of Templeport, County Cavan, Ireland. It lies in the Roman Catholic parish of Corlough and barony of Tullyhaw. The local pronunciation is Tulleanderreen.

== Geography ==
Tullandreen is bounded on the north by Drumbeagh and Tullynamoltra townlands, on the south by Corracholia More and Corracholia Beg townlands, on the west by Eaglehill and Tullyloughfin townlands and on the east by Corraclassy and Gubnagree townlands. Its chief geographical features are the Owensallagh river (A source of the River Blackwater, County Cavan), forestry plantations, gravel pits and dug wells. Tullandreen is traversed by minor public roads and rural lanes. The townland covers 115 statute acres.

== History ==
In earlier times the townland was probably uninhabited as it consists mainly of bog and poor clay soils. It was not seized by the English during the Plantation of Ulster in 1610 or in the Cromwellian Settlement of the 1660s so some dispossessed Irish families moved there and began to clear and farm the land.

A map of the townland drawn in 1813 is in the National Archives of Ireland, Beresford Estate Maps, depicts the townland as Tullinderreen.

The Tithe Applotment Books for 1827 list two tithepayers in the townland.

The Ordnance Survey Name Books for 1836 give the following description of the townland- The townland is bounded on the north and east side by a large stream.

The Tullandreen Valuation Office Field books are available for September 1839.

In 1841 the population of the townland was 22, being 12 males and 10 females. There were three houses in the townland, all were inhabited.

In 1851 the population of the townland was 24, being 15 males and 9 females. There were three houses in the townland, all inhabited.

Griffith's Valuation of 1857 lists six landholders in the townland.

In 1861 the population of the townland was 21, being 11 males and 10 females. There were three houses in the townland and all were inhabited.

In 1871 the population of the townland was 20, being 10 males and 10 females. There were three houses in the townland and all were inhabited.(page 296 of census)

In 1881 the population of the townland was 20, being 8 males and 12 females. There were four houses in the townland, all were inhabited.

In 1891 the population of the townland was 30, being 13 males and 17 females. There were four houses in the townland, all were inhabited.

In the 1901 census of Ireland, there are five families listed in the townland.

In the 1911 census of Ireland, there are four families listed in the townland.

== Antiquities ==
1. A foot-bridge over the stream
