= Derry Beg =

Townland in County Cavan, Ireland

Derry Beg (from Irish Doire Beag, meaning 'The Little Oakwood') is a townland in the civil parish of Templeport, County Cavan, Ireland. It lies in the Roman Catholic parish of Corlough and barony of Tullyhaw.

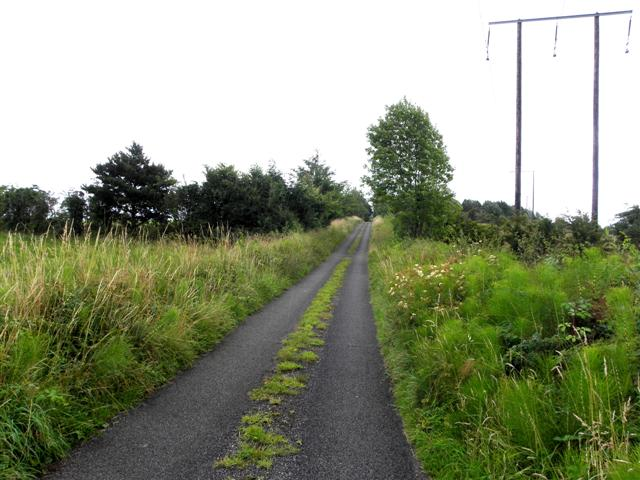
Road at Derry Beg townland, Corlough parish, County Cavan, Ireland. Heading south-east to Derry More townland

== Geography ==
Derry Beg is bounded on the west by Corranierna (Corlough) and Derrynaslieve townlands, on the north by Garvary (Corlough) townland and on the east by Derry More and Scrabby, Corlough townlands. Its chief geographical features are Brackley Lough, a stream, spring wells and dug wells. Derry Beg is traversed by the R202 road (Ireland) and rural lanes. The townland covers 113 statute acres.

== History ==
In earlier times the townland was probably uninhabited as it consists mainly of bog and poor clay soils. It was not seized by the English during the Plantation of Ulster in 1610 or in the Cromwellian Settlement of the 1660s so some dispossessed Irish families moved there and began to clear and farm the land.

An 1813 map depicts the townland as Derrybeg.

The Tithe Applotment Books for 1827 list eight tithepayers in the townland.

The 1836 Ordnance Survey Namebooks describe the townland as- The soil is light yellow clay, intermixed with boulders of sandstone.

The Derry Beg Valuation Office Field books are available for September 1839.

In 1841 the population of the townland was 54, being 26 males and 28 females. There were nine houses in the townland, of which one was uninhabited.

In 1851 the population of the townland was 44, being 19 males and 25 females, the reduction being due to the Great Famine (Ireland). There were seven houses in the townland, all were inhabited.

Griffith's Valuation of 1857 lists seven landholders in the townland.

In 1861 the population of the townland was 46, being 20 males and 26 females. There were nine houses in the townland and all were inhabited.

In the 1901 census of Ireland, there are five families listed in the townland, and in the 1911 census of Ireland, there are eight families listed in the townland.

== Antiquities ==
There are no antiquities in the townland
