= Tullynamoltra =

Townland in County Cavan, Ireland

Tullynamoltra (from Irish Tulaigh na Molltrach, meaning 'The Hill of the Heaps') is a townland in the civil parish of Templeport, County Cavan, Ireland. It lies in the Roman Catholic parish of Corlough and barony of Tullyhaw. The local pronunciation is tully-na-MOIL-tra.

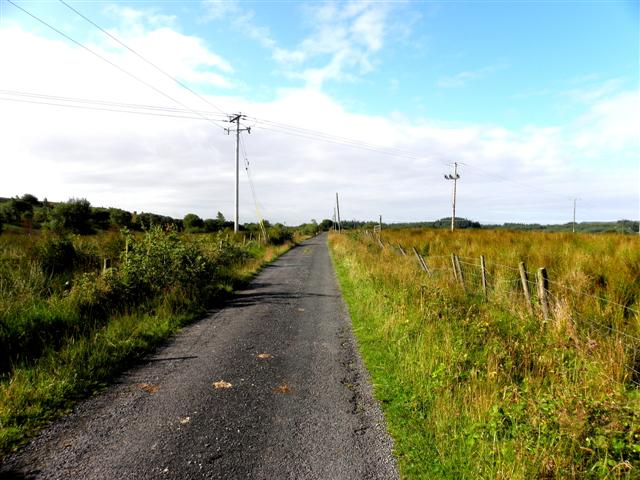
Tullynamoltra townland, Corlough parish, County Cavan, Ireland. Heading SSW

== Geography ==
Tullynamoltra is surrounded by townlands; on the north by Altinure, to the west by Altachullion Upper and Tullyloughfin, to the south by Tullandreen, and on the eastern side by Drumbeagh. Its chief geographical features are the Owensallagh River (A source of the River Blackwater, County Cavan) and dug wells. Tullynamoltra is traversed by minor public roads and rural lanes. The townland covers 93 statute acres.

== History ==
In earlier times, the townland was probably uninhabited as it consists mainly of peat bogs and poor clay soils. It was not seized by the English during the Plantation of Ulster in 1610 nor in the Cromwellian Settlement of the 1660s. This prompted a few dispossessed Irish families to move to the area and begin clearing and farming the land.

Maps of the townland drawn from 1813-1814 are in the National Archives of Ireland, Beresford Estate Maps, which depicts the townland as Tullinamortlough.

The Tithe Applotment Books for 1827 list six tithepayers in the townland.

The Ordnance Survey Name Books for 1836 give the following description of the townland-The soil is light...There is a trigonometrical station near the centre of the townland, 514 feet above the level of the sea.

In 1841 the population of the townland was 43, being 22 males and 21 females. There were six houses in the townland, all were inhabited.

In 1851 the population of the townland was 43, being 24 males and 19 females. There were six houses in the townland, all inhabited.

Griffith's Valuation of 1857 lists three landholders in the townland.

In 1861 the population of the townland was 35, being 19 males and 16 females. There were seven houses in the townland and all were inhabited.

In 1871 the population of the townland was 33, being 20 males and 13 females. There were seven houses in the townland and all were inhabited.(page 296 of census)

In 1881 the population of the townland was 43, being 17 males and 26 females. There were eight houses in the townland, all were inhabited.

In 1891 the population of the townland was 38, being 16 males and 22 females. There were seven houses in the townland, all were inhabited.

In the 1901 census of Ireland, there are ten families listed in the townland.

In the 1911 census of Ireland, there are ten families listed in the townland.

== Antiquities ==
1. Pedar a Voher's Crossroads which is immortalised in the song by Percy French as Eileen Oge, The Pride of Petravore. Pedar a Voher is a corruption of the Irish 'Peadar an bhóthair' for ‘Peter of the Road’, a Peter McGovern who kept a public house at the crossroads in the 18th century.
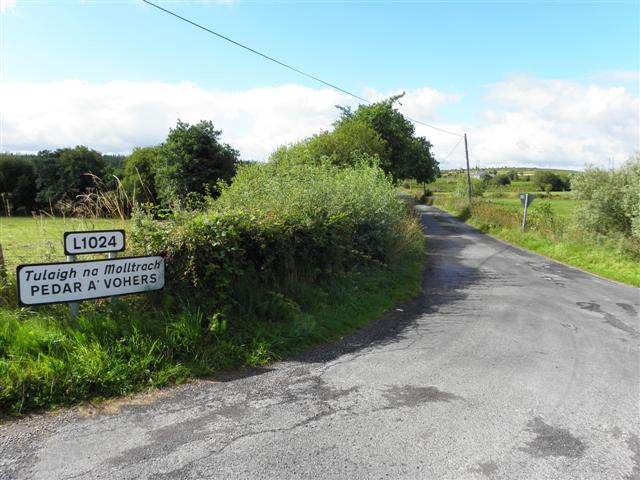
  L1024, Pedar A' Vohers Heading SSW from the R200
