= Knockmore, County Cavan =

Townland in Ireland

Coordinates: 54°07′25″N 7°45′19″W

Knockmore (from Irish Cnoc Mór, meaning 'The Big Hill') is a townland in the civil parish of Templeport, County Cavan, Ireland. It lies in the Roman Catholic parish of Corlough and barony of Tullyhaw.

== Geography ==
Knockmore is bounded on the west by Cornacleigh, Corlough townland, Tullytrasna and Corracholia More townlands, on the north by Clarbally townland, on the south by Corratillan townland and on the east by Muineal and Tonlegee townlands. Its chief geographical features are the River Blackwater, County Cavan, forestry plantations, gravel pits, dug wells and spring wells. Knockmore is traversed by minor public roads and rural lanes. The townland covers 275 statute acres. The sub-divisions of the townland are called- Mollybwee (Mullach Buidhe = The Yellow Hill-Face); Garry-Aymundhiv (Garraidhe Eamain Duibh = Black Edmund's Garden); Pullyarran (Poll a Ghearain = The Horse-Pool in the River).

== History ==
In the Plantation of Ulster by grant dated 24 February 1614, King James VI and I granted, inter alia, one pole of Knockmore to Tirlagh McHugh McBryan Bane O’Reylie. Tirlagh O’Reilly was the great-great-great-grandson of the chief of the O'Reilly clan, Seoan mac Pilib O’Reilly, who ruled East Breifne from 1392 to 1400. His genealogy is Toirdhealbhach Óg son of Aodh son of Brian Bán son of Conchobhar Óg of Bealach an Fheada son of Conchobhar Mór son of Seaán son of Phillip son of Giolla Íosa Ruadh son of Domhnall son of Cathal na Beithighe. Tirlagh O’Reilly's sons were Aodh, Brian and Seaán. The O’Reilly lands in Knockmore were confiscated in the Cromwellian Act for the Settlement of Ireland 1652 and were distributed as follows-

The 1652 Commonwealth Survey spells the townland as Knock and lists the proprietor as Captain Payne and the tenant as Daniell McConell.

A deed by Thomas Enery dated 29 Jan 1735 includes the lands of Knockmore.

A deed by John Enery dated 13 December 1774 includes the lands of Knockmore.

The 1790 Cavan Carvaghs list spells the name as Knockmore.

A lease dated 17 September 1816 John Enery of Bawnboy includes Knockmore.

The Tithe Applotment Books for 1827 list twenty-four tithepayers in the townland.

The 1836 Ordnance Survey Namebooks state- The townland is bounded on the west and south sides by a large stream.

The Knockmore Valuation Office Field books are available for 1839–1840.

In 1841 the population of the townland was 110, being 54 males and 56 females. There were seventeen houses in the townland, of which one was uninhabited.

In 1851 the population of the townland was 75, being 40 males and 35 females, the reduction being due to the Great Famine (Ireland). There were sixteen houses in the townland, of which two were uninhabited.

Griffith's Valuation of 1857 lists twenty-two landholders in the townland.

In 1861 the population of the townland was 83, being 48 males and 35 females. There were sixteen houses in the townland, of which two were uninhabited.

In 1871 the population of the townland was 85, being 46 males and 39 females. There were twelve houses in the townland and all were inhabited. (page 296 of census)

In 1881 the population of the townland was 76, being 41 males and 35 females. There were fourteen houses in the townland, all were inhabited.

In 1891 the population of the townland was 72, being 38 males and 34 females. There were fourteen houses in the townland, all were inhabited.

In the 1901 census of Ireland, there are seventeen families listed in the townland, and in the 1911 census of Ireland, there are eighteen families listed in the townland.

Folk tales relating to Knockmore can be found in the 1938 Dúchas folklore collection.

== Antiquities ==
1. Stone bridge built c.1770.CORLOUGH, CAVAN
2. The site of Knockmore hedge-school. The Second Report from the Commissioners of Irish Education Inquiry, 1826 lists the headmaster of Knockmore school as Thomas Slevin, a Roman Catholic. There were 47 Roman Catholic pupils of which 32 were boys and 15 girls. The schoolhouse was described as ‘temporary accommodation’. Bawnboy and Templeport History Heritage and Folklore - Past and Present
3. Stepping Stones across the river
4. Corlough Post Office
