= Derrymony =

Townland in County Cavan, Ireland

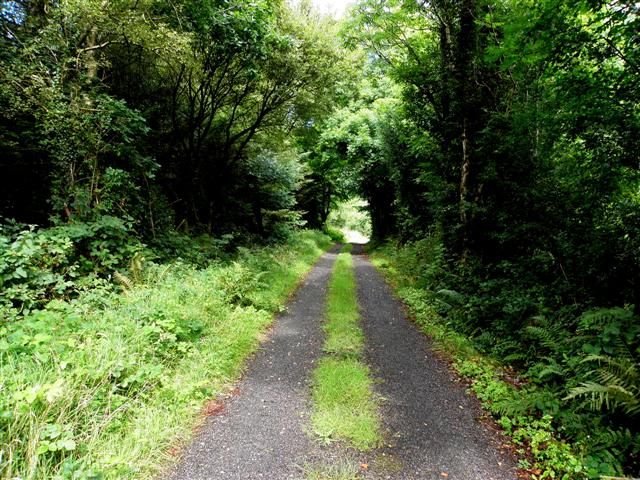
Road at Derrymony townland, Templeport, County Cavan, Ireland, heading north-northwest towards Brackley Lough

Derrymony (from Irish Doire Móna meaning ‘The Oakwood of the Bog’) is a townland in the civil parish of Templeport, County Cavan, Ireland. It lies in the Roman Catholic parish of Templeport and the barony of Tullyhaw.

== Geography ==
Derrymony is bounded on the north by Prospect, Corlough townland, on the west by Tirnawannagh townland in Corlough parish, on the south by Erraran townland and on the east by Killyneary and Brackley, Templeport townlands. Its chief geographical features are Brackley Lough, streams, forestry plantations and dug wells. Derrymony is traversed by minor public roads and rural lanes. The townland covers 254 statute acres.

== History ==
In medieval times the McGovern barony of Tullyhaw was divided into economic taxation areas called ballibetoes, from the Irish Baile Biataigh (Anglicized as 'Ballybetagh'), meaning 'A Provisioner's Town or Settlement'. The original purpose was to enable the farmer, who controlled the baile, to provide hospitality for those who needed it, such as poor people and travellers. The ballybetagh was further divided into townlands farmed by individual families who paid a tribute or tax to the head of the ballybetagh, who in turn paid a similar tribute to the clan chief. The steward of the ballybetagh would have been the secular equivalent of the erenagh in charge of church lands. There were seven ballibetoes in the parish of Templeport. Derrymony was located in the ballybetagh of "Bally Cloinelogh" (alias 'Bally Cloynelough'). The original Irish is Baile Cluain Loch, meaning 'The Town of the Lake Meadow')

The 1609 Baronial Map depicts the townland as part of Gortatawill. (Irish name, either Gort an Tuathail meaning 'The field facing away from the Sun' or Gort an Eochaille meaning "The Field of the Yew Wood".)

The 1652 Commonwealth Survey spells the name as Diremony.

The 1665 Down Survey map depicts it as Derrymony.

William Petty's 1685 map depicts it as Deremony.

In the Plantation of Ulster by grant dated 29 April 1611, King James VI and I granted the town and lands of Gortatowill containing 6 polls, comprising a total of 300 acres at an annual rent of £3-4s., to Mulmore McHugh McFarrall O'Rely, gent. Mulmore O'Reilly was the grandson of the chief of the O'Reilly clan, Fearghal macSeaán, who ruled East Breifne from 1526 to 1534. His genealogy is Maol Mórdha son of Aodh son of Fearghal son of Seaán son of Cathal son of Eóghan na Fésóige. Mulmore O'Reilly had four sons by his wife Honora- Émonn, Hugh O'Reilly (Archbishop of Armagh) (b. 1580, d. 1653), Fearghal and Domhnall. He also had an illegitimate son, Cathaoir. Mulmore died sometime between 1611 and 1637. He left his lands to his son Émonn (Edmund) O'Reilly. Émonn had three sons, Aodh (Hugh), Cathal and Brian. An Inquisition held in Cavan Town on 12 September 1638 found that the said Edm’ Relly recently of Gortetowell in Co. Cavan, in his life, was seised of a poll of land called Tawnagh, and of a poll called Carrick in said county. The said Edmund died on 29 September 1637. Hugh O’Reyly, his son and heir has reached his maturity and now holds the land from the king in free and common socage. Catherine Newgent, alias Reily, was the wife of the said Edmund and the aforesaid Catherine is dower of the premises. At the outbreak of the Irish Rebellion of 1641 Hugh O'Reilly still held the townland according to the Books of Survey and Distribution. Hugh O'Reilly had two sons, Émonn and Phillip. Hugh's son Émonn had one son Sémus.

The O’Reilly lands in Derrymony were confiscated in the Cromwellian Act for the Settlement of Ireland 1652. In 1657 A list of the Papist Proprietors names in the County of Cavan, as they are returned in the Civill Surveys of the said County gave the names of 20 landowners whose property was confiscated in the barony of Tullyhaw. These included Hugh O'Rely whose lands were distributed as follows-

The 1652 Commonwealth Survey lists the proprietor as Lieutenant Arthur Newborogh and the tenant as John Trench, both of whom appear in other Templeport townlands in the same survey.

In the Hearth Money Rolls compiled on 29 September 1663 there were seven taxpayers in Gartetoill- Thomas Magawran of Gartetoill, John Graham of the same, Tirlagh McKelagher of the same, Hugh McBrien of the same, Owen McKelacher of the same, Edmond O Helicke of the same and Hugh McGawran of the same.

The 1690 list of outlawed Irish Jacobites in County Cavan includes John Graham and Thomas Graham of Gortatole, gents. John Graham was probably the man named in the Hearth Money Rolls above or his son.

A deed by Thomas Enery dated 29 Jan 1735 includes the lands of Derrimoney.

A deed by John Enery dated 13 December 1774 includes the lands of Derrymoney.

The Tithe Applotment Books for 1827 list ten tithepayers in the townland.

The Derrymony Valuation Office Field books are available for October 1839.

Griffith's Valuation of 1857 lists seventeen landholders in the townland.

== Census ==
| Year | Population | Males | Females | Total Houses | Uninhabited |
|---|---|---|---|---|---|
| 1841 | 89 | 40 | 49 | 16 | 0 |
| 1851 | 71 | 36 | 35 | 10 | 2 |
| 1861 | 55 | 31 | 24 | 10 | 0 |
| 1871 | 35 | 15 | 21 | 6 | 0 |
| 1881 | 36 | 17 | 19 | 7 | 0 |
| 1891 | 27 | 17 | 10 | 6 | 0 |

In the 1901 census of Ireland, there are seven families listed in the townland.

In the 1911 census of Ireland, there are only five families listed in the townland.

== Antiquities ==
There do not seem to be any structures of historical interest in the townland.
