= Garvary (Corlough) =

Townland in the civil parish of Templeport, County Cavan, Ireland

Garvary (from Irish Garbhaire, meaning 'The Rough Land') is a townland in the civil parish of Templeport, County Cavan, Ireland. It lies in the Roman Catholic parish of Corlough and barony of Tullyhaw.

== Geography ==
Garvary is bounded on the north by Curraghabweehan townland, on the west by Corraclassy and Corranierna townlands, on the south by Derry Beg townland and on the east by Derryvahan and Scrabby, Corlough townlands. Its chief geographical features are the Owensallagh river (a source of the River Blackwater, County Cavan), forestry plantations, mountain streams and dug wells. Garvary is traversed by the R202 road (Ireland) and rural lanes. The townland covers 108 statute acres.

== History ==
In earlier times the townland was probably uninhabited as it consists mainly of bog and poor clay soils. It was not seized by the English during the Plantation of Ulster in 1610 or in the Cromwellian Settlement of the 1660s so some dispossessed Irish families moved there and began to clear and farm the land.

A deed dated 13 Nov 1738 includes: Garrohullaugh.

A deed dated 30 April 1740 by Thomas Enery includes: Garvallah.

The 1790 Cavan Carvaghs list spells the name as Lorga.

A map of the townland drawn in 1813 is in the National Archives of Ireland, Beresford Estate Maps. It depicts the townland as Garworragh, Gorworragh and Lurgy.

The Tithe Applotment Books for 1826 list four tithepayers in the townland.

The Garvary Valuation Office Field books are available for September 1839.

In 1841 the population of the townland was 56, of which 31 were males and 25 females. There were ten houses in the townland, all of which were inhabited.

In 1851 the population of the townland was 49, including 21 males and 28 females, the reduction being due to the Great Famine (Ireland). There were seven houses in the townland and all were inhabited.

Griffith's Valuation of 1857 lists ten landholders in the townland.

In 1861 the population of the townland was 38, including 19 males and 19 females. There were six houses in the townland and all were inhabited.

Six families were listed in the townland, according to the 1901 census of Ireland, and again at the time of the 1911 census of Ireland.

== Antiquities ==
1. The 19th century New Bridge
