= Corracholia Beg =

Townland in County Cavan, Ireland

Coordinates: 54.1378°N 7.7525°W

Corracholia Beg (from Irish Corr an Chuaille Beag meaning 'The Little Hill of the Pole (or tall branchless tree)) is a townland in the civil parish of Templeport, County Cavan, Ireland. It lies in the Roman Catholic parish of Corlough and barony of Tullyhaw. Local pronunciation is Corachuaille.

== Geography ==
Corracholia Beg is bounded on the north by Tullandreen townland, on the west by Corracholia More townland, on the south by Clarbally townland and on the east by Derryvella (Corlough) and Gubnagree townlands. Its chief geographical features are forestry plantations, small streams, and dug wells. Corracholia Beg is traversed by minor roads and rural lanes. The townland covers 85 statute acres.

== History ==
In earlier times the townland was probably uninhabited as it consists mainly of bog and poor clay soils. It was not seized by the English during the Plantation of Ulster in 1610 or in the Cromwellian Settlement of the 1660s so some dispossessed Irish families moved there and began to clear and farm the land.

A lease dated 17 September 1816 John Enery of Bawnboy includes Corrhollys otherwise Corrihollys otherwise Corraholies otherwise the Correholies.

The Tithe Applotment Books for 1827 list three tithepayers in the townland.

The Corracholia Beg Valuation Office Field books are available for September 1839.

In 1841 the population of the townland was 35, being 17 males and 18 females. There were six houses in the townland, all of which were inhabited.

In 1851 the population of the townland was 25, being 12 males and 13 females, the reduction being due to the Great Famine (Ireland). There were four houses in the townland, all inhabited.

Griffith's Valuation of 1857 lists four landholders in the townland.

In 1861 the population of the townland was 27, being 16 males and 11 females. There were four houses in the townland and all were inhabited.

In the 1901 census of Ireland, there are four families listed in the townland, and in the 1911 census of Ireland, there are four families listed in the townland.

== Antiquities ==
The chief structures of historical interest in the townland are

1. A Foot Stick across the stream
