= Carrick East =

Townland in County Cavan, Ireland

Coordinates: 54.07514°N 7.810271°W

Carrick East (from Irish Carraig meaning 'A Rock’) is a townland in the civil parish of Templeport, County Cavan, Ireland. It lies in the Roman Catholic parish of Templeport and barony of Tullyhaw. It is named Carrick East or Carrick Fisher to distinguish it from Carrick West or Carrick Hassard townland which is in Glangevlin parish.

== Geography ==
Carrick East is bounded on the north by Brackley, Templeport townland, on the west by Killyneary townland, on the south by Bawnboy townland and on the east by Gortnavreeghan townland. Its chief geographical features are Slieve Rushen mountain on whose western slope it lies, mountain streams and forestry plantations. Carrick East is traversed by minor roads and rural lanes. The townland covers 127 statute acres.

== History ==
In medieval times, the McGovern barony of Tullyhaw was divided into economic taxation areas called ballibetoes, from the Irish Baile Biataigh (Anglicized as 'Ballybetagh'), meaning 'A Provisioner's Town or Settlement'. There were seven ballibetoes in the parish of Templeport. Carrick East was located in the ballybetagh of "Balleagheboynagh" (alias 'Ballyoghnemoynagh'). The original Irish is Baile Na Muighe Eanach, meaning 'The Town of the Marshy Plain'). The ballybetagh was also called "Aghawenagh", the original Irish is Achadh an Bhuí Eanaigh, meaning 'The Field of the Yellow Bog').

Up until the 19th century, Carrick East was composed of two separate townlands, Carrick and Tonnyneask, which were then merged into a new townland of Carrick East.

=== Carrick (pre-1800) ===
The 1609 Baronial Map depicts the townland as Carricar.

The 1652 Commonwealth Survey lists it as Carricke.

The 1665 Down Survey map depicts the townland as Carrick.

William Petty's 1685 map depicts it as Carik. It is unclear whether Carrick was granted to anyone in the Plantation of Ulster. The first mention is in an Inquisition of 1638. In the Plantation of Ulster by grant dated 29 April 1611, King James VI and I granted the town and lands of Gortatowill containing 6 polls, comprising a total of 300 acres at an annual rent of £3-4s., to Mulmore McHugh McFarrall O'Rely, gent. Mulmore O'Reilly had been dispossessed of his lands in the townland of Aghaweely Lower in the parish of Ballintemple. He was the grandson of the chief of the O'Reilly clan, Fearghal macSeaán, who ruled East Breifne from 1526 to 1534. His genealogy is Maol Mórdha son of Aodh son of Fearghal son of Seaán son of Cathal son of Eóghan na Fésóige. Mulmore O'Reilly had four sons by his wife Honora- Émonn [Anglicised as Edmund], Hugh O'Reilly (Archbishop of Armagh) (b. 1580, d. 1653), Fearghal and Domhnall. He also had an illegitimate son, Cathaoir. Mulmore died sometime between 1611 and 1637. Émonn had three sons, Aodh (Hugh), Cathal and Brian. Whether Carrick originally formed part of the 1611 grant to Mulmore O'Reilly is unclear. The O'Reillys may have purchased it later, as Edmund was the owner in 1637. It then seems to have been sold to the Graham family of Bawnboy.

A grant dated 3 November 1666 was made by King Charles II of England to Sir Tristram Beresford, 1st Baronet, which included, inter alia, the lands of Carrick. By grant dated 11 September 1670 from King Charles II of England to said Sir Tristram Beresford, the said lands of Carrick were included in the creation of a new Manor of Beresford.

A lease dated 23 January 1717 from Morley Saunders to John Enery of Bawnboy includes one pole of land in Carrick.

A deed dated 30 April 1740 by Thomas Enery includes: Carrick.

A lease dated 10 December 1774 from William Crookshank to John Enery of Bawnboy includes the lands of Carrick. A further deed by John Enery dated 13 December 1774 includes the lands of Carrick.

=== Tonnyneask (pre-1800) ===
The 1609 Ulster Plantation Baronial Map depicts the townland as Tawnyyeske (Irish- Tamnach Eisc meaning 'The Green Field of the River Channels').

The 1652 Commonwealth Survey lists it as Tawnyneaghke and Tawnyneshke.

The 1665 Down Survey map depicts the townland as Tehenesk.

William Petty's 1685 map depicts it as Tonesk.

On 12 November 1590, Queen Elizabeth I of England granted pardons (No. 5489) to Cahill O'Doylane of Tonyaneske, Labourer and Philip Roe O'Doylane of same, horsekeeper for fighting against the Queen's forces.

On 25 January 1627, a grant was made of- a fourth of a pole of Tannyieske to Thomas Groves, the Rector or Vicar of the parish of Templepurt to hold as glebe land of Templeport Church. The said Thomas Groves was the Anglican rector of Templeport parish from 1626 to 1632.

In the Plantation of Ulster by grant dated 26 June 1615, King James VI and I granted, inter alia,- 3/4 of a poll in Tawny-yeske to Sir George Graeme and Sir Richard Graeme to form part of the Manor of Greame. An Inquisition held at Cavan on 31 October 1627 found that- George Greames was seised as of fee, of 20 polls of land in Co. Cavan, including one poll in Tawnyreske and he died 9 October 1624. William Greames, his son and heir, was then 30 years old (born 1594) and unmarried.

William Graham took part in the Irish Rebellion of 1641

A history of Richard and George Graham is viewable online at-

After the Cromwellian Act for the Settlement of Ireland 1652 the Graham lands in Tonnyeask were distributed as follows-

The 1652 Commonwealth Survey lists the proprietor of Tawnyneaghke as being Lieutenant John Blackforde and the tenant being William Lawther, both of whom appear as proprietor and tenant for several other Templeport townlands in the same survey.

Tonnyeask does not appear in the Hearth Money Rolls compiled on 29 September 1663

A lease dated 23 January 1717 from Morley Saunders to John Enery of Bawnboy includes one pole in Tawnenesk.

A lease dated 10 December 1774 from William Crookshank to John Enery of Bawnboy includes the lands of Taynynesh. A further deed by John Enery dated 13 December 1774 includes the lands of Tawneynesk otherwise Taynenesk.

The 1790 Cavan Carvaghs list spells the name as Tonnyneask

=== Post 1800 ===
A lease dated 17 September 1816 John Enery of Bawnboy includes part of the lands of Carrick called the Upper Deer Park otherwise called the Deer Park.

The Tithe Applotment Books for 1827 list three tithepayers in the townland.

The Carrick East Valuation Office Field books are available for November 1839.

Griffith's Valuation of 1857 lists five landholders in the townland.

== Census ==
Year	Population	Males	Females	Total Houses	Uninhabited
1841	47	22	25	6	0
1851	48	22	26	7	0
1861	19	9	10	5	0
1871	11	7	4	3	0
1881	17	8	9	5	0
1891	8	4	4	5	1

In the 1901 census of Ireland, there are three families listed in the townland, and in the 1911 census of Ireland, there is only one family listed in the townland.

== Antiquities ==
There do not seem to be any structures of historical interest in the townland.
