= Derrynaslieve =

Townland in County Cavan, Ireland

Coordinates: 54.1374°N 7.7384°W

Derrynaslieve (Irish: Doire na Sliabh lit. 'The Oakwood of the Mountain') is a townland in the civil parish of Templeport, County Cavan, Ireland. It lies in the Roman Catholic parish of Corlough and barony of Tullyhaw.

== Geography ==
Derrynaslieve is bounded on the north by Corranierna (Corlough) and Gubnagree townlands, on the south by Tonlegee townland, on the west by Derryvella (Corlough) townland and on the east by Derry Beg, Derry More and Derryconnessy townlands. Its chief geographical features are a stream and dug wells. Derrynaslieve is traversed by the R202 road (Ireland) and rural lanes. The townland covers 94 statute acres.

== History ==
In earlier times the townland was probably uninhabited as it consists mainly of bog and poor clay soils. It was not seized by the English during the Plantation of Ulster in 1610 or in the Cromwellian Settlement of the 1660s so some dispossessed Irish families moved there and began to clear and farm the land.

A map of the townland drawn in 1813 is in the National Archives of Ireland, Beresford Estate Maps, depicts the townland as Derrynasleave.

The Tithe Applotment Books for 1827 list four tithepayers in the townland.

The Derrynaslieve Valuation Office Field books are available for September 1839.

In 1841 the population of the townland was 41, being 22 males and 19 females. There were eight houses in the townland, all of which were inhabited.

In 1851 the population of the townland was 23, being 10 males and 13 females, the reduction being due to the Great Famine (Ireland). There were six houses in the townland, all were inhabited.

Griffith's Valuation of 1857 lists four landholders in the townland.

In 1861 the population of the townland was 27, being 12 males and 15 females. There were five houses in the townland and all were inhabited.

In the 1901 census of Ireland, there are two families listed in the townland and in the 1911 census of Ireland, there is one family listed in the townland.

== Antiquities ==
There are no known antiquities in the townland.
