= Derryvella (Corlough) =

Townland in the civil parish of Templeport, County Cavan, Ireland

Coordinates: 54.07514°N 7.810271°W

Derryvella (from Irish Doire an Bhile meaning – The Oakwood of the Ancient Tree) is a townland in the civil parish of Templeport, County Cavan, Ireland. It lies in the Roman Catholic parish of Corlough and barony of Tullyhaw.

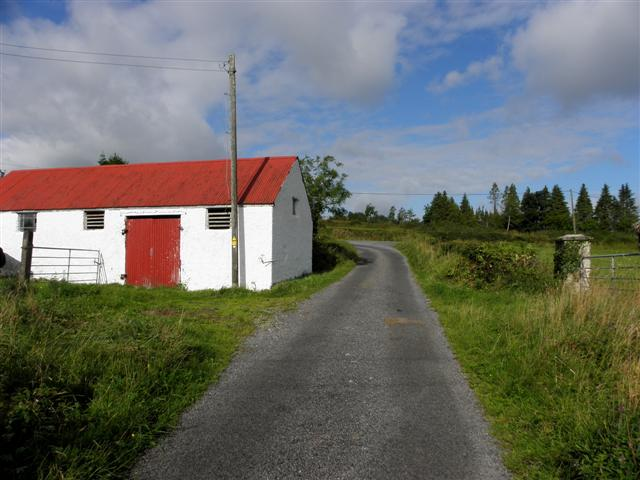
Derryvella townland, Corlough parish, County Cavan, Ireland. Heading WNW

== Geography ==
Derryvella is bounded on the north by Gubnagree townland, on the west by Corracholia Beg and Clarbally townlands and on the east by Derrynaslieve and Tonlegee townlands. Its chief geographical features are a stream, a spring well and dug wells. Derryvella is traversed by minor public roads and rural lanes. The townland covers 113 statute acres.

== History ==
In 1641 the owner of Derryvella was Gillernew (otherwise Gilderneve) McGovern (Gaelic- Giolla na Naomh Mág Samhradháin). He joined the Irish Rebellion of 1641 against British rule. The surviving British settlers later made depositions about the rebels activities, several of which mentioned Gillernew and the other McGoverns.

=== County Cavan depositions ===
William Reynolds of Lisnaore made a deposition about the rebellion in Lissanover as follows:

folio 260r William Reinoldes of Lisnaore in the parrish of Templeport in the County of Cavan gent sworne & examined deposeth and sajth That about the beginning of the presente Rebellion this deponent was deprived robbed or otherwise dispoiled & Lost by the Rebells: his meanes goodes & chattells concisting of horses mares beasts Cattle Corne hay howsholdstuff implements of husbandry apparell bookes provition silver spoones swyne & the benefite of his howse and six Poles of Land: due debts & other thinges of the value of three hundredth Sixtie fowre Powndes nine shillings sterling. And further sajth That the Rebells that soe robbed & dispojled him of his personall estate are theis that follow vizt Gillernew Mc Gawren & Hugh mc Manus oge mc Gawren both of the Parrish and County of Cavan aforesaid Turlaghe o Rely Brian Groome mc Gowren Daniell mc Gawren & Charles mc Gawren all of the place aforesaid gent: with divers other Rebells whose names he cannott expresse to the number of 30 or thereabouts And further sajth that theis 4 parties next after named (being duly indebted to this deponent) are or lately were in actuall Rebellion & carry armes with for & amongst the Rebells against his Maiesty and his loyall Subjects vizt ffarrell mc Gawren of the parish of Killiney & County aforesaid gent Cornelius ô Sheriden of in the County of ffermanagh gent, William Greames & Phelim mc Gowren both of Templeporte aforesaid gentlemen: And alsoe saith that the parties hereafter mencioned are or lately were alsoe actors in the same present Rebellion & carried armes & did take parts & assist the Rebells vizt ffarrell Broome mc Kallaghan of the Parrish of Templeport Wanderer: whoe as this deponent hath beene credibly tould murthered this deponents owne mother) Phillipp mc Hugh mc Shane o Rely of Ballinecargie in the County of Cavan Esquire now a Colonell of Rebells Capt Myles o Rely his brother Edmund Mc Mulmore o Rely of or nere Ballirely gent & Myles his sonn whoe when the Rebellion began was high sherriff of the said County of Cavan Phillip mc Mulmore o Rely of Ballytrusse Esquire John ô Rely his sonne & heire Sergeant Maio{r} Hugh Boy o Rely, Connor o Rely of Agheraskilly gent, Edmund mc Kernon of the Parrish of Kildallon gent & Edmund his sonn, & William another of his sons; William Greames of Templeport gentleman Owney Sheredin of the parrish of Kilmore gent, Andrew Mc Gowran of Templeport ffarrell mc Acorby of the same & James Brady of the same parrish gent; Cohonaghe Maguire of Aghloone gent Manus ô Mulmoghery of Aghloone aforesaid yeoman Turlogh mc Brian of Vrhoonoghe yeoman: Shane mc Brian of Killsallough, a popish Priest; ffarrell mc Adeggin of Aghavanny yeoman Owen Mc Adeggan of the same & Daniell mc Gowran of Gortneleck gent & Edmund his sonn: & divers others whose names & places of aboad he cannott Remember William Reynolds Jur 6o Apr 1643.

Thomas Crant in his deposition also mentioned the McGoverns among the rebels in Cavan:

Thomas Crant of the towne & Countye of Cavan gentleman, being duly sworne & examined deposeth & saith ….And The names of such Landed men as are in Rebellion of the Countye of Cavan are theis…The half Barronie of Tulleca County Cavan- Call mc Gawran, Gildernue mc Gawran, Turlough Oge mc Gawran, Donnell oge mc Gawran, Philomye mc Gawran, Richard Grahune.

Martin Kilhare of Drumlane made depositions about the rebellion in Munlough South and Drumlane:

Martine Killhare of Drumlane in the Countie of Cauan doe depose that my Brother Godferrye Killhare of Munlogh within the parish of Templeporte within the Baronie of Tullahae and Countie of Cauan, had in personale estate when this Rebellione first begane- Cowes ould and younge woorth £64; Horses woorth £20; Corne and haye worth £10; Houshould goods £10; In all £104. All these goods ware taken from him forceably aboute the 24th of October 1641 by the hands of Gillernew mc Gawran, and Manus mc Gawran, both of the parish of Templeport and Baronie of Tullaha and Countie of Cauan gent. Donnell Ogge mc Gawran of the same gent, Brian Ogge Mc Gawran of the same gent., Brian Ogge c Gawran of the same gent, and their followers. And further he cannot depose Signum [mark] predicti Martini 13 Jan: 1641 Jur coram nobis 30 Jan: 1641 Roger Puttocke Will: Hitchcock. Martine Killhare of the parish of Drumlane and Baronie of Loghte and Countie of Cauan, doth depose, that his mother Elizabeth Killhare and he had in personale estate when this Rebellione first begane Cowes ould and younge worth £122-10s-0d; horses and maires worth £45-10s-0d; sheepe worth £10; A Lease of 3 pooles of land within Sir Edward Bagshaws Proportione £80. Corne and haye £50. houshould goods £50. A bond of three pounds due at all Saints last. In all £331. <And that> All these goods ware taken from them forceibly aboute the 24th of October 1641 by the hands of Gillernew mc Gawran and Manus mc Gaweran of the parish of Temple porte, and Baronie of Tullahae and Countie of Cauan gent, Donell oge McGawran of the half Barrony of Tullehae gent Charles mc Goran of the same gentleman & about 200 more of their followers rebells, whoe quite robbed and dispoiled this deponents & mother and himself of the same goods.

Ambrose Bedell of Kilmore, County Cavan stated:

Ambrose Bedell gent sonn to the late reuerend father in God William Lord Bishop of Kimore in the County of Cavan (by the crueltie of the Rebells deceased) sworne and examined deposeth and sayth That….And further saith that theis persons hereafter named were & are notorious Rebells & actors in this presente Rebellion & doe partake Joine with carry armes with for and amongst the Rebells against the Kinges Maiestie & his loyall subjectes vizt … Charles mc Gowran of Castlegowran in the County of Lejtrun Esquire Gillernow ô Gowran of in the same County Esquire Turlogh oge mc Gowran of Bellaconen gentleman.

Arthur Culme of Cloughoughter Castle stated, inter alia:

Arthur Cul[me] of Cloughvter in the County of Cavan Esq[uire] duelie sworne And examyned deposeth.... And he sawe Charles mac Gawran beare Armes and hee was at the Castel severall times when I was with seveall Rebeles attending him; And I hee hath bine Crediblie informed that hee the said Charles mac Gawran [Do]nil mac Gawran, Phelim mac Gawran, Gilderan [mac] Gawran; And the most of that sept: are notor[ious rebeles] they live in the halfe Barrony of Tallahagh [and Countie] of Cavan I have bine likewise Credibelie [informed that] Mr James Talbot of BalleConnillin the [Countie of Ca]van is And {hath} bine A most notorious Cunning Rebel.

Thomas Jones and William Jones of Cornacrum stated:

A note of the names of them which we knowe of our owne knowledge to be pillagers of the brittish in the County of Cauan...Cahell mc Gawran de ballymcgawran; Gillernow mc Gawran of same; Donell mc Gawran of same; Phelyme mc Gawran of same.

James Gardiner of Aghabane stated:

James Gardiner late of Taghabane in the parrish of Kildallan in the County of Cavan gent sworne and examjned sayth That in the beginning of the present Rebellion Hee this deponent at Taghabane aforesaid and alsoe at Correnery in the Parrish of Killasandra & County of Cavan was deprived robbed or otherwise dispoyled of his goodes & chattells consisting of horses Mares a Coult beasts Cattle sheepe corne Malt howsholdgoods provition His stock in his tannhowse in Killisandra & of the possession Rents and proffitts of 2 farmes All of the value & to his present losse of ffive hundred & twenty powndes ster And this deponent is like to be deprived of, and loose the future proffits of his said farmes (worth £20 per annum) vntill a peace bee established: And further saith That the persons that soe deprived & dispojled him of his said goods were actors in the present Rebelljon and are named as followeth vizt Connor ô Rely of Aghroskilly in the same County gentleman John mcMulmore Rely of Killicrannah in the same County gent Gillernew McGaverran of Talloghagh gente and Charles Mc Gaverran of the same gent Keire ô Rourke of in the County of Leitrim gent Myles ô Rely then high sherriff of the said County of Cavan Ferrall mc Call ô Rely of Cashell in the same County of Cavan gent, & divers others whose names she hee knows not, being their souldjers Complicees and assistants.

=== County Leitrim depositions ===
Ralph Carr of Oughteragh parish stated:

Raph Carr of Clenlorgin in the County of Leitrim Glover sworne & examined deposeth and saith That since the beginning of the presente Rebellion and by meanes thereof James Carr late of the Parrish of Drumlane in the Countie of Cavan gent this deponents father. was depriued robbed or otherwise dispojled of his meanes goods and Chattells of the value following vizt, of Cattle worth £108; of Mares worth £10; Corne and hay worth £20; howshold goods and apparrell worth £30; Ready mony £4; th interest of a leas of Drumbarly worth £10; amounting in all to the summe of one hundreth fowrscore and twoe powndes ster by the Rebells Charles McGowran Phelim McGowran Gillernow McGowran & others their souldjers to the number of 2 or 300 at the be whose names he cannott expresse & saith that the Rebells aforesaid afterwards hanged this afterwards one Donnell o Rely of the same parish & his Confederates vnder the Comand of Phillip mcHughe ô Rely Colonell, hanged vp to death this deponents said father & one Timothy Dickinson And drowned this deponents mother & thirtie seven more men women and Children protestants in the River of Beturbett, throwing them over the bridg there. as this deponent hath beene credibly informed by William Blo cksom Blocksome, John Hickman, Nicholas Wilkinson Thomas Partridge & others of Belturbett that saw the wickednes done & this deponent verely beleeveth, & hath too much cawse to assure himself that their Report is true: But the deponent comeing away in the beginning of the Rebellion & before theis Murthers were Committed cannott speake to the same nor to any other cruelties traiterous words or other thinges Comitted [spoken] or done by the Rebells before since he came out of that Cuntrie of his owne Knowledg.

Thomas Lewis of Oughteragh parish stated:

Thomas Lewes of Kilanshele in the parish of Cotterah within the Baronie of Cargallan and Countie of Letrime being duly sworne doth depose that I had in personale estate, when That since this Rebellione first began he was deprived & robbed his goodes & Chattells following vizt- Leases woorth £80; Cowes and steeres and heffers and horses and mares worth £112; Corne and haye £36; In debts due to me £44-18s-0d; In houshold goods worth £50; In all amounting £322-18s-4d. Besids a bond of my Lord Parsons which was fiue hundred pounds left in my Costodie for moneys and security due to his Lordship. All which goods chattells & bond ware taken from me by Charles mcGawran, Gillernew mcGowran and Donile ogge mcGawran and Willyam Grimes and Bryane mcCornan O'Rurk's wiffe, all of the parish of Temple port and Baronie of Tullehane and Countie of Cauan and Brian o Rourk & his wiffe of the parrish of otraghie and County of Leitrim aboute the 25 of October 1641: which persons when thay pressed by violence into my howse, I demanded by what authoritie thay did soe they answared me that it was not a time for me to question authoritie nowe And aboute the 18 of 8ber 1641 one Turlah McPhelim McJeffry O Rourke of Liscollpheale of the parish of Outrah and County of Letrim said to this deponent, that the King had given vnto one O Rourk a prisoner beyond seas the whole County of Letrim, and if they could not gett the Barony County, they would try hard for the Barony. And farther deposeth that aboute the time that this deponent was robbed there were 296 persons more dwelling in the said parish and within a mile or therabouts therof that were robbed of all their goods likewise.

Elizabeth Kiddier of County Leitrim stated:

Elizabeth Kiddier the wife of Tho: Kiddier of Bowhighshell in the County of Leitrim yeoman sworne and examined deposeth and sayth That since the beginning of the present Rebellion vizt about the 25th of October 1641 Her said husband and shee, were deprived robbed or otherwise dispojled of their meanes goods & Chattells Consisting of Beasts Cattle horses Corne hay howsholdgoods & provision: Thinterest of their farme & other thinges of the value of threescore and fowrteene Powndes sterling And that shee and her 2 Children were stript of their clothes & turned out into the Cold aire: Soe that the Children & six more of the Children of others were starved & dyed both in one day & night. And further saith that the Rebells that soe robbed & deprived them of their goods, & that alsoe robbed others of their goods and meanes were theis that followe vizt- Charles McGowran, Gillernew mcGowran & Donell oge mc Gowran and William Grymes all of the Parrish of Templeport & Barrony of Tullehan in the County of Cavan, and Brian ô Rourke and his wiffe of the parrish of Owtraghie, and County of Leitrim ffarrell Mc Granell & Geoffrie McGranell of the Parrish of Drumreleigh & County of Leitrim aforesaid and a greate number of other wicked & Rebellious persons whose names shee knoweth not. And further sajth that the Rebells of the seuerall Counties of Leitrim and Cavan murthered and cruelly slew theis protestants following vizt Robert Hodges & his 2 sonns: Elizabeth Bispham Richard Dudd this deponents brother in lawe) Richard Carrington, William Suggett, & one R Mr Robert Crosse, & The wiffe of one Edward Bispham; And shee was hath credibly heard that the Rebells alsoe hanged a miller one Owen Powell a miller that was sent with a letter from Sir ffrancis Hamilton knighte.

Mary Carr of Oughteragh stated:

Mary Carr the wif Relict of John Carr Late of the Parrish of Owtragh in the County of Leitrim yeoman: (whoe was lately slaine by the Rebells betwixt Bellamont and Dublin) sworne & examined deposeth and saith That on or about the 24th day of October 1641 When the Rebellion was begun shee and her said husband (then alive) were In the parrish aforesaid deprived robbed, & dispoyled of their goods and Chattells Consisting of Cattle horses Corne hay howsholdgoods provition ready mony & other things all Amounting to twoe hundreth Powndes sterling By theis Rebells following vizt- Gillernaw McGowran of Tullahaghe five myles from Belturbett a Comander of Rebells, Charles McGowran of the same his nephew, another Comander of Rebells Brian mcShanaghan of the parrish of Drumreliegh in the County of Leitrim husbandman Donnell dove mcGrourke of the same parrish gent and divers other Rebellious persons whose names shee cannott expresse And they further saith That the Rebells would publiquely & ordinarily: bidd this deponent, her husband & the rest of the English protestants hast away into England. Els they should bee all slaine saying further that all the English must into England, the Scotts into Scotland: & the Irish must bee in Ireland: And that they (meaneing the Rebells) had the Kinges broade seale for what they did.

=== County Fermanagh depositions ===
Thomas Leysance of Mackan stated:

Thomas Leysance of Mackan in the Countye of fearmangh in the Barrony of Clowneully yeoman Aged twenty foure yeares or ther abouts being duely swearne and examined saith that on the daye and yeare afore saide he was robed and striped be one Redmond oge mc Keawely gentleman Morish Ballaghe mc Kassedy fflearotteragh mc Huigh gentleman and ffleartagh magweire gentleman ffellem maguire gentleman and diuers others of the parish of klineally in the County a ffore saide they being all followers and belonging to Captine Rory Magweire of all thise lands the goodes & Chattles al followeth & things following vizt of the possession & profits of Inprimis the Thirde parte of a greate tate of land Called macken in the Barrony of Clowenally which I he hade in leise fore one and twenty yeares worth to be soulde Tenn pounds ster, and Thirty pounds in redy mony fore Cowes and younge Chattles and fore horses and meres and Coults Corne and haye and howsehould goods and foore tobes of Boutter all which amounts unto towe eight score houndered and eight pounds ster and fouther hee sayeth that vppon the Tweiseday next after the day aboue written, Charles Leysance father to the foresaid Thomas and Mr ffrances shillyart and John Cravann and younge John Cravann his sonn whoe as they weare Comeing frome there one howses towards Doubleinge a little of on this side Clowne Ally Church were assaulted & sett vppon bee ...Dannell magaweran, Gellernowe magawran...all Rebells.

Because Gillernew took part in the Irish Rebellion of 1641 his lands were seized under the Act for the Settlement of Ireland 1652 and granted to Sir Tristram Beresford, 1st Baronet.

The 1652 Commonwealth Survey lists the townland as Dirrevily and the proprietor as Lieutenant-Colonel Tristram Beresford.

Deeds, tenant lists etc. relating to Derryvella from 1650 onwards are available at-

Beresford then leased the land to John Graham. On 13 March 1706 Marcus Beresford, 1st Earl of Tyrone leased the lands of Derivilly alias Derryvereally to Robert Saunders (Irish lawyer), one of the founders of the village of Swanlinbar, for a term of 99 years. In his will dated 8 March 1707, Saunders left the lands to his son Morley Saunders Morley Saunders later sold his interest in Deryvelly to Colonel John Enery of Bawnboy by deed dated 24 December 1720.

The 1790 Cavan Carvaghs list spells the name as Dirryvilla.

A map of the townland drawn in 1813 is in the National Archives of Ireland, Beresford Estate Maps, depicts the townland as Derryvullagh Bog.

A lease dated 17 September 1816 John Enery of Bawnboy includes Derryvallagh.

The Tithe Applotment Books for 1827 list twenty-five tithepayers in the townland.

The Derryvella Valuation Office Field books are available for September 1839.

In 1841 the population of the townland was 41, being 19 males and 22 females. There were six houses in the townland, all of which were inhabited.

In 1851 the population of the townland was 44, being 19 males and 25 females. There were six houses in the townland, all were inhabited.

Griffith's Valuation of 1857 lists six landholders in the townland.

In 1861 the population of the townland was 24, being 12 males and 12 females. There were four houses in the townland and all were inhabited.

In the 1901 census of Ireland, there are five families listed in the townland, and in the 1911 census of Ireland, there are four families listed in the townland.

A 1930s folklore store about the Banshee in Derryvella is available at-

== Antiquities ==
There are no known antiquities in the townland
