= Corraclassy =

Townland in County Cavan, Ireland

Corraclassy (from Irish Corr an Chlasaigh, meaning 'The Hill of the Trench or Furrow') is a townland in the civil parish of Templeport, County Cavan, Ireland. It lies in the Roman Catholic parish of Corlough and barony of Tullyhaw.

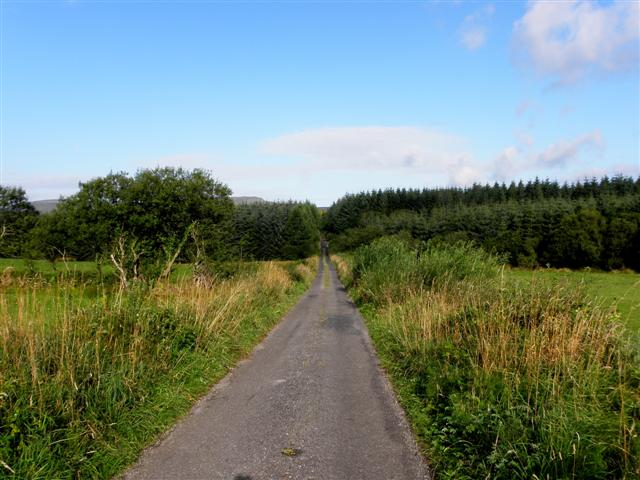
Road at Corraclassy townland, Corlough parish, County Cavan, Ireland. Heading WNW

== Geography ==
Corraclassy is bounded on the north by Drumbeagh townland, on the west by Tullandreen townland, on the south by Gubnagree and Corranierna (Corlough) townlands and on the east by Garvary (Corlough) and Curraghabweehan townlands. Its chief geographical features are the Owensallagh river (a source of the River Blackwater, County Cavan) and dug wells. Corraclassy is traversed by minor public roads and rural lanes. The townland covers 56 statute acres.

== History ==
In earlier times the townland was probably uninhabited as it consists mainly of bog and poor clay soils. It was not seized by the English during the Plantation of Ulster in 1610 or in the Cromwellian Settlement of the 1660s so some dispossessed Irish families moved there and began to clear and farm the land.

A map of the townland drawn in 1813 is in the National Archives of Ireland, Beresford Estate Maps, depicts the townland as Curraghclassy. In the 19th century the landlord was Lord John Beresford, the Protestant Archbishop of Armagh. The muddled land history of the area prior to this is described in the 1838 Exchequer case, "Attorney General of Ireland v The Lord Primate".

The Tithe Applotment Books for 1826 list one tithepayer in the townland.

The Ordnance Survey Name Books for 1836 give the following description of the townland- The soil is of a boggy light nature...a corn mill and kiln.

The Corraclassy Valuation Office Field books are available for September 1839.

In 1841 the population of the townland was 21, including 12 males and 9 females. There were three houses in the townland, all of which were inhabited.

In 1851 the population of the townland was 14, comprising 6 males and 8 females, the reduction being due to the Great Famine (Ireland). There were twelve houses in the townland, all inhabited.

Griffith's Valuation of 1857 lists two landholders in the townland.

In 1861 the population of the townland was 14, comprising 5 males and 9 females. There were two houses in the townland and all were inhabited.

Three families are listed in the townland at the time of the 1901 census of Ireland, while the number fell to two families at the 1911 census of Ireland.

== Antiquities ==
1. Site of a 19th-century Corn Mill and Mill Race
2. Site of a 19th-century Cattle Pound
3. Lime-kilns
4. A bridge
