= Corracholia More =

Townland in County Cavan, Ireland

Coordinates: 54.07514°N 7.810271°W

Corracholia More (from Irish Corr an Chuaille Mór meaning 'The Big Hill of the Pole (or tall branchless tree)) is a townland in the civil parish of Templeport, County Cavan, Ireland. It lies in the Roman Catholic parish of Corlough and barony of Tullyhaw.

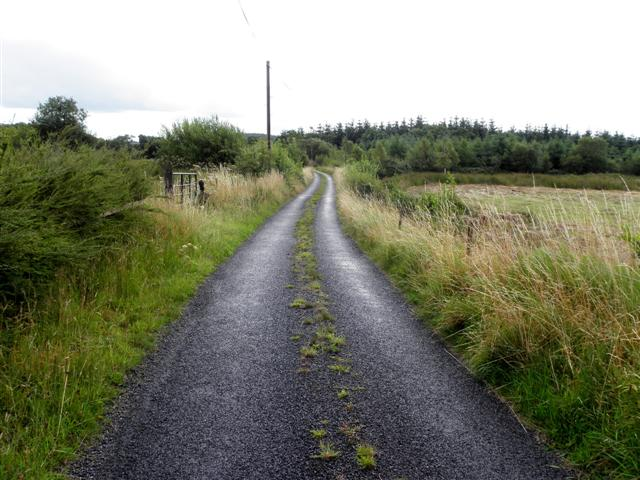
Road at Corracholia More townland, Corlough parish, County Cavan, Ireland. Heading SSE

== Geography ==
Corracholia More is bounded on the north by Eaglehill and Tullandreen townlands, on the west by Tullybrack townland, on the south by Clarbally, Knockmore, County Cavan and Tullytrasna townlands and on the east by Corracholia Beg townland. Its chief geographical features are forestry plantations, small streams, and dug wells. Corracholia More is traversed by minor roads and rural lanes. The townland covers 115 statute acres.

== History ==
In earlier times the townland was probably uninhabited as it consists mainly of bog and poor clay soils. It was not seized by the English during the Plantation of Ulster in 1610 or in the Cromwellian Settlement of the 1660s so some dispossessed Irish families moved there and began to clear and farm the land.

A lease dated 17 September 1816 John Enery of Bawnboy includes Corrhollys otherwise Corrihollys otherwise Corraholies otherwise the Correholies.

The Tithe Applotment Books for 1827 list three tithepayers in the townland.

The Corracholia More Valuation Office Field books are available for September 1839.

In 1841 the population of the townland was 28, being 18 males and 10 females. There were five houses in the townland, all of which were inhabited.

In 1851 the population of the townland was 15, being 10 males and 5 females, the reduction being due to the Great Famine (Ireland). There were three houses in the townland, all inhabited.

Griffith's Valuation of 1857 lists six landholders in the townland.

In 1861 the population of the townland was 30, being 15 males and 15 females. There were five houses in the townland and all were inhabited.

In the 1901 census of Ireland, there are eight families listed in the townland and in the 1911 census of Ireland, there are six families listed in the townland.

== Antiquities ==
There are no structures of historical interest in the townland.
