= Arderry =

Townland in the civil parish of Templeport, County Cavan, Ireland

Coordinates: 54.07514°N 7.810271°W

Arderry (from Irish Ard Doire, meaning 'the high Oakwood') is a townland in the civil parish of Templeport, County Cavan, Ireland. It lies in the Roman Catholic parish of Corlough and barony of Tullyhaw.

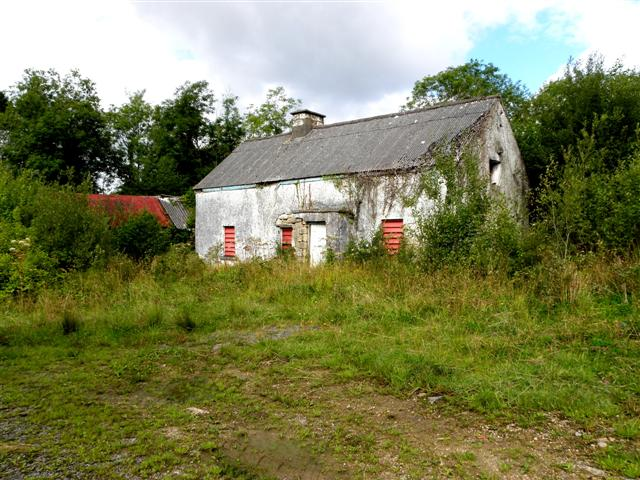
Ruined farmhouse in Arderry townland, parish of Corlough, County Cavan, Ireland. Looking north-east.

== Geography ==
Arderry is bounded on the north by Moneynure townland, on the west by Derryconnessy and Muineal townlands, on the south by Teeboy townland and on the east by Tirnawannagh townland. Its chief geographical features are Bunerky Lough (Irish = Loch Bun Adhairc = The Lake of the Butt of the Horn), small streams, dug wells and spring wells.

Arderry is traversed by minor roads and rural lanes.

The townland covers 209 statute acres.

== History ==
In medieval times the McGovern barony of Tullyhaw was divided into economic taxation areas called ballibetoes, from the Irish Baile Biataigh (Anglicized as 'Ballybetagh'), meaning 'A Provisioner's Town or Settlement'. The original purpose was to enable the farmer, who controlled the baile, to provide hospitality for those who needed it, such as poor people and travellers. The ballybetagh was further divided into townlands farmed by individual families who paid a tribute or tax to the head of the ballybetagh, who in turn paid a similar tribute to the clan chief. The steward of the ballybetagh would have been the secular equivalent of the erenagh in charge of church lands. There were seven ballibetoes in the parish of Templeport. Arderry was located in the ballybetagh of Ballymackgonghan (Irish = Baile Mac Eochagain, meaning 'McEoghan's Town').

The 1614 Ulster Plantation grants list the townland as Tardirry.

The 1652 Commonwealth Survey lists the name as Ardirry.

In the Plantation of Ulster by grant dated 24 February 1614, King James VI and I granted, inter alia, one pole of Tardirry to Phelim McHugh O'Reyly, Bryan McHugh O'Reyly and Cahir McHugh O'Reyly, the sons of Hugh Reyly, late of Ballaghaneo, County Cavan. Ballaghaneo is now the townland of Ballaghanea in Lurgan Parish, County Cavan, on the shores of Lough Ramor, so the O'Reillys were removed a long way from their home by the Plantation. Hugh Reyly was the great-grandnephew of the chief of the O'Reilly clan, Eoghan na Fésóige mac Seoain, who ruled from 1418–1449. The O’Reilly lands in Arderry were confiscated in the Cromwellian Act for the Settlement of Ireland 1652 and were distributed as follows-

The 1652 Commonwealth Survey lists the proprietor as Captain Payne and the tenant as Cormuck McBrian.

In the Hearth Money Rolls compiled on 29 September 1663, there were four people listed as paying the tax- Hugh Mageaghan of Arderry, Hugh McDermond of the same, Donell McConnell of the same and Tirlagh McBrien of the same.

A lease dated 31 January 1718 from Morley Saunders to John Enery of Bawnboy includes the lands of Arderry.

A deed by Thomas Enery dated 29 Jan 1735 includes the lands of Ardery.

A lease dated 10 December 1774 from William Crookshank to John Enery of Bawnboy includes the lands of Ardery. A further deed by John Enery dated 13 December 1774 includes the lands of Ardery otherwise Ardrey otherwise Arderry.

The 1790 list of Cavan Carvaghs spells it as Arderry.

A lease dated 17 September 1816 John Enery of Bawnboy includes Ardera otherwise Ardry otherwise the two Arderas.

The Tithe Applotment Books for 1827 list forty-four tithepayers in the townland.

The 1836 Ordnance Survey Namebooks describe the townland as- The soil is light intermixed with lime & sandstone ...There is a Roman Catholic chapel at the east side of the townland capable of holding 250 persons.

The Arderry Valuation Office Field books are available for 1839–1840.

In 1841 the population of the townland was 124, being 66 males and 58 females. There were nineteen houses in the townland, all of which were inhabited.

In 1851 the population of the townland was 100, being 45 males and 55 females, the reduction being due to the Great Famine (Ireland). There were eighteen houses in the townland and all were inhabited.

Griffith's Valuation of 1857 lists thirty landholders in the townland.

In 1861 the population of the townland was 86, being 39 males and 47 females. There were seventeen houses in the townland and all were inhabited.

In 1871 the population of the townland was 72, being 38 males and 34 females. There were fifteen houses in the townland, all were inhabited.

In 1881 the population of the townland was 74, being 38 males and 36 females. There were fifteen houses in the townland, one of which was uninhabited.

In 1891 the population of the townland was 61, being 29 males and 32 females. There were fifteen houses in the townland, one of which was uninhabited.

In the 1901 census of Ireland, there are fourteen families listed in the townland, and in the 1911 census of Ireland, there are twelve families listed in the townland.

Folk tales relating to Arderry can be found at

== Antiquities ==
The chief structures of historical interest in the townland are

1. An earthen ringfort. Marked 'Fort' on OS 1836 and 1876 eds. Situated in low-lying ground close to a stream.
2. A large earthen enclosure.
3. Foot bridges across the streams
4. The site of Arderry Roman Catholic church and school. The church was erected in the 18th century and remained in use until a few years after the erection of the new church in Corlough in 1857. It was made of wood with dimensions of 54 ft x 22 ft x 8.5 ft. Local tradition states that Father John Ward, the parish priest of Templeport from 1758–1795, rode his horse from Bawnboy to Arderry Church to celebrate Mass each Sunday and had breakfast with the local teacher John O'Hara whose school was also held at the church and who also held a Sunday School there. The 6 inch 1836 OS map depicts the church and school and the 1836 OS Namebooks state- There is a Roman Catholic chapel at the east side of the townland capable of holding 250 persons.
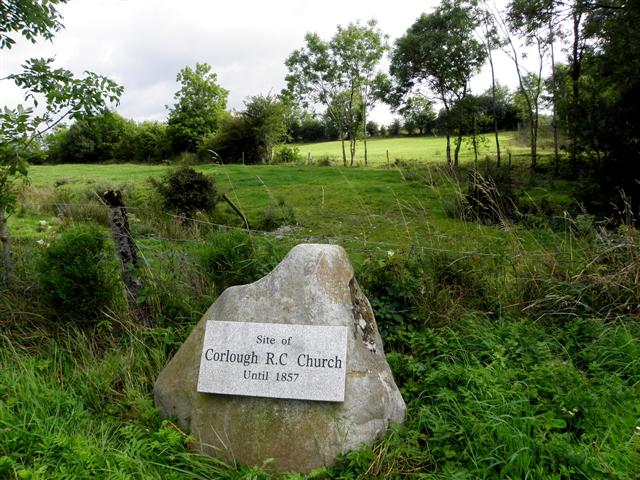
  Site of former Arderry Roman Catholic Church, Arderry townland, Corlough parish, County Cavan, Ireland
5. The site of Arderry National School, Roll No. 7219. This was erected when the church school closed. It is depicted on the 25 inch OS map on the road west of the old church. In 1862 James Smyth was the headmaster and Ellen McTeague was the workmistress, both Roman Catholics. There were 133 pupils, all Roman Catholic apart from 4 who were Church of Ireland. The Catechism was taught to the Catholic pupils on weekdays from 3pm to 3:30pm and on Saturdays they were taught it by Michael Byrne and Peter Byrne from 12 noon to 1:30pm. In 1874 the school had two teachers, both Roman Catholic, who received total annual salaries of £41. It had 149 pupils, 83 boys and 66 girls. In 1890 there were 96 pupils.
