= Tonlegee =

Townland in County Cavan, Ireland

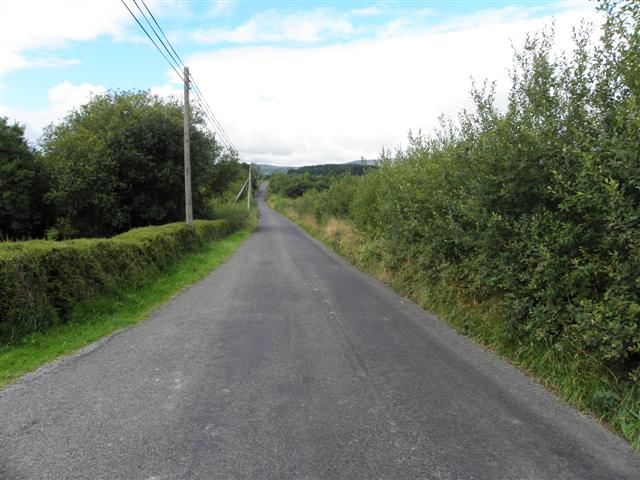
A road in Tonlagee townland; Facing west

Tonlegee (from Irish Tóin le Gaoith, meaning 'Bottom of the Hill facing the Wind') is a townland in the civil parish of Templeport, County Cavan, Ireland. It lies in the Roman Catholic parish of Corlough and barony of Tullyhaw. The townland was also called Clonmeoun, probably an Anglicisation of the Gaelic 'Cluain Mín' meaning The Smooth Meadow.

== Geography ==
Tonlegee is bounded on the north by Derrynaslieve and Derryvella (Corlough) townlands, on the south by Muineal townland, on the west by Clarbally and Knockmore, County Cavan townlands and on the east by Derryconnessy townland. Its chief geographical features are small streams and dug wells. Tonlegee is traversed by the R202 road (Ireland) and rural lanes. The townland covers 134 statute acres.

== History ==
In medieval times the McGovern barony of Tullyhaw was divided into economic taxation areas called ballibetoes, from the Irish Baile Biataigh (Anglicized as 'Ballybetagh'), meaning 'A Provisioner's Town or Settlement'. The original purpose was to enable the farmer, who controlled the baile, to provide hospitality for those who needed it, such as poor people and travellers. The ballybetagh was further divided into townlands farmed by individual families who paid a tribute or tax to the head of the ballybetagh, who in turn paid a similar tribute to the clan chief. The steward of the ballybetagh would have been the secular equivalent of the erenagh in charge of church lands. There were seven ballibetoes in the parish of Templeport. Tonlegee was located in the ballybetagh of Ballymackgonghan (from Irish Baile Mac Eochagain, meaning 'McEoghan's Town').

In the Plantation of Ulster by grant dated 24 February 1614, King James VI and I granted, inter alia, one pole of Clonmeoun to Phelim McHugh O'Reyly, Bryan McHugh O'Reyly and Cahir McHugh O'Reyly, the sons of Hugh Reyly, late of Ballaghaneo, County Cavan. Ballaghaneo is now the townland of Ballaghanea in Lurgan Parish, County Cavan, on the shores of Lough Ramor, so the O'Reillys were removed a long way from their home by the Plantation. Hugh Reyly was the great-grandnephew of the chief of the O'Reilly clan, Eoghan na Fésóige mac Seoain, who ruled East Breifne from 1418 to 1449. The O’Reilly lands in Tonlegee were confiscated in the Cromwellian Act for the Settlement of Ireland 1652 and were distributed as follows-

The 1652 Commonwealth Survey depicts the townland as Clanmoyn with the proprietor being Captain Payne.

In the Hearth Money Rolls compiled on 29 September 1663 there was one Hearth Tax payer in Tonage- Cahell McGawran.

A lease dated 31 January 1718 from Morley Saunders to John Enery of Bawnboy includes the lands of Tonlegee.

A lease dated 10 December 1774 from William Crookshank to John Enery of Bawnboy includes the lands of Tonlegee, as does a further deed by John Enery dated 13 December 1774.

The 1790 Cavan Carvaghs list spells the name as Tonlegee.

A map of the townland drawn in 1813 is in the National Archives of Ireland, Beresford Estate Maps, depicts the townland as Tonlagee and the proprietor as John Ennery.

A lease dated 17 September 1816 John Enery of Bawnboy includes Tonlegee.

The Tithe Applotment Books for 1827 list eight tithepayers in the townland.

The Tonlegee Valuation Office Field books are available for October 1839.

In 1841 the population of the townland was 55, being 25 males and 30 females. There were nine houses in the townland, of which one was uninhabited.

In 1851 the population of the townland was 58, being 32 males and 26 females. There were eight houses in the townland, all were inhabited.

Griffith's Valuation of 1857 lists seven landholders in the townland.

In 1861 the population of the townland was 55, being 31 males and 24 females. There were seven houses in the townland and all were inhabited.

In 1871 the population of the townland was 45, being 27 males and 18 females. There were seven houses in the townland and all were inhabited.(page 296 of census)

In 1881 the population of the townland was 48, being 29 males and 19 females. There were seven houses in the townland, all were inhabited.

In 1891 the population of the townland was 41, being 21 males and 20 females. There were seven houses in the townland, all were inhabited.

In the 1901 census of Ireland, there are eight families listed in the townland, and in the 1911 census of Ireland, there are nine families listed in the townland.

Folktales from Tonlagee are available at

== Antiquities ==
1. There are stones inscribed in Irish in the stream dividing the eastern part of Tonlagee from Derryconnessy townland. The 1930s Dúchas Folklore collection give the following accounts of a battle fought there- (1) A battle was fought in Crocán na gCamps, Derryconnessy; Corlough. Co. Cavan. It is supposed to have been fought between the Gael and Danes. When the cavalry were coming to Crocán na gCamps they had a row and fought a battle. The fought in Tullyvella and Conspud. It is not known which side won the battle, but they are still supposed to fight, at certain times of the year at night, and it is thought to be a bad sign of disturbance when dead people come back to fight. There are Ogham stones at Crocán na gCampa. (2) Long ago, when the early colonists came into this country, they had a big battle on the land now owned by Mr. Francis McGovern, Tonlagee, Corlough, Bawnboy, Co. Cavan. The field in which one army pitched their campaign is now called Cnocán na gCampa which means 'The little hill of the campus'. It is a pretty field with grass much greener than that in the neighbouring fields. Beside it, is the field where the battle was fought. It is a grey field covered with large stones which are said to be monuments to the men who fell in the battle and are buried under them. It is said that if the field was dug up, the bones of the dead would be found in it. A stream runs by the battle fields, and touches it on the two sides. The stream is almost choked up by big stones, and there are two stones among them, with old Irish writing on them. This is all the information that is available, about the battle in this district. It is not known exactly, what tribes had the battle, but it is known that it took place thousands of years ago. The fields are along the main road from Swanlinbar to Ballinamore.
