= Clarbally =

Townland in Templeport, County Cavan, Ireland

Clarbally (from Irish Clár Bhaile, meaning 'Level Townland' or more likely Clár Bealaigh meaning 'The Foot-Bridge Pathway'') is a townland in the civil parish of Templeport, County Cavan, Ireland. It lies in the Roman Catholic parish of Corlough and barony of Tullyhaw.

== Geography ==
Clarbally is bounded on the north by Corracholia More and Corracholia Beg townlands, on the southwest by Knockmore, County Cavan townland, on the south by Tonlegee townland and on the east by Derryvella (Corlough) townland. Its chief geographical features are a mountain stream, forestry plantations and a spring well. Clarbally is traversed by minor public roads and rural lanes. The townland covers 145 statute acres,. A sub-division is called The Pullinagh (Probably Gaelic- Poll na nEach meaning 'Hole or Pit of the Horses'. A field belonging to Mr Frank McGovern of Clarbally in 1938. Mass was said on a little bank in it during the Penal Days).

== History ==
In earlier times the townland was probably uninhabited as it consists mainly of bog and poor clay soils. It was not seized by the English during the Plantation of Ulster in 1610 or in the Cromwellian Settlement of the 1660s so some dispossessed Irish families moved there and began to clear and farm the land.

A map of the townland drawn in 1813 is in the National Archives of Ireland, Beresford Estate Maps, which show the townland as Clorbally belonging to the Protestant bishop of Armagh, Lord John Beresford and leased to John Enery esquire.Search Results - tullyhaw

A lease dated 17 September 1816 John Enery of Bawnboy includes Clarballagh.

The Tithe Applotment Books for 1826 list the following tithepayers in the townland- Donohoe, Kiernan, Magauran, McGoldrick.

The Ordnance Survey Name Books for 1836 give the following description of the townland- The soil is light and is intermixed with boulders of sandstone.

The Clarbally Valuation Office Field books are available for September 1839.

In 1841 the population of the townland was 67, being 34 males and 33 females. There were ten houses in the townland, all of which were inhabited.

In 1851 the population of the townland was 46, being 23 males and 23 females, the reduction being due to the Great Famine (Ireland). There were six houses in the townland, all inhabited.

Griffith's Valuation of 1857 lists ten landholders in the townland.

In 1861 the population of the townland was 47, being 23 males and 24 females. There were six houses in the townland and all were inhabited.

In 1871 the population of the townland was 37, being 19 males and 18 females. There were six houses in the townland, all were inhabited.

In 1881 the population of the townland was 45, being 27 males and 18 females. There were seven houses in the townland, all were inhabited.

In 1891 the population of the townland was 45, being 27 males and 18 females. There were seven houses in the townland, all were inhabited.

In the 1901 census of Ireland, there are eight families listed in the townland.

In the 1911 census of Ireland, there are nine families listed in the townland.

A native of the townland, Miss Mary McGovern, survived the RMS Titanic disaster in 1912. As a result, she was later given the nickname Mary 'Titanic' McGovern to distinguish her from the other McGoverns in the townland. She was aged 22 at the time and held a third class ticket, No. 330931, for which she paid £7 12s 7d. She embarked at Queenstown (now Cobh), County Cork bound for New York City. She was rescued in lifeboat No. 13, so it was not an unlucky number for her. She attributed her rescue to Saint Máedóc of Ferns as she carried soil from his church on Templeport Island with her, a traditional preventative against drowning.

Another distinguished native was Patrick McGovern (Irish politician), a Fine Gael TD in the Irish Parliament.

There are no structures of historical interest in the townland.

== See also ==
- Passengers of the RMS Titanic
- Patrick McGovern (Irish politician)
