= Brackley Lough =

- Loch na Breaclaí (Irish)
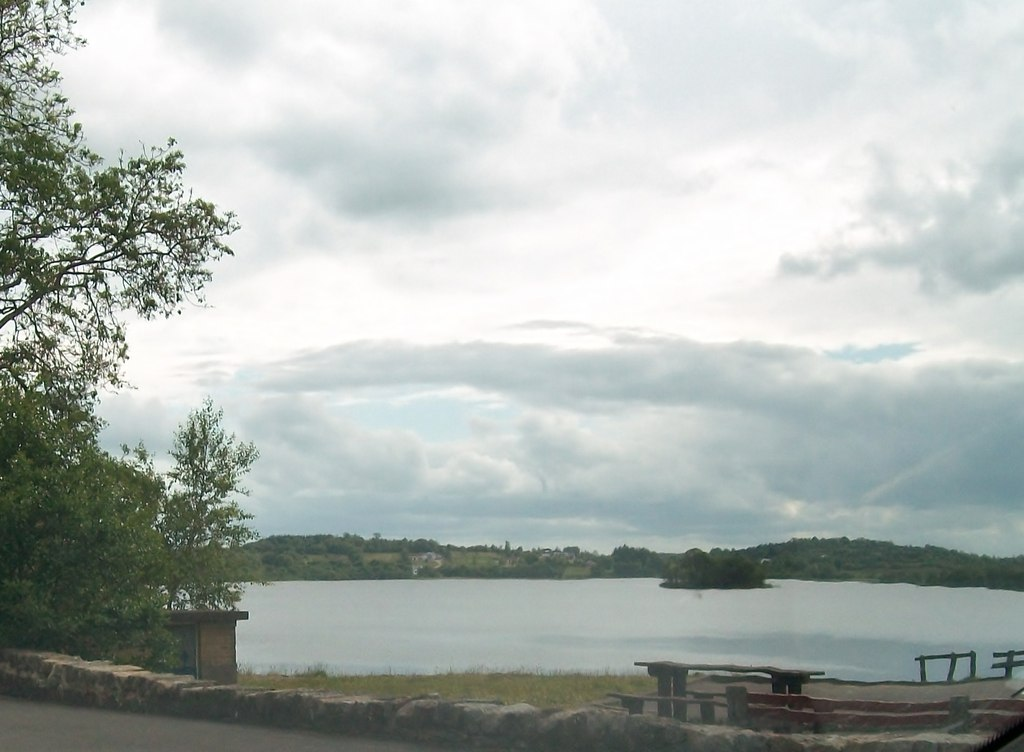

- Location within Ireland
- Location: County Cavan, Ireland
- Coordinates: 54.134876°N 7.706481°W
- Lake type: natural freshwater lake
- Primary outflows: none
- Basin countries: Ireland
- Max. length: 2.1 kilometres (1.3 mi)
- Max. width: 0.95 kilometres (0.59 mi)
- Surface area: 1.67 km^{2} (0.64 sq mi)
- Surface elevation: 61 m (200 ft)
- Islands: Baron's Island, one other islet
- Settlements: Bawnboy

Brackley Lough or Lough Brackley is a lake in County Cavan, Ireland, found to the west of the N87. It feeds into the River Blackwater, County Cavan.

== Wildlife ==
Brackley Lough is a pike, roach and bream fishery.

== See also ==
- List of loughs in Ireland
