= River Blackwater, County Cavan =

River in County Cavan, Ireland

Coordinates: 54°04′03″N 7°40′35″W

The River Blackwater (Irish: Abhainn Dubh) rises in the Cuilcagh Mountains, in the townland of Gowlan, Parish of Killinagh, Barony of Tullyhaw, County Cavan. It then flows in a south-east direction and ends in Ballymagauran Lough. It has a fish population of brown trout, pike and perch. The earliest mention of the river is in poems in the Book of Magauran dating to the 1350s.
