= Cluain Conmaicne =

Early people of Ireland

The Cluain Conmhaicne (Conmaicne of the pasture), or Cluain Conmaicne, were an early people of Ireland. Their tuath comprised the entire parish of Cloone, located in the baronies of Maigh Rein (Mohill) and Carrigallen, in south County Leitrim.

== Origin ==
The Conmhaicne or Conmaicne were a people of early Ireland, perhaps related to the Laigin, who dispersed to various parts of Ireland. They settled in Connacht and Longford, giving their name to several Conmaicne territories. Other branches of the Conmhaicne located in County Leitrim included the Conmaicne of Maigh Rein, Maigh Nissi, and Conmaicne Luchan.

== Territory ==
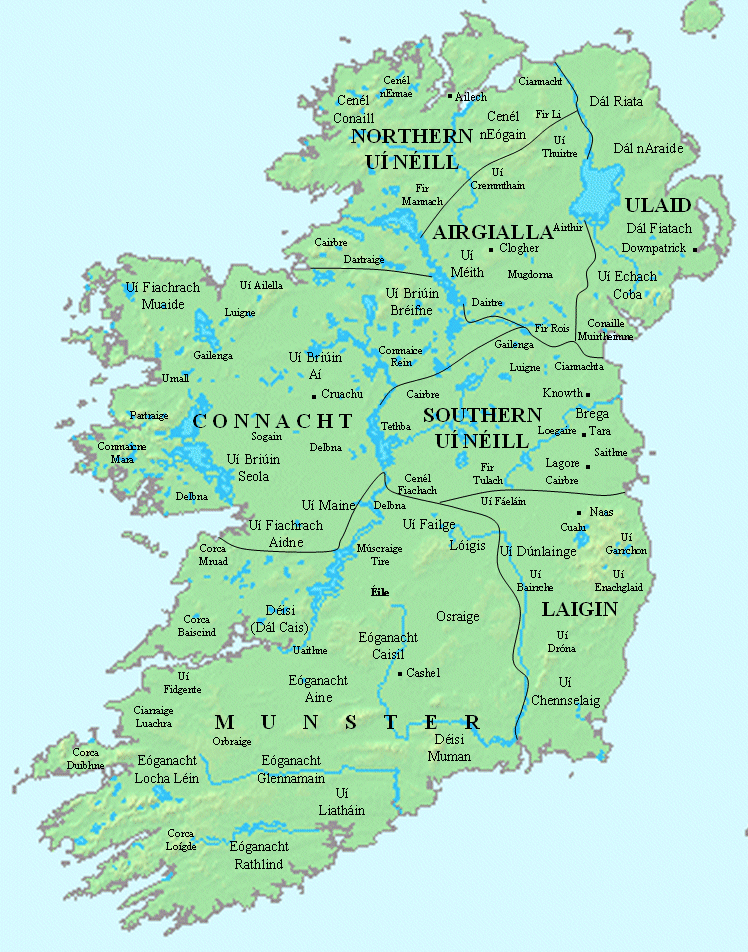
Early peoples and kingdoms of Ireland, c.800

Their territory was bounded by native Irish forests on all sides, Conmaiche of Maigh Rein west, Conmaicne of Maigh Nissi south, Conmaicne of Angaile to the east, and Breifne O'Reilly to the north.

== Taoiseach ==
Cluain Conmaicne was part of Muintir Eolais and therefore ruled by MagRaghnaill (Reynolds).

== People ==
- Saint Berach was born at Gort na Luachra in Cloone Conmaicne, living with this tuath for seven years. Plummer states that, in 1922, the townland contains "a mother-church and a cross, and the stone on which St. Berach was born".
- Saint Midabaria, sister of Berach, was also born at Gort na Luachra in Cloone Conmaicne.

== See also ==
- Conmhaicne
- Cloone
