= Cenel Luacháin =

People of early Ireland

The Cenél Luacháin (lit. 'race of Luachán') were a branch of the Conmaicne, an early people of Ireland, whose tuath comprised the parishes of Oughteragh and Drumreilly in the barony of Carrigallen, southern County Leitrim.

== Origin ==
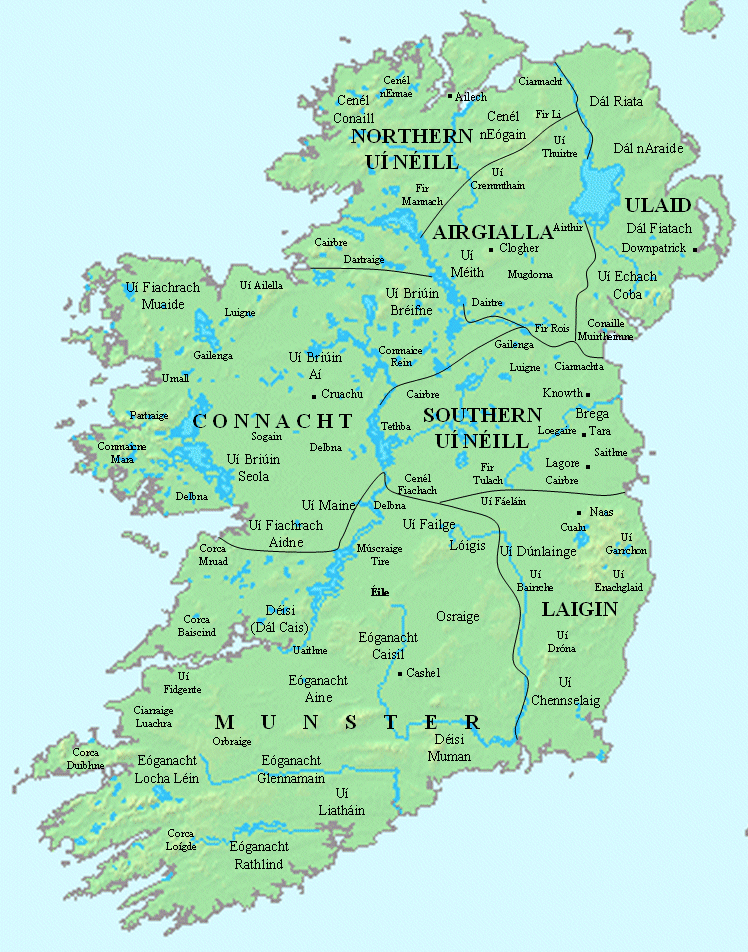
Early peoples and kingdoms of Ireland, c.800

The Conmaicne were a people of early Ireland, perhaps related to the Laigin, dispersed to various parts of Ireland. Settling in Connacht and Longford, they gave their name to several territories. After the sixth century, the Conmaicne Réin came from the south to the region, west of Lough Garadice, and some septs settled at Cenél Luacháin, Cluain Conmaicne, Maigh Rein, and Maigh Nissi, overrunning and absorbing the existing inhabitants called the Masraige.

=== Luachán ===
Luachán was a personal name which refers to Luachán, son of Onchu.

== Territory ==
Centered in Oughteragh parish, barony of Carrigallen, southern county Leitrim, their territory was bounded by native Irish forests on all sides, Sliabh an Iarainn west and north, Tullyhaw north east, and Conmaicne of Maigh Rein to the south. In the eighth century, when Ua Bruin Breifne claimed large swaths of north Connacht, some Cenél Luacháin migrated to Tethbae.

== Septs ==
Sept or tribal names of the Cenél Luacháin, in north east south Leitrim, are listed.

- Ui Dubain (Devine)
- Mac Maelfabhaill (O'Mullaville, Lavelle)
- Ui Bathbairr (O'Kearon or O'Kerrane or O'Kerrivane or O'Kerwan or O'Kirrane)
- Tullach Cleirig (O'Kearon or O'Kerrane or O'Kerrivane or O'Kerwan or O'Kirrane)
- Ui Braci (O'Kearon or O'Kerrane or O'Kerrivane or O'Kerwan or O'Kirrane)
- Tullach Maelfinnen
- Ui Buidbhin
- Ui Chailti
- Ui Cianacian
- Ui Conbhuidhe
- Ui Damaigh
- Ui Dimusaigh
- Ui Dubhain (their seat was Inis Doiri Dubhain)
- Ui Erailb
- Ui Eturrai
- Ui Gabhadain
- Ui MAelpatraig
- Ui Maelsuthain
- Ui Muinechain
- Ui Tredmain.
- Teallach Tanaidhe.

== Taoiseach ==
The Mac Dorchaids (Darcy, Mac Dorcy) were the chief family. Ua Cuaggain and Ua Tormadain are noted as chiefs in 1159.

"The MacDarchaids, Dorchys, or Darcys as the name is now Anglicised, derive their descent from Luchain, or Duchain, otherwise Dubhchain, of the race of Fergus M'Roy. According to John O'Dugan and the Four Masters, the M'Dorchys were chief the country denominated Cinel Luachain, which was co-extensive with the parish of Oughteragh in the barony of Carrigallen, and county of Leitrim, containing about 16,000 statue acres, watered by the Oughteragh stream. By O'Dugan they are thus mentioned: M'Dorchy, whose tribe is not enslaved, Rules over the heroic Cinel Luchain.".

== Rectory of Cinél Luacháin ==
The parish of Drumreilly derives its name from Druim Airbhealaigh "the ridge of the eastern pass". The parish is centered on the medieval island church in Lough Garadice, whose ruins are extant today. All churches of the parish, and one townland, inherited the parish name.

The parish of Oughteragh contained a church located on a high hill one kilometre north of present-day Ballinamore. The church, and nearby holy well, were dedicated to Saint Brigid. There was a hospital teach spidel dedicated to Saint John the Baptist, located at the (Ballinamore) ford over the Yellow River.

Both parishes were joined together to form the "Rectory of Cinél Luacháin". This is confirmed by the Annates for 1423 (p. 230) which state "rectoria parrochialium ecclesirum de Drumreilly et Oughteragh alias de Kenel Luchan vulgariter nuncupata". The rectory corresponded with the territory of the Conmaicne of Luachain.

== See also ==
- Ballinamore
