= Conmaicne Angaile =

Early people of Ireland

The Conmaicne Angaile (later Conmhaicne Anghaile; the 'Conmhaicne descended from Angaile') were an early people of Ireland. Their tuath comprised the territory of Annaly, now County Longford.

== Origin ==
The Conmhaicne were a people of early Ireland, perhaps related to the Laigin, who dispersed to various parts of Ireland. They settled in Connacht and Longford, giving their name to several Conmaicne territories. Other branches of the Conmhaicne were located in County Galway, Roscommon, Mayo, and Leitrim.

== Territory ==
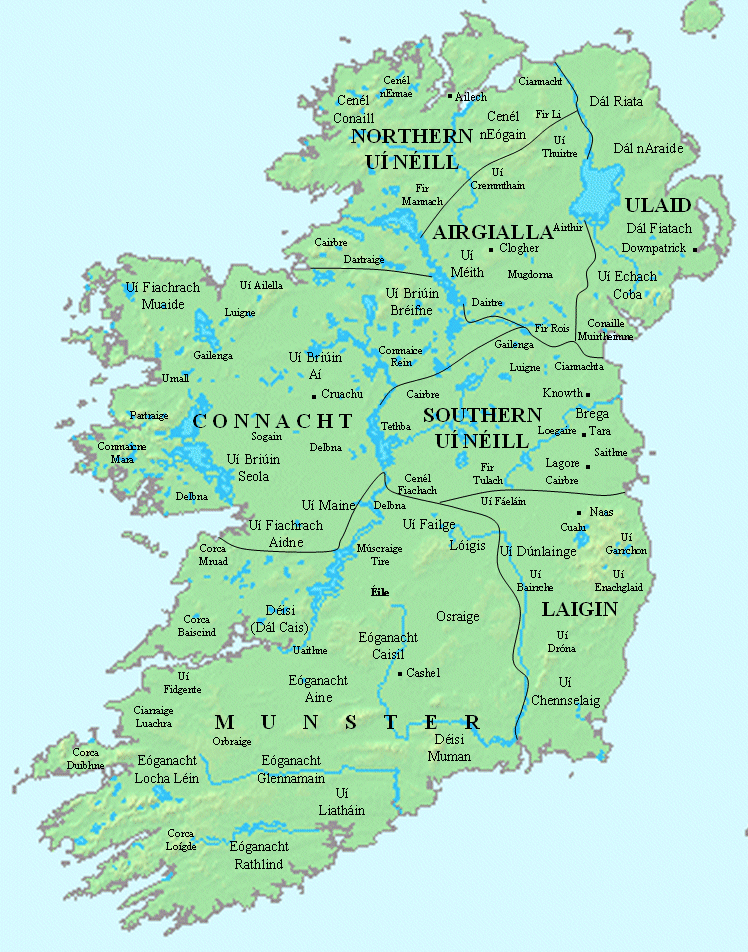
Early peoples and kingdoms of Ireland, c.800

Their territory was bounded by native Irish forests in places, by the River Shannon and Conmaicne of Maigh Rein to the east, Breifne O'Reilly to the north, and Leinster to the east.

== Taoiseach ==
The chief Conmaicne family were the Ó Fearghail, who descended from the great-grandson of Angaile.

== Diocese ==
The Diocese of the Conmaicne (or Ardagh) was established in 1111 as the see for east Connacht. Fourteen years later, at the Synod of Kells-Mellifont, its area was reduced to the territory of the Conmaicne in County Longford and south County Leitrim.
