= Lisroughty =

Townland in County Leitrim, Ireland

Lisroughty (from Irish Lios Robhartaigh, meaning ' 'The Ring-Fort of Robhartach', named after the large earthen fort in the north-west of the townland'), is a townland in the civil parish of Drumreilly, Roman Catholic parish of Carrigallen, Carrigallen, County Leitrim, Ireland. Until the Ordnance Survey of 1836, the townland was situate in the barony of Tullyhaw, County Cavan.

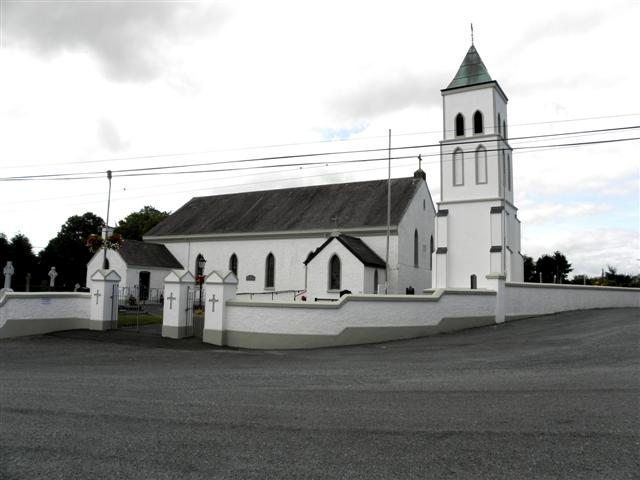
St Patricks RC Church, Aughawillan (geograph 3610884)

== Geography ==
Lisroughty is bounded on the north by Leckan townland, on the west by Crockawaddy townland and on the east by Lisgruddy and Lislahy townlands. Its chief geographical features are streams, forestry plantations, a stone quarry and dug wells. The townland is traversed by minor roads and rural lanes. The area of Lisroughty is 149 statute acres.

== History ==
An Inquisition in 1607 spells the name as Leth Carrowelysseroughty.

A Plantation of Ulster grant dated 1611 spells the name as Lisroerty.

The 1652 Commonwealth Survey spells the name as Lisroghty.

The 1665 Down Survey map depicts it as Lisroarfe.

The 1680 Books of Survey and Distribution spell the name as Lisroartye

An Inquisition held in Dromahair, County Leitrim on 22 July 1607 described the boundaries of Leitrim as including- The half-quarter of McGawran's country called Leth Carrowelysseroughty. This is an Anglicisation of the Irish- 'Leathcheathrú Lios Robhartaigh', meaning The half-quarterland of Lisroughty.

In the Plantation of Ulster by grant dated 16 August 1611, King James VI and I granted, inter alia, to Thomas Johnes, gentleman, Lisroerty 2 polls.

The 1652 Commonwealth Survey lists the proprietor of the townland as Lt. Col. Berisforde and his tenants as Cormucke Modderha and M. Tihreeny.

In the Hearth Money Rolls compiled on 29 September 1663 it is spelled Liscortie and lists the taxpayers as Patricke McEfrirragh, Cormacke McEturiny and Patricke McMartin.

A grant dated 3 November 1666 was made by King Charles II of England to the aforesaid Sir Tristram Beresford, 1st Baronet which included, inter alia, Lisroarty containing 246 acres. By grant dated 11 September 1670 from King Charles II of England to said Sir Tristram Beresford, the said lands of Liswarty were included in the creation of a new Manor of Beresford. A map of the Beresford estate drawn in 1831 spells the name as Lisroughty.

The 1790 Cavan Carvaghs list spells the townland name as Lissrorty.

The Tithe Applotment Books for 1827 spells the name as Lisroughty or Newtown and lists six tithepayers in the townland.

Griffith's Valuation of 1857 lists six landholders in the townland.

The landlords of Lisroughty in the 19th century were Lord John Beresford (the Anglican Archbishop of Armagh) and Laurence Dolan.

John O'Hart in his 1892 book Irish pedigrees; or, The origin and stem of the Irish nation, lists the genealogy of the Dolan family of Lisroughty.

== Census ==
Year	Population	Males	Females	Total Houses	Uninhabited
1841	35	17	18	7	0
1851	20	12	8	5	1
1861	22	9	13	5	0
1871	24	9	15	5	0
1881	18	7	11	4	0
1891	23	9	14	4	0

In the 1901 census of Ireland, there are three families listed in the townland.

In the 1911 census of Ireland, there are seven families listed in the townland.

== Antiquities ==
1. An earthen ringfort, after which the townland is named.
2. Saint Patrick’s Roman Catholic Chapel and graveyard. Although it is called Aghawillan Church, it is actually situated in Lisroughty. It was erected c.1830 to replace an old thatched chapel in Corramahan. The new one was also thatched, measuring 74 ft by 24 ft by 9 ft. It had a clay floor and the congregation had to bring a flat stone to Mass to kneel on as the floor was wet. In the 19th century the murderer of Captain McLeod hid his gun in the church. The present chapel was erected in 1869 by Fr. Patrick Galligan, at a right angle to the location of the old one. Improvements were made in 1935. It was rededicated after renovations on 12 October 1952. The novelist John McGahern is buried in the graveyard.
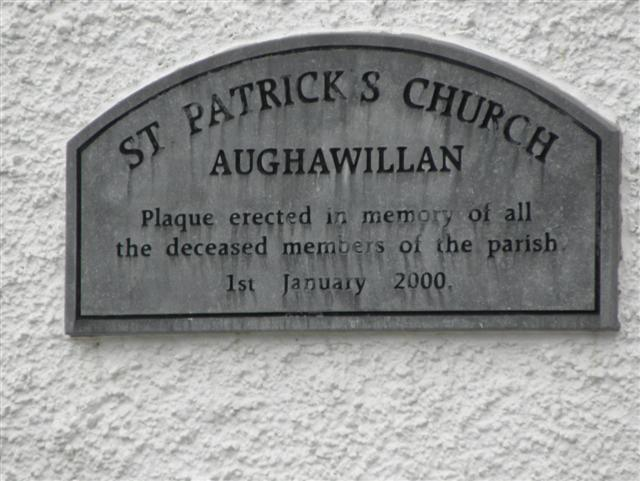
  Plaque, St Patricks Church (geograph 3610887)
