= Saint Berach =

Irish saint

Berach of Cluain Coirpthe
- Born: unknown Ireland
- Died: 595; Ireland
- Venerated in: Roman Catholic Church, Eastern Orthodox Church
- Feast: 15 February
- Patronage: Termonbarry

Saint Berach of Termonbarry (died 595) was a celebrated Irish saint, whose memory is still celebrated in County Roscommon. He was a disciple of Saint Kevin.

== Life ==
Berach, and his sister Midabaria, were born at Gort na Luachra in Cluain Conmaicne, now in County Leitrim. His father was of the tribe of Cinel Dobtha, otherwise O'Hanley of Doohey Hanley, and his mother belonged to the Conmaicne tribe. After his seventh birthday, Berchan was brought to Daigh mac Cairill at Inishkeen, now in county Monaghan, to study.

After completing his novitiate, Bercan moved to the Diocese of Elphin where he later built the church at Cluain Coirpthe, now known as Termonbarry or Kilbarry. Berach's sister, Saint Midabaria, was abbess of a nunnery at Bumlin (Strokestown), of which she is venerated as patroness.

Under the title of "Berach of Cluain Coirpthe" St. Berach is honoured in several martyrologies, and his holy life attracted pilgrims to Kilbarry from all parts of Ireland. The MacCoilidh family, whose name was anglicized to Cox in the early years of the seventeenth century, were hereditary custodians of St. Berach's crosier, and were considered as 'lay abbots' of Kilbarry. The crosier is now in the Dublin Museum.

One account of Berach's life has him travel to Aberfoyle in Mentieth, Scotland to seek the adjudication of Áedán mac Gabráin in a land dispute.

St. Berach's oratory at Cluain Coirpthe was replaced by a damhliag (stone church), built by MacCoilidh and O'Hanley in 916, and acquired the name of Termon Barry, or Kilbarry, that is the church of St. Berach.

Some authorities give his feast as 11 February, but most martyrologists assign him 15 February. Kilbarrack Church, County Dublin, was also named after this saint, as in his early days he spent some time there and performed many miracles, duly recorded in his life. His bell was long preserved at the Abbey of Glendalough but has disappeared since the sixteenth century.

In 1890, Dr. M. F. Cox, of Dublin, the lineal representative of the MacCoilidhs, unearthed St. Berach's boat, and had it placed beside the present Catholic church of Whitehall, near Kilbarry.

Saint Berach is the patron saint of the Irish town Termonbarry (Kulberry).
