= Garryfliugh =

Townland in County Cavan, Ireland

Coordinates: 54.07514°N 7.810271°W

Garryfliugh (from Irish Garraidh fliuch, meaning- The Wet Garden) is a townland in the civil parish of Drumreilly, barony of Tullyhaw, County Cavan, Ireland.

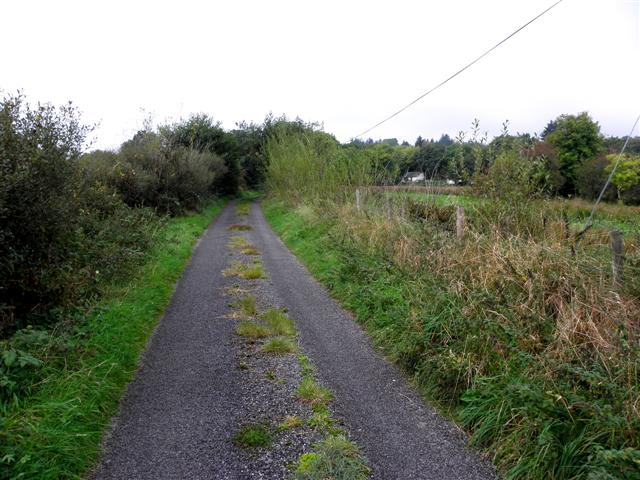
Road at Garryfliugh (geograph 3679582)

== Geography ==
Garryfliugh is bounded on the west by Doon (Drumreilly), Knockfin and Seltanahunshin townlands and on the east by Ardmoneen, Corraleehanbeg and Drumderg townlands. Its chief geographical features are Sliabh an Iarainn mountain on whose eastern slope it lies, reaching a height of 1,250 feet, a waterfall, forestry plantations, woods, mountain streams and dug wells. It is traversed by minor public roads and rural lanes. The townland covers 304 statute acres.

== History ==
The Battle of Magh Slecht took place in the townland in 1256 between the O’Rourkes and the O’Reillys. Dead bodies from the battle are sometimes discovered buried in the townland.

The landlord of Garryfliugh in the 19th century was the Beresford Estate.

The Tithe Applotment Books for 1834 spells the name as Garfullagh and list five tithepayers in the townland.

Griffith's Valuation of 1857 lists eleven landholders in the townland.

== Census ==
Year	Population	Males	Females	Total Houses	Uninhabited
1841	79	44	35	12	0
1851	43	19	24	8	0
1861	61	27	34	8	0
1871	61	29	32	10	0
1881	58	31	27	10	0
1891	28	14	14	7	0

In the 1901 census of Ireland, there were ten families listed in the townland.

In the 1911 census of Ireland, there were ten families listed in the townland.

== Antiquities ==
1. Stone bridges over the streams
2. Stepping-stones over the stream
