= Cumhscraidh mac Céacht =

Cumhscraidh mac Céacht, was according to medieval Irish legend and historical tradition, Irish King.

Cumhscraidh was a ten-time great-grandson of Lugaid mac Con. According to the genealogies, The Conmaicne of Cúl converge around Cumhscraidh. This would make him the ancestor of the Conmaicne Cúil Tolad, who were located along the border of County Galway - County Mayo. Notables descended from him include Cruimthear Mac Carthaigh, Jarlath of Tuam and some of the abbots of Clonmacnoise.
