= Seltanahunshin =

Townland in County Leitrim, Ireland

Seltanahunshin (Irish derived place name, either Sailtean na hUinseann meaning 'The Wood of the Sallows and Ash Trees' or Sailten na n-Gasán meaning the 'Sally-Wood of the Paths') is a townland in the civil parish of Oughteragh, barony of Carrigallen, County Leitrim, Ireland.

== Geography ==
Seltanahunshin is bounded on the north by Doon (Drumreilly) townland, on the south by Tullylackan Beg townland, on the west by Altakeeran and Slievenakilla townlands and on the east by Curraghnabania, Garryfliugh and Knockfin townlands. Its chief geographical features are Sliabh an Iarainn mountain, reaching a height of 1,251 feet, the Yellow River, waterfalls, forestry plantations, small streams and river swallow holes. Seltanahunshin is traversed by minor public roads and rural lanes. The townland covers 819 statute acres.

== History ==
The Battle of Magh Slecht took place in the townland in 1256 between the O’Rourkes and the O’Reillys. Dead bodies from the battle are sometimes discovered buried in the surrounding townlands.

The Annals of the Four Masters state- A party of the O'Reilly family were slain by Hugh, the son of Felim O'Conor, namely, Cathal O'Reilly, Lord of Muintir-Maelmora, and of all the race of Hugh Finn; his two sons, namely, Donnell Roe and Niall; his brother, Cuconnaught; the three sons of Cathal Duff O'Reilly, namely, Godfrey, Farrell, and Donnell; Annadh, son of Donnell O'Reilly, who was slain by Conor Mac Tiernan; Niall, i.e. the Caech Monoculus O'Reilly; Tiernan Mac Brady; Gilla-Michael Mac Taichligh; Donough O'Biobhsaigh; Manus, son of Mac Gilduff; and upwards of sixty others of the chiefs of their people were slain along with them. This engagement is called the Battle of Moy Slecht, and was fought on the margin of Athderg, at Alt-na-heillte, over Bealach-na-beithe. The O'Reillys, however, slew a number of the chiefs of the opposite forces, namely, Dermot O'Flanagan, Flann Mageraghty, Murrough Finn, O'Farrell, and many others besides: their glaslaiths recruits even forced the van of the adverse army to give way three times, but they were at length overpowered by the main body. It was at Sailtean-na-nGasan that the van of that army first came up with the O'Reillys, from which place they pursued them to Ait-Tighe-Mec-Cuirrin, and from thence to the field of the great battle.

The Annals of Loch Cé state- A prodigious hosting was made by Walter, son of Richard, son of William Burk, against Fedhlim, son of Cathal Crobhderg, and against his son, i.e. Aedh son of Fedhlim, and to the sons of Tighernan O'Ruairc; and it was a very long time before since a host so numerous as this was assembled in Erinn, for it was reckoned that there were in it twenty thousand to a man. And these great hosts marched to Magh-Eó of the Saxons, and from thence to Balla, and from thence throughout Luighne; and they plundered Luighne on all sides about them. And they came to Achadh-Conaire, and despatched messengers from thence to Muinter-Raighilligh, and requested them to come to meet them to Cros-Doire-chaein, at the eastern end of Brat-sliabh in Tir-Tuathail. And Muinter-Raighilligh came to Clachan-mucadha on Sliabh-an-iarainn, and then turned back without having obtained a meeting from the Foreigners, and went from thence to Soilten-gasan. And it was on the same day, viz.:—Friday in particular, and the festival of the Cross above all days, that Conchobhar, son of Tighernan O'Ruairc, mustered the men of Breifne and the Conmaicne, and as many as he could secure along with them, including Aedh O'Conchobhair and the nobles of Connacht, and the Síl-Muiredhaigh besides. And the bravest on this hosting were these, viz.:—Conchobhar; son of Tighernan O'Ruairc, i.e. king of Uí-Briuin and Conmaicne, and Cathal O'Flaithbhertaigh, and Murchadh Finn O'Ferghail, and Ruadh-in-fhedha O'Floinn, and Flann Mac Oirechtaigh, and Donn Og Mac Oirechtaigh, and a great number of Síl-Ceallaigh, and the three sons of Mac Diarmada, and Diarmaid O'Flannagain, and Cathal, son of Duarcan O'hEghra, and the two sons of Tighernan O'Conchobhair, and Gilla-na-naemh O'Taidhg. And great, indeed, was the number of the young men of Connacht there besides. And where the van of this host overtook Muinter-Raighilligh was at Soilten-gasan, and they followed them to Alt-tighe-Mic-Cuirrin, where the recruits of Muinter-Raighilligh turned upon this separate host, and three times routed them. Then the great army came up with them, after some of their people had been slain, along with Diarmaid O'Flannagain, and Mac Maenaigh, and Coicle O'Coicle, and many more; and these several armies all marched to Alt-na-hélti (The Height of the Doe), and to Doirin-cranncha, between Ath-na-beithighe and Bél-in-bhealaigh, and between Coill-essa and Coill-airther on Sliabh-an-iarainn, where Muinter-Raighilligh turned sternly, earnestly, furiously, wildly, irrepressibly, against the son of Fedhlim and all the Connachtmen who were along with him, to avenge upon them their wrongs and oppressions; and each party then incited their people against the other, i.e. the battalion of the Uí-Briuin and the Connachtmen. Then the Connachtmen arose on one side of the battle—a bold, expert, precipitate, impetuous band—and arrayed themselves in a glistening, flaming, quick-handed phalanx, and in close, steady, united bodies, under the valiant, strong-armed heir, i.e. Aedh, son of Fedhlim, son of Cathal Crobhderg. (And, certainly, the son of the chief king had the glowing fury of a prince, the firmness of a champion, and the valour of a lion, on that day.) And a brave, destructive, heroic battle was fought between them respectively in that hour; and multitudes were killed and wounded, here and there, on both sides. And Conchobhar, son of Tighernan, king of Breifne, and Murchadh Finn O'Ferghail, and Aedh O'Ferghail, and Maelruanaidh Mac Donnchadha, were left there; and many more persons were wounded on the spot; and a number of them died of their wounds in their houses, including Murchadh Finn O'Ferghail, and including Flann Mac Oirechtaigh, who was slain in the counter-wounding of the battle, and many more along with him. However, the witnesses of this great battle say that neither the warriors of these bands, nor the champions of the great victory, could gaze at the face of the arch-prince, for there were two broad-eyed, enormous, royal torches flaming and rolling in his head; and every one feared to address him at the time, for he was as far as the voice could reach before the hosts, advancing against the battalions of the Uí-Briuin. And he raised aloud his battle cry of a chief king, and his champion's shout, in the middle of the great battle, and desisted not from this career and onset until the battalion of the Uí-Briuin was routed. However, there were slain on that field Cathal O'Raighilligh, king of Muinter-Mael-mordha and the descendants of Aedh Finn, together with his two sons, viz.:—Domhnall Ruadh and Niall; and his brother, i.e. Cuconnacht; and the three sons of Cathal Dubh O'Raighilligh, viz.:—Goffraigh, and Ferghal, and Domhnall; and Annadh, son of Domhnall O'Raighilligh, who was killed by Conchobhar, son of Tighernan; and the Caech O'Raighilligh, i.e. Niall; and Tighernan Mac Bradaigh; and Gillamichil Mac Taichligh; and Donnchadh O'Bibhsaigh; and Maghnus Mac Gilladhuibh; and over three score of the best of their people along with them; and sixteen men of the Uí-Raighilligh were slain there besides. The battle of Magh-Slecht, on the brink of Ath-derg, at Alt-na-helti, over Bealach-na-beithighe, is the name of this battle.

The Annals of Connacht state- A huge army was raised by Walter son of Richard Burke to attack Fedlim mac Cathail Chrobdeirg and Aed his son and Conchobar son of Tigernan O Ruairc, an army which for might and multitude had never been surpassed in Ireland, for it numbered twenty thousand to a man. They came to Mayo and Balla and passed through Leyney, which they plundered on all sides, to Achonry; and from there they sent messengers to the Ui Raigillig, bidding them to come and meet them at Cros Dairi Cain at the eastern end of the Brauslieve mountains in Tir Thuathail. The Ui Raigillig came to Clachan Mucada on Slieve Anierin, but turned back from there, not having effected a meeting with the Galls, and came to Soltin Gasain. And on that same day—a Friday, and the feast of Crosses in fact—Conchobar son of Tigernan O Ruairc mustered the men of Brefne and Conmaicne and all whom he could get, including Aed son of Fedlim O Conchobair and the chiefs of the Sil Murray and the rest of the men of Connacht. Now these are the best men that were with him:— Conchobair son of Tigernan O Ruairc king of Brefne, Cathal O Flaithbertaig, Murchad Finn O Fergail, Ruad in Feda O Flainn, Flann Mag Oirechtaig and Donn Oc, O Cellaig, the three sons of Mac Diarmata, Diarmait O Flannacain, Cathal son of Duarcan O hEgra, the two sons of Tigernan O Conchobair and Gilla na Naem O Taidc. But there were many of the youth of Connacht there besides these. The van of this host came upon the Ui Raigillig at Sailten Gassan and pursued them to Alt Tige Meg Currin. Here the new levies of the Muinter Raigillig turned upon this joint force and broke them thrice. The main army came up with them after [some of] their men had been killed: Diarmait O Flannacain, Mac Maenaig, Coiclid O Coiclid and a number of others; and the combined armies came to Alt na hElti and Doirin Cranncha, between Ath na Betige and Bel in Belaig and Coill Esa and Coill Airthir, on Slieve Anierin. And here the Muinter Raigillig turned hardily, eagerly, wildly, strenuously, irrepressibly, to attack Fedlim's son and to avenge their injuries and oppression on him, and each chieftain exhorted his followers to go against the Connacht army. Then rose up the Connachtmen on the other side of the battle, and a comely, quick, hot and hasty company were they. They ranged themselves in a burning, blazing, active, fiery throng, a phalanx stout and stable, round Aed mac Fedlim, that strong sturdy prince, and on that day the high-king's son showed a ruler's fury, a champion's endurance, a lion's prowess. A fierce furious felling fight was joined then between the two hosts, many were killed and wounded on either side: Conchobar son of Tigernan [O Ruairc] king of Brefne, Murchad Finn O Fergail, Maelruanaid Mac Donnchada and many others were wounded on that field and some of them, among whom was Murchad O Fergail, died of their wounds at home; while Flann Mag Oirechtaig was killed in the recoil of the battle, and many more with him. However, those who have knowledge of this great battle relate that the warriors of the host on that field could not look in the face of the high lord, for two great wideglancing torches were flaming and flashing in his head, so that all feared to speak with him; for he was within hailing-distance in front of the armies as they approached the forces of the Ui Briuin; and he uttered his high-king's war-cry and his champion's shout in the midst of the fight and never stopped on that charge and onset until the ranks of the Ui Briuin were scattered. But there were killed there Cathal O Raigillig, king of Muinter Mailmorda and Cath Aeda Finn, Domnall Ruad and Niall his sons, and Cu Chonnacht his brother; the three sons of Cathal Dub O Ruairc, Gofraid, Fergal and Domnall; Annad son of Domnall O Raigillig, killed by Conchobar son of Tigernan O Ruairc; Niall, that is in Caech O Raigillig; Tigernan Mag Brataig and Gilla Micheil son of Taichlech and Donnchad O Bibsaig; Magnus Mac Gilla Duib, and more than three score of their chief men besides. Sixteen of the Ui Raigillig themselves were also killed there. The Battle of Mag Slecht at the brink of Ath Derg, at Allt na hElti above Belach na Bethige—that is the name of this battle.

The Annals of Ulster state- The Muinnter-Raghallaigh were killed by Aedh, son of Feidhlimidh Ua Conchobuir (and by Conchubur, son of Tigernan Ua Ruairc). Namely, those killed were Cathal and Domnall and Cu-Connacht and the Blind Gillie and Geoffrey Ua Raghallaigh and all the nobles of Muinnter-Raghallaigh and the Ui-Briuin on one spot at Allt-na-heillti, over Belach-na-Beithighe, in front of Sliabh-in-iarainn. Muinnter-Raghallaigh killed Diarmait Ua Flannagain and Flann Mag Oirechtaigh and Murehadh Ua Ferghail the Fair. They likewise wounded and killed many other persons that are not reckoned here.

The 1657 map of John Carkas spells the name as Seltenahensken and lists the tenant as Teige McTerman O’Donnell .

The 1665 Down Survey map depicts the townland as Stiltenahenshen.

By a grant from King Charles II on 6 November 1667, the lands of Sheltinehincken containing 137 acres 1 rood 24 perches was granted, inter alia, to Captain Hugh Montgomery and Hugh Campbell at an annual rent of £1-7s-9 3/4d.

The 1685 Books of Survey and Distribution spell the name as Sellenahensken.

William Petty's 1685 map spells the name as Siltenahenshen.

The Tithe Applotment Books for 1834 spells the name as Seltinahinch and list three tithepayers in the townland.

The Seltanahunshin Valuation Office Field books are available for 1841.

Griffith's Valuation of 1857 lists seven landholders in the townland. The landlord of the townland in the 19th century was the Anglican Bishop of Kilmore.

The book Bawnboy and Templeport History, Heritage, Folklore by Chris Maguire, states (quoting from the 1920s Anglo-Celt placename articles of R.V. Walker)- "Enormous gatherings, with no religious observations attached, were held on 'Garland Sunday', the last Sunday of July (locally 'Domhnach Sunday' in place of "Black Crom’s Day") well into the twentieth century at Seltanahunsun".

== Census ==
| Year | Population | Males | Females | Total Houses | Uninhabited |
|---|---|---|---|---|---|
| 1841 | 39 | 22 | 17 | 7 | 0 |
| 1851 | 36 | 21 | 15 | 6 | 0 |
| 1861 | 33 | 15 | 18 | 5 | 0 |
| 1871 | 28 | 134 | 15 | 5 | 0 |
| 1881 | 35 | 21 | 14 | 6 | 0 |
| 1891 | 28 | 15 | 13 | 4 | 0 |

In the 1901 census of Ireland, there were six families listed in the townland.

In the 1911 census of Ireland, there were four families listed in the townland.

== Antiquities ==
1. Stone bridges over the river.
2. Stepping-stones across the river
