= Ardmoneen =

Townland in County Cavan, Ireland

Coordinates: 54.07514°N 7.810271°W

Ardmoneen (from Irish Ard Moinín meaning- The High Little Bog) is a townland in the civil parish of Drumreilly, barony of Tullyhaw, County Cavan, Ireland.

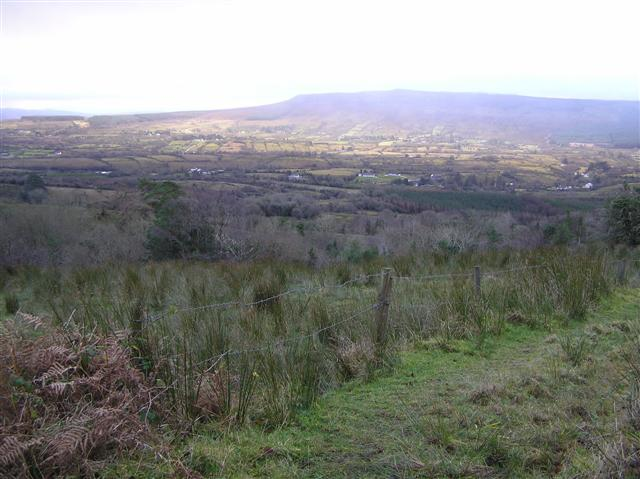
Ardmoneen Townland - geograph.org.uk - 1090027

== Geography ==
Ardmoneen is bounded on the north by Moher (Drumreilly) townland, on the west by Doon (Drumreilly) and Garryfliugh townlands and on the east by Drumderg townland. Its chief geographical features are Sliabh an Iarainn mountain on whose eastern slope it lies, reaching a height of 1,295 feet, forestry plantations, a wood, waterfalls, mountain streams, spring wells and dug wells. Ardmoneen is traversed by minor public roads and rural lanes. The townland covers 378 statute acres.

== History ==
The Battle of Magh Slecht took place in the townland in 1256 between the O’Rourkes and the O’Reillys. Dead bodies from the battle are sometimes discovered buried in the townland.

The landlord of Ardmoneen in the 19th century was the Beresford Estate. A map of the Beresford estate drawn in 1831 spells the name as Ardmoneen.

The Tithe Applotment Books for 1834 list fifteen tithepayers in the townland.

Griffith's Valuation of 1857 lists thirty landholders in the townland.

The 1913 Ordnance Survey map enlarged Ardmoneen by adding some of the land adjoining on the north side which had belonged to Moher townland in the 1836 OS map.

== Census ==
Year	Population	Males	Females	Total Houses	Uninhabited
1841	124	63	61	21	1
1851	85	44	41	16	0
1861	89	43	46	14	0
1871	84	42	42	18	0
1881	83	41	42	16	1
1891	94	50	44	18	1

In the 1901 census of Ireland, there were seventeen families listed in the townland.

In the 1911 census of Ireland, there were twenty families listed in the townland.

== Antiquities ==
1. Stepping stones over the streams.
2. Stone bridges over the streams
3. A foot-bridge over the stream.
4. Ardmoneen National School, Roll No. 9724. In 1874 there were two teachers, both Roman Catholics, receiving total annual salary of £38. There were 127 pupils, 69 boys and 58 girls. In 1886 there were two teachers, both Roman Catholics, receiving total annual salary of £78-17s-1d. There were 121 pupils, 62 boys and 59 girls. In 1890 there were 104 pupils. The pupils recorded local folklore in the Dúchas collection 1938.
