= Knockfin =

Townland in County Cavan, Ireland

Coordinates: 54.07514°N 7.810271°W

Knockfin (from Irish Cnoc Fionn, meaning- The White Hill) is a townland in the civil parish of Drumreilly, barony of Tullyhaw, County Cavan, Ireland.

== Geography ==
Knockfin is bounded on the west by Curraghnabania and Seltanahunshin townlands and on the east by Corraleehanbeg, Garryfliugh and Prabagh townlands. Its chief geographical features are Sliabh an Iarainn mountain on whose eastern slope it lies, mountain streams, waterfalls, a lime-kiln and dug wells. It is traversed by minor public roads and rural lanes. The townland covers 228 statute acres.

== History ==
The landlord of the townland in the 19th century was the Beresford Estate.

The Tithe Applotment Books for 1834 spells the name as Kockfin and list three tithepayers in the townland.

The 1836 Ordnance survey Namebooks state- The soil is light yellow clay intermixed with sand & limestone, neither of which is quarried or used in any way.

Griffith's Valuation of 1857 lists five landholders in the townland.

== Census ==
Year	Population	Males	Females	Total Houses	Uninhabited
1841	60	36	24	7	0
1851	33	16	17	5	0
1861	30	13	17	6	0
1871	46	24	22	6	0
1881	47	25	22	6	0
1891	41	18	23	5	0

In the 1901 census of Ireland, there were seven families listed in the townland.

In the 1911 census of Ireland, there were seven families listed in the townland.

== Antiquities ==
1. Stone bridges over the streams
