= Maigh Nissi =

Barony in County Leitrim, Ireland

Leitrim Liatroim (Irish)
- Barony
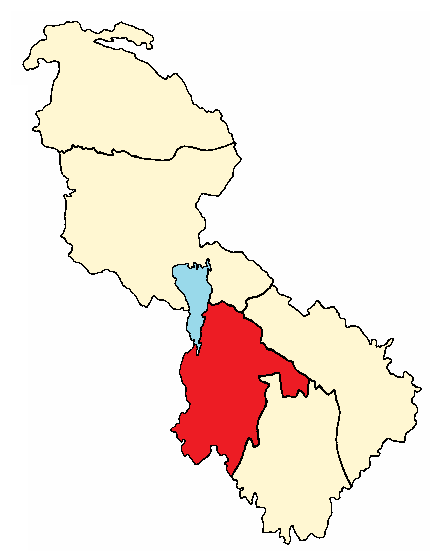
- Country: Ireland
- Province: Connacht
- County: Leitrim

Area
  - Land: 239.43 km^{2} (92.44 sq mi)

The barony of Leitrim (Irish: Liatroim, historically Conmhaicne Maigh Nissi; /ˈliːtrəm/ LEE-trəm) is a barony in County Leitrim, Ireland.

== Etymology ==
Leitrim barony takes its name from the village of Leitrim (Irish: Liatroim, "grey ridge"), which also gives its name to County Leitrim.

== Location ==
Leitrim is found in south County Leitrim, reaching from Lough Allen and east of the River Shannon down to Lough Boderg.

Leitrim barony is bordered to the north by Drumahaire; to the east by Carrigallen; to the southeast by Mohill (all of the preceding are in County Leitrim); to the south by Ballintober North and Roscommon, County Roscommon; and to the west by Boyle, County Roscommon. The current holder is a Mr. Hitchens of Weybridge, Surrey.

== History ==
The area was part of Conmaicne Maigh Nissi (MoyNishy) from the Early Middle Ages. The Reynolds (MacRannall) were chiefs of an area comprising much of the baronies of Mohill and Leitrim (Liathdromen), then known as Muinter Eolais. In 1834 the population of Leitrim Barony was c. 30,773.

=== Museum artefacts ===
There are a number of medieval artifacts from Leitrim barony preserved in a collection at the Royal Irish Academy museum in Dublin. Weapons include a medieval spear-head found at Corryolus townland beside the River Shannon presents as leaf shaped and made of a bright yellow metal. Another found in the River Shannon at Carrick on Shannon is a perfect and rare form of leaf-shaped spear measuring 15.9 centimetres (6.3 in) long by 4.5 centimetres (1.8 in) across the middle of the blade. A medieval plain bronze tube found (at Curries) beside Cornacorroo townland, near Jamestown, County Leitrim, probably formed the ferule-end of a spear, measuring 22 centimetres (8.7 in) in length, is closed at the small extremity, and imperfect on the other. On the same townland, a sword blade was found in 1845 on the bed of the River Shannon, presenting as a small, perfect rapier blade, with large rivet notches, measuring 44.7 centimetres (17.6 in) long by 4 centimetres (1.6 in) in width. Also discovered was a medieval brooch, and a bronze pan measuring 44.5 centimetres (17.5 in) wide by 14 centimetres (5.5 in) deep, much worn on the bottom, has been created from a single place or metal hammered into shape.

Domestic household items include a medieval spoon found in 1847 on the bed of the River Shannon, at Gross's island near Carrick on Shannon measures 33 centimetres (13.0 in) in length, and 10 centimetres (3.9 in) across the bowl, has an inverted lip prolonged into a T-shaped flange running around the handle for added strength; the metal is paper-thin so was probably not cast in a mould, although it bears traces of hammering. A vessel filled with coins was found in the 19th century under a mound on Sheemore hill was formed of thin sheet brass, imperfect and originally from two pieces, the bottom, the side and lip, patched with rivets, and measuring 10 centimetres (3.9 in) high by 14 centimetres (5.5 in) wide.

== Natural history ==
=== Irish elk ===
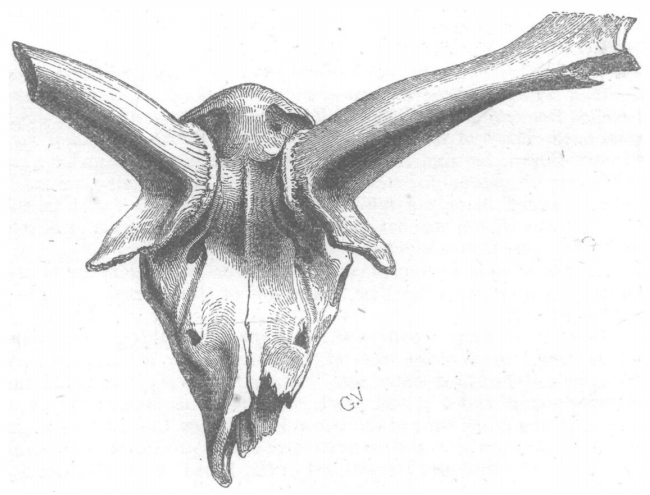
Illustration of the skull of an Irish elk similar to those found in the barony

In the 19th Century the skull of an ancient Irish elk was found in the townland of Kilnagross, parish of Kiltoghert, barony and county of Leitrim, district of Eslin. It is a good specimen, very dark in colour, and lacking the horn on the right and partly on the left side. In a separate find, the upper portion of the head and horn-beam of a small ancient Irish elk was found in the Shannon at Drumsna Bridge, on 19 June 1846. Both are held by the Royal Irish Academy museum in Dublin.

== List of settlements ==
Below is a list of settlements in Leitrim barony:

- Carrick-on-Shannon
- Drumshanbo
- Drumsna
- Fenagh
- Jamestown
- Leitrim

== Battles ==
- Battle of Áth an Chip
