= Doon (Drumreilly) =

Townland in County Cavan, Ireland

Coordinates: 54.07514°N 7.810271°W

Doon (from Irish Dún meaning- The Fort) is a townland in the civil parish of Drumreilly, barony of Tullyhaw, County Cavan, Ireland.

== Geography ==
Doon is bounded on the north by Derrynananta Upper townland, on the west by Moneensauran, Seltanahunshin and Slievenakilla townlands and on the east by Ardmoneen, Garryfliugh, Lannanerriagh and Moher (Drumreilly) townlands. Its chief geographical features are Bartonny Top mountain (Irish = Bharr an Tonnaigh = The Top of the Mound) which reaches a height of 411 metres, Bartonny Lough, mountain pools, the Yellow River, forestry plantations, small streams and river swallow holes. Doon is traversed by minor public roads and rural lanes. The townland covers 1,190 statute acres.

== History ==
The 1665 Down Survey map depicts the townland as Bartunny.

An Inquisition held in Cavan Town on 20 September 1630 found that, at the date of his death on 26 June 1625, Walter Talbot of Ballyconnell owned, inter alia, 2 polls in Bartony. The lands passed to his son James Talbot, born 1615.

An Inquisition held in Cavan Town on 24 October 1631 found that Brian Óg McGovern by deed of trust dated 20 November 1614 granted, inter alia, a half poll of land in Bartonny, to the use of himself and his wife Mary O'Birn and after their death for their son Edmond McGovern, born in 1616. The said Brian Óg McGovern died on 1 October 1631. He was the son of Brian Óg Mág Samhradháin who was chief of the McGovern clan until his death in 1584. On 30 April 1605 King James VI and I granted a pardon to him as Brian McGaran of Tolaghagh, for fighting against the King's forces. In the Plantation of Ulster he had been granted lands in Teeboy and Owengallees.

The aforesaid McGovern lands in Doon were confiscated in the Cromwellian Act for the Settlement of Ireland 1652 and were distributed as follows-

The 1652 Commonwealth Survey depicts the townland as Barratunny with the proprietor being Lieutenant-Colonel Tristram Beresford whose tenant was Owen McGulrick.

In the Hearth Money Rolls compiled on 29 September 1663 it is spelled Baretunny and lists the taxpayers as Laghlin Oge McKelagher, Tirlagh McKealagher, Hugh Macolricke and William O’Dolan.

A grant dated 3 November 1666 was made by King Charles II of England to the aforesaid Sir Tristram Beresford, 1st Baronet which included, inter alia, Bartumna alias Bartuna containing 595 acres. By grant dated 11 September 1670 from King Charles II of England to said Sir Tristram Beresford, the said lands of Bartumna alias Bartuna were included in the creation of a new Manor of Beresford. A map of the Beresford estate drawn in 1831 spells the name as Barratunnys.

In the Cavan Poll Book of 1761, there were two people registered to vote in Doon in the Irish general election, 1761: William Hamilton and William Jamison. They were each entitled to cast two votes. The four election candidates were Charles Coote, 1st Earl of Bellomont and Lord Newtownbutler (later Brinsley Butler, 2nd Earl of Lanesborough), both of whom were then elected Member of Parliament for Cavan County. The losing candidates were George Montgomery (MP) of Ballyconnell and Barry Maxwell, 1st Earl of Farnham. Absence from the poll book either meant a resident did not vote or, more likely, was not a freeholder entitled to vote, which would mean most of the inhabitants of Doon.

The 1790 Cavan Carvaghs list spells the name as Bartunny.

The Tithe Applotment Books for 1834 list two tithepayers in the townland.

Griffith's Valuation of 1857 lists one landholder in the townland.

== Census ==
Year	Population	Males	Females	Total Houses	Uninhabited
1841	7	5	2	1	0
1851	10	6	4	1	0
1861	12	5	7	1	0
1871	12	4	8	2	0
1881	14	5	9	2	0
1891	11	6	5	2	0

In the 1901 census of Ireland, there was one family listed in the townland.

In the 1911 census of Ireland, there was one family listed in the townland.

== Antiquities ==
1. A prehistoric stone cairn called Cloghnacommerky is situate on the border of Moneensauran and Doon townlands. The 'Archaeological Inventory of County Cavan' (Site No. 145) describes it as- Marked on the OS 1836 and 1876 eds. Situated in steep mountainous terrain on the border between the townlands of Doon and Moneensauran. The term 'clogh' in the site name indicates a stone structure. It may represent a prehistoric cairn which was utilised as a marker during the introduction of townland divisions or it may be contemporaneous with this development. Not visited.
2. Stone bridges over the river.
