= Moher (Drumreilly) =

Townland in County Cavan, Ireland

Coordinates: 54.07514°N 7.810271°W

Moher (from Irish Mothar meaning- A Cluster of Trees) is a townland in the civil parish of Drumreilly, barony of Tullyhaw, County Cavan, Ireland.

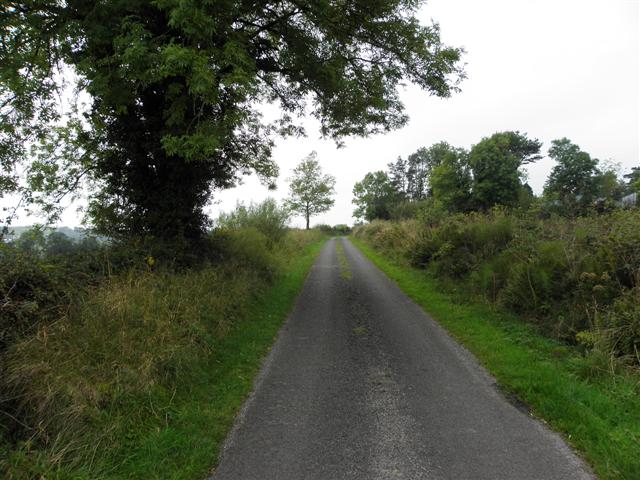
Road at Moher (geograph 3679475)

== Geography ==
Moher is bounded on the south by Ardmoneen townland, on the west by Doon (Drumreilly) townland and on the east by Drumderg, Greaghnaloughry and Lannanerriagh townlands. Its chief geographical features are Bartonny Top mountain (Irish = Bharr an Tonnaigh = The Top of the Mound) which reaches a height of 411 metres, Bartonny Lough, waterfalls, forestry plantations, mountain streams, a sulphurous spa well and dug wells. Moher is traversed by minor public roads and rural lanes. The townland covers 917 statute acres.

== History ==
The landlord of Moher in the 19th century was the Beresford Estate. A map of the Beresford estate drawn in 1831 spells the name as Moher. The Tithe Applotment Books for 1834 list sixteen tithepayers in the townland. Griffith's Valuation of 1857 lists twenty-two landholders in the townland.

The 1913 Ordnance Survey map reduced the area of Moher by taking some of the land adjoining on the south side which had belonged to it in the 1836 OS map and adding it to Ardmoneen townland.

== Census ==
Year	Population	Males	Females	Total Houses	Uninhabited
1841	124	62	62	19	0
1851	88	48	40	17	0
1861	88	46	42	18	0
1871	79	46	33	15	0
1881	81	45	36	15	0
1891	86	43	43	13	0

In the 1901 census of Ireland, there were fourteen families listed in the townland.

In the 1911 census of Ireland, there were fifteen families listed in the townland.

== Antiquities ==
1. Stone bridges over the streams
2. A foot-bridge over the stream.
3. Stepping-stones over the stream
4. A ford over the stream
5. Moher Lodge
6. A lime-kiln
