= Corraleehanbeg =

Townland in County Cavan, Ireland

Coordinates: 54.07514°N 7.810271°W

Corraleehanbeg (from Irish Cor Uí Liathain Beg, meaning- O'Lehan's Small Round Hill) is a townland in the civil parish of Drumreilly, barony of Tullyhaw, County Cavan, Ireland.

== Geography ==
Corraleehanbeg is bounded on the north by Garryfliugh townland, on the south by Kilnamaddyroe townland, on the west by Knockfin and Prabagh townlands and on the east by Clogher, Drumcroman and Drumderg townlands. Its chief geographical features are the hill that the townland is named after which reaches a height of 392 feet, forestry plantations, mountain streams, a lime-kiln and dug wells. It is traversed by minor public roads and rural lanes. The townland covers 155 statute acres.

== History ==
The landlord of the townland in the 19th century was the Beresford Estate.

The Tithe Applotment Books for 1834 spells the name as Coralehanbeg and list six tithepayers in the townland.

Griffith's Valuation of 1857 lists five landholders in the townland.

On 14 June 1880, Philip Meehan, a resident of Coraleehanbeg, was shot dead by Henry Acheson.

== Census ==
Year	Population	Males	Females	Total Houses	Uninhabited
1841	43	23	20	7	0
1851	40	23	17	6	0
1861	42	24	18	7	0
1871	49	31	18	6	0
1881	59	28	31	8	0
1891	35	17	18	7	2

In the 1901 census of Ireland, there were six families listed in the townland.

In the 1911 census of Ireland, there were seven families listed in the townland.

== Antiquities ==
1. A medieval earthen ringfort. The 'Archaeological Inventory of County Cavan' (Dublin: Stationery Office, 1995) states- Raised circular area (int. diam. 30m) enclosed by a much-denuded earthen bank and slight remains of a fosse. Break in bank at NE represents original entrance. Planted with coniferous trees in 1988.
2. Stone bridges over the streams
