= Lannanerriagh =

Townland in Templeport, County Cavan, Ireland

Lannanerriagh (from Irish Lann na nAiríoch, meaning 'The Hut of the Herdsmen') is a townland in the civil parish of Templeport, County Cavan, Ireland. It lies in the Roman Catholic parish of Corlough and barony of Tullyhaw.

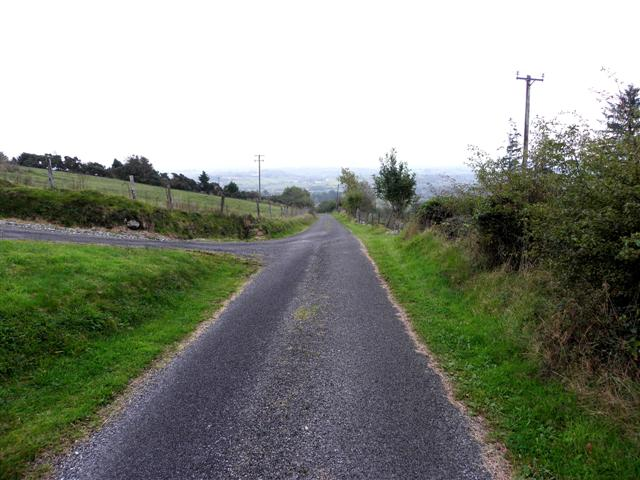
Road at Lannanaria (geograph 3679440)

== Geography ==
Lannanerriagh is bounded on the west by Derrynananta Upper and Doon (Drumreilly) townlands, on the south by Moher (Drumreilly) townland and on the east by Tullyveela and Greaghnaloughry townlands. Its chief geographical features are Benbrack Mountain reaching to an altitude of 1,600 feet above sea-level , forestry plantations, gravel pits, mountain streams, waterfalls, spring wells and dug wells. Lannanerriagh is traversed by minor public roads and rural lanes. The townland covers 708 statute acres. A sub-division in the upper part of the townland is called Crickeen (Cnoc Ín = The Little Hill). A local poet in the 1860s, Dr. Curran, wrote- Crickeen was a freehold in the time of Adam's race/ for the Peelers and Mollies each other to chase.

== History ==
The 1652 Commonwealth Survey depicts the townland as Laneneriagh with the proprietor being Lieutenant-Colonel Tristram Beresford.

A deed by Thomas Enery dated 29 Jan 1735 includes the lands of Lannaneryaugh.

Lowther Kirkwood of Mullinagrave, parish of Templeport, Co. Cavan, gentleman made the following will:

2 July 1804. To his grandnephew Lowther Brien, city of Dublin, attorney, and his heirs his lands of Awengallis, Ballylenan, Ballymagirill, Stranadarragh, Carnagimlie, Cullagh, Drumleden, Leitry [Leitra], Corlagh, Lananleragh [Lannanerriagh], Gowlanlea and Drumlogher, Co. Cavan, held under lease from the Beresford family. He had begun a suit in Chancery, Ireland, against John Brien, late of Salvon, Co. Fermanagh, deceased, for setting aside a fraudulent deed obtained by said John Brien, which suit against the representatives is to be continued by said Lowther Brien, his sole exor. Witnesses: John Johnston and Andrew Rutledge, both of Ballymagiril, and Thos. Stephenson, Drumleaden, Co. Cavan, gent. Memorial witnessed by: said Andrew Rutledge, and John Balfour, city of Dublin, attorney.

A map of the townland drawn in 1813 is in the National Archives of Ireland, Beresford Estate Maps, depicts the townland as Launenarough and the owner as The Lord Primate with the lessee as Mr. Kirkwood.

A lease dated 17 September 1816 John Enery of Bawnboy includes Lonaneryaugh otherwise Loneneriagh.

In the 1825 Registry of Freeholders for County Cavan there was one freeholder registered in Lananariat- Phillip Flanigan. He was a Forty-shilling freeholders holding a lease for lives from his landlord, Henry Breen. The Tithe Applotment Books for 1826 list twenty-one tithepayers in the townland.

The Ordnance Survey Namebooks for 1836 state- This townland pays no county cess nor tithe, being considered a tract of mountain. It is bounded on the north-east by a large stream which rises in the mountain and runs towards the south-east.

The Lannanerriagh Valuation Office Field books are available for September 1839.

In 1841 the population of the townland was 143 being 74 males and 69 females. There were twenty-eight houses in the townland of which all were inhabited.

In 1851 the population of the townland was 127 being 62 males and 65 females, the reduction being due to the Great Famine (Ireland). There were twenty-three houses in the townland and all were inhabited.

Griffith's Valuation of 1857 lists thirty-one landholders in the townland.

In 1861 the population of the townland was 145, being 74 males and 71 females. There were twenty-three houses in the townland and all were inhabited.

In 1871 the population of the townland was 141, being 75 males and 66 females. There were twenty-six houses in the townland and all were inhabited. (page 296 of census)

In 1881 the population of the townland was 139, being 73 males and 66 females. There were twenty-eight houses in the townland, all were inhabited.

In 1891 the population of the townland was 122, being 64 males and 58 females. There were twenty-seven houses in the townland, all were inhabited.

In the 1901 census of Ireland, there are twenty-eight families listed in the townland.

In the 1911 census of Ireland, there are twenty-five families listed in the townland.

== Antiquities ==
1. Foot-bridges over the streams
2. Stepping stones over the streams
3. A lime-kiln
