= Drumreilly =

Parish in Leitrim/Cavan, Ireland

Drumreilly is a civil parish in Ireland, situated partly in the baronies of Carrigallen and Dromahaire, County Leitrim and partly in the barony of Tullyhaw, County Cavan.

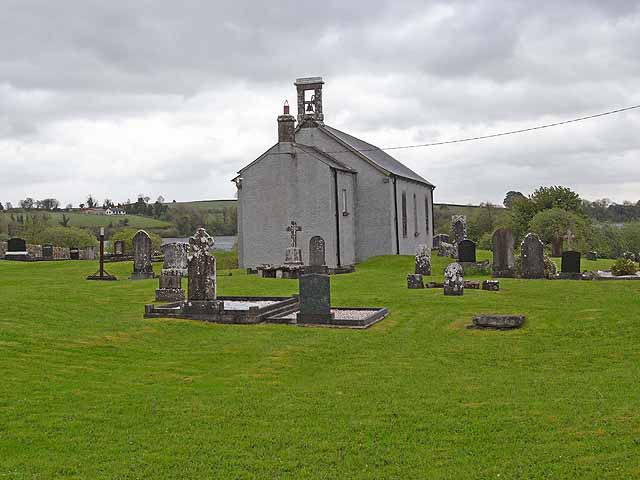
Drumreilly Church of Ireland

== Etymology ==
The name of the parish derives from Drumreilly townland in the parish, which is an Anglicisation of the Gaelic Druim Air Belaigh meaning 'The Hill-Ridge of the Eastern Road'. The earliest surviving reference to the name is c.800 in the Martyrology of Tallaght, where it is spelled Dromma Airbelaig.

== History ==
The parish is in an area originally called Cenel Luacháin inhabited from early times by the Conmhaicne tribe. The reference above in the Martyrology of Tallaght is to a feast day on 15 January referring to the Seven bishops of Dromma Airbelaig, who probably lived in a monastery in the area in early Christian times.

== Townlands ==
The townlands of Drumreilly civil parish in County Leitrim are:

- Achadh
- Aghalough
- Aghawillin
- Aghoo
- Annagh Lower
- Annagh Upper
- Arderry
- Ardunsaghan
- Aughrim
- Boeeshil
- Carntullagh
- Cleighran Beg
- Cleighran More
- Coragh
- Corduff
- Corglass
- Corgloghan
- Cornacreeve
- Cornageeha
- Cornaguillagh
- Cornamucklagh North
- Cornamucklagh South
- Corrala
- Corralahan
- Corraleehan
- Corramahan
- Corrawaleen
- Cortober
- Crockawaddy
- Crockeen
- Cuilmore
- Cuilta
- Cully
- Curraghatawy
- Derradda
- Derreenageer
- Derrinivver
- Derrinwillin
- Derrygoan
- Derrynahona
- Doochorran
- Drumahira
- Drumarigna
- Drumconlevan
- Drumcoura
- Drumcullion
- Drumderg
- Drumdiffer
- Druminalass
- Drumlea
- Drumnafinnila
- Drumnafinnila Barr
- Drumreilly
- Drumristin
- Eden
- Fahy
- Garadice
- Glebe
- Gortachoosh
- Greaghnafarna
- Greaghnaloughry
- Gubs
- Inishmacgrath
- Keelrin
- Keenheen
- Kilgarriff
- Killameen
- Killaphort
- Kilmore
- Kilnacreevy
- Knocks
- Largandill
- Leckan
- Leganamer
- Lisgruddy
- Lislahy
- Lisroughty
- Mullaghboy
- Mullaghmore
- Slievenakilla
- Sradrinagh
- Sradrinan
- Sraloaghan
- Sranadarragh
- Sranagarvanagh
- Stroke
- Toome
- Tullynahaia
- Tullynapurtlin
- Tullyveacan
- Urbal
- Urbal Barr
- Whiterock

The townlands of Drumreilly civil parish in County Cavan are:

- Ardmoneen
- Corraleehanbeg
- Doon (Drumreilly)
- Garryfliugh
- Knockfin
- Moher (Drumreilly)
