= Plague of Mohill =

Plague outbreak in Ireland

In 6th century Ireland, the population of Mohill was devastated by the Justinian plague, an early phenomenon of the Late Antique Little Ice Age c. 536–660 AD. The Mohill plague occurred following the extreme weather events of 535–536 and death of Manchán of Mohill.

== Evidence ==
Evidence for the Justinian plague in Mohill barony is revealed by the names of three contiguous townlands south west of Mohill town—Tamlaght More, Tamlaght Beg, and Tamlaghtavally—all surrounding the former monastery of Mohill. Because Tamlaght (Irish: Taimhleacht) is a pagan name, all three townland names are ancient and pre-Christian in origin. Recognition that the word tamlacht signifies a plague burial site is widespread, but most communities are unaware of their ancient ancestors' experiences. Knowledge of the plague at Mohill emerged after 1975, when a local school teacher named Gaffney, wrote his account:

Tamlaghavally townland: Taibhleacht a' Bhaile or Taibhleacht an Bhealaigh, the plague burial ground of the town or roadway. Taibhleacht is derived from tamh or taimh, an unnatural death as from plague, and leacht signifies a bed of grave, a place where people who died from a plague were buried, generally in a common grave. People who passed the way were accustomed to raise a 'cairn' of stones over the spot by placing single stones over the grave. Tamlaght-Beg and TamlaghMore are of the same origin. Some great plague or pestilence left its name on those three townlands.

Hanley (2002) also identifies Mohill barony with the Justinian plague. He noted nearly all 41 Tamlachta sites in the northern half of Ireland are associated with water - with the exception of Mohill. However, Mohill (Irish: Maothail "soft or spongy place") is connected to waterways — the nearby Lough Rinn feeds the Rinn river, itself a tributary of the Shannon river. Hanley believed the bordering Airgíalla kingdom was uniquely hard hit by pandemic.

Dooley believes another epidemic in A.D. 550, christened the croin Chonaill (redness of C.), or the buidhe Chonaill (yellowness of C.), suggests a fairly widespread outbreak focused on the Shannon area.

== Causes ==
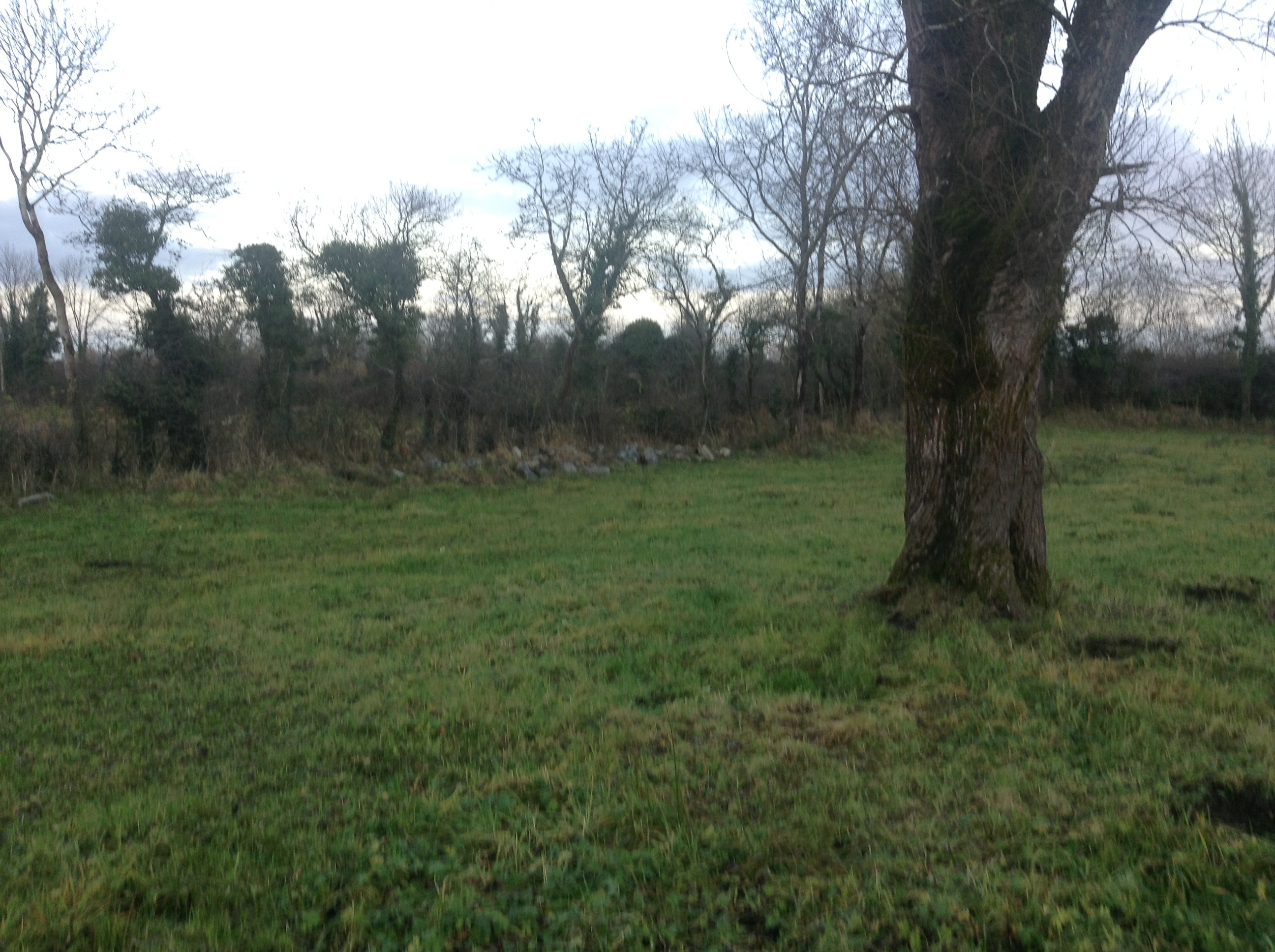
Tamlaghtavally townland, Mohill Parish, County Leitrim

A sudden climate change in the decade after 538 can be observed from dendrochonology studies of Irish trees, and the arrival of the bubonic plague in Ireland c. A.D. 544, seems to correlate with the westward trajectory of the Justinianic plague, which had reached Gaul by A.D. 543. The Four Masters states: "543 AD, an extraordinary universal plague through the world, which swept away the noblest third part of the human race", and the Annals of Ulster christened the pandemic "bléfed". It is estimated 25–50 million, or 40% of European population, died over two centuries as the plague returned periodically up until the 8th century.

== Heritage ==
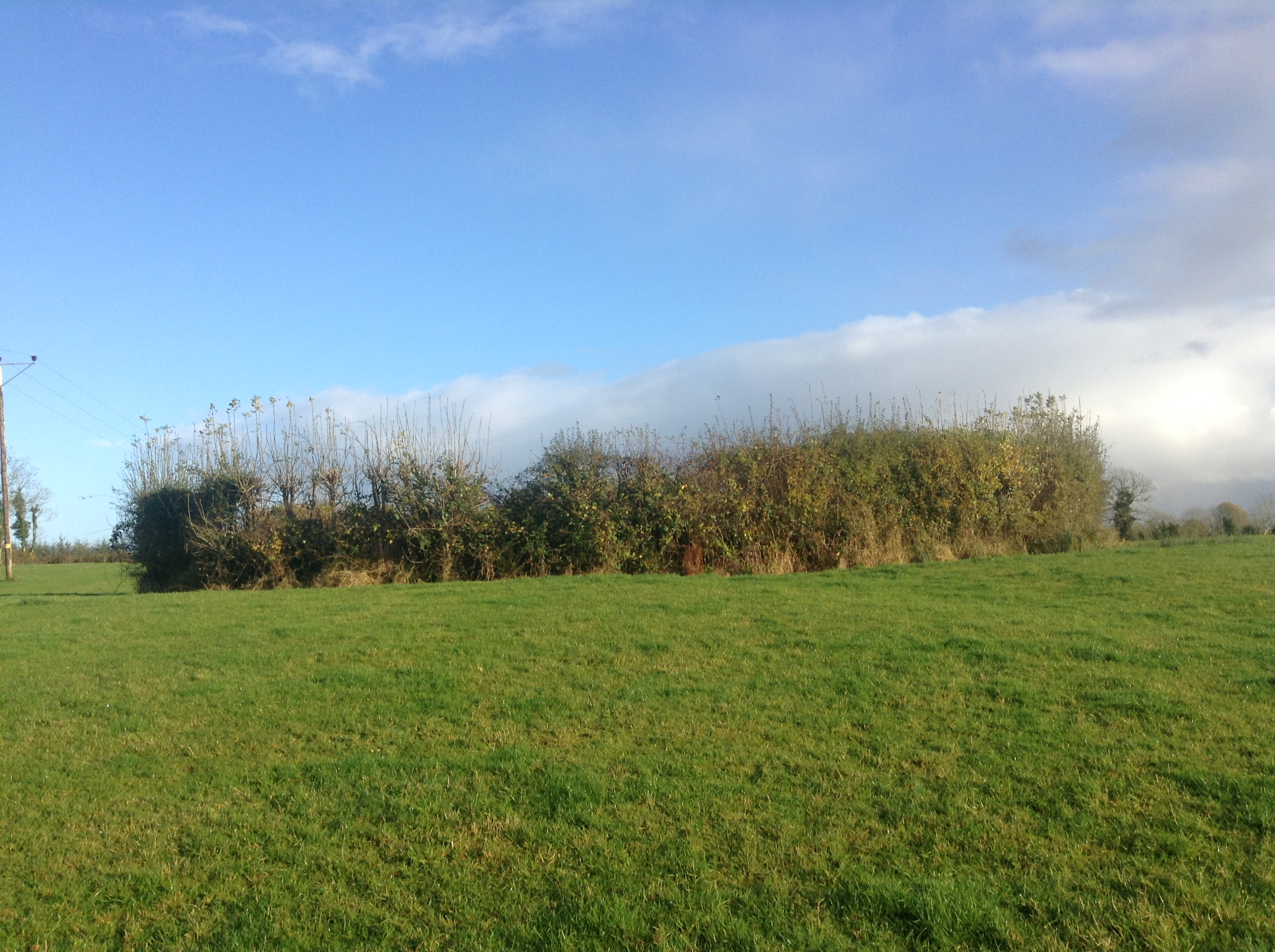
Mullaun (c. 16 m) Ringfort, Drumsna, County Leitrim

Haley observed how

the huge dying off in the 6th century, which is suggested by the number of tamlachta sites, would certainly have created fear if not widespread panic. This was a pandemic in which some people dropped dead in less than one day, some fell ill but recovered, and some remained unaffected. Such seemingly random results might have been interpreted by the populace, even preached by the clerics, as evidence of divine selection.

The presence and death of a Christian missionary during these events at Mohill is recorded. The conversion to Christianity and subsequent veneration of Manchan of Mohill (d. 538) as saint by the local populace is notable. This parish is named "Mohill-Manchan" to this day.

Hanly reported a great surge in ringfort-building after the plague of 545 AD, as the populace on the boundary of devastated regions, Airgíalla and Mohill (barony), sought security from mysterious and widespread death, riving, cattle-raids, enslavement, and worse. These forts (called Raths) were entrenchments the Irish built about their houses. Numerous remains of these forts are visible around ancient barony of Mohill.

== See also ==
- Plague of 664, first recorded English plague
