= Cruimthear Mac Carthaigh =

Cruimthear Mac Carthaigh (the presbyter Mac Carthaigh), fl. c. 550.

In the genealogies, Mac Carthaigh - which is his forename, not his surname - is stated as being a native of Conmaicne Cúile Tolad in what is now along the County Galway - County Mayo border. Thus he was from the same tribal group of Jarlath of Tuam. This branch of the Conmaicne were said to converge, or descend, from Cumhscraidh mac Céacht, who in turn was a descendant of Lugaid mac Con (Modern Irish Lughaidh mac Con). It is unclear which church he was attached to.
