= Maigh Rein =

Barony in County Leitrim, Ireland

Mohill Maothail (Irish)
- Barony
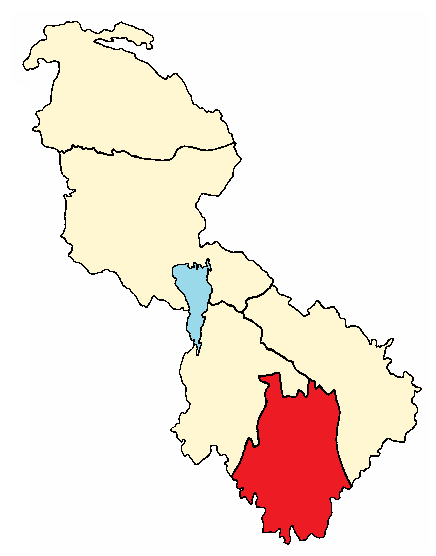
- Country: Ireland
- Province: Connacht
- County: Leitrim

Area
  - Total: 254.56 km^{2} (98.29 sq mi)

The barony of Mohill (Irish: Maothail, historically Conmhaicne Maigh Réin) is an ancient barony in County Leitrim, Ireland.

== Etymology ==
Mohill barony shares its name with Mohill (Irish: Maothail, "soft or spongy ground") village. Historically a variety of corrupted names were used- Irish: Maethail, Maothail, Maothail-Manchan, Maethail-Manachain, Middle English: Moithla, Moethla, Maethla, Maothail, and Latin: Mathail, Nouella.

== Location ==
Mohill is found in south County Leitrim, on the Cloone River, containing Lough Rynn and bordering Lough Boderg. It is bordered to the northeast by Carrigallen; to the northwest by Leitrim (both the preceding baronies are also in County Leitrim); to the southeast by Longford, County Longford; and to the southwest by Ballintober North, County Roscommon.

== History ==
This place was historically named Conmhaicne Maigh Réin. After the 9th century the Reynolds (MacRannall or Muintir Eolais) were chiefs of this territory.

=== Plague ===
Back in the 6th century, the Justinian plague of Mohill devastated the population of Mohill barony and parish.

=== Museum artefacts ===
The following are preserved in a collection at the Royal Irish Academy museum in Dublin.

A medieval sword was found buried 0.6 metres (1 ft 11.6 in) deep in hard clay and gravel in the Black river running through the Clooncumber townland, in Cloone parish, county Leitrim. The long narrow sword blade, of the leaf-shape style, measures 39 centimetres (15.4 in) long by 2.5 centimetres (1.0 in) width, imperfect at both extremities, with four rivet-holes on the hand-plate.

A medieval spear-head was found buried 0.6 metres (1 ft 11.6 in) deep in gravel, between Rinn Lough and Lough Sallagh, near Mohill in county Leitrim. This bolt or arrow head measures 10 centimetres (3.9 in) long, with the length of the socket as long as the blade.

=== Breanross hanging tree ===
Breanross hanging tree, according to tradition recorded by Irish Folklore Commission, is the stump of a hangman's tree, on which Irish rebels of 1798 were executed c. Friday, 7 September 1798, is still pointed out at Breanross townland.

=== Cloonmorris Ogham stone ===
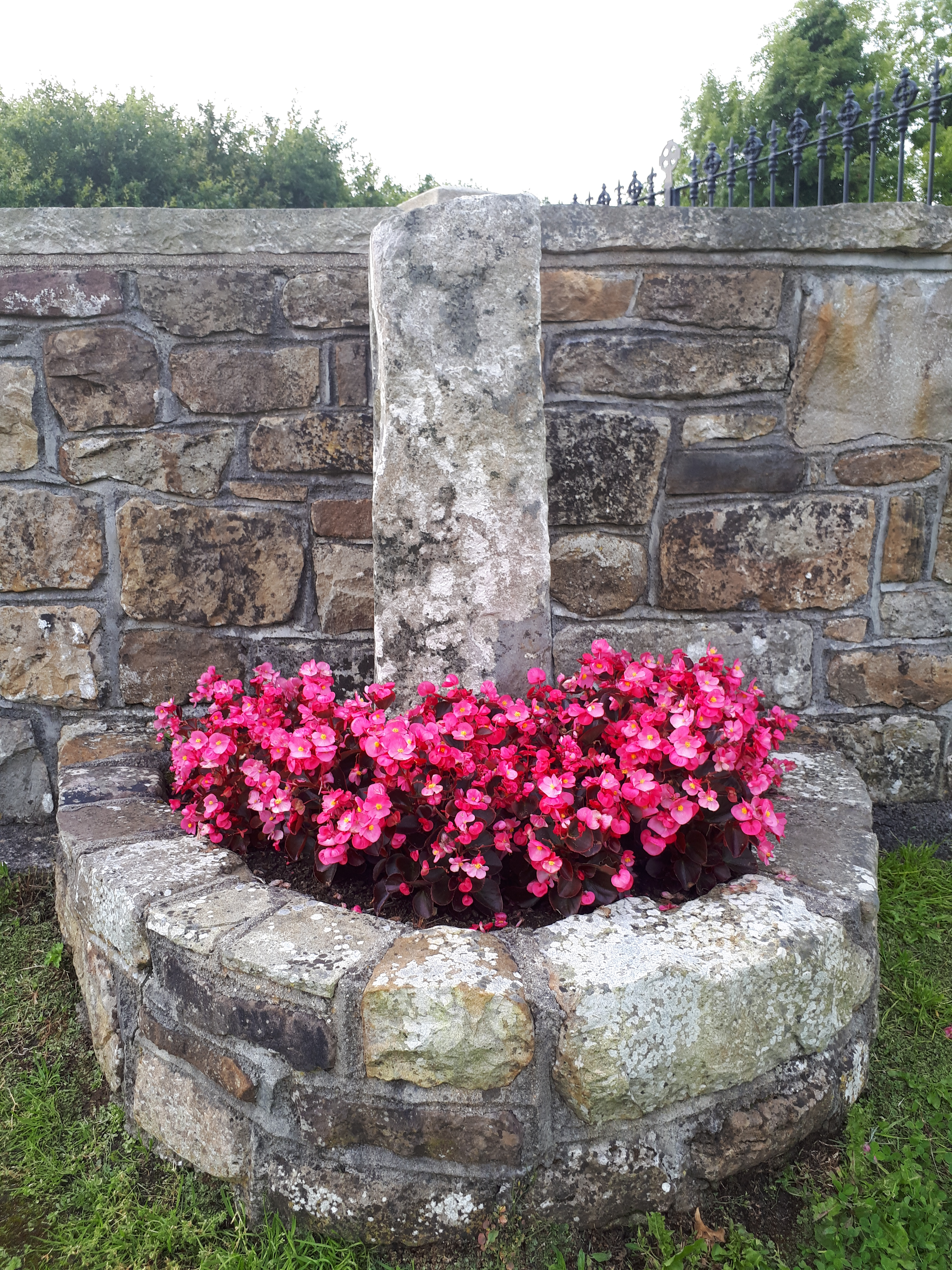
The Cloonmorris Ogham Stone

The Cloonmorris Ogham stone is the only recorded Ogham inscribed stone discovered in county Leitrim.

=== Oldest Irishman ===
Bernard Killain, or Kilrane (1789-1900), aged 111 years may be the oldest recorded Irishman, dying at Tawnymore in Cloone on 29 August 1900. A telegram reporting his death was sent to news outlets from Mohill c. Tuesday 4 September 1900. His father had fought under General Munro in the Irish Rebellion of 1798, and was imprisoned and martyred afterwards. Tom Coughlan compiled his unverified biography. (Note: The telegram from Mohill named Bernard Killain, Griffins Valuation names "Bernard Killbrain" at Cloone in Mohill, but the obituary in the Leitrim Observer on 6 September 1900, names Bernard Kilrane- The death of a centenarian is an incident of rare occurrence whenever it takes place. On Thursday evening last all that was mortal of Mr. Bernard Killrain of Towneymore, who attained the remarkable age of 113 years was laid to rest in the Mohill Churchyard. Deceased was moving about in his usually active manner up to a short time before his death, and his health and mental faculties remained unimpaired almost to the last. His father fought under General Monroe in the County Down in the early part of the Irish Rebellion of 1798. He was made prisoner and executed from the back of a cart and his homestead burned by the British. The children were stolen away to this county by their uncle priest, and arrived in this county while the Battle of Ballinamuck was raging. The old man who has just passed away was of a very discoursive nature and had a clear and vivid recollection of the thrilling period referred to, and many people in recent years found in him a special source of interest as an eye-witness of many dramatic events during and after the period of the Irish Rebellion which he used to relate in his usual kindly Irish style. He was always an industrious and hard-working farmer and a heavy smoker almost to the last.)

== Natural history ==
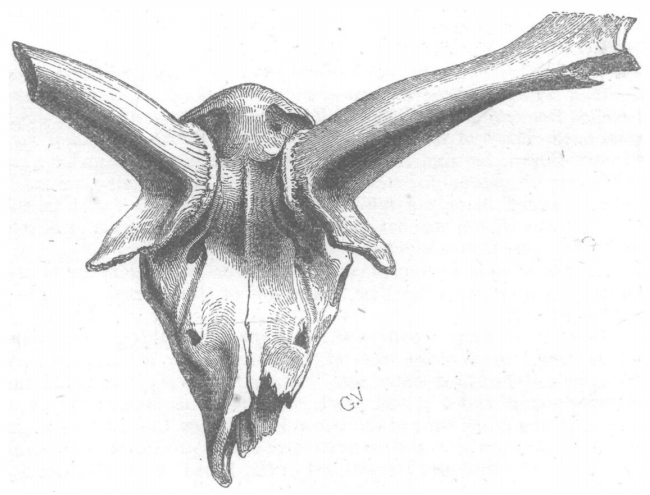
Illustration of a skull of an Irish Elk from Chapelizod in Dublin

=== Irish elk ===
In the 19th Century the skull of an ancient Irish elk was "found in the parish of Cloone, barony of Mohill, county of Leitrim. This head was in the possession of a labourer, who said he found it in the river, under the village of Cloone. A very perfect, large head, measuring, from the occipital crest at top to the end of the mouth bone, 22 inches. The head is rather narrower than usual; a portion of each stem and both brow antlers are perfect. The palm of the brow antler is seven inches across; there is some irre gularity in the crown of the left beam, as if from exuberant growth; a small tit-like projection, apparently the commencement of a third horn, springs from the bone beneath the base of the beam on this side. The colour of the whole is very dark, but both the bone and horn are in a fine state of preservation; it is heavier than any of the other specimens held by the Royal Irish Academy museum in Dublin."

== List of settlements ==
Below is a list of settlements in Mohill barony:

- Cloone
- Mohill
- Dromod
- Roosky

== Notes and references ==
=== Irish annals ===
- Bambury, Pádraig; Beechinor, Stephen (2000). "The Annals of Ulster". CELT: Corpus of Electronic Texts (online ed.). University College Cork. pp. U536.3, U539.1, U545.1.
- O'Donovan, John, ed. (1856). Annála Rioghachta Éireann. Annals of the Kingdom of Ireland by the Four Masters ... with a Translation and Copious Notes. 7 vols. Translated by O'Donovan (2nd ed.). Dublin: Royal Irish Academy. CELT editions. Full scans at Internet Archive: Vol. 1; Vol. 2; Vol. 3; Vol. 4; Vol. 5; Vol. 6; Indices.

=== Primary sources ===
- Walsh, Dennis (2003). "The Baronies of Ireland, L-M". RootsWeb. Ancestry.
- "Mohill, Maothail". Logainm: Placenames Database of Ireland. Department of Arts, Heritage, Regional, Rural and Gaeltacht Affairs. 2008.

=== Secondary sources ===
==== Ecclesiastical ====
- Twemlow, J A (1955). "'Index of Persons and Places: M, N, O', in Calendar of Papal Registers Relating To Great Britain and Ireland". London: British History Online. pp. 1081–1145.
- Archivium hibernicum; or, Irish historical records (PDF). Vol. I. Shannon: Irish University Press, for the Catholic Record Society of Ireland. 1912.
- Ó Cléirigh, Mícheál (1864). O'Donovan, Michael; Reeves, William; Todd, James Henthorn (eds.). The martyrology of Donegal: a calendar of the saints of Ireland (PDF). Dublin: A. Thom, for the Irish Archaeological and Celtic Society.

==== Oldest Irishman ====
- "A Mohill, county Leitrim telegram says". Cardiff Evening Express (special ed.). Walter Alfred Pearce. 5 September 1900.
- "Dead at Last". South Wales Daily Post. Vol. The South Wales Daily Post, 1889-1910 (2, 700 issues). Swansea: William Llewellyn Williams. 4 September 1900.
- "Death at 111". The Western Mail. Vol. 1869-1900 (8, 520 issues). 5 September 1900.
- "Centenarians, A remarkable Irish Record". South Wales Daily News. Vol. 1872-1900 (8, 248 issues). Cardiff: David Duncan & Sons. 5 September 1900.
- "Death of a Centranrian, Mohill, Leitrim, Tuesday". Skibberreen Eagle. Cork. 15 September 1900. (subscription required)
- "Our Irish Letter, Connacht, Leitrim". Catholic Journal. Rochester, New York. 6 October 1900.
- Coughlan, Tom (2016). "Bernard Kilrane".

==== Archaeological ====
- Wilde, W. R. (1857a). "On the Unmanufactured Animal Remains Belonging to the Academy". Proceedings of the Royal Irish Academy. 7 (1857–1861): 181–212. JSTOR 20489862.
- Wilde, W. R. (1857b). A descriptive catalogue of the antiquities … in the Museum of the Royal Irish academy (PDF). Vol. 1, part 2. Dublin: Hodges, Smith & Co.

==== Rebellion ====
- Beiner, Guy (2003). "Mapping the 'Year of the French': The Vernacular Landscape of Folk Memory Landscape of Folk Memory". In Caldicott, C. E. J.; Fuchs, Anne (eds.). Cultural Memory: Eassays on European Literature and History. Peter Lang. pp. 191–208. ISBN 3-03910-053-X.
- Beiner, Guy (2007). Remembering the Year of the French: Irish Folk History and Social Memory (illustrated, reprint ed.). University of Wisconsin Press. ISBN 978-0-299-21824-9.
