= Ballintober North =

Barony (land unit) in County Roscommon, Ireland

Ballintober North Baile an Tobair Thuaidh (Irish)
- Barony
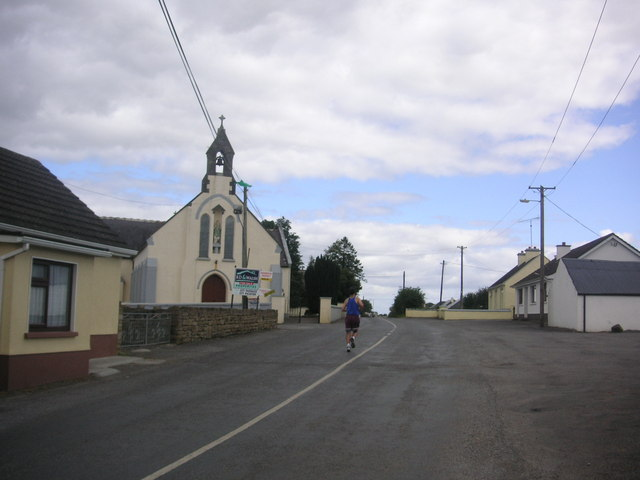
- Church in Whitehall, Ballintober North

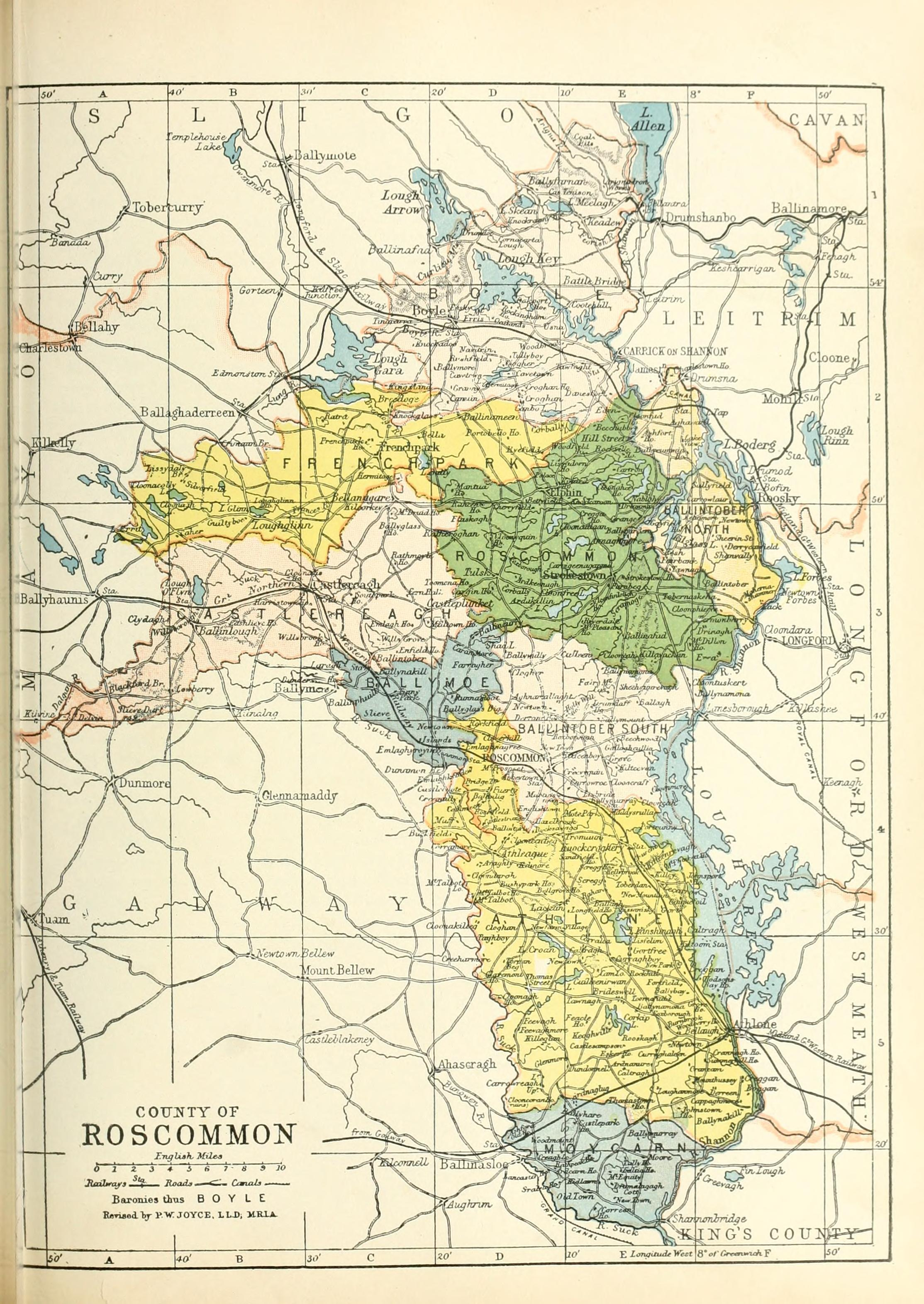
- Barony map of County Roscommon, 1900; Ballintober North is coloured yellow, in the east.
- Sovereign state: Ireland
- Province: Connacht
- County: Roscommon

Area
  - Total: 124.86 km^{2} (48.21 sq mi)

Ballintober North (Irish: Baile an Tobair Thuaidh), also called Ballintober East, is a barony in County Roscommon, Ireland.

== Etymology ==
Ballintober North is named after Ballintober town, which it does not actually contain. That town is located in Castlereagh barony.

== Geography ==
Ballintober North is located in the northeast of County Roscommon, bounded by the River Shannon to the east, an area with many lakes, including Lough Boderg and Kilglass Lough.

== History ==
This area was the ancient kingdom of Baghna, ruled by the Ó Fiannaigh (Feeney) tribe. After them, the Hanleys (Ó hAinle) were the landlords of the area before losing their land in the mid-17th century.

Its northern extreme was the plain of Caradh (modern Carranadoe), referred to in the topographical poem Tuilleadh feasa ar Éirinn óigh (Giolla na Naomh Ó hUidhrín, d. 1420).

It was originally a single barony with Ballintober South; they were separated by 1841.

Wealthy landowning families in the 19th century were the Kings of Charlestown House, the Waldrons, and the Goffs.

== List of settlements ==
Below is a list of settlements in Ballintober North:

- Roosky
- Tarmonbarry
