= Tarmonbarry =

Village in County Roscommon, Ireland

Termonbarry Tearmann Bearaigh
- Village
- Tarmonbarry
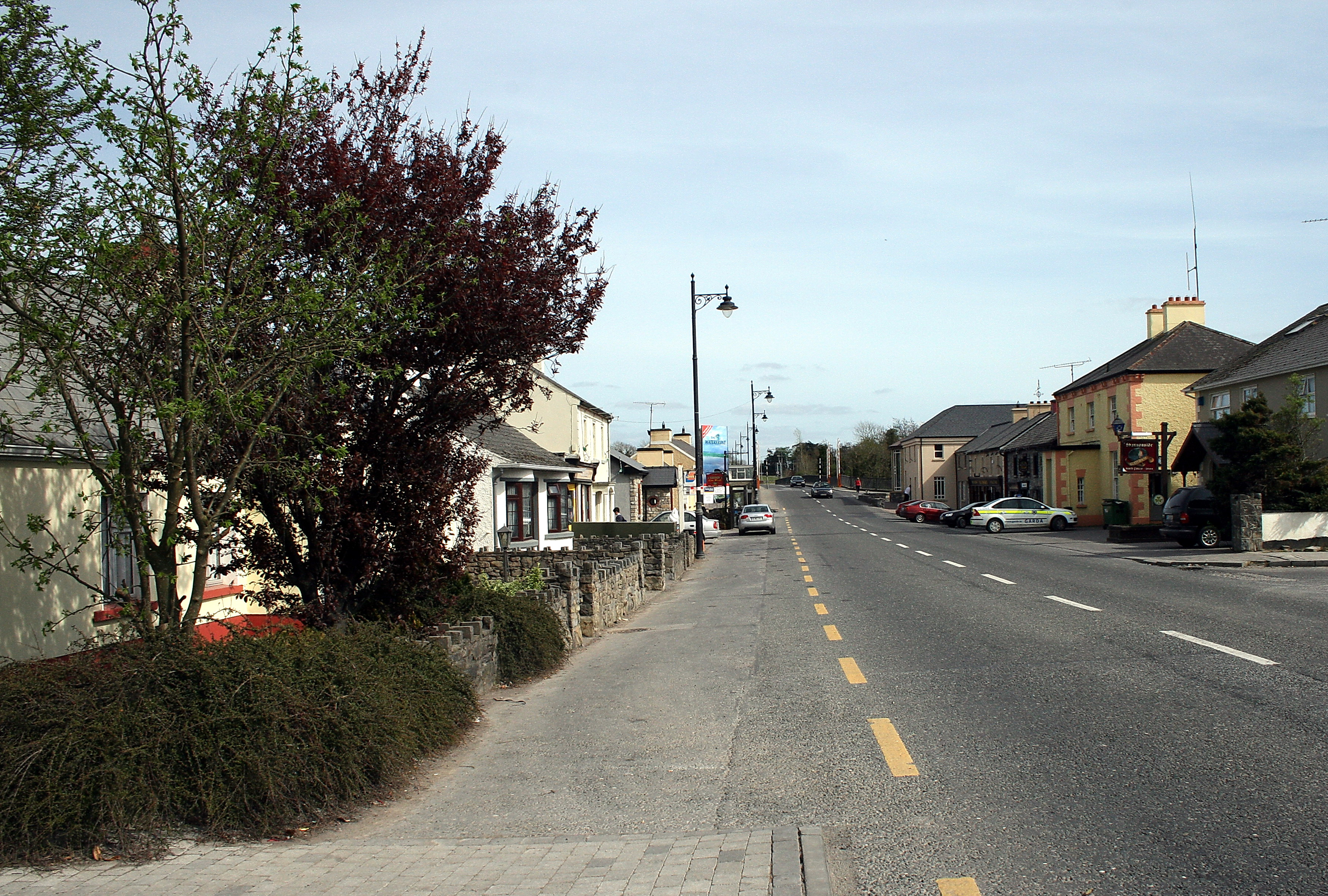
- Termonbarry's main street

- Location in Ireland
- Coordinates: 53°45′N 7°55′W
- Country: Ireland
- Province: Connacht
- County: County Roscommon

Population (2022)
  - Total: 699
- Time zone: UTC+0 (WET)
  - Summer (DST): UTC-1 (IST (WEST))

Tarmonbarry, officially Termonbarry (Irish: Tearmann Bearaigh, meaning 'St Barry's sanctuary'), is a village in County Roscommon, Ireland. 8 km west of Longford town, it is on the River Shannon where it is crossed by the N5 road. East of the bridge, part of the village lies in County Longford. As of the 2022 census, the population of the village 699 people, up from 443 as of the 2016 census. The village is in a civil parish of the same name.

== History and development ==
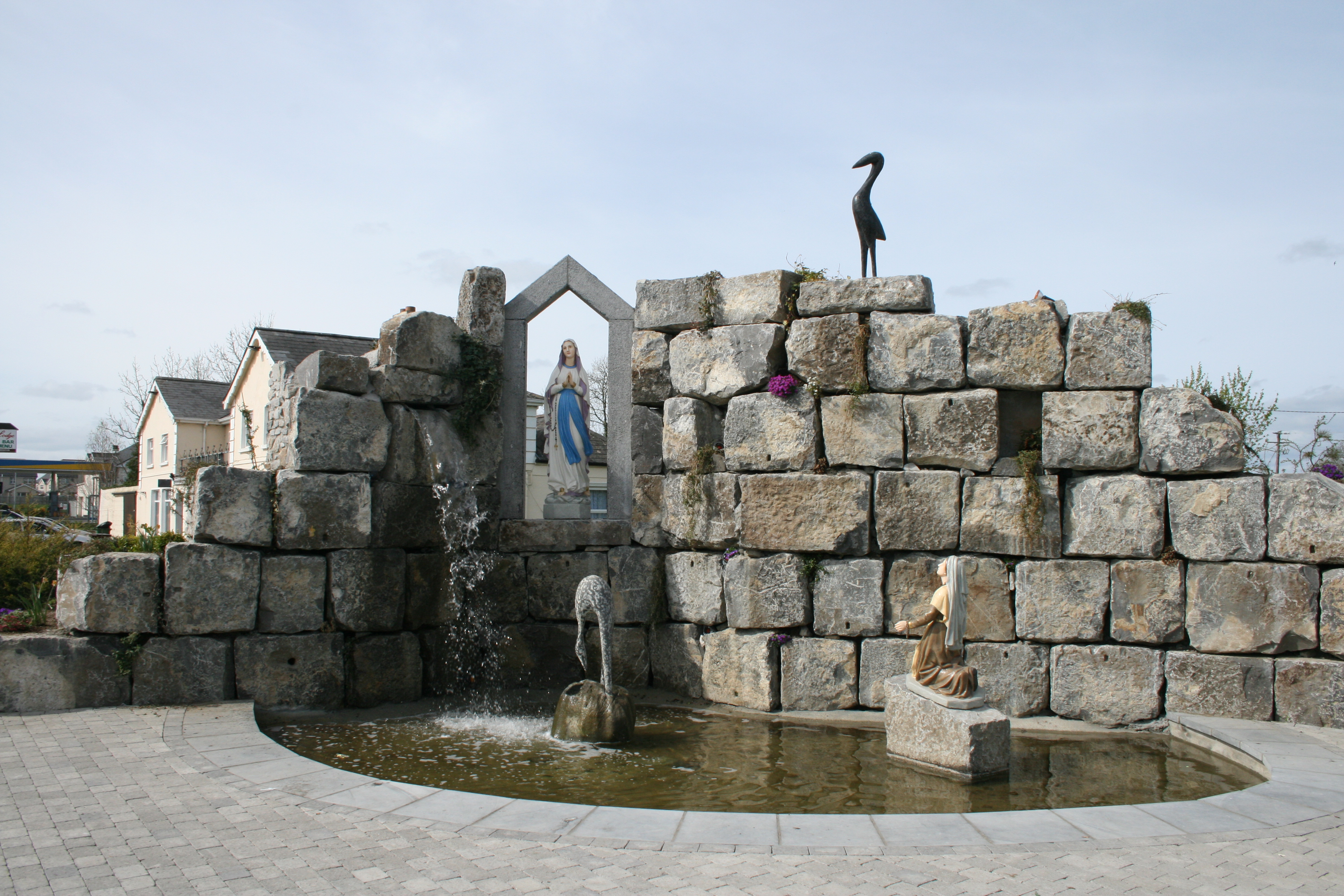
Shrine in Termonbarry on the N5

The village originates from an abbey founded by saint Berach in the 6th century—the name of the village in Irish means roughly "Berach's sanctuary". Berach is the patron saint of Termonbarry.

Termonbarry has a boutique hotel with a restaurant and pub, several bars and restaurants, shops, a petrol station, a marina, a disused Garda station, a GAA pitch, and an art gallery.

== Sport ==
=== Gaelic games ===
St Barrys is the name of the local Gaelic football club, which takes members from Tarmonbarry, Whitehall and the Scramogue region. The club's colours are green and white.

=== Boat racing ===
For a period of about ten years from 1925 to 1935, Tarmonbarry was a centre for hydroplane racing in Ireland, due to the water of the Shannon which was relatively calm. This activity declined due to the high cost of running and maintaining the boats.

== See also ==
- List of towns and villages in the Republic of Ireland
