= Saint Midabaria =

Irish saint

St Midabaria

Nun, Abbess
- Born: c. 500; County Leitrim, Ireland
- Died: County Roscommon, Ireland
- Venerated in: Catholic Church; Strokestown
- Feast: February 22

St Midabaria, Miadhnat or Miodhabhair was a sister of Saint Berach the 6th-century Irish Missionary, she was abbess of a nunnery in Bumlin (Strokestown), County Roscommon in Ireland. She is venerated as Patroness on February 22 each year.

The entry for February 22 in the Lives of the Saints, the name of this saint is phrased as Midabarius Rinn Drochidii which makes her appear male however, she was also called Midabaria. She is referenced in several books of the saints around Europe. She was recognised in particular for her healing.

Midabaria was born in the townland of Gortnalougher just outside Cloone, County Leitrim.

She was the daughter of Nemnald (Neamnann, Neamhann, Neamhall) and Finmaith (Fionnmaith, Fionmhaith). Her mother was also sister to Freoch of Cloon (d. ~ 570). Her father's family were from clan Cinel Dobtha. It was not particularly powerful side branch of Clan Uí Briuin. She referred to the Irish canon, hagiographer and historian John O'Hanlon (1821-1905) in his Lives of the Irish Saints which was taken from the extant martyrologies.

== See also ==
- Acta sanctorum: Februarius, Volume 4
- Life of Berach Page 25
