= Books of Survey and Distribution =

Books of Survey and Distribution were compiled around 1680 as the result of the wars of the mid-seventeenth century after the Cromwellian conquest of Ireland, when the English government needed reliable information on land ownership throughout Ireland to carry out its policy of land confiscation.

== Purpose ==
The books were used to impose the acreable rent called the Quit Rent, which was payable yearly on lands granted under terms of the Acts of Settlement and Explanation. It is possible to discover to whom, if anyone, the confiscated lands were granted so that we have a record of landowners for 1641 and 1680. As a result, it is possible to determine the amount of lands lost by the 1641 owners after the Irish Rebellion of 1641 and to discover the names of the new proprietors.

== Contents ==
The Books of Survey and Distribution form part of the Annesley Papers (ref D.1854). They consist of 22 volumes and each volume includes an 'alphabet' which is an index of denominations. The text includes a physical description of each barony, with details of woods, bogs, rivers, soil, etc. The information is laid out in tabular form on a barony and parish basis. The details include: "Proprietors in 1641 by the Civil Survey", "Denominations of lands by the Downe Survey", "Number of acres distributed", "persons to whom distributed" and "Rent per annum payable to His Majesty".

== Surviving volumes ==
The surviving Survey and Distribution volumes cover the following counties: Kilkenny, Waterford, Kerry, Kildare, Carlow, Wexford, Longford, Mayo, Tipperary, Monaghan, Armagh, Limerick, Westmeath, Clare, Roscommon, Galway, Cork, Down, Antrim, Leitrim, Sligo, Cavan, Fermanagh, Laois, Offaly, Wicklow, Donegal, Londonderry and Tyrone.

== Publications and online versions ==
The Books for Clare, Galway, Mayo and Roscommon have been published by the Irish Manuscripts Commission. For other counties, manuscript copies are available at the National Library. Those for co Clare were published in the nineteenth century as part of James Frost's The History and Topography of the County of Clare. A digital version has been put online by Clare County Library.

In 2022 the manuscripts were digitized and published online as part of the "Virtual Treasury" project.
