= Battle of Magh Slecht =

Irish battle over kingdom control in 1256

Coordinates: 54°10′N 7°49′W

Battle of Magh Slècht
Date	1256
Location	near Magh Slècht, County Cavan
Result	Decisive O'Rourke-O'Connor victory

Belligerents
Kingdom of West Breifne; Kingdom of Connacht	Kingdom of East Breifne; House of Burke

Commanders and leaders
Conchobhair Ua Ruairc; Áed mac Feidhlimid Ua Conchobhair; Feidlim Ua Conchobair	Cathal Ua Raghallaigh †; Cúchonnacht Ua Raghallaigh †; Walter de Burgh

The Battle of Magh Slécht took place at Magh Slécht in Ireland in 1256. The battle was part of a wider conflict between the O'Rourke rulers of Breifne and their traditional O'Reilly vassals over control of the kingdom. Both sides were assisted by their respective allies, the O'Connor kings of Connacht and their Burke opponents. The battle marks the site at which the Kingdom of Breifne was left permanently divided, creating West Breifne (O'Rourke) and East Breifne (O'Reilly).

== Prelude ==
Ally of the O'Reillys, Walter de Burgh, raided deep into Connacht and devastated the O'Connors. According to the Annals of Connacht, de Burgh had an army of 20,000 men, but this is most definitely exaggerated. This was followed by an O'Reilly attack in western Breifne (modern County Leitrim), the home territory of the O'Rourkes. The two armies were meant to rendezvous at Lough Allen but the O'Reillys came under heavy attack in the townland of Seltanahunshin, County Leitrim and retreated northwards. They were pursued by Aedh O'Connor and his cavalry to the townlands of Bellavally Upper and Legnaderk in Magh Slecht, County Cavan, where the battle ensued (Road R200).

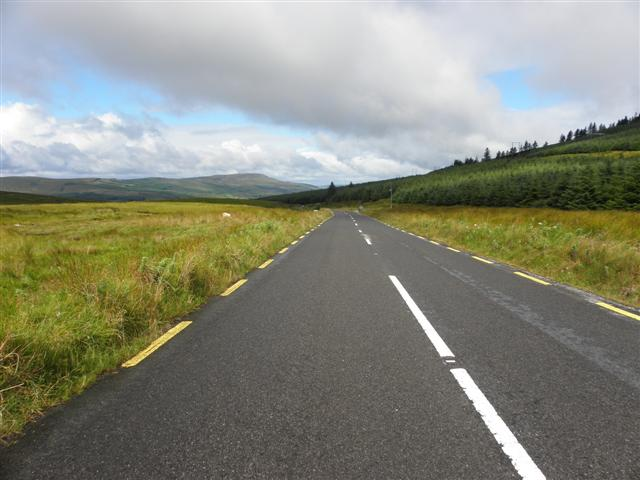
Bel in Belaig, Magh Slécht (2013)

== Outcome ==
The main combatants in the battle, the O'Reillys and the O'Rourkes, suffered heavy losses. The O'Reillys in particular lost their king, their top military commander, and many of their nobility. The clan had usurped control of Breifne from the O'Rourkes for a time from the 1230s until the early 1250s, but their crushing defeat at Magh Slecht ended any hopes they had of controlling the entire kingdom again.

De Burgh and the O'Reilly were successfully repelled, but his bold excursion into Connacht alarmed the Gaels. Following the battle, the kings of Connacht, Tír Chonaill and Tír Eoghain met at Caoluisce Castle to agree to form a united front against the Normans in the future. At these talks, which the O'Rourke lords of Breifne were excluded from, it was agreed that the king of Connacht was the rightful ruler of all of Breifne "from Kells to Drumcliff". This claim put Aedh O'Connor in direct confrontation with Connor O'Rourke, king of West Breifne, who rebelled against him, sparking a Breifne-Connacht War.

== Annalistic Accounts ==
=== Annals of Connacht ===
1256.5
"A huge army was raised by Walter son of Richard Burke to attack Fedlim mac Cathail Chrobdeirg and Aed his son and Conchobar son of Tigernan O Ruairc, an army which for might and multitude had never been surpassed in Ireland, for it numbered twenty thousand to a man. They came to Mayo and Balla and passed through Leyney, which they plundered on all sides, to Achonry; and from there they sent messengers to the Ui Raigillig, bidding them to come and meet them at Cros Dairi Cain at the eastern end of the Brauslieve mountains in Tir Thuathail. The Ui Raigillig came to Clachan Mucada on Slieve Anierin, but turned back from there, not having effected a meeting with the Galls, and came to Soltin Gasain. And on that same day—a Friday, and the feast of Crosses in fact—Conchobar son of Tigernan O Ruairc mustered the men of Brefne and Conmaicne and all whom he could get, including Aed son of Fedlim O Conchobair and the chiefs of the Sil Murray and the rest of the men of Connacht. Now these are the best men that were with him:—Conchobair son of Tigernan O Ruairc king of Brefne, Cathal O Flaithbertaig, Murchad Finn O Fergail, Ruad in Feda O Flainn, Flann Mag Oirechtaig and Donn Oc, O Cellaig, the three sons of Mac Diarmata, Diarmait O Flannacain, Cathal son of Duarcan O hEgra, the two sons of Tigernan O Conchobair and Gilla na Naem O Taidc. But there were many of the youth of Connacht there besides these. The van of this host came upon the Ui Raigillig at Sailten Gassan and pursued them to Alt Tige Meg Currin. Here the new levies of the Muinter Raigillig turned upon this joint force and broke them thrice. The main army came up with them after [some of] their men had been killed: Diarmait O Flannacain, Mac Maenaig, Coiclid O Coiclid and a number of others; and the combined armies came to Alt na hElti and Doirin Cranncha, between Ath na Betige and Bel in Belaig and Coill Esa and Coill Airthir, on Slieve Anierin. And here the Muinter Raigillig turned hardily, eagerly, wildly, strenuously, irrepressibly, to attack Fedlim's son and to avenge their injuries and oppression on him, and each chieftain exhorted his followers to go against the Connacht army."

1256.6
"Then rose up the Connachtmen on the other side of the battle, and a comely, quick, hot and hasty company were they. They ranged themselves in a burning, blazing, active, fiery throng, a phalanx stout and stable, round Aed mac Fedlim, that strong sturdy prince, and on that day the high-king's son showed a ruler's fury, a champion's endurance, a lion's prowess. A fierce furious felling fight was joined then between the two hosts, many were killed and wounded on either side: Conchobar son of Tigernan [O Ruairc] king of Brefne, Murchad Finn O Fergail, Maelruanaid Mac Donnchada and many others were wounded on that field and some of them, among whom was Murchad O Fergail, died of their wounds at home; while Flann Mag Oirechtaig was killed in the recoil of the battle, and many more with him. However, those who have knowledge of this great battle relate that the warriors of the host on that field could not look in the face of the high lord, for two great wide-glancing torches were flaming and flashing in his head, so that all feared to speak with him; for he was within hailing-distance in front of the armies as they approached the forces of the Ui Briuin; and he uttered his high-king's war-cry and his champion's shout in the midst of the fight and never stopped on that charge and onset until the ranks of the Ui Briuin were scattered."

1256.7
"But there were killed there Cathal O Raigillig, king of Muinter Mailmorda and Cath Aeda Finn, Domnall Ruad and Niall his sons, and Cu Chonnacht his brother; the three sons of Cathal Dub O Ruairc, Gofraid, Fergal and Domnall; Annad son of Domnall O Raigillig, killed by Conchobar son of Tigernan O Ruairc; Niall, that is in Caech O Raigillig; Tigernan Mag Brataig and Gilla Micheil son of Taichlech and Donnchad O Bibsaig; Magnus Mac Gilla Duib, and more than three score of their chief men besides. Sixteen of the Ui Raigillig themselves were also killed there. The Battle of Mag Slecht at the brink of Ath Derg, at Allt na hElti above Belach na Bethige—that is the name of this battle."

1256.8
"After this battle, Fedlim O Conchobair and his son Aed na nGall, with the men of Connacht, and Tigernan O Ruairc, with the men of Brefne, made an expedition to Loch in Trein; and the two armies fell upon the churches of Brefne, all except Fenagh, and returned(?) to their homes with hostages of the Fir Brefne, that is, of Mac Fiachrach and Mac Tigernain and Mag Samradain and of the son of Art O Ruairc; and Fedlim gave the hostages of the chieftains into the custody of O Ruairc and handed over Mag Samradain to his own son, Aed na nGall"

== Archaeology ==
Dead bodies from the battle are sometimes discovered buried in the surrounding townlands.

== See also ==
- History of Ireland
- Irish battles
