= Carrigallen (barony) =

Barony in County Leitrim, Ireland

Carrigallen Carraig Álainn (Irish)
- Barony
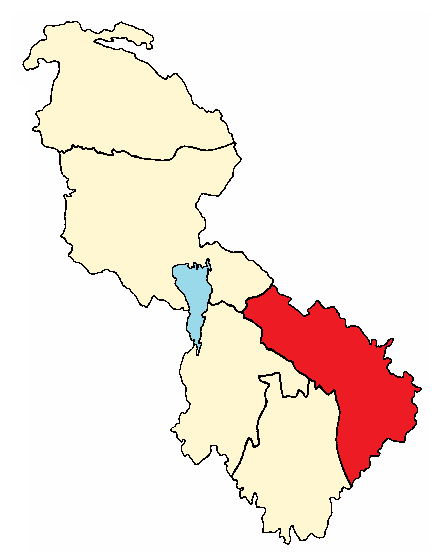
- Country: Ireland
- Province: Connacht
- County: Leitrim

Area
  - Total: 252.5 km^{2} (97.5 sq mi)

Carrigallen (Irish: Carraig Álainn) is a barony in County Leitrim, Ireland.

== Etymology ==
Carrigallen barony takes its name from the village of Carrigallen (Irish: Carraig Álainn, "beautiful stone").

== Location ==
Carrigallen is found in southeast County Leitrim, stretching from Bencroy to Garadice Lough to Gulladoo Lough.

Carrigallen barony is bordered to the west by Drumahaire and Leitrim; to the south by Mohill (all the preceding baronies are also in County Leitrim); to the north by Tullyhaw, County Cavan; to the east by Tullyhunco, County Cavan; to the southeast by Longford and Granard, County Longford.

== History ==
The Mag Dorchaidh (Darcy) were chiefs of Cenél-Luachain in the modern parish of Oughteragh. The MacRannall chiefs held much of this barony as part of the territory called Conmaicne Mag Rein. During at least the 19th and 20th centuries, three annual fairs were held at Longfield townland on – 16 May, 10 October, and 27 December, while four annual fairs were held at Carrigallen on- 7 May, 9 August, 8 October, and 31 December.

=== Museum artefacts ===
There are a number of medieval artifacts from Carrigallen barony preserved in a collection at the Royal Irish Academy museum in Dublin. A small medieval brooch-pin with highly decorated penannular rings was found on the bed of the Yellow river near the Ballyduff Bridge near Ballinamore, Oughteragh parish in county Leitrim, and a bronze medieval sword blade was found in the crevice of a rock on the same river, the blade being perfect, with a broad leaf pattern, bevel edge, handle-piece welded, six rivet-holes on the handle (two not through), with hilt notches, measures 0.46 metres (1 ft 6.1 in) long by 3.2 centimetres (1.3 in) width. A Celt was found in the bed of the river at Ballyheedy bridge, at Ardrum downland near Ballinamore in county Leitrim, a good long narrow specimen, of bright yellow bronze, triangular shaped, flat-surfaced, and roughly decorated with a hammered fan-tailed ornament radiating towards the blade.

== List of settlements ==
Below is a list of settlements in Carrigallen barony:

- Ballinamore
- Carrigallen
