= Conmaicne =

People of early Ireland

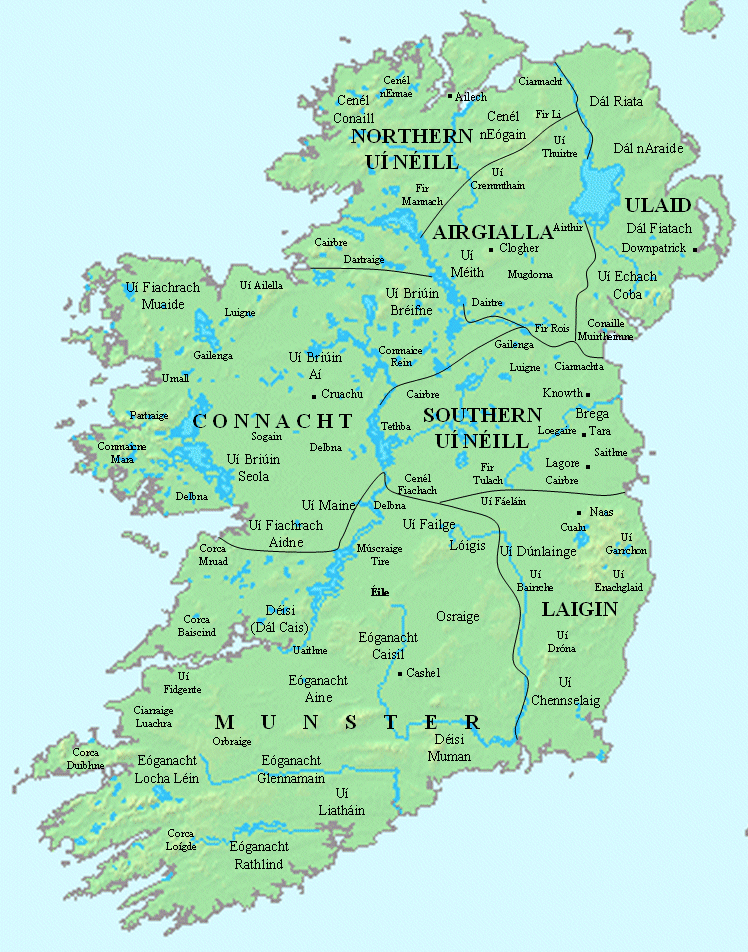
Early peoples and kingdoms of Ireland, c.800

The Conmaicne (Old Irish pronunciation: [ˈkɔnˠˌβ̃ɑkʲːnʲɛ]; Modern Irish: Conmhaicne) were a people of early Ireland, perhaps related to the Laigin, who dispersed to various parts of Ireland. They settled in Connacht and Longford, giving their name to several Conmaicne territories. T. F. O'Rahilly's assertion the Conmaicne were non-Goidelic is not widely accepted.

== Etymology ==
Their name originates from a mythical ancestor known as Conmac(c) (Old Irish: [ˈkɔnˠˌβ̃ɑkː]), meaning "hound-son" (con, prefix form of n-stem cú hound; mac, son). Conmac(c) descended from Fergus mac Róich and Queen Medb of Connacht. However, Walsh stated "Conmac son of Fergus is a genealogical fiction". The word Conmaicne means "progeny of Conmac" (-ne, a progeny). The name in Old Irish spelling contains m (without a following h) and c (or more etymologically, cc), thus Old Irish Conmac(c) and Conmaic(c)ne, but in Modern Irish spelling contains mh (with unetymological h as a sign of lenition) and single c, thus Conmhac and Conmhaicne).

== Branches ==
The Conmaicne split into several branches that dispersed to various places.

- Conmaicne Cenéoil Dubáin of Dunmore, County Galway.
- Conmaicne Cúile (Conmhaicne Cúile) of Kilmaine, County Mayo.
- Conmaicne Mara (lit. 'Conmaicne of the Sea'; Conmhaicne Mara) settled in the west of County Galway and became Connemara.
- Conmaicne Réin (Conmhaicne Réin), Conmaicne Maige Réin (Conmhaicne Maighe Réin) or the "lower Conmaicne" of Magh Réin, now Fenagh, County Leitrim.
  - Cenel Luacháin (Cinéal Luacháin) who ruled what is now two parishes, Oughteragh and Drumreilly, in Carrigallen, County Leitrim.
  - Muinter Eolais
    - Muinter Cerballáin (Muintir Chearbhalláin)
    - Cluain Conmaicne (Cluain Conmhaicne) a settlement in modern day Cloone, County Leitrim.
- Muinter Angaile (Muintir Anghaile), or "upper Conmaicne", of Annaly, county Longford.

The Diocese of Ardagh was established in 1111 as the see for east Connacht. Fourteen years later, at the Synod of Kells-Mellifont, its area was reduced to the territory of the Conmaicne Réin and Muinter Angaile, south county Leitrim and all county Longford. The diocese was commonly called "the Diocese of the Conmaicne".

== People ==
John O'Donovan wrote:

The chief families of the Conmacians were the O'Fearralls, princes and lords of Annaly, or Longford; the Mac Rannalls, a name anglicised to Reynolds, who were Lords of Conmaincee of Moy-Rein and Muintir-Eolais, in Leitrim; the Mac Keoghes, who were chiefs in Galway, and also in Lenister; the MacShanleys; O'Rodaghans; MacDorchys; O'Mulveys; O'Morans, and O'Mannings, chiefs and clans in various parts of Longford, Leitrim, and Roscommon.

Notables descended from the Conmhaicne include Cruimthear Mac Carthaigh, St. Jarlath of Tuam and some abbots of Clonmacnoise.

== See also ==
- Delbhna
- Cíarraige
- Pre-Norman invasion Irish Celtic kinship groups, from whom many of the modern Irish surnames came from
