= Kilsob =

Townland in the civil parish of Templeport, County Cavan, Ireland

Coordinates: 54.07514°N 7.810271°W

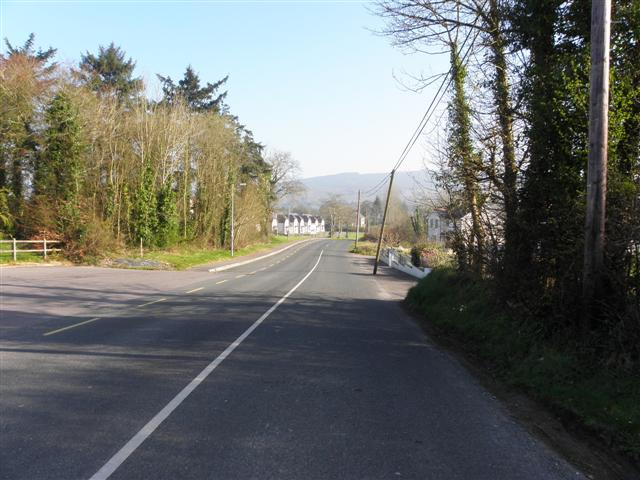
Road at Kilsob townland, Templeport, County Cavan, Ireland, heading NNE to Bawnboy

Kilsob (from Irish Coill Subh meaning "Wood of the Berries") is a townland in the civil parish of Templeport, County Cavan, Ireland. It lies in the Roman Catholic parish of Templeport and barony of Tullyhaw.

== Geography ==
Kilsob is bounded on the north by Erraran and Bawnboy townlands, on the west by Newtown, Lakefield and Mullaghmore, Templeport townlands, on the south by Kildoagh townland and on the east by Muinaghan and Corrasmongan townlands. The town of Bawnboy is partly situate in the north part of the townland and was sometimes referred to as Kilsob in the past, rather than Bawnboy. Its chief geographical features are Bellaboy Lough (Irish = Loch Béal Átha Buí = The Lake of the Entrance to the Yellow Ford), the Bawnboy River, a stone quarry and dug wells. Kilsob is traversed by the national secondary N87 road (Ireland), the L1037 road, minor roads and rural lanes. The townland covers 348 statute acres.

== History ==
In medieval times the McGovern barony of Tullyhaw was divided into economic taxation areas called ballibetoes, from the Irish Baile Biataigh (Anglicized as 'Ballybetagh'), meaning 'A Provisioner's Town or Settlement'. The original purpose was to enable the farmer, who controlled the baile, to provide hospitality for those who needed it, such as poor people and travellers. The ballybetagh was further divided into townlands farmed by individual families who paid a tribute or tax to the head of the ballybetagh, who in turn paid a similar tribute to the clan chief. The steward of the ballybetagh would have been the secular equivalent of the erenagh in charge of church lands. There were seven ballibetoes in the parish of Templeport. Kilsob was located in the ballybetagh of "Balleagheboynagh" (alias 'Ballyoghnemoynagh'). The original Irish is Baile Na Muighe Eanach, meaning 'The Town of the Marshy Plain'). The ballybetagh was also called "Aghawenagh", the original Irish is Achadh an Bhuí Eanaigh, meaning 'The Field of the Yellow Bog').

A subdivision of the townland is named Rossilk or Ruserk.

The 1609 Ulster Plantation Baronial Map depicts the townland as Kilsobb.

In the Plantation of Ulster by grant dated 26 June 1615, King James VI and I granted, inter alia, four polls in Killsobb to Sir George Graeme and Sir Richard Graeme to form part of the Manor of Greame. An Inquisition held at Cavan Town on 31 October 1627 found that Sir Richard Greames of Corrasmongan died on 7 November 1625 seized of, inter alia, four polls in Kilsob. His son and heir Thomas Greames was aged 40 (born 1585) and married. After the Cromwellian Act for the Settlement of Ireland 1652 the Graham family were still in possession of Kilsob.

In the Hearth Money Rolls compiled on 29 September 1663 there was one person paying the Hearth Tax in- Kilsobb- Mr. John Brench.

By a deed dated 7 January 1746 between- Veaitch Betty of Kilsob in the County of Cavan, Gentleman of the one part and Bryan Reilly & Patrick McKiernan of Middle Kilsob of the other part, the said Veaitch Betty leased land for 21 years to said Bryan Reilly & Patrick McKiernan in Middle Killsob. Witnesses: Terence Kiernan of the City of Dublin & John Beatty of Swadlingbar & George Booth near Drumersnaw, Co. Leitrim.

The aforesaid Reverend Veaitch Betty of Lakefield, Templeport by his will dated 16 July 1783 (Born 1709. Died August 1785. Probate granted July 1796) stated- To be buried in the vault I made at Temple Piert. To my dear wife Mary Betty the houses and demesne of Lakefield with the mill race and ten acres whereon the mill is built provided she keeps unmarried, and after her demise to my eldest son Rowland Betty. To my daughters, Susanna Betty and Ann Betty, £300 each to be paid out of the lands of Kilsob. To my second son William Betty the farm of land known as Middle Kilsob or Gortenane, and his heirs. To my eldest son Rowland Betty the lands of Newtown known by the name of Tony McCallan, the farm of Lower Kilsob and the farm of Mullaghmore, the above lands not to be taken over until my debts and the children's fortunes are paid. Should either son die without male heirs then to the elder surviving daughter of either. To my said son William Beatty the lease of Gortnacarrig, County Cavan, made to me by the Right Honourable Lord Farnham and the lease of Lavaghmore, Co. Leitrim, made to me by Samuel Campbell, Esq. To my granddaughter Isabella Simpson twenty pounds to be paid by her uncle William Betty when she marries or comes of age. Ten shillings each to the poorest widows or orphans of Templepiert and Drumreilly. A debt of nearly £100 is owed to me by Rev. Mr. Swanne. Exors. my wife Mary Betty and my sons Rowland and William. Witnesses: Thomas Farrelly, Hugh Bannan, John Logan. Codicil 27 Sept. 1784. The bequest to my wife also includes the peninsula of Rus and Francis McTaggart's houses to enable her to support my daughters to whom I bequeath an additional £200 each. To my son William that part of Mullaghmore formerly in the possession of Andrew Brady and now in possession of Farrell Logan, the farm near Bawnboybridge now in the possession of Arthur and William Ennis, those parts of Gortnacarrigg and Lavagh Middle and Kilsob now in the possession of the Gilronans and Ml. [? Ward], Thomas Farrelly and Flin and that part called Ruserk in the possession of Laurence Bannan (subject to a rent of Col. Wynne), and his heirs, and in default to said Rowland Betty and his heirs male, etc. and in default to my own right heirs. Witnesses: Thomas Farrelly, Hugh Bannan, Michael Logan. Memorial witnessed by: John Farrelly and Hugh Bannan.

William Betty (seal) sworn at Cavan 12 July 1796

== Census ==
Year	Population	Males	Females	Total Houses	Uninhabited
1841	194	100	94	32	0
1851	173	83	90	30	3
1861	157	77	80	31	1
1871	156	82	74	28	0
1881	133	68	65	26	4
1891	139	70	69	24	2

In the 1901 census of Ireland, there are thirty nine families listed in the townland, and in the 1911 census of Ireland, there are forty four families listed in the townland.

== Antiquities ==
The chief structures of historical interest in the townland are

1. St Mogue's Roman Catholic Church
2. Airmount House. The book Bawnboy and Templeport History Heritage Folklore by Chris Maguire states- On the Lakefield road is Airmount House, Kilsob, built about 1800 by the local landlord William Betty, and leased to his steward Alexander Hill, who later sold it to John W. Bennison. It was bought by Thomas Phillips of Belturbet about 1860 and passed on to John Phillips, who with Thomas Magauran were delegates for Bawnboy Gallowglasses at the 1888 G.A.A. Convention, Cavan. John Phillips married Margaret McManus, their children being Mary Cathleen, Patrick and Francis. Margaret died and John married Minnie Louise Yaw and from this marriage were born Florence Mary, Agnes Josephine and Minnie Louise in the early years of the 20th century. John Phillips died in 1902 aged 50. Airmount House became a R.I.C. Barracks from about 1910 to 1921.
3. A freestanding cast-iron water hydrant, c.1880
4. Bellaboy Bridge
5. A carved stone head
