= Killyneary =

Townland in the civil parish of Templeport, County Cavan, Ireland

Coordinates: 54.07514°N 7.810271°W

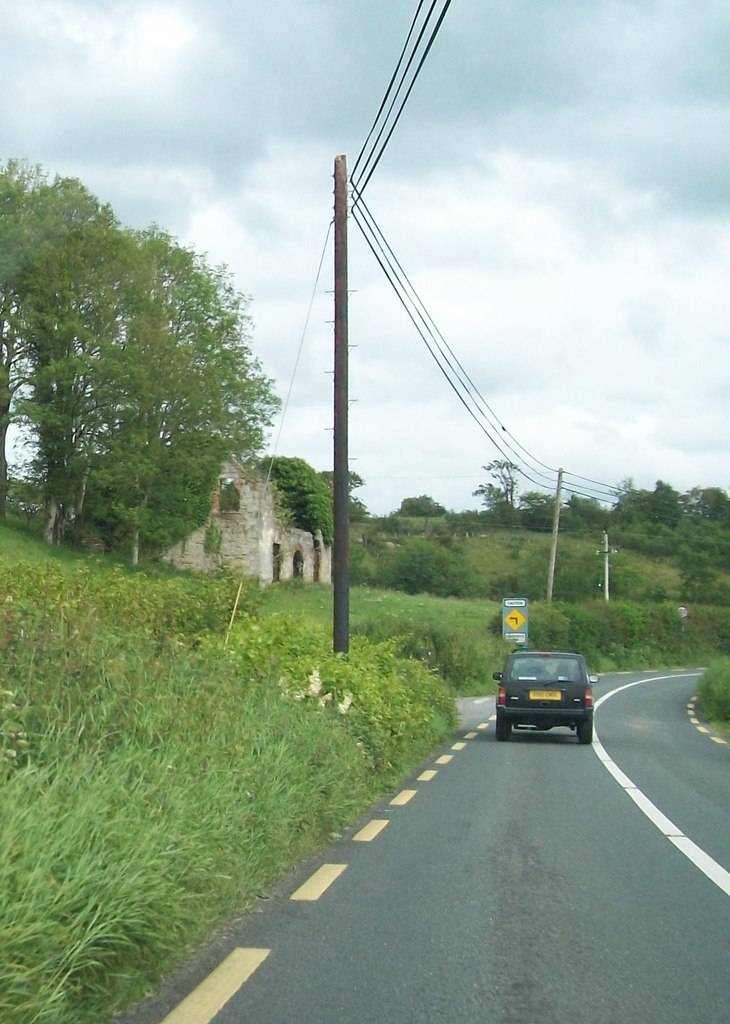
The N87 road at Killyneary townland, Templeport, County Cavan, Ireland, heading south towards Bawnboy village.

Killyneary (from Irish Coill an Aoire meaning 'The Wood of the Shepherd') is a townland in the civil parish of Templeport, County Cavan, Ireland. It lies in the Roman Catholic parish of Templeport and barony of Tullyhaw.

== Geography ==
Killyneary is bounded on the north by Brackley, Templeport townland, on the west by Derrymony townland, on the south by Erraran and Bawnboy townlands and on the east by Carrick East townland. Its chief geographical features are Brackley Lough, forestry plantations, streams, dug wells and a spring well. Killyneary is traversed by the national secondary N87 road (Ireland), minor roads and rural lanes. The townland covers 152 statute acres.

== History ==
In medieval times the McGovern barony of Tullyhaw was divided into economic taxation areas called ballibetoes, from the Irish Baile Biataigh (Anglicized as 'Ballybetagh'), meaning 'A Provisioner's Town or Settlement'. The original purpose was to enable the farmer, who controlled the baile, to provide hospitality for those who needed it, such as poor people and travellers. The ballybetagh was further divided into townlands farmed by individual families who paid a tribute or tax to the head of the ballybetagh, who in turn paid a similar tribute to the clan chief. The steward of the ballybetagh would have been the secular equivalent of the erenagh in charge of church lands. There were seven ballibetoes in the parish of Templeport. Killyneary was located in the ballybetagh of "Balleagheboynagh" (alias 'Ballyoghnemoynagh'). The original Irish is Baile Na Muighe Eanach, meaning 'The Town of the Marshy Plain'). The ballybetagh was also called "Aghawenagh", the original Irish is Achadh an Bhuí Eanaigh, meaning 'The Field of the Yellow Bog').

The 1609 Ulster Plantation Baronial Map depicts the townland as Killinirie.

The 1615 & 1627 Plantation of Ulster grants spell it as Camera and Killyn-Irry, or Killiniry.

The 1652 Commonwealth Survey spells the name as Killeneary.

The 1665 Down Survey map depicts it as Carronary.

William Petty's 1685 map depicts it as Carronary.

In the grants of the early 1600s, Killyneary was split into two poles of land, one went to the Church of Ireland and one to the Graham family. On 25 January 1627 a grant was made of- one pole of Killyn-Irry, or Killiniry to Thomas Groves, the Rector or Vicar of the parish of Templepurt to hold as glebe land of Templeport Church. The said Thomas Groves was the Anglican rector of Templeport parish from 1626 to 1632.

In the Plantation of Ulster by grant dated 26 June 1615, King James VI and I granted, inter alia,- one poll in Camera to Sir George Graeme and Sir Richard Graeme to form part of the Manor of Greame. An Inquisition held at Cavan on 31 October 1627 found that- George Greames was seised as of fee, of 20 polls of land in Co. Cavan, including 1 poll in Camera and he died 9 October 1624. William Greames, his son and heir, was then 30 years old (born 1594) and unmarried. An Inquisition held at Belturbet on 12 June 1661 found that- George Graham, a knight, deceased, in his lifetime was seised as of fee off the town and land of Carrigg, Gosnefrehane and Ballyoghnemoynagh, with several other parcels of land lying in Co. Cavan, containing by estimation 200 acres and with a yearly value, over and above reprises, of £5 sterling. Being seised of such an estate, the aforesaid George by his last will made on 1 May 1615 by and in consideration of his natural affection for William Graham, the younger son of said George, gave the aforesaid town and land with appurtenances to the same William Graham, to his heirs and assigns in perpeuity. The aforesaid William Graham after his father's death, was seised and possessed of these premises by virtue of the said last will, by which the premises were held or are held now without knowledge of the law.

William Graham took part in the Irish Rebellion of 1641 as appears from the following deposition of William Reynolds of Lissanover- folio 260r William Reinoldes of Lisnaore in the parrish of Templeport in the County of Cavan gent sworne & examined deposeth and sajth That about the beginning of the presente Rebellion this deponent was deprived robbed or otherwise dispoiled & Lost by the Rebells: his meanes goodes & chattells concisting of horses mares beasts Cattle Corne hay howsholdstuff implements of husbandry apparell bookes provition silver spoones swyne & the benefite of his howse and six Poles of Land: due debts & other thinges of the value of three hundreth Sixtie fowre Powndes nine shillings sterling. And further sajth That the Rebells that soe robbed & dispojled him of his personall estate are theis that follow vizt Gillernew Mc Gawren & Hugh mc Manus oge mc Gawren both of the Parrish and County of Cavan aforesaid Turlaghe o Rely Brian Groome mc Gowren Daniell mc Gawren & Charles mc Gawren all of the place aforesaid gent: with divers other Rebells whose names he cannott expresse to the number of 30 or thereabouts And further sajth that theis 4 parties next after named (being duly indebted to this deponent) are or lately were in actuall Rebellion & carry armes with for & amongst the Rebells against his Maiesty and his loyall Subjects vizt ffarrell mc Gawren of the parish of Killiney & County aforesaid gent Cornelius ô Sheriden of in the County of ffermanagh gent, William Greames & Phelim mc Gowren both of Templeporte aforesaid gentlemen: And alsoe saith that the parties hereafter mencioned are or lately were alsoe actors in the same present Rebellion & carried armes & did take parts & assist the Rebells vizt ffarrell Broome mc Kallaghan of the Parrish of Templeport Wanderer: whoe as this deponent hath beene credibly tould murthered this deponents owne mother) Phillipp mc Hugh mc Shane o Rely of Ballinecargie in the County of Cavan Esquire now a Colonell of Rebells Capt Myles o Rely his brother Edmund Mc Mulmore o Rely of or nere Ballirely gent & Myles his sonn whoe when the Rebellion began was high sherriff of the said County of Cavan Phillip mc Mulmore o Rely of Ballytrusse Esquire John ô Rely his sonne & heire Sergeant Maio{r} Hugh Boy o Rely, Connor o Rely of Agheraskilly gent, Edmund mc Kernon of the Parrish of Kildallon gent & Edmund his sonn, & William another of his sons; William Greames of Templeport gentleman Owney Sheredin of the parrish of Kilmore gent, Andrew Mc Gowran of Templeport ffarrell mc Acorby of the same & James Brady of the same parrish gent; Cohonaghe Maguire of Aghloone gent Manus ô Mulmoghery of Aghloone aforesaid yeoman Turlogh mc Brian of Vrhoonoghe yeoman: Shane mc Brian of Killsallough, a popish Preist; ffarrell mc Adeggin of Aghavanny yeoman Owen Mc Adeggan of the same & Daniell mc Gowran of Gortneleck gent & Edmund his sonn: & divers others whose names & places of aboad he cannott Remember William Reynolds Jur 6o Apr 1643 Will: Aldrich Hen: Brereton John Sterne: Cavan William Reinolds Jur 6o Apr 1643 Intw Cert fact [Copy at MS 832, fols 59r-59v]

A history of Richard and George Graham is viewable online at-

After the Cromwellian Act for the Settlement of Ireland 1652 the Graham lands in Killyneary were seised by the Government and were distributed as follows-

The 1652 Commonwealth Survey lists the proprietor being The Commonwealth of England and the tenant as being William Lawther who also appears as tenant of several other Templeport townlands in the same survey.

The 1662 Hearth Money Rolls show no Hearth Tax payers in Killyneary.

In the Templeport Poll Book of 1761 there were only two people registered to vote in Killyneary in the 1761 Irish general election - Henry Pratt and Richard Jackman. They were entitled to two votes. Both voted for Lord Newtownbutler (later Brinsley Butler, 2nd Earl of Lanesborough) who was elected Member of Parliament for Cavan County and for George Montgomery (MP) of Ballyconnell who lost the election. Absence from the poll book either meant a resident did not vote or more likely was not a freeholder entitled to vote, which would mean most of the inhabitants of Killyneary.

A lease dated 10 December 1774 from William Crookshank to John Enery of Bawnboy includes the lands of Killinery. A further deed by John Enery dated 13 December 1774 includes the lands of Killinery otherwise Killanery.

The 1790 Cavan Carvaghs list spells the name as Killenery.

The Tithe Applotment Books for 1827 list nine tithepayers in the townland.

The Killyneary Valuation Office Field books are available for November 1839.

Griffith's Valuation of 1857 lists seven landholders in the townland.

== Census ==
Year	Population	Males	Females	Total Houses	Uninhabited
1841	33	18	15	6	0
1851	34	16	18	5	0
1861	37	20	17	6	0
1871	33	14	19	6	0
1881	31	14	17	7	1
1891	25	8	17	6	1

In the 1901 census of Ireland, there are five families listed in the townland, and in the 1911 census of Ireland, there are only three families listed in the townland.

== Antiquities ==
There do not seem to be any structures of historical interest in Killyneary.
