= Ballynamaddoo =

Townland in County Cavan, Ireland

Coordinates: 54.1302°N 7.6537°W

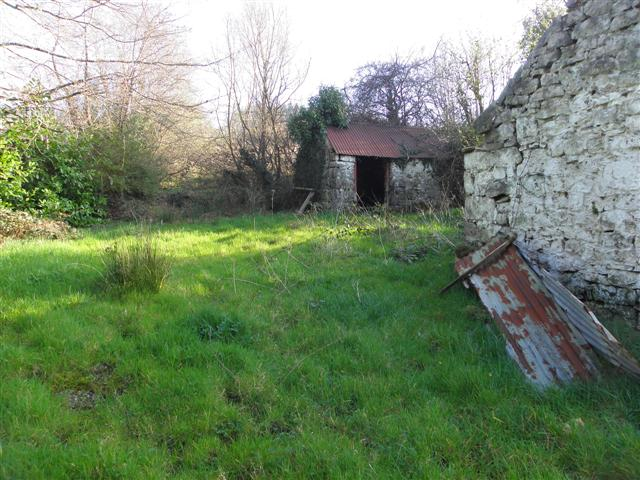
Ruined farm buildings in Ballynamaddoo townland

Ballynamaddoo (from Irish Baile na Mada meaning 'Town of the Dogs (or Foxes)') is a townland in the civil parish of Templeport, County Cavan, Ireland. It lies in the Roman Catholic parish of Templeport and barony of Tullyhaw.

== Geography ==
Ballynamaddoo is bounded on the northwest by Gortnavreeghan townland, on the west by Bawnboy townland, on the south by Corrasmongan and Killycrin townlands and on the east by Gowlagh North and Corneen townlands. Its chief geographical features are Slieve Rushen mountain on whose western slope it lies, mountain streams, mountain bogs, forestry plantations and dug wells. It forms part of the Slieve Rushen Bog Natural Heritage Area. Ballynamaddoo is traversed by minor roads and rural lanes. The townland covers 234 statute acres.

== History ==
In medieval times the McGovern barony of Tullyhaw was divided into economic taxation areas called ballibetoes, from the Irish Baile Biataigh (Anglicized as 'Ballybetagh'), meaning 'A Provisioner's Town or Settlement'. The original purpose was to enable the farmer, who controlled the baile, to provide hospitality for those who needed it, such as poor people and travellers. The ballybetagh was further divided into townlands farmed by individual families who paid a tribute or tax to the head of the ballybetagh, who in turn paid a similar tribute to the clan chief. The steward of the ballybetagh would have been the secular equivalent of the erenagh in charge of church lands. There were seven ballibetoes in the parish of Templeport. Ballynamaddoo was located in the ballybetagh of "Balleagheboynagh" (alias 'Ballyoghnemoynagh'). The original Irish is Baile Na Muighe Eanach, meaning 'The Town of the Marshy Plain'). The ballybetagh was also called "Aghawenagh", the original Irish is Achadh an Bhuí Eanaigh, meaning 'The Field of the Yellow Bog').

Until the Cromwellian Act for the Settlement of Ireland 1652, Ballynamaddoo formed part of the modern townland of Corrasmongan and its history is the same till then.

An Inquisition held at Belturbet on 12 June 1661 found that George Greames was seized of, inter alia, Ballyoghnemoynagh and he died 9 October 1624. By his will dated 1 May 1615 he left his lands to his son and heir William Greames then 30 years old (born 1594) and unmarried. After the Cromwellian Act for the Settlement of Ireland 1652 the Graham family were still in possession of Ballynamaddoo.

In the Hearth Money Rolls of 1662 there was nobody paying the Hearth Tax in Ballynamadoo.

Ambrose Leet's 1814 Directory spells the name as Ballinamaddy.

The Tithe Applotment Books for 1827 list fourteen tithepayers in the townland.

The Ballynamaddoo Valuation Office Field books are available for November 1839.

Griffith's Valuation of 1857 lists twenty three landholders in the townland.

A local tradition states that the townland name derives from a dog which was killed by the black pig of the Black Pig's Dyke legend.

== Census ==
Year	Population	Males	Females	Total Houses	Uninhabited
1841	70	34	36	13	1
1851	66	31	35	10	0
1861	61	32	29	12	0
1871	53	29	24	11	0
1881	54	29	25	10	0
1891	48	24	24	9	0

In the 1901 census of Ireland, there are nine families listed in the townland and in the 1911 census of Ireland, there are only seven families listed in the townland.

== Antiquities ==
There don't seem to be any structures of historical interest in the townland.
