= Erraran =

Townland in the civil parish of Templeport, County Cavan, Ireland

Coordinates: 54.07514°N 7.810271°W

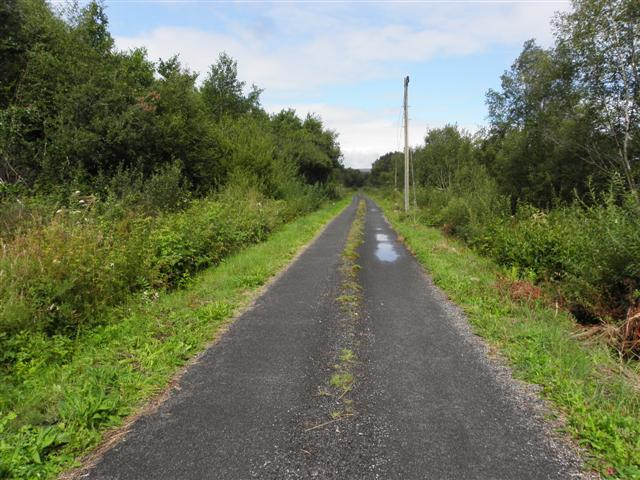
Road at Erraran townland, Templeport, County Cavan, Ireland, leading NNW to Derrymony.

Erraran (from Irish Airearan, meaning 'Land bordering a Lake' (i.e. Brackley Lake) is a townland in the civil parish of Templeport, County Cavan, Ireland. It lies in the Roman Catholic parish of Templeport and barony of Tullyhaw.

== Geography ==
Erraran is bounded on the north by Derrymony and Killyneary townlands, on the west by Tirnawannagh and Gortnacargy townlands in Corlough parish, on the south by Newtown, Templeport and Kilsob townlands and on the east by Bawnboy townland. Its chief geographical features are Brackley Lough, Lough Namoyle (Loch na Maoile = The Lake of the Bare Hill), a stream and dug wells. Erraran is traversed by minor roads and rural lanes. The townland covers 155 statute acres.

== History ==
In medieval times the McGovern barony of Tullyhaw was divided into economic taxation areas called ballibetoes, from the Irish Baile Biataigh (Anglicized as 'Ballybetagh'), meaning 'A Provisioner's Town or Settlement'. The original purpose was to enable the farmer, who controlled the baile, to provide hospitality for those who needed it, such as poor people and travellers. The ballybetagh was further divided into townlands farmed by individual families who paid a tribute or tax to the head of the ballybetagh, who in turn paid a similar tribute to the clan chief. The steward of the ballybetagh would have been the secular equivalent of the erenagh in charge of church lands. There were seven ballibetoes in the parish of Templeport. Erraran was located in the ballybetagh of "Bally Cloinelogh" (alias 'Bally Cloynelough'). The original Irish is Baile Cluain Loch, meaning 'The Town of the Lake Meadow')

The 1609 Ulster Plantation Baronial Map depicts the townland as Brurin.

The 1652 Commonwealth Survey spells the name as Oreren.

The 1665 Down Survey map depicts it as Errierrin.

In a grant dated 23 June 1610, along with other lands, King James VI and I granted the townland as: Urrerin, 1 poll, to Shane McCabee, gent. Shane McCabe then sold the townland to Walter Talbot of Ballyconnell who died on 26 June 1625 and his son James Talbot succeeded to the Ballyconnell estate aged just 10 years. An Inquisition held in Cavan on 20 September 1630 found that James Talbot was seized of one poll of Uzren, along with other lands. In 1635 James Talbot married Helen Calvert, the daughter of George Calvert, 1st Baron Baltimore of Maryland, USA. In the Cromwellian Act for the Settlement of Ireland 1652, James Talbot's estate was confiscated because he was a Catholic and he was granted an estate in 1655 at Castle Rubey, County Roscommon instead. He died in 1687. Talbot's land in Erraran was distributed as follows-

The 1652 Commonwealth Survey lists the proprietor of Oreren as being Mr Robert Reece.

In the Hearth Money Rolls of 1662 there were no people paying the Hearth Tax in Erraran.

A grant dated 30 January 1668 was made by King Charles II of England to John French in ye pole of Araron containing 25 acres and 2 roods at an annual rent of £0- 6s-10 1/2d.

A grant dated 9 September 1669 from King Charles II of England to Arthur Annesley, 1st Earl of Anglesey included, inter alia, part of Urrierren containing 53 acres at an annual rent of £0-14s-3 1/2d and in the same 13 acres at £0-3s-6d.

A deed dated 23 December 1720 between Morley Saunders and John Enery includes the lands of Urraran, which it describes as Mr. Frenche's part, (i.e. the aforesaid John French).

A deed dated 24 December 1720 between Morley Saunders and John Enery includes the lands of Uraran, which it describes as Lord Anglesey's part, (i.e. the aforesaid Arthur Annesley).

A deed dated 13 Nov 1738 includes: Lord Anglesseys part of Urraran.

A lease dated 10 December 1774 from William Crookshank to John Enery of Bawnboy includes the lands of Urraran. A further deed by John Enery dated 13 December 1774 includes the lands of Frenche's part of Urraran otherwise Urraren.

The 1790 Cavan Carvaghs list spells the name as Uriron.

A rental of the Annesley Estate dated c.1802 where it is spelled Urreran, refers to a Quire Lease from the Annesley estate to the tenant Robert Cross.

The Tithe Applotment Books for 1827 list seven tithepayers in the townland.

In 1833 one person in Erraran was registered as a keeper of weapons- Pat Magauran, who owned two guns.

The Erraran Valuation Office Field books are available for September 1839.

Griffith's Valuation of 1857 lists seven landholders in the townland.

== Census ==
Year	Population	Males	Females	Total Houses	Uninhabited
1841	68	41	27	10	0
1851	34	17	17	6	0
1861	30	14	16	5	0
1871	27	11	16	4	0
1881	27	14	13	4	0
1891	24	14	10	4	0

In the 1901 census of Ireland, there are four families listed in the townland and in the 1911 census of Ireland, there are still four families listed in the townland.

== Antiquities ==
There don't appear to be any structures of historical interest in the townland apart from a graphitised iron cauldron which was found near a crannog in multiple fragments.
