= Killycrin =

Townland in the civil parish of Templeport, County Cavan, Ireland

Coordinates: 54.07514°N 7.810271°W

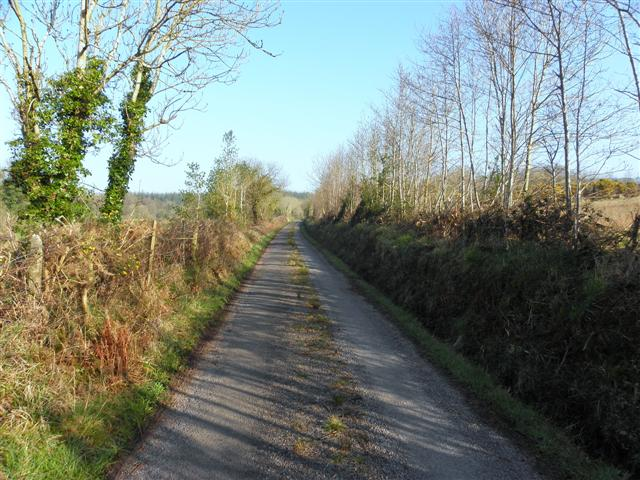
Road at Killycrin townland, Templeport, County Cavan, Ireland, heading north.

Killycrin (from Irish Coill an Chrainn meaning 'The Wood of the Tree') is a townland in the civil parish of Templeport, County Cavan, Ireland. It lies in the Roman Catholic parish of Templeport and barony of Tullyhaw.

== Geography ==
Killycrin is bounded on the north by Gowlagh North and Ballynamaddoo townlands, on the west by Corrasmongan townland, on the south by Muinaghan and Kilsallagh townlands and on the east by Killywaum townland. Its chief geographical features are a gravel pit, a stream, a dug well and a spring well. Killycrin is traversed by the regional N87 road (Ireland), minor roads and rural lanes. The townland covers 166 statute acres.

== History ==
In medieval times the McGovern barony of Tullyhaw was divided into economic taxation areas called ballibetoes, from the Irish Baile Biataigh (Anglicized as 'Ballybetagh'), meaning 'A Provisioner's Town or Settlement'. The original purpose was to enable the farmer, who controlled the baile, to provide hospitality for those who needed it, such as poor people and travellers. The ballybetagh was further divided into townlands farmed by individual families who paid a tribute or tax to the head of the ballybetagh, who in turn paid a similar tribute to the clan chief. The steward of the ballybetagh would have been the secular equivalent of the erenagh in charge of church lands. There were seven ballibetoes in the parish of Templeport. Killycrin was located in the ballybetagh of "Balleagheboynagh" (alias 'Ballyoghnemoynagh'). The original Irish is Baile Na Muighe Eanach, meaning 'The Town of the Marshy Plain'). The ballybetagh was also called "Aghawenagh", the original Irish is Achadh an Bhuí Eanaigh, meaning 'The Field of the Yellow Bog').

On 12 November 1590 Queen Elizabeth I of England granted a pardon (No. 5489) to Patrick O Doylane, husbandman of Killecrynn for fighting against the Queen's forces.

The 1609 Ulster Plantation Baronial Map depicts the townland as Kilcrine.

In the Plantation of Ulster Killycrin was granted to the Graham family of Scotland. By grant dated 26 June 1615, King James VI and I granted, inter alia, one poll in Killchrine to Sir George Graeme and Sir Richard Graeme to form part of the Manor of Greame. An Inquisition held at Cavan Town on 31 October 1627 found that Sir Richard Greames of Corrasmongan died on 7 November 1625 seized of, inter alia, one poll in Kilkryne. His son and heir Thomas Greames was aged 40 (born 1585) and married.

The Grahams fought on the Irish side during the Irish Rebellion of 1641 and, as a result after the end of the war, the Cromwellian Act for the Settlement of Ireland 1652 confiscated their lands in Killycrin and distributed them as follows-

The 1652 Commonwealth Survey lists the townland as Killecrum with the proprietor being Mr Thomas Worsopp and the tenant being William Lawther, both of whom appear as proprietor and tenant for several other Templeport townlands in the same survey.

In the Hearth Money Rolls compiled on 29 September 1663, there were six Hearth Tax payers in Killicreene- Patricke McGowen, Murtagh McGowen, Cahell McGowen, Owen McIlronan, Farrall McCurran and James McCurran.

A deed dated 19 May 1736 by Owen Wynne includes the lands of Killycryn.

In the Templeport Poll Book of 1761 no resident of Killycrin was registered to vote in the 1761 Irish general election but Christopher Lowther of Lowfield townland, Kilmore parish, County Roscommon voted because he held a freehold in Killycrin and was entitled to two votes. The four election candidates were Charles Coote, 1st Earl of Bellomont and Lord Newtownbutler (later Brinsley Butler, 2nd Earl of Lanesborough), both of whom were then elected Member of Parliament for Cavan County. The losing candidates were George Montgomery (MP) of Ballyconnell and Barry Maxwell, 1st Earl of Farnham. Lowther voted for Newtownbutler and Maxwell. Absence from the poll book either meant a resident did not vote or more likely was not a freeholder entitled to vote, which would mean most of the inhabitants of Killycrin.

The 1790 Cavan Carvaghs list spells the name as Kilkrin.

The Tithe Applotment Books for 1827 list ten tithepayers in the townland.

The Killycrin Valuation Office Field books are available for 1839–1840.

Griffith's Valuation of 1857 lists twenty landholders in the townland.

== Census ==
Year	Population	Males	Females	Total Houses	Uninhabited
1841	95	50	45	23	0
1851	70	37	33	17	1
1861	62	32	21	13	1
1871	53	32	21	9	0
1881	57	34	23	16	6
1891	42	21	21	8	0

In the 1901 census of Ireland, there are eleven families listed in the townland, and in the 1911 census of Ireland, there are only ten families listed in the townland.

== Antiquities ==
The chief items of historical interest found in the townland are Neolithic flint scrapers and a polished stone axehead.
