= Killywaum =

Townland in County Cavan, Ireland

Coordinates: 54.07514°N 7.810271°W

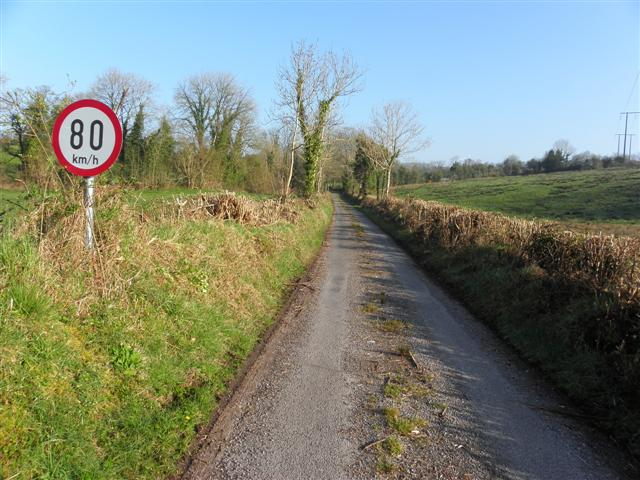
Road at Killywaum townland, Templeport, County Cavan, Ireland, heading north.

Killywaum (from Irish Coill an Mháma meaning ‘Wood of the Chasm) is a townland in the civil parish of Templeport, County Cavan, Ireland. It lies in the Roman Catholic parish of Templeport and barony of Tullyhaw.

== Geography ==
Killywaum is bounded on the north by Corneen and Gowlagh North townlands, on the west by Killycrin and Kilsallagh townlands and on the southwest by Munlough North townland. Its chief geographical features are a stream and cow pastures. The Ordnance Survey Namebooks for 1836 state- There is a light soil intermixed with boulders of free stone. Killywaum is traversed by the national secondary N87 road (Ireland), minor roads, and rural lanes. The townland covers 102 statute acres.

== History ==
In medieval times the McGovern barony of Tullyhaw was divided into economic taxation areas called ballibetoes, from the Irish Baile Biataigh (Anglicized as 'Ballybetagh'), meaning 'A Provisioner's Town or Settlement'. The original purpose was to enable the farmer, who controlled the baile, to provide hospitality for those who needed it, such as poor people and travellers. The ballybetagh was further divided into townlands farmed by individual families who paid a tribute or tax to the head of the ballybetagh, who in turn paid a similar tribute to the clan chief. The steward of the ballybetagh would have been the secular equivalent of the erenagh in charge of church lands. There were seven ballibetoes in the parish of Templeport. Killywaum was located in the ballybetagh of "Balleagheboynagh" (alias 'Ballyoghnemoynagh'). The original Irish is Baile Na Muighe Eanach, meaning 'The Town of the Marshy Plain'). The ballybetagh was also called "Aghawenagh", the original Irish is Achadh an Bhuí Eanaigh, meaning 'The Field of the Yellow Bog').

Until after the Cromwellian Act for the Settlement of Ireland 1652, the townland of Killywaum formed a sub-division of Kilsallagh townland and its history is the same up until then.

The 1652 Commonwealth Survey lists the townland as Kilmame, with the proprietor being Mr Thomas Worsopp and the tenant being William Lawther, both of whom appear as proprietor and tenant for several other Templeport townlands in the same survey.

A deed by Thomas Enery dated 29 Jan 1735 includes the lands of Killiwamey.

A deed by John Enery dated 13 December 1774 includes the lands of Killiwamey otherwise Killywaine.

The 1790 Cavan Carvaghs list spells the name as Kilvome.

A lease dated 17 September 1816 by John Enery of Bawnboy includes Killywamey otherwise Killawam.

The Tithe Applotment Books for 1827 list seventeen tithepayers in the townland.

The Killywaum Valuation Office Field books are available for December 1839.

Griffith's Valuation of 1857 lists fourteen landholders in the townland.

== Census ==
Year	Population	Males	Females	Total Houses	Uninhabited
1841	57	33	24	8	0
1851	48	29	19	7	0
1861	44	23	21	9	0
1871	27	12	15	6	0
1881	29	13	16	5	0
1891	16	8	8	3	0

In the 1901 census of Ireland, there are three families listed in the townland and in the 1911 census of Ireland, there are only two families listed in the townland.
