= Muinaghan =

Townland in the civil parish of Templeport, County Cavan, Ireland

Coordinates: 54.07514°N 7.810271°W

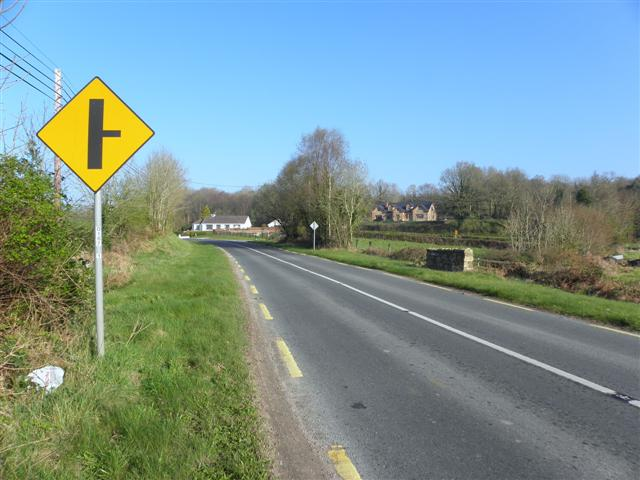
Road at Muinaghan townland, Templeport, County Cavan, Ireland, heading north-west to Bawnboy.

Muinaghan (from Irish Muineachán meaning 'A Shrubbery' - Local pronunciation is 'Meenaghan') is a townland in the civil parish of Templeport, County Cavan, Ireland. It lies in the Roman Catholic parish of Templeport and barony of Tullyhaw.

== Geography ==
Muinaghan is bounded on the north by Corrasmongan and Killycrin townlands, on the west by Kilsob townland, on the south by Kildoagh townland and on the east by Port, Templeport and Kilsallagh townlands. Its chief geographical features are the Bawnboy River, spring wells, dug wells and a gravel pit. Muinaghan is traversed by the national secondary N87 road (Ireland), minor roads and rural lanes. The townland covers 233 statute acres.

== History ==
In medieval times the McGovern barony of Tullyhaw was divided into economic taxation areas called ballibetoes, from the Irish Baile Biataigh (Anglicized as 'Ballybetagh'), meaning 'A Provisioner's Town or Settlement'. The original purpose was to enable the farmer, who controlled the baile, to provide hospitality for those who needed it, such as poor people and travellers. The ballybetagh was further divided into townlands farmed by individual families who paid a tribute or tax to the head of the ballybetagh, who in turn paid a similar tribute to the clan chief. The steward of the ballybetagh would have been the secular equivalent of the erenagh in charge of church lands. There were seven ballibetoes in the parish of Templeport. Muinaghan was located in the ballybetagh of "Balleagheboynagh" (alias 'Ballyoghnemoynagh'). The original Irish is Baile Na Muighe Eanach, meaning 'The Town of the Marshy Plain'). The ballybetagh was also called "Aghawenagh", the original Irish is Achadh an Bhuí Eanaigh, meaning 'The Field of the Yellow Bog').

Until the Cromwellian Act for the Settlement of Ireland 1652, Muinaghan formed part of the modern townland of Corrasmongan, so its history is the same until then.

The 1652 Commonwealth Survey spells the name as Sroohanagh and lists the proprietor as The Lord of Cavan (i.e. Charles Lambart, 1st Earl of Cavan), who also appears as proprietor of several other Templeport townlands in the same survey.

The 1665 Down Survey map depicts it as Drunagh.

William Petty's 1685 map depicts it as Druna.

An 1809 map of ecclesiastical lands in Templeport depicts it as Monaghon.

The 1662 Hearth Money Rolls show no Hearth Tax payers in Muinaghan.

By grant dated 9 September 1669 King Charles II of England gave Arthur Annesley, 1st Earl of Anglesey, inter alia, the lands of Drimagh or Drunagh with an area of 61 acres and 17 perches at an annual rent of £0-16s-5 1/2d.

A deed dated 24 December 1720 between Morley Saunders and John Enery includes the lands of Mynaughan.Memorial extract — Registry of Deeds Index Project

A lease dated 10 December 1774 from William Crookshank to John Enery of Bawnboy includes the lands of Minaughan and Mynaughan. A further deed by John Enery dated 13 December 1774 includes the lands of Minaughan otherwise Mynaghan.

The 1790 Cavan Carvaghs list spells the name as Munaghine.

The Tithe Applotment Books for 1827 list ten tithepayers in the townland.

The Muinaghan Valuation Office Field books are available for 1839-1840.

Griffith's Valuation of 1857 lists twenty eight landholders in the townland. The landlord of Muinaghan in the 1850s was John D. Rochfort of Bawnboy House.

== Fr. Philip McGovern ==
Springhill House in Muinaghan was the residence of Father Philip McGovern, parish priest of Templeport parish from 1826 to 1855. John O'Donovan (scholar) writing in the Ordnance Survey Letters for 16 May 1836 states- We proceeded southwards through the Parish of Templeport with a view of seeing Father Philip Magauran, a lineal descendant of the last chief of the tribe of Eochy (Tullyhaw) but he was not at home. In 1842 Father Theobald Mathew (temperance reformer) addressed a large rally of 27,000 people from Fermanagh, Cavan and Leitrim, at Fr. McGovern's house at Springhill.Bengal Catholic Herald Fr. McGovern was born in Brackley townland and baptised on 13 February 1772. He was in the first year of students to attend the newly opened St Patrick's College, Maynooth, the Irish national seminary. He was ordained a priest in 1798 and matriculated from Maynooth in 1800. He was appointed curate of Cavan town in 1802 and of Crosserlough parish in 1805. In 1811 he was appointed parish priest of Kinawley parish and then from 1826 until his death he was parish priest of Templeport parish. He died on 10 May 1855 aged 83, not 94 as given in the following obituary from the Anglo-Celt newspaper of 17 May 1855- On Thursday, the 10th instant, at his residence Springhill, near Bawnboy, the Very Rev. Philip M'GAURAN, P.P. of Templeport, and Dean of the diocese of Kilmore. The deceased reverend gentleman was in the 94th year of his age, and had been at the time of his death fully 51 years a labourer in the Lord's vineyard. In life his zeal for the glory of Him until whom he ministered was unremitting, nor in the house of death did he forego, for whatever little means he had accumulated in the years of his long and frugal life were distributed amongst the three chapels of the parish to which he was attached, out of a love for the "beauty of God's holies and the place where His glory dwelleth." No board was more hospitable than that of the Rev. Mr. M'Gauran, and yet no life was more temperate than his own, for, from the time that Father Matthew was in this country, fifteen years ago, he was a rigid teeetotaller(sic). And now that he has passed away forever, we may say! that he left few like himself behind; kind, charitable, ardent, social, and enthusiastic. Where shall we find his equal? His memorial plaque in Kildoagh R.C. church is viewable online at DSC_0566. John O'Donovan's statement that Fr. McGovern was a lineal descendant of the last McGovern chief, Colonel Bryan Magauran, seems to be incorrect as the priest's pedigree was Philip, son of Hugh, son of Marcus, son of Thomas. Fr. McGovern's will dated 25 October 1853 is held in the Diocesan Archives of the Roman Catholic Diocese of Kilmore (ref C/39-47) but does not name any McGovern relatives . His executors were Mr Hugh Maguire of Kilsub and Mr. Pat Reilly of Clintycarnahan.

== Census ==
Year	Population	Males	Females	Total Houses	Uninhabited
1841	78	37	41	14	0
1851	84	40	44	15	0
1861	67	33	34	12	0
1871	73	36	37	12	0
1881	77	39	38	12	0
1891	55	28	27	9	0

In the 1901 census of Ireland, there are twelve families listed in the townland, and in the 1911 census of Ireland, there are thirteen families listed in the townland.

== Antiquities ==
The only structures of historical interest in the townland are

1. Springhill House
2. Stepping stones over the stream
