= Corrasmongan =

Townland in County Cavan, Ireland

Coordinates: 54.1206°N 7.6643°W

Corrasmongan (from Irish either Corr Easa Mongáin meaning 'The Hill of Mongan's Waterfall' or more likely Corr Easa Muineachán meaning the 'Hill of the Waterfall in the Thickets') is a townland in the civil parish of Templeport, County Cavan, Ireland. It lies in the Roman Catholic parish of Templeport and barony of Tullyhaw. The local pronunciation is Corasmonaghan.

== Geography ==
Corrasmongan is bounded on the north by Bawnboy and Ballynamaddoo townlands, on the west by Kilsob townland, on the south by Muinaghan townland and on the east by Killycrin townland. Its chief geographical features are a wood, a stream and a dug well. Corrasmongan is traversed by the regional N87 road (Ireland), minor roads and rural lanes. The townland covers 117 statute acres.

== History ==
In medieval times the McGovern barony of Tullyhaw was divided into economic taxation areas called ballibetoes, from the Irish Baile Biataigh (Anglicized as 'Ballybetagh'), meaning 'A Provisioner's Town or Settlement'. The original purpose was to enable the farmer, who controlled the baile, to provide hospitality for those who needed it, such as poor people and travellers. The ballybetagh was further divided into townlands farmed by individual families who paid a tribute or tax to the head of the ballybetagh, who in turn paid a similar tribute to the clan chief. The steward of the ballybetagh would have been the secular equivalent of the erenagh in charge of church lands. There were seven ballibetoes in the parish of Templeport. Corrasmongan was located in the ballybetagh of "Balleagheboynagh" (alias 'Ballyoghnemoynagh'). The original Irish is Baile Na Muighe Eanach, meaning 'The Town of the Marshy Plain'). The ballybetagh was also called "Aghawenagh", the original Irish is Achadh an Bhuí Eanaigh, meaning 'The Field of the Yellow Bog').

Until the Cromwellian Act for the Settlement of Ireland 1652, the modern townlands of Bawnboy, Muinaghan and Ballynamaddoo formed part of Corrasmongan, which also had a sub-division named Aghamoynagh (from Irish Achadh Magh nEach meaning 'The Field of the Horseplain')

On 12 November 1590 Queen Elizabeth I of England granted pardons (No. 5489) to Tiernan O' Doylane of Corresmongan, horsekeeper; Edmond O'Doylan of Aghamoynaghe, cottier; Con O'Doylane of Aghamoynaghe, horsekeeper; Ferdorogh O'Doylane of Aghamoynaghe, husbandman; Brene O'Doylane M'Rowry of Aghamoynaghe, cottier and Patrick M'Echie of Aghamoynaghe, horsekeeper for fighting against the Queen's forces.

The 1609 Ulster Plantation Baronial Map depicts the townland as Cornesinongan.

The 1658 Down Survey Map depicts it as Sr: Will: Parsons Land.

In the Plantation of Ulster Corrasmongan was granted to the Graham family of Scotland. In a visitation by Sir George Carew, 1st Earl of Totnes in autumn 1611, he states that- Sir George Greames and Sir Richard Greames 1,000 acres apiece in the Barony of Tolehagh as servitors, have taken possession but done nothing. By 1613 the Grahams had progressed with building work. Sir Josias Bodley reported on 6 February 1613 that- Sir George and Sir Richard Greame have cause a bawn to be built of ill stone and worse lime, and worst of all flanked, being not yet above 5 feet and a half in height, and about a yard in breadth, and almost 4 score feet square. The work was at a stand and no man there to answer for their further proceedings. The country is exceeding fast, and requireth to be well and sufficiently planted. Sir Richard Greames, they say, hath made over his share thereof to his son-in-law. By grant dated 26 June 1615, King James VI and I granted, inter alia, two polls in Corsmongan to Sir George Graeme and Sir Richard Graeme to form part of the Manor of Greame. By 1619 Captain Nicholas Pynnar's Survey of Land Holders found that Sir Richard and Sir George Grimes have 2,000 acres. Upon this there is built a Bawne of Stone and Lime, 60 feet square and 10 feet high, with a little House in it. In August 1622 another survey found that- Sir Richard Greames, holdeth 1000 acres of this land, upon which there is built a Bawne of stone and lyme, sixty foot square and nine foot high, with a little stone house within, where in Lieutenant William Ruttledge dwelleth and hath a lease thereof and of 200 acres of land for 21 yeares and the rest of Sir Richard’s 1000 acres are sett to the Irish from yeare to yeare, who plowgh after ye Irish fashion. An Inquisition held at Cavan Town on 31 October 1627 found that Sir Richard Greames of Corrasmongan died on 7 November 1625 seized of, inter alia, one poll in Corrismongan otherwise known as Aghowvonagh. His son and heir Thomas Greames was aged 40 (born 1585) and married. Further that George Greames was also seized of one poll in Corrismongan and he died 9 October 1624. By his will dated 1 May 1615 he left his lands to his son and heir William Greames then 30 years old (born 1594) and unmarried.

William Graham took part in the Irish Rebellion of 1641 as appears from the following deposition of William Reynolds of Lissanover-

folio 260r William Reinoldes of Lisnaore in the parrish of Templeport in the County of Cavan gent sworne & examined deposeth and sajth That about the begining of the presente Rebellion this deponent was deprived robbed or otherwise dispoiled & Lost by the Rebells: his meanes goodes & chattells concisting of horses mares beasts Cattle Corne hay howsholdstuff implements of husbandry apparell bookes provition silver spoones swyne & the benefite of his howse and six Poles of Land: due debts & other thinges of the value of three hundreth Sixtie fowre Powndes nine shillings sterling. And further sajth That the Rebells that soe robbed & dispojled him of his personall estate are theis that follow vizt Gillernew Mc Gawren & Hugh mc Manus oge mc Gawren both of the Parrish and County of Cavan aforesaid Turlaghe o Rely Brian Groome mc Gowren Daniell mc Gawren & Charles mc Gawren all of the place aforesaid gent: with divers other Rebells whose names he cannott expresse to the number of 30 or thereabouts And further sajth that theis 4 parties next after named (being duly indebted to this deponent) are or lately were in actuall Rebellion & carry armes with for & amongst the Rebells against his Maiesty and his loyall Subjects vizt ffarrell mc Gawren of the parish of Killiney & County aforesaid gent Cornelius ô Sheriden of in the County of ffermanagh gent, William Greames & Phelim mc Gowren both of Templeporte aforesaid gentlemen: And alsoe saith that the parties hereafter mencioned are or lately were alsoe actors in the same present Rebellion & carried armes & did take parts & assist the Rebells vizt ffarrell Broome mc Kallaghan of the Parrish of Templeport Wanderer: whoe as this deponent hath beene credibly tould murthered this deponents owne mother) Phillipp mc Hugh mc Shane o Rely of Ballinecargie in the County of Cavan Esquire now a Colonell of Rebells Capt Myles o Rely his brother Edmund Mc Mulmore o Rely of or nere Ballirely gent & Myles his sonn whoe when the Rebellion began was high sherriff of the said County of Cavan Phillip mc Mulmore o Rely of Ballytrusse Esquire John ô Rely his sonne & heire Sergeant Maio{r} Hugh Boy o Rely, Connor o Rely of Agheraskilly gent, Edmund mc Kernon of the Parrish of Kildallon gent & Edmund his sonn, & William another of his sons; William Greames of Templeport gentleman Owney Sheredin of the parrish of Kilmore gent, Andrew Mc Gowran of Templeport ffarrell mc Acorby of the same & James Brady of the same parrish gent; Cohonaghe Maguire of Aghloone gent Manus ô Mulmoghery of Aghloone aforesaid yeoman Turlogh mc Brian of Vrhoonoghe yeoman: Shane mc Brian of Killsallough, a popish Preist; ffarrell mc Adeggin of Aghavanny yeoman Owen Mc Adeggan of the same & Daniell mc Gowran of Gortneleck gent & Edmund his sonn: & divers others whose names & places of aboad he cannott Remember William Reynolds Jur 6o Apr 1643 Will: Aldrich Hen: Brereton John Sterne: Cavan William Reinolds Jur 6o Apr 1643 Intw Cert fact [Copy at MS 832, fols 59r-59v]

A history of Richard and George Graham is viewable online.

After the Cromwellian Act for the Settlement of Ireland 1652 the Graham lands in Corrasmongan were seized by the Government as a result of their participation in the 1641 Rebellion and were distributed as follows-

The 1652 Commonwealth Survey lists the townland as Crossmongan with the proprietor being Mr Thomas Worsopp and the tenant being William Lawther, both of whom appear as proprietor and tenant for several other Templeport townlands in the same survey. The 1662 Hearth Money Rolls show no Hearth Tax payers in Corrasmongan.

A lease dated 10 December 1774 from William Crookshank to John Enery of Bawnboy includes the lands of Corresmuggan.

The 1790 Cavan Carvaghs list spells the name as Corsmuggan.

The Corrasmongan Valuation Office Field books are available for November 1839.

Griffith's Valuation of 1857 lists twelve tenant landholders in the townland with landlord John D. Rochfort.

== Census ==
| Year | Population | Males | Females | Total Houses | Uninhabited |
|---|---|---|---|---|---|
| 1841 | 49 | 28 | 21 | 8 | 0 |
| 1851 | 41 | 22 | 19 | 6 | 0 |
| 1861 | 33 | 15 | 18 | 6 | 0 |
| 1871 | 36 | 19 | 17 | 5 | 0 |
| 1881 | 40 | 20 | 20 | 7 | 2 |
| 1891 | 32 | 18 | 14 | 6 | 1 |

In the 1901 census of Ireland, there are five families listed in the townland, and in the 1911 census of Ireland, there are still five families listed in the townland.

== Antiquities ==
The chief structures of historical interest in the townland are

1. The burial ground for Bawnboy Workhouse
2. Stepping stones over the stream
