= Kilsallagh =

Townland in the civil parish of Templeport, County Cavan, Ireland

Coordinates: 54.07514°N 7.810271°W

Kilsallagh (from Irish Coill Salach meaning 'Muddy or Boggy Wood') is a townland in the civil parish of Templeport, County Cavan, Ireland. It lies in the Roman Catholic parish of Templeport and barony of Tullyhaw.

== Geography ==
Kilsallagh is bounded on the north by Killycrin townland, on the west by Muinaghan and Port, Templeport townlands, on the south by Cor, Templeport townland and on the east by Keenagh, Templeport, Munlough North and Killywaum townlands. Its chief geographical features are two streams, some spring wells and dug wells. The Ordnance Survey Namebooks for 1836 state- The soil is of a light yellow clay, intermixed with boulders of freestone. Kilsallagh is traversed by the regional N87 road (Ireland), minor roads and rural lanes. The crossroads named Father Terence's Cross was named after the nearby residence of the local Roman Catholic curate at the time, Terence Magauran, who was curate of Templeport parish from 1849 to 1877 and later parish priest from 1877 to 1896. The townland covers 169 statute acres.

== History ==
In medieval times the McGovern barony of Tullyhaw was divided into economic taxation areas called ballibetoes, from the Irish Baile Biataigh (Anglicized as 'Ballybetagh'), meaning 'A Provisioner's Town or Settlement'. The original purpose was to enable the farmer, who controlled the baile, to provide hospitality for those who needed it, such as poor people and travellers. The ballybetagh was further divided into townlands farmed by individual families who paid a tribute or tax to the head of the ballybetagh, who in turn paid a similar tribute to the clan chief. The steward of the ballybetagh would have been the secular equivalent of the erenagh in charge of church lands. There were seven ballibetoes in the parish of Templeport. Kilsallagh was located in the ballybetagh of "Balleagheboynagh" (alias 'Ballyoghnemoynagh'). The original Irish is Baile Na Muighe Eanach, meaning 'The Town of the Marshy Plain'). The ballybetagh was also called "Aghawenagh", the original Irish is Achadh an Bhuí Eanaigh, meaning 'The Field of the Yellow Bog').

Until after the Cromwellian Act for the Settlement of Ireland 1652 the modern townland of Killywaum formed a sub-division of Kilsallagh.

The 1609 Ulster Plantation Baronial Map depicts the townland as Kilsallagh.

The 1652 Commonwealth Survey lists the townland as Kilsallagh.

An 1809 map of the ecclesiastical lands in Templeport depicts it as Kilsoldagh, with a sub-division on the north-east entitled Gortinawaghey.

On 19 January 1586 Queen Elizabeth I of England granted a pardon (No. 4813) to Ferriell M'Manus M'Thomas Magawran of Killsollaghe for fighting against the Queen's forces. The said Farrell McGovern was the grandson of Tomás mac Maghnus Mág Samhradháin who was chief of the McGovern Clan from 1512 to 1532.

In the Plantation of Ulster by grant dated 26 June 1615, King James VI and I granted, inter alia, two polls in Kilsallagh to Sir George Graeme and Sir Richard Graeme to form part of the Manor of Greame. An Inquisition held at Cavan Town on 31 October 1627 found that Sir Richard Greames of Corrasmongan died on 7 November 1625 seized of, inter alia, one poll in Kilsallagh. His son and heir Thomas Greames was aged 40 (born 1585) and married. Further that George Greames was also seized of one poll in Kilsallagh and he died 9 October 1624. By his will dated 1 May 1615 he left his lands to his son and heir William Greames then 30 years old (born 1594) and unmarried.

Father Shane McBrian, the Roman Catholic curate of Templeport, lived in the townland in the 1640s and took part in the Irish Rebellion of 1641, according to the following deposition of William Reynolds of Lissanover-

folio 260r William Reinoldes of Lisnaore in the parrish of Templeport in the County of Cavan gent sworne & examined deposeth and sajth That about the beginning of the presente Rebellion this deponent was deprived robbed or otherwise dispoiled & Lost by the Rebells: his meanes goodes & chattells concisting of horses mares beasts Cattle Corne hay howsholdstuff implements of husbandry apparell bookes provition silver spoones swyne & the benefite of his howse and six Poles of Land: due debts & other thinges of the value of three hundreth Sixtie fowre Powndes nine shillings sterling. And further sajth That the Rebells that soe robbed & dispojled him of his personall estate are theis that follow vizt Gillernew Mc Gawren & Hugh mc Manus oge mc Gawren both of the Parrish and County of Cavan aforesaid Turlaghe o Rely Brian Groome mc Gowren Daniell mc Gawren & Charles mc Gawren all of the place aforesaid gent: with divers other Rebells whose names he cannott expresse to the number of 30 or thereabouts And further sajth that theis 4 parties next after named (being duly indebted to this deponent) are or lately were in actuall Rebellion & carry armes with for & amongst the Rebells against his Maiesty and his loyall Subjects vizt ffarrell mc Gawren of the parish of Killiney & County aforesaid gent Cornelius ô Sheriden of in the County of ffermanagh gent, William Greames & Phelim mc Gowren both of Templeporte aforesaid gentlemen: And alsoe saith that the parties hereafter mencioned are or lately were alsoe actors in the same present Rebellion & carried armes & did take parts & assist the Rebells vizt ffarrell Broome mc Kallaghan of the Parrish of Templeport Wanderer: whoe as this deponent hath beene credibly tould murthered this deponents owne mother) Phillipp mc Hugh mc Shane o Rely of Ballinecargie in the County of Cavan Esquire now a Colonell of Rebells Capt Myles o Rely his brother Edmund Mc Mulmore o Rely of or nere Ballirely gent & Myles his sonn whoe when the Rebellion began was high sherriff of the said County of Cavan Phillip mc Mulmore o Rely of Ballytrusse Esquire John ô Rely his sonne & heire Sergeant Maio{r} Hugh Boy o Rely, Connor o Rely of Agheraskilly gent, Edmund mc Kernon of the Parrish of Kildallon gent & Edmund his sonn, & William another of his sons; William Greames of Templeport gentleman Owney Sheredin of the parrish of Kilmore gent, Andrew Mc Gowran of Templeport ffarrell mc Acorby of the same & James Brady of the same parrish gent; Cohonaghe Maguire of Aghloone gent Manus ô Mulmoghery of Aghloone aforesaid yeoman Turlogh mc Brian of Vrhoonoghe yeoman: Shane mc Brian of Killsallough, a popish Preist; ffarrell mc Adeggin of Aghavanny yeoman Owen Mc Adeggan of the same & Daniell mc Gowran of Gortneleck gent & Edmund his sonn: & divers others whose names & places of aboad he cannott Remember William Reynolds Jur 6o Apr 1643 Will: Aldrich Hen: Brereton John Sterne: Cavan William Reinolds Jur 6o Apr 1643 Intw Cert fact [Copy at MS 832, fols 59r-59v]

After the Cromwellian Act for the Settlement of Ireland 1652, the Graham family's lands in Kilsallagh were confiscated and distributed as follows-

The 1652 Commonwealth Survey lists the proprietor as Mr Thomas Worsopp and the tenant as William Lawther, both of whom appear as proprietor and tenant for several other Templeport townlands in the same survey.

A deed dated 19 May 1736 by Owen Wynne includes the lands of Killsallagh.

The 1790 Cavan Carvaghs list spells the townland name as Kilsallagh.

The Tithe Applotment Books for 1827 list twenty six tithepayers in the townland.

In 1833 one person in Kilsallagh was registered as a keeper of weapons- James Delacy.

The Kilsallagh Valuation Office Field books are available for November 1839.

Griffith's Valuation of 1857 lists seventeen landholders in the townland. The landlord of Kilsallagh in the 1850s was the Reverend Sir James King.

== Census ==
| Year | Population | Males | Females | Total Houses | Uninhabited |
|---|---|---|---|---|---|
| 1841 | 127 | 60 | 67 | 23 | 0 |
| 1851 | 81 | 38 | 43 | 15 | 0 |
| 1861 | 80 | 40 | 40 | 14 | 0 |
| 1871 | 69 | 33 | 36 | 14 | 0 |
| 1881 | 68 | 37 | 31 | 14 | 0 |
| 1891 | 70 | 33 | 37 | 14 | 0 |

In the 1901 census of Ireland, there are sixteen families listed in the townland, and in the 1911 census of Ireland, there are twelve families listed in the townland.

== Antiquities ==
There don't seem to be any structures of historical interest in the townland apart from 'Mountain View'Mountain View, KILSALLAGH (TULLYHAW BY.), County Cavan cottage and a footstick over a stream.
