= Gortnavreeghan =

Townland in County Cavan, Ireland

Coordinates: 54.07514°N 7.810271°W

Gortnavreeghan (from Irish Gort na bhFraochán meaning 'Field of the Bilberries') is a townland in the civil parish of Templeport, County Cavan, Ireland. It lies in the Roman Catholic parish of Templeport and barony of Tullyhaw.

== Geography ==
Gortnavreeghan is bounded on the north by Brackley, Templeport townland, on the west by Carrick East and Bawnboy townlands, on the southeast by Ballynamaddoo and Corneen townlands and on the east by Mullanacre Upper townland in Tomregan parish. Its chief geographical features are Slieve Rushen mountain on whose western slope it lies, three small mountain lakes including Miles' Lough, mountain streams, mountain bogs and forestry plantations. It forms part of the Slieve Rushen Bog Natural Heritage Area. Gortnavreeghan is traversed by minor roads and rural lanes. The townland covers 383 statute acres.

== History ==
In medieval times the McGovern barony of Tullyhaw was divided into economic taxation areas called ballibetoes, from the Irish Baile Biataigh (Anglicized as 'Ballybetagh'), meaning 'A Provisioner's Town or Settlement'. The original purpose was to enable the farmer, who controlled the baile, to provide hospitality for those who needed it, such as poor people and travellers. The ballybetagh was further divided into townlands farmed by individual families who paid a tribute or tax to the head of the ballybetagh, who in turn paid a similar tribute to the clan chief. The steward of the ballybetagh would have been the secular equivalent of the erenagh in charge of church lands. There were seven ballibetoes in the parish of Templeport. Gortnavreeghan was located in the ballybetagh of "Balleagheboynagh" (alias 'Ballyoghnemoynagh'). The original Irish is Baile Na Muighe Eanach, meaning 'The Town of the Marshy Plain'). The ballybetagh was also called "Aghawenagh", the original Irish is Achadh an Bhuí Eanaigh, meaning 'The Field of the Yellow Bog').

The 1609 Ulster Plantation Baronial Map depicts the townland as Gortnefreaghagh.

The 1652 Commonwealth Survey spells the townland as Gortnevrioghan.

The 1665 Down Survey map depicts the townland as Gortnewragh.

William Petty's 1685 map depicts it as Gortnewra.

In the Plantation of Ulster by grant dated 26 June 1615, King James VI and I granted, inter alia, one poll in Gortnefreighan to Sir George Graeme and Sir Richard Graeme to form part of the Manor of Greame. An Inquisition held at Cavan Town on 31 October 1627 found that George Greames was seized of one poll in Gortnafreighane and he died 9 October 1624. By his will dated 1 May 1615 he left his lands to his son and heir William Greames then 30 years old (born 1594) and unmarried. An Inquisition held at Belturbet on 12 June 1661 found that George Greames was seized of, inter alia, Gosnefrehane and he died 9 October 1624. By his will dated 1 May 1615 he left his lands to his son and heir William Greames then 30 years old (born 1594) and unmarried.

The 1652 Commonwealth Survey lists the proprietor being Mr Thomas Worsopp and the tenant being William Lawther, both of whom appear as proprietor and tenant for several other Templeport townlands in the same survey.

The 1662 Hearth Money Rolls show no Hearth Tax payers in Gortnavreeghan.

A lease dated 23 January 1717 from Morley Saunders to John Enery of Bawnboy includes one pole of land in Gortnafreechan.

A lease dated 10 December 1774 from William Crookshank to John Enery of Bawnboy includes the lands of Gortnafrechan. A further deed by John Enery dated 13 December 1774 includes the lands of Gortnefreec otherwise Gortnefreeghan.

The 1790 Cavan Carvaghs list spells the name as Gortnefrechan.

A lease dated 17 September 1816 John Enery of Bawnboy includes Gortnefreechan otherwise called the two Gortnafrahans.

The Tithe Applotment Books for 1827 list fifty four tithepayers in the townland.

In 1833 one person in Gortnavreeghan was registered as a keeper of weapons- Peter O'Hara.

The Gortnavreeghan Valuation Office Field books are available for November 1839.

Griffith's Valuation of 1857 lists fifteen landholders in the townland.

== Census ==
Year	Population	Males	Females	Total Houses	Uninhabited
1841	81	50	31	12	0
1851	67	33	34	13	0
1861	41	19	22	12	0
1871	43	18	25	6	0
1881	35	17	18	7	1
1891	46	21	25	7	0

In the 1901 census of Ireland, there are eight families listed in the townland, and in the 1911 census of Ireland, there are only six families listed in the townland.

== Antiquities ==
The only structure of historical interest in the townland is a limekiln.
