= Lakefield, Templeport =

Townland in the civil parish of Templeport, County Cavan, Ireland

Coordinates: 54.07514°N 7.810271°W

Lakefield is a townland in the civil parish of Templeport, County Cavan, Ireland. It lies in the Roman Catholic parish of Templeport and barony of Tullyhaw.

== Geography ==
Lakefield is bounded on the north by Newtown, Templeport townland, on the south by Mullaghmore, Templeport townland and on the east by Kilsob townland. Its chief geographical features are Lakefield Lough, a sand pit and dug wells. Lakefield is traversed by minor roads and rural lanes. The townland covers 87 statute acres.

== History ==
In medieval times the McGovern barony of Tullyhaw was divided into economic taxation areas called ballibetoes, from the Irish Baile Biataigh (Anglicized as 'Ballybetagh'), meaning 'A Provisioner's Town or Settlement'. The original purpose was to enable the farmer, who controlled the baile, to provide hospitality for those who needed it, such as poor people and travellers. The ballybetagh was further divided into townlands farmed by individual families who paid a tribute or tax to the head of the ballybetagh, who in turn paid a similar tribute to the clan chief. The steward of the ballybetagh would have been the secular equivalent of the erenagh in charge of church lands. There were seven ballibetoes in the parish of Templeport. Lakefield was located in the ballybetagh of Bally Gortnekargie (Irish "Gort na Carraige", meaning 'The Field of the Rock').

The 1609 Ulster Plantation Baronial Map depicts the townland as part of Gortnacargie (now the modern townland of Gortnacargy in Corlough parish).

The 1652 Commonwealth Survey spells the name as Doone.

The 1665 Down Survey map depicts it as Downe.

In the Plantation of Ulster by grant dated 27 February 1610, King James VI and I granted the lands of Gortnekargie containing 4 polls, Dowrie containing 1 poll and Corneha containing 1 poll comprising a total of 300 acres at an annual rent of £3-4s., to John O’Reily and Connor O’Reily, gentlemen. By a deed dated 10 May 1611 between the said Connor McCahir O’Relly of Cargeagh-Callne in County Cavan, gent and John O’Relly of Gortingarge, County Cavan, gent by which they divide between them the 6 poules of land gotten at the last Plantation of the county, viz, the poules of Gortinesimonie, Tirenavan, Dinrewelle, Dune, Dongary and Cornahagh, of which Connor obtained the three first; who is to pay John 10 shillings English yearly in satisfaction of a gallon of land. An Inquisition held at Cavan Town on 31 March 1626 found that the said Cornelius O’Rely, recently of Gortincarge, County Cavan deceased, was seized of said townland of Gortincarge containing 4 polls of land, namely Gortinshemore, Downe and Tyrenewonagh and 2 polls of land in Downe and Corneha. He died on 3 November 1625. His daughter and heir Mor O’Rely was then 15 years old and married. John O’Reily and Connor O’Reily seem to be the great-great grandsons of the chief of the O'Reilly clan, Eamón mac Maolmórdha O’Reilly of Kilnacrott, who ruled East Breifne from October 1596 – 1601. Their genealogy is Conchobhar & Seaán sons of Cathaoir Óg son of Aodh son of Cathaoir son of Eamón of Kilnacrott son of Maolmórdha son of Seaán son of Cathal.

The aforesaid O'Reilly lands in Lakefield were confiscated in the Cromwellian Act for the Settlement of Ireland 1652 and were distributed as follows-

The 1652 Commonwealth Survey lists the proprietor as being William Brampson, who also appears as proprietor for several other Templeport townlands in the same survey.

A grant dated 3 November 1666 was made by King Charles II of England to Sir Tristram Beresford, 1st Baronet which included, inter alia, the lands of Downe. By grant dated 11 September 1670 from King Charles II of England to said Sir Tristram Beresford, the said lands of Downe were included in the creation of a new Manor of Beresford.

A grant dated 30 January 1668 was made by King Charles II of England to William Bramston of half a cartron of lands in Downe containing 16 acres 2 roods.

By a deed dated 7 January 1746 between- Veaitch Betty of Kilsob in the County of Cavan, Gentleman of the one part and Bryan Reilly & Patrick McKiernan of Middle Kilsob of the other part, the said Veaitch Betty leased land for 21 years to said Bryan Reilly & Patrick McKiernan in Middle Killsob. Witnesses: Terence Kiernan of the City of Dublin & John Beatty of Swadlingbar & George Booth near Drumersnaw, Co. Leitrim.

The aforesaid Reverend Veaitch Betty of Lakefield, Templeport by his will dated 16 July 1783 (Born 1709. Died August 1785. Probate granted July 1796) stated- To be buried in the vault I made at Temple Piert. To my dear wife Mary Betty the houses and demesne of Lakefield with the mill race and ten acres whereon the mill is built provided she keeps unmarried, and after her demise to my eldest son Rowland Betty. To my daughters, Susanna Betty and Ann Betty, £300 each to be paid out of the lands of Kilsob. To my second son William Betty the farm of land known as Middle Kilsob or Gortenane, and his heirs. To my eldest son Rowland Betty the lands of Newtown known by the name of Tony McCallan, the farm of Lower Kilsob and the farm of Mullaghmore, the above lands not to be taken over until my debts and the children's fortunes are paid. Should either son die without male heirs then to the elder surviving daughter of either. To my said son William Beatty the lease of Gortnacarrig, County Cavan, made to me by the Right Honourable Lord Farnham and the lease of Lavaghmore, Co. Leitrim, made to me by Samuel Campbell, Esq. To my granddaughter Isabella Simpson twenty pounds to be paid by her uncle William Betty when she marries or comes of age. Ten shillings each to the poorest widows or orphans of Templepiert and Drumreilly. A debt of nearly £100 is owed to me by Rev. Mr. Swanne. Executors to be my wife Mary Betty and my sons Rowland and William. Witnesses: Thomas Farrelly, Hugh Bannan and John Logan. Codicil dated 27 September 1784. The bequest to my wife also includes the peninsula of Rus and Francis McTaggart’s houses to enable her to support my daughters to whom I bequeath an additional £200 each. To my son William that part of Mullaghmore formerly in the possession of Andrew Brady and now in possession of Farrell Logan, the farm near Bawnboybridge now in the possession of Arthur and William Ennis, those parts of Gortnacarrigg and Lavagh Middle and Kilsob now in the possession of the Gilronans and Michael Ward, Thomas Farrelly and Flin and that part called Ruserk in the possession of Laurence Bannan (subject to a rent of Col. Wynne), and his heirs, and in default to said Rowland Betty and his heirs male, etc. and in default to my own right heirs. Witnesses: Thomas Farrelly, Hugh Bannan, Michael Logan. Memorial witnessed by: John Farrelly and Hugh Bannan 503, 380, 324301 William Betty (seal) sworn at Cavan 12 July 1796.

Ambrose Leet's 1814 Directory spells the name as Lakefield with the resident being Rev. Betty (Rowland Betty was the Church of Ireland curate of Templeport).

In 1833 one person in Lakefield was registered as a keeper of weapons- William Henry Brien.

The Tithe Applotment Books for 1827 list five tithepayers in the townland.

The 1836 Ordnance Survey Namebooks state- The townland is bounded on the S. side by a large lake, on the N. bank of which is situated a gentleman's seat of the same name as the townland. It has however fallen greatly into decay these some years back.

The Lakefield (spelled Larkfield) Valuation Office Field books are available for 1839-1840.

Griffith's Valuation of 1857 lists four landholders in the townland.

== Census ==
Year	Population	Males	Females	Total Houses	Uninhabited
1841	11	5	6	1	0
1851	9	4	5	1	0
1861	6	4	2	1	0
1871	8	2	6	1	0
1881	8	3	5	1	0
1891	7	3	4	1	0

In the 1901 census of Ireland, there are two families listed in the townland, and in the 1911 census of Ireland there is only one family listed in the townland.

== Antiquities ==
1. A crannog 50 metres from the shore in Lakefield Lough (Site number 1580 in Archaeological Inventory of County Cavan, Patrick O’Donovan, 1995, where it is described as- Small, oval, tree-covered island (dims. c. 20m NW-SE; c. 15m NE-SW) in Larkfield Lough, c. 50m from the shoreline.)
2. Two Lime kilns
