= Munlough North =

Townland in the civil parish of Templeport, County Cavan, Ireland

Coordinates: 54.07514°N 7.810271°W

Munlough North (from Irish Móinloch Uachtar meaning 'the Bog Lake, Upper’) is a townland in the civil parish of Templeport, County Cavan, Ireland. It lies in the Roman Catholic parish of Templeport and barony of Tullyhaw. It is named Munlough North to distinguish it from the neighbouring townland of Munlough South.

== Geography ==
Munlough North is bounded on the north by Corneen townland, on the west by Killywaum and Kilsallagh townlands, on the south by Keenagh, Templeport and Munlough South townlands and on the east by Clontycarnaghan and Urhannagh townlands. Its chief geographical features are mountain streams and dug wells. Munlough North is traversed by the national secondary N87 road (Ireland), minor roads and rural lanes. The townland covers 105 statute acres.

== History ==
In medieval times the McGovern barony of Tullyhaw was divided into economic taxation areas called ballibetoes, from the Irish Baile Biataigh (Anglicized as 'Ballybetagh'), meaning 'A Provisioner's Town or Settlement'. The original purpose was to enable the farmer, who controlled the baile, to provide hospitality for those who needed it, such as poor people and travellers. The ballybetagh was further divided into townlands farmed by individual families who paid a tribute or tax to the head of the ballybetagh, who in turn paid a similar tribute to the clan chief. The steward of the ballybetagh would have been the secular equivalent of the erenagh in charge of church lands. There were seven ballibetoes in the parish of Templeport. Munlough North was located in the ballybetagh of "Balleagheboynagh" (alias 'Ballyoghnemoynagh'). The original Irish is Baile Na Muighe Eanach, meaning 'The Town of the Marshy Plain'). The ballybetagh was also called "Aghawenagh", the original Irish is Achadh an Bhuí Eanaigh, meaning 'The Field of the Yellow Bog').

The 1609 Ulster Plantation Baronial Map depicts the townland as Mallowotra.

From medieval times until 1606, the townland formed part of the lands owned by the McGovern (name) clan. William Tyrrell, the brother of Richard Tyrrell of Tyrrellspass, County Westmeath, purchased the townland c.1606 from Cormack McGovern, who was probably the son of Tomas Óg mac Brian Mág Samhradháin, who reigned as chief of the McGovern clan from 1584. A schedule, dated 31 July 1610, of the lands William Tyrrell owned in Tullyhaw prior to the Ulster Plantation included: Mallagh Oghteragh, two poles. The Commissioners of the Plantation stated: We find that Mr William Tirrell hath had ye possession of these polls some 4 years, of some a lesse tyme without title but only by agreement with some of the natives for protection. In the Plantation of Ulster, Tyrrell swapped his lands in Munlough North for additional land in the barony of Tullygarvey where he lived at the time.

The townland was held by the Crown from 1610 until 1615. In a Plantation of Ulster grant dated 26 June 1615, King James VI and I gave, inter alia, two polls in Mullaghvowtra to Sir George Graeme and Sir Richard Graeme to form part of the Manor of Greame. An Inquisition held at Cavan Town on 31 October 1627 found that George Greames was seized of one poll in Mullaowtra and he died 9 October 1624. By his will dated 1 May 1615 he left his lands to his son and heir William Greames then 30 years old (born 1594) and unmarried.

In the Irish Rebellion of 1641 Martin Kilhare of Drumlane made a deposition about the rebellion in Munlough as follows-

(239) Martine Killhare of Drumlane in the Countie of Cauan doe depose that my Brother Godferrye Killhare of Munlogh within the parish of Templeporte within the Baronie of Tullahae and Countie of Cauan, had in personale estate when this Rebellione first begane- Cowes ould and younge woorth £64; Horses woorth £20; Corne and haye worth £10; Houshould goods £10; In all £104. All these goods ware taken from him forceably aboute the 24th of October 1641 by the hands of Gillernew mc Gawran, and Manus mc Gawran, both of the parish of Templeport and Baronie of Tullaha and Countie of Cauan gent. Donnell Ogge mc Gawran of the same gent, Brian Ogge Mc Gawran of the same gent., Brian Ogge Mc Gawran of the same gent, and their followers. And further he cannot depose. Signum [mark] predicti Martini 13 Jan: 1641 Jur coram nobis 30 Jan: 1641 Roger Puttocke Will: Hitchcock

After the Cromwellian Act for the Settlement of Ireland 1652, the Graham family's lands in Munlough North were confiscated and distributed as follows-

The 1652 Commonwealth Survey lists the townland as Mullaghoghteragh with the proprietor being The Commonwealth of England and the tenant being Lieutenant John Blackforde, both of whom appear as proprietor in several other Templeport townlands in the same survey.

In the Hearth Money Rolls compiled on 29 September 1663 there was one Hearth Tax payer in Munlagh- Cahir McGawran who had two hearths, which indicates a larger house than normal in the townland.

The 1790 Cavan Carvaghs list spells the name as Munlagh.

An 1809 map of ecclesiastical lands in Templeport depicts Munlough North. The tenant on the land was Mr. Thompson.

The Tithe Applotment Books for 1827 list twenty nine tithepayers in the townland

The Munlough North Valuation Office Field books are available for December 1839.

Griffith's Valuation of 1857 lists eight landholders in the townland.

== Munlough School ==
The book 'Bawnboy and Templeport History Heritage Folklore', by Chris Maguire, gives the following description of the school which was closed in 1977-

MUNLOUGH National School Built 1842. Edward Curran was the teacher. On the morning of 22 November 1849 the school was destroyed by fire, 'set by some parties unknown'. The teacher resigned. Principal Teachers in Munlough N.S.- Master O'Brien (1910-'17); Mrs. Mary Lynch (1917); John Tiernan (1917-'23); Owen Maguire (1923-'28); Michael McElwaine (1929-'34); Martin Fitzgibbon (1934-'36); Gerry Brady (1936-'42); Chris Maguire (1942-'48); Phil Smyth (1948-'61); Thomas Rock (1961-'65); Ciaran Maguire (1965-1977). Assistants: Rose Kellegher; Kathleen Quinn; Philomena Maguire; Margaret Hannon; Ann Russell; Marian McGovern (Collins).

The Reports from the Commissioners of National Education in Ireland give the following figures for Munlough School, Roll No. 8165-

1862: John Baxter was the headmaster and Bridget Baxter was the workmistress, both Roman Catholics. There were 117 pupils, all Roman Catholic apart from 3 who were Church of Ireland. The Catechism was taught to the Catholic pupils on Saturdays from 11am to 1pm.

1874: One male teacher who received an annual salary of £24. There were 87 pupils, 45 boys and 42 girls.

1890: There were 95 pupils.

== Census ==
Year	Population	Males	Females	Total Houses	Uninhabited
1841	43	21	22	6	0
1851	31	17	14	6	1
1861	43	15	28	8	0
1871	34	11	23	6	0
1881	23	7	16	7	2
1891	18	7	11	7	2

In the 1901 census of Ireland, there are eight families listed in the townland, and in the 1911 census of Ireland, there are only six families listed in the townland.

== Antiquities ==
1. An earthen ringfort (Site number 1027 in "Archaeological Inventory of County Cavan", Patrick O’Donovan, 1995, where it is described as- Raised circular area (int. dims. 38.7m NW-SE; 36.9m NE-SW) enclosed by the remains of a substantial earthen bank and a wide, deep fosse. Bank has been reduced down to level of interior, and fosse infilled from SW-W-N. Original entrance not recognisable.).
