= Gowlagh =

Gowlagh (from Irish Gabhlach meaning 'The Fork' [of a mountain stream]) may refer to the following places in the Republic of Ireland:

- Gowlagh North
- Gowlagh South
