= Cor, Templeport =

Townland in the civil parish of Templeport, County Cavan, Ireland

Coordinates: 54.07514°N 7.810271°W

Cor (from Irish either Cor meaning 'A Round Hill' or Corr meaning 'A Hollow') is a townland in the civil parish of Templeport, County Cavan, Ireland. It lies in the Roman Catholic parish of Templeport and barony of Tullyhaw.

== Geography ==
Cor is bounded on the north by Kilsallagh and Keenagh, Templeport townlands, on the west by Port, Templeport townland, on the south by Cloneary townland and on the east by Lissanover townland. Its chief geographical features are a stream, a plantation, a spring well and a stone quarry. Cor is traversed by minor roads and rural lanes. The townland covers 153 statute acres.

== History ==
In medieval times the McGovern barony of Tullyhaw was divided into economic taxation areas called ballibetoes, from the Irish Baile Biataigh (Anglicized as 'Ballybetagh'), meaning 'A Provisioner's Town or Settlement'. The original purpose was to enable the farmer, who controlled the baile, to provide hospitality for those who needed it, such as poor people and travellers. The ballybetagh was further divided into townlands farmed by individual families who paid a tribute or tax to the head of the ballybetagh, who in turn paid a similar tribute to the clan chief. The steward of the ballybetagh would have been the secular equivalent of the erenagh in charge of church lands. There were seven ballibetoes in the parish of Templeport. Cor was located in the ballybetagh of "Balleagheboynagh" (alias 'Ballyoghnemoynagh'). The original Irish is Baile Na Muighe Eanach, meaning 'The Town of the Marshy Plain'). The ballybetagh was also called "Aghawenagh", the original Irish is Achadh an Bhuí Eanaigh, meaning 'The Field of the Yellow Bog').

The 1609 Ulster Plantation Baronial Map depicts the townland as Corr.

The 1652 Commonwealth Survey spells the name as Corr.

The 1665 Down Survey map depicts it as Corre.

William Petty's map of 1685 depicts it as Core.

An 1809 map of the ecclesiastical lands in Templeport depicts it as Curr.

On 19 January 1586 Queen Elizabeth I of England granted a pardon (No. 4813) to Manus Oge M'Manus M'Thomas Magawran of Coor for fighting against the Queen's forces. The said Manus Og McGovern was the grandson of Tomás mac Maghnus Mág Samhradháin who was chief of the McGovern Clan from 1512 to 1532. His son Hugh was granted land in Crossmakelagher, Drumane and Bofealan in 1611 under the Plantation of Ulster.

In the Plantation of Ulster by grant dated 26 June 1615, King James VI and I granted, inter alia, two polls in Cor to Sir George Graeme and Sir Richard Graeme to form part of the Manor of Greame. An Inquisition held at Cavan Town on 31 October 1627 found that George Greames was seized of one poll in Corr and he died 9 October 1624. By his will dated 1 May 1615 he left his lands to his son and heir William Greames then 30 years old (born 1594) and unmarried.

After the Cromwellian Act for the Settlement of Ireland 1652 the Graham lands in Cor were seized by the Government as a result of their participation in the 1641 Rebellion and were distributed as follows-

The 1652 Commonwealth Survey lists the proprietor being Mr Thomas Worsopp and the tenant being William Lawther, both of whom appear as proprietor and tenant for several other Templeport townlands in the same survey.

In the Hearth Money Rolls compiled on 29 September 1663 there were four people paying the Hearth Tax in Corr, Rosse McMahon, Andrew Lowther, Phelemy McRodan and Shane McEvina.

In the 18th century one of the inhabitants of the townland was Jonathan Powell, an ancestor of the author Edgar Allan Poe.

The 1790 Cavan Carvaghs list spells the townland name as Corr.

The Tithe Applotment Books for 1827 list two tithepayers in the townland of Corville.

In 1833 one person in Corville was registered as a keeper of weapons- George Finlay.

The Cor Valuation Office Field books are available for 1839-1841.

In 1841 the population of the townland was 36, being 17 males and 19 females. There were four houses in the townland, all of which were inhabited.

In 1851 the population of the townland was 44, being 19 males and 28 females. There were six houses in the townland, all inhabited.

Griffith's Valuation of 1857 lists seven landholders in the townland.

In 1861 the population of the townland was 21, being 8 males and 13 females. There were five houses in the townland, of which one was uninhabited.

In 1871 the population of the townland was 26, being 9 males and 17 females. There were four houses in the townland, all were inhabited.

In 1881 the population of the townland was 29, being 15 males and 14 females. There were three houses in the townland, all were inhabited.

In 1891 the population of the townland was 20, being 11 males and 9 females. There were three houses in the townland, all were inhabited.

In the 1901 census of Ireland, there are five families listed in the townland, and in the 1911 census of Ireland, there are six families listed in the townland.

== Antiquities ==
The chief structures of historical interest in the townland are

1. An earthen ringfort.
2. Corville House. Corville, COR, County Cavan
3. Woodville House
4. A bronze Early Iron Age ring-headed pin. Bawnboy and Templeport History Heritage and Folklore Bawnboy Pin
