= Corneen =

Townland in County Cavan, Ireland

Coordinates: 54.1299°N 7.6426°W

Corneen (from Irish Cornín meaning ‘A Little Round Hill’) is a townland in the civil parish of Templeport, County Cavan, Ireland. It lies in the Roman Catholic parish of Templeport and barony of Tullyhaw. A sub-division is called Millstone Hill, so named because millstones for the local corn mills were quarried there.

== Geography ==
Corneen is bounded on the north by Gortnavreeghan townland, on the west by Ballynamaddoo, Gowlagh North and Killywaum townlands, on the south by Munlough North townland and on the east by Mullanacre Upper townland in Tomregan parish and by Clontycarnaghan townland. It lies on the southern slope of Slieve Rushen mountain. Nearby is Miles' Lough, a small lake. Chief geographical features are mountain streams, mountain bogs, forestry plantations and dug wells. The southern part of the townland is used for agriculture. It forms part of the Slieve Rushen Bog Natural Heritage Area electronic Irish Statute Book (eISB) Corneen is traversed by minor roads and rural lanes. The townland covers 206 statute acres, extends for about 3.5 kilometres (2.2 mi) from north to south, but is only a few hundred meters wide from west to east.

== History ==
In medieval times the McGovern barony of Tullyhaw was divided into economic taxation areas called ballibetoes, from the Irish Baile Biataigh (Anglicized as 'Ballybetagh'), meaning 'A Provisioner's Town or Settlement'. The original purpose was to enable the farmer, who controlled the baile, to provide hospitality for those who needed it, such as poor people and travellers. The ballybetagh was further divided into townlands farmed by individual families who paid a tribute or tax to the head of the ballybetagh, who in turn paid a similar tribute to the clan chief. The steward of the ballybetagh would have been the secular equivalent of the erenagh in charge of church lands. There were seven ballibetoes in the parish of Templeport. Corneen was located in the ballybetagh of "Ballen Tulchoe" (alias 'Bally Tullagh'). The original Irish is Baile Tulach, meaning 'The Town of the Hillock')

Until the 19th century Corneen formed part of the modern townland of Clontycarnaghan so its history is the same until then.

The Corneen Valuation Office Field books are available for December 1839.

In 1841 the population of the townland was 56, being 29 males and 27 females. There were ten houses in the townland, one of which was uninhabited.

In 1851 the population of the townland was 39, being 22 males and 17 females, the reduction being due to the Great Famine (Ireland). There were eight houses in the townland, two of which were uninhabited.

Griffith's Valuation of 1857 lists ten landholders in the townland.

In 1861 the population of the townland was 44, being 19 males and 25 females. There were eight houses in the townland and all were inhabited.

In 1871 the population of the townland was 42, being 18 males and 24 females. There were seven houses in the townland, all were inhabited.

In 1881 the population of the townland was 39, being 18 males and 21 females. There were six houses in the townland, one of which was uninhabited.

In 1891 the population of the townland was 32, being 17 males and 15 females. There were six houses in the townland, all were inhabited.

In the 1901 census of Ireland, there are nine families listed in the townland, and in the 1911 census of Ireland, there are still nine families listed in the townland.

From the Mountains of Munlough, a book about growing up in Corneen in the 1940s by John Joe Baxter is available at-

== Antiquities ==
The only structures of historical interest in the townland are the Airtricity Wind Farm and footsticks over the stream.
