= Bursan =

Townland in County Cavan, Ireland

Bursan, in Gaelic 'Bus-an' possibly meaning The Little Mouth, is a townland in the civil parish of Templeport, County Cavan, Ireland. It lies in the Roman Catholic parish of Glangevlin and barony of Tullyhaw.

== Geography ==
Bursan is bounded on the north by Dunmakeever townland, on the west by Tullyminister townland, on the east by Commas (Kinawley) townland and on the south by Bellavally Lower townland. Its chief geographical features are the Owenmore River (County Cavan), mountain streams, waterfalls and forestry plantations. Bursan is traversed by minor public roads and rural lanes. The townland covers 406 statute acres.

== History ==
In earlier times the townland was probably uninhabited as it consists mainly of bog and poor clay soils. It was not seized by the English during the Plantation of Ulster in 1610 or in the Cromwellian Settlement of the 1660s so some dispossessed Irish families moved there and began to clear and farm the land.

The 1790 Cavan Carvaghs list spells the name as Bossangrave.

The Tithe Applotment Books for 1826 spell the name as Bussan and list one tithepayer in the townland.

The Ordnance Survey Name Books for 1836 give the following description of the townland- It is altogether a track of barren mountain. The parts reclaimed yield only potatoes &c ...It is bounded on the west and north sides by a large mountain stream which is joined by several from the townland. Sandstone & iron ore can be procured but there is neither of them used for any purpose.

The Bursan Valuation Office Field books are available for August 1839.

Griffith's Valuation of 1857 lists four landholders in the townland.

In the 19th century the landlord of Bursan was Leonard Dobbin.

== Census ==
Year	Population	Males	Females	Total Houses	Uninhabited
1841	10	4	6	2	0
1851	4	2	2	1	0
1861	6	3	3	1	0
1871	8	4	4	1	0
1881	12	7	5	2	0
1891	9	6	3	2	0

In the 1901 census of Ireland, there was one family listed in the townland.

In the 1911 census of Ireland, there was one family listed in the townland.
