= Gortnacargy =

Townland in County Cavan, Ireland

Coordinates: 54.07514°N 7.810271°W

Gortnacargy (from Irish Gort na Carraige meaning The Field of the Rock) is a townland in the civil parish of Templeport, County Cavan, Ireland. It lies in the Roman Catholic parish of Corlough and barony of Tullyhaw.

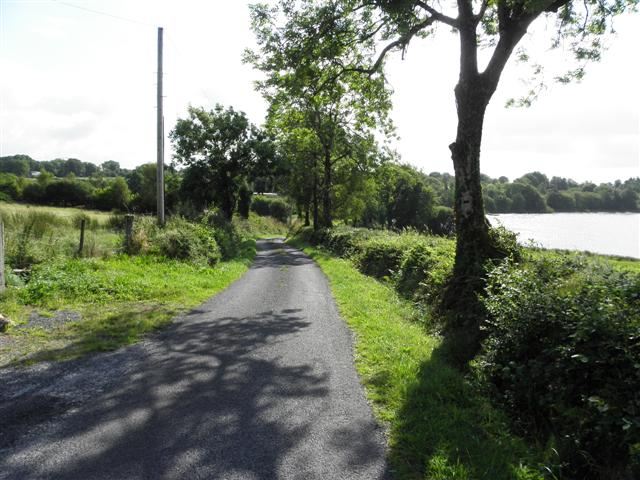
Gortnacargy townland, Corlough parish, County Cavan, Ireland. Heading south-east with Bunerky Lough on right side

== Geography ==
Gortnacargy is bounded on the north by Tirnawannagh townland, on the south by Owengallees townland, on the west by Drumlougher and Teeboy townlands and on the east by Newtown, Templeport and Erraran townlands. Its chief geographical features are Brackley Lough, Bunerky Lough (Irish = Loch Bun Adhairc = The Lake of the Butt of the Horn, it also had an older name Moaneesk (Móin Naosgach = The Bog of the Snipe), Lakefield Lough, Lough Namoyle (Loch na Maoile = The Lake of the Bare Hill), a wood, small streams and dug wells. Gortnacargy is traversed by minor public roads and rural lanes. The townland covers 155 statute acres.

== History ==
The townland was inhabited in the Bronze Age, as is evidenced by the prehistoric cemetery found there.

In medieval times the McGovern barony of Tullyhaw was divided into economic taxation areas called ballibetoes, from the Irish Baile Biataigh (Anglicized as 'Ballybetagh'), meaning 'A Provisioner's Town or Settlement'. The original purpose was to enable the farmer, who controlled the baile, to provide hospitality for those who needed it, such as poor people and travellers. The ballybetagh was further divided into townlands farmed by individual families who paid a tribute or tax to the head of the ballybetagh, who in turn paid a similar tribute to the clan chief. The steward of the ballybetagh would have been the secular equivalent of the erenagh in charge of church lands. There were seven ballibetoes in the parish of Templeport. Gortnacargy was located in the ballybetagh of Bally Gortnekargie, which was named after the townland.

On 12 November 1590 Queen Elizabeth I of England granted a pardon (No. 5489) to Edmund M'Gawran of Gortuckargee, gentleman; Phelim O’Doylane of same and Mahon O’Doylan of same, husbandmen for fighting against the Queen's forces.

The 1609 Ulster Plantation Baronial Map depicts the townland as Gortnacargie.

The 1665 Down Survey map depicts it as Gorteenshinon.

William Petty's 1685 map depicts the townland as Gurtinshinon and Gortinshinah.

In the Plantation of Ulster by grant dated 27 February 1610, King James VI and I granted the lands of Gortnekargie containing 4 polls, Dowrie containing 1 poll and Corneha containing 1 poll comprising a total of 300 acres at an annual rent of £3-4s., to John O’Reily and Connor O’Reily, gentlemen. John O’Reily and Connor O’Reily seem to be the great-great grandsons of the chief of the O'Reilly clan, Eamón mac Maolmórdha O’Reilly of Kilnacrott, who ruled East Breifne from October 1596 – 1601. Their genealogy is Conchobhar & Seaán sons of Cathaoir Óg son of Aodh son of Cathaoir son of Eamón of Kilnacrott son of Maolmórdha son of Seaán son of Cathal.

By a deed dated 10 May 1611 between the said Connor McCahir O’Relly of Cargeagh-Callne in County Cavan, gent and John O’Relly of Gortingarge, County Cavan, gent by which they divide between them the 6 poules of land gotten at the last Plantation of the county, viz, the poules of Gortinesimonie, Tirenavan, Dinrewelle, Dune, Dongary and Cornahagh, of which Connor obtained the three first; who is to pay John 10 shillings English yearly in satisfaction of a gallon of land.

An Inquisition held at Cavan Town on 31 March 1626 found that the said Cornelius O’Rely, recently of Gortincarge, County Cavan deceased, was seized of said townland of Gortincarge containing 4 polls of land, namely Gortinshemore, Downe and Tyrenewonagh and 2 polls of land in Downe and Corneha. He died on 3 November 1625. His daughter and heir Mor O’Rely was then 15 years old and married.

The aforesaid O'Reilly lands in Gortnacargy were confiscated in the Cromwellian Act for the Settlement of Ireland 1652 and were distributed as follows-

The 1652 Commonwealth Survey depicts the townland as Gurteensheemon with the proprietor being William Brampson.

In the Hearth Money Rolls compiled on 29 September 1663 there were three taxpayers in the townland- William Bramston of Gartnecarga, John Bramston of the same, John Petfielde of the same.

A grant dated 30 January 1668 was made from King Charles II of England to William Bramston for the 46 acres and 2 roods in Gortmcshinan at an annual rent of seventeen shillings. A grant dated 9 September 1669 was made from King Charles II of England to Arthur Annesley, 1st Earl of Anglesey, for 31 acres and 2 roods acres in the west part of Gortinshinon at an annual rent of eight shillings and fourpence.

A deed dated 13 Nov 1738 includes: the thirds of Gottnashangan.

The Reverend Veaitch Betty of Lakefield, Templeport by his will dated 16 July 1783 (Born 1709. Died August 1785. Probate granted July 1796) stated- To be buried in the vault I made at Temple Piert. To my dear wife Mary Betty the houses and demesne of Lakefield with the mill race and ten acres whereon the mill is built provided she keeps unmarried, and after her demise to my eldest son Rowland Betty. To my daughters, Susanna Betty and Ann Betty, £300 each to be paid out of the lands of Kilsob. To my second son William Betty the farm of land known as Middle Kilsob or Gortenane, and his heirs. To my eldest son Rowland Betty the lands of Newtown known by the name of Tony McCallan, the farm of Lower Kilsob and the farm of Mullaghmore, the above lands not to be taken over until my debts and the children's fortunes are paid. Should either son die without male heirs then to the elder surviving daughter of either. To my said son William Beatty the lease of Gortnacarrig, County Cavan, made to me by the Right Honourable Lord Farnham and the lease of Lavaghmore, Co. Leitrim, made to me by Samuel Campbell, Esq. To my granddaughter Isabella Simpson twenty pounds to be paid by her uncle William Betty when she marries or comes of age. Ten shillings each to the poorest widows or orphans of Templepiert and Drumreilly. A debt of nearly £100 is owed to me by Rev. Mr. Swanne. Executors to be my wife Mary Betty and my sons Rowland and William. Witnesses: Thomas Farrelly, Hugh Bannan and John Logan.

Codicil dated 27 September 1784. The bequest to my wife also includes the peninsula of Rus and Francis McTaggart’s houses to enable her to support my daughters to whom I bequeath an additional £200 each. To my son William that part of Mullaghmore formerly in the possession of Andrew Brady and now in possession of Farrell Logan, the farm near Bawnboybridge now in the possession of Arthur and William Ennis, those parts of Gortnacarrigg and Lavagh Middle and Kilsob now in the possession of the Gilronans and Michael Ward, Thomas Farrelly and Flin and that part called Ruserk in the possession of Laurence Bannan (subject to a rent of Col. Wynne), and his heirs, and in default to said Rowland Betty and his heirs male, etc. and in default to my own right heirs. Witnesses: Thomas Farrelly, Hugh Bannan, Michael Logan. Memorial witnessed by: John Farrelly and Hugh Bannan 503, 380, 324301 William Betty (seal) sworn at Cavan 12 July 1796.

The 1790 Cavan Carvaghs list spells the name as Gortinshimon.

The Tithe Applotment Books for 1827 list five tithepayers in the townland.

The 1836 Ordnance Survey Namebooks state- The soil is light, being intermixed with limestone...the townland is bounded on the south side by a large lake.

The Gortnacargy Valuation Office Field books are available for 1839–1840.

In 1841 the population of the townland was 51, being 27 males and 24 females. There were eight houses in the townland, all of which were inhabited.

In 1851 the population of the townland was 24, being 14 males and 10 females, the reduction being due to the Great Famine (Ireland). There were five houses in the townland, all were inhabited.

Griffith's Valuation of 1857 lists fourteen landholders in the townland.

In 1861 the population of the townland was 22, being 15 males and 7 females. There were seven houses in the townland and all were inhabited.

In 1871 the population of the townland was 32, being 18 males and 14 females. There were four houses in the townland, all were inhabited.

In 1881 the population of the townland was 26, being 16 males and 10 females. There were four houses in the townland, all were inhabited.

In 1891 the population of the townland was 21, being 13 males and 8 females. There were four houses in the townland, all were inhabited.

In the 1901 census of Ireland, there are six families listed in the townland, and in the 1911 census of Ireland, there are six families listed in the townland.

== Antiquities ==
1. A prehistoric graveyard described in the 1995 'Archaeological Inventory of County Cavan’ (Site No. 162) as- Prior to excavation, the site comprised a low, grass-covered natural knoll of limestone (dims. 11m E-W x 10m N-S; H 0.5m). Three separate graves which reputedly contained extended skeletons, one of which was accompanied by a rimsherd of pottery of food vessel type, were discovered when the cemetery was disturbed during the course of construction of an underground water storage tank in 1956. The site was subsequently excavated by Ó Ríordáin in 1957 yielding a further seven burials, several animal teeth and bones, numerous potsherds and other artifacts, among them a small blue glass bead and chert scrapers. All but one of the skeletons were orientated NW-SE with the skull at NW, and placed individually in their own grave extended on their backs.
2. A lime-kiln
