= Port, Templeport =

Townland in the civil parish of Templeport, County Cavan, Ireland

Port
- Townland
- Interactive map of Port
- Country: Ireland
- Civil parish: Templeport
- County: County Cavan

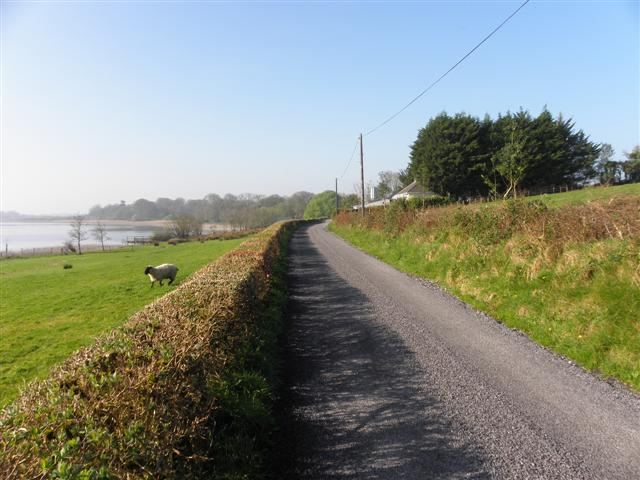
Road beside Templeport Lough, County Cavan, Ireland, heading west.

Port (from Irish Port meaning 'A Landing-Place') is a townland in the civil parish of Templeport, County Cavan, Ireland. It lies in the Roman Catholic parish of Templeport and barony of Tullyhaw.

== Geography ==
Port is bounded on the north by Muinaghan townland, on the west by Kildoagh and Corboy Glebe townlands, on the south by Ray, Templeport and Cloneary townlands and on the east by Cor, Templeport and Kilsallagh townlands. Its chief geographical features are Templeport Lough, Inch Island, woods, streams and spring wells. Port is traversed by minor public roads and rural lanes. The townland covers 335 statute acres.

== Etymology ==
The old name of the townland was Templeport (now shortened to Port) which is the anglicisation of the Gaelic Teampall An Phoirt ("The Church of the Port or Bank or Landing-Place"). The church referred to is the old church on St. Mogue's Island in the middle of Port Lake. This church fell into disuse in medieval times and a new church was built on the opposite shore of the lake. It was forfeited to Queen Elizabeth in 1590 and started use as St Peter's parish church, Templeport after the Plantation. In 1634 the Protestant Bishop of Kilmore, William Bedell imposed the sum of £40 for re-edifying works to the church building. It is very unlikely that the island church ever served as the parish church because there was only one boat available and it would have been extremely inconvenient if not logistically impossible for hundreds of worshipers to go to and from the church in time for mass, especially in rough winter weather. It was built firstly for the convenience of any pilgrim wishing to go to St. Mogue's birthplace and secondly as an interment or mortuary chapel for the few family members attending burials on the island.

== History ==
The 1609 Baronial Map depicts the townland as Aghavanme (probably Irish 'Achadh an Mhanaigh' meaning "The Field of the Monk").

The 1652 Commonwealth Survey lists the townland Aghowanny.

The 1665 Down Survey map depicts it as Port.

William Petty's 1685 map depicts it as Port.

An 1809 map of ecclesiastical lands in Templeport depicts the townland as Templeport with a subdivision in the northeast part named Portlargy (from Irish Port Láirge meaning 'The Hillside of the Landing-Place')

Saint Máedóc of Ferns, also known as St. Mogue or Aidan, was born in the island of 'Breaghwee' in Templeport Lake about 558 A.D. This is an Anglicisation or even Latinisation of the Irish Inis Brechmaighe meaning the 'Island of the Wolf Plain', now called Inch Island which is an abbreviation and duplication of the Irish word Inis. The earliest surviving mention of the name seems to be c.1200 in the Latin Life of St. Mogue, which spells it as Brecrimaige. The Papal annates for 1426 spell it as Inisbrechiruigy alias Tempullapuyrt.

The earliest mention of the townland name in the annals of Ireland is in the Annals of the Four Masters for 1496 A.D.- M1496.17- Magauran, i.e. Donnell Bearnagh, Chief of Teallach-Eachdhach, was treacherously slain before the altar of the church of Teampall-an-phuirt, by Teige, the son of Hugh, son of Owen Magauran; and the marks of the blows aimed at him are still visible in the corners of the altar.

The church had two different rights, one was ownership of the church lands (both termon lands and the site of the church and graveyard) and the other was ownership of the church tithes (also called the rectorial tithes or the rectory) which were a tenth of all the produce of the lands within the parish which were not owned by the church. These rights were often owned by different people and so had a different history, as set out below.

Church Lands

Port formed part of the termon or hospital lands belonging to Templeport Church and so its history belongs to the ecclesiastical history of the parish. It would have belonged to the parish priest and the erenach family rather than the McGovern chief. The earliest mention of the name in the Vatican archives is for 2 September 1414- To the archdeacon of Kilmore. Mandate to collate and assign to Magonius Macamragan, priest, of the diocese of Kilmore, if found fit, the perpetual vicarage, value not exceeding 6 marks, of Insula Brechungy alias Tempullapuret in the said diocese, collation and provision of which, on its voidance by the death of Andrew Macgamragan, was made to him by bishop Nicholas. He doubts whether the said collation and provision of the said vicarage which, as the pope has learned, is still void as above, holds good. Dignum [arbitramur]. In the 16th century these ecclesiastical lands in Templeport were seized in the course of the Reformation in Ireland and kept first by the English monarch and then eventually granted to the Anglican Bishop of Kilmore.

An Inquisition held in Cavan Town on 20 June 1588 valued the total vicarage of Templeport at £10.

An Inquisition held in Cavan Town on 19 September 1590 found the termon or hospital lands of Templeport to consist of four polls of land at a yearly value of 4 shillings. Port was one of these four polls.

By grant dated 6 March 1605, along with other lands, King James VI and I granted a lease of the farm, termons or hospitals of Tampleporte containing 4 pulls for 21 years at an annual rent of 10 shillings to Sir Garret Moore, 1st Viscount Moore. Port was one of these four pulls.

By grant dated 10 August 1607, along with other lands, King James VI and I granted a further lease of the farms, termons or hospitals of Templeport containing 2 pulls for 21 years at an annual rent of 13 shillings to the aforesaid Sir Garret Moore, 1st Viscount Moore of Mellifont Abbey, County Louth. This grant covered the two extra polls of ecclesiastical land in the parish which had been overlooked in the previous inquisitions and grants.

A survey held by Sir John Davies (poet) at Cavan Town on 6 September 1608 stated that- the ecclesiastical lands of Templeporte were containing 6 pulls lying near the parish church and that the rectory was appropriated to the Abbey of Kells, County Meath. Port was one of these six pulls.

An Inquisition held in Cavan Town on 25 September 1609 found the termon land of Templeport to consist of six polls of land, out of which the Bishop of Kilmore was entitled to a rent of 10 shillings and 2/3rd of a beef per annum. Port was one of these six polls. The Inquisition then granted the lands to the Protestant Bishop of Kilmore.

By a deed dated 6 April 1612, Robert Draper, the Anglican Bishop of Kilmore and Ardagh granted a joint lease of 60 years over the termons or herenachs of, inter alia, 6 polls in Templepurt to Oliver Lambart, 1st Lord Lambart, Baron of Cavan, of Kilbeggan, County Westmeath and Sir Garret Moore, 1st Viscount Moore, of Mellifont Abbey, County Louth. Port formed part of the six polls in this lease.

By deed dated 17 July 1639, William Bedell, the Anglican Bishop of Kilmore, extended the above lease of Templepart to Oliver Lambert’s son, Charles Lambart, 1st Earl of Cavan.

The 1652 Commonwealth Survey lists the proprietor as The Lord of Cavan (i.e. Charles Lambart, 1st Earl of Cavan), who also appears as proprietor of several other Templeport townlands in the same survey.

Rectorial Tithes

From medieval times the rectorial tithes were split between the local parish priest who received 1/3 and the Abbey of Kells who received 2/3, until they were seized in the 16th century Dissolution of the Monasteries.

A list of the rectories owned by King Henry VIII in 1542 included Templeporte.

In 1587 Queen Elizabeth I granted the rectory of Templeporte to Garret (otherwise Gerald) Fleming of Cabragh.

On 30 October 1603 the aforementioned Gerrald Fleming surrendered the rectory of Templeporte to King James VI and I and it was regranted to him for a term of 21 years.

By grant dated 22 December 1608, along with other lands, King James VI and I granted a lease of the rectories, churches, or chapels formerly belonging to Kells Abbey, including Templeporte to Gerald Fleminge of Cabragh, County Cavan.

On 4 March 1609 the aforementioned Gerrald Fleming sold the rectory of Templeporte to his son James Fleming and Walter Talbot of Ballyconnell. On 8 June 1619 the aforesaid James Fleming and Walter Talbot were pardoned by King James VI and I for obtaining the said rectory of Templeport without getting a licence from the king.

An Inquisition held at Cavan on 19 October 1616 stated that the aforementioned Gerald Fleming died on 5 April 1615 and his son Thomas Fleming (born 1589) succeeded to the rectorial tithes of Templeporte.

In 1622 Thomas Moigne, the Anglican Bishop of Kilmore made a visitation to the parish. He found that the rectory was impropriate to the vicar of Templeport, John Patrick, who was not a resident, but that there was a curate resident. The annual value of the rectory was £20. The church was in a ruinous condition and the parsonage was a timber house.

On 9 March 1669 King Charles II of England granted to Josias Hallington, incumbent of Templeport, Co. Cavan, the rectory of the said parish, forever.

18th century onwards

Major Edward Magauran was born in Ballymagovern, County Cavan on 16 April 1746, the grandson of Colonel Bryan Magauran, the Chief of the McGovern Clan who fought in the Battle of the Boyne for King James II against William III of Orange. In his book Memoirs of Major M’Gauran, Volume I, Page 127 (London 1786), he states (about the year 1765)- Upon my return from Luxemburg, the General wrote to Mr. John M'Gauran, of Port, in the County of Cavan, married to Ann O'Donnel, the General's cousin-german, telling him that a cousin of his, grand-son of Colonel Bryan M'Gauran, and son of Mary O'Donnel, was serving then in Loudon's regiment, quartered where he resided. Mr. M'Gauran, jealous of my prosperity, having many young sons of his own, whom he thought better entitled to the General's protection; but, notwithstanding, though he knew me to be his own near relation, wrote to the General, to inform him that I was not the son of Mary O'Donnel, but an impostor. The General shewed me the letter, and asked me the truth, which I told him, together with the motives I had for not revealing it sooner; all of which he approved, and matters seemed to be accommodated.

In the Templeport Poll Book of 1761 there was only one landowner in Port registered to vote in the 1761 Irish general election - Reverend Peter Lombard, who was the Church of Ireland rector of Templeport parish from 1732 to 1767. He resided in Clooncorick townland, Carrigallen Parish, County Leitrim. He was entitled to cast two votes. The four election candidates were Charles Coote, 1st Earl of Bellomont and Lord Newtownbutler (later Brinsley Butler, 2nd Earl of Lanesborough), both of whom were then elected Member of Parliament for Cavan County. The losing candidates were George Montgomery (MP) of Ballyconnell and Barry Maxwell, 1st Earl of Farnham. Lombard voted for Maxwell and Montgomery. Absence from the poll book either meant a resident did not vote or, more likely, was not a freeholder entitled to vote, which would mean most of the inhabitants of Port.

The 1790 Cavan Carvaghs list spells the name as Purt.

The 1809 map of ecclesiastical lands in Templeport depicts Port as still belonging to the Anglican Church of Ireland. The tenants on the land were- Robert Hume, Hugh Reilly, the widow of M. Kernan, John Lynch and James Hoey.Templeport Development Association - 1809 Templeport map

The Tithe Applotment Books for 1827 list thirteen tithepayers in the townland.

The 1836 Ordnance Survey Namebooks state- The soil is light yellow clay intermixed with sand stone...The townland is bounded on the W. side by a large lake, on the E. bank of which is situated the parish church. It is a handsome modern building to which is attached a graveyard in which nearly all the Protestant inhabitants are buried. There is an island belonging to this townland near the centre of the lake.

The Port Valuation Office Field books are available for 1839-1840.

Griffith's Valuation of 1857 lists twenty four landholders in the townland.

On 17 March 1943 a Royal Air Force Bristol Beaufighter JL710 crash landed beside the island in Templeport Lough.Beaufighter JL710 Richard Kukura & Tommy Hulme

A distinguished native of the townland is the Roman Catholic Bishop of Ardagh and Clonmacnoise, Francis Duffy (bishop)

== Church of Ireland clergy ==
The list of Anglican rectors of Templeport is viewable at-St Peter's Church Templeport / History-Clergy.

== Port School ==
The Second Report from the Commissioners of Irish Education Inquiry dated 1826 stated that Terence McManus was the headmaster of the school which was a pay school with charges of 10d to 1/3d per annum. The schoolhouse was built of mud at a cost of 5 guineas. There were 77 pupils of which 71 were Roman Catholics and 6 were Church of Ireland. 46 were boys and 31 were girls. It was closed before 1900.

== Census ==
| Year | Population | Males | Females | Total Houses | Uninhabited |
|---|---|---|---|---|---|
| 1841 | 108 | 47 | 61 | 20 | 1 |
| 1851 | 73 | 36 | 37 | 13 | 1 |
| 1861 | 74 | 40 | 34 | 11 | 0 |
| 1871 | 52 | 29 | 23 | 11 | 0 |
| 1881 | 56 | 26 | 30 | 11 | 1 |
| 1891 | 49 | 23 | 26 | 12 | 2 |

In the 1901 census of Ireland, there are fourteen families listed in the townland.

In the 1911 census of Ireland, there are only twelve families listed in the townland.

== Antiquities ==
1. St. Mogue's ruined church on St. Mogue's Island, built about 1500 to replace an earlier church.
2. Templeport Protestant Church erected 1815 to replace an earlier church built about 1400.St Peter's Church of Ireland Church, PORT (E.D. BAWNBOY), County Cavan
3. According to the story The Floating Stone of Inch Island (now found in the 1938 Dúchas Folklore Collection) a cursing stone connected to the birth of Saint Máedóc of Ferns or Mogue on Inch Island was buried in Ray, Templeport townland in the 1880s and is probably still there.
4. Templeport House
5. An earthen ringfort.
6. An earthen ringfort.
7. A crannóg 170 metres from the shore in Templeport Lough.
8. A sandstone Beehive Quern-stone
9. A Foot-Bridge over the stream

== See also ==
- Domhnall ‘Bernach’ Mág Samhradháin
- Francis Duffy (bishop)
