= George Wilkinson =

George Wilkinson may refer to:

- George Wilkinson (music publisher) (1783–1855), English music publisher, and piano and candle manufacturer
- George W. Wilkinson (1810–?), American politician from Iowa
- George Wilkinson (architect) (1814–1880), designer of workhouses and railway stations in Britain and Ireland.
- George Wilkinson (bishop) (1833–1907), Bishop of the Scottish Episcopal Church (Diocese of Saint Andrews, Dunkeld and Dunblane) and Primus
- George Wilkinson (water polo) (1879–1946), British Olympics water polo player
- Sir George Wilkinson, 1st Baronet (1885–1967), Lord Mayor of London 1940–41
- George Alfred Wilkinson (1913–1944), agent of the Special Operations Executive (SOE) and on the roll of honour at the Valençay SOE Memorial
