= Gowlagh North =

Townland in Templeport, Ireland

Gowlagh North (from Irish Gabhlach meaning 'The Fork' [of a mountain stream]) is a townland in the civil parish of Templeport, County Cavan, Ireland. It lies in the Roman Catholic parish of Templeport and barony of Tullyhaw.

== Geography ==
Gowlagh North is bounded on the north by Ballynamaddoo townland, on the west by Killycrin townland, on the south by Killywaum townland and on the east by Corneen townland. Its chief geographical features are Slieve Rushen mountain on whose western slope it lies, forestry plantations, bogs and a dug well. It is called Gowlagh North to distinguish it from Gowlagh South townland with which it has no connection. Gowlagh North is traversed by minor public roads and rural lanes. The townland covers 140 statute acres.

== History ==
The 1609 Baronial Map depicts the townland as a nameless part of Slieve Rushen mountain.

The 1665 Down Survey map depicts it as a nameless part of Slieve Rushen mountain.

The Gowlagh North Valuation Office Field books are available for December 1839.

In 1841, the population of the townland was 61, being 28 males and 33 females. There were eleven houses in the townland, of which one was uninhabited.

In 1851, the population of the townland was 57, being 23 males and 34 females, the reduction being due to the Great Famine (Ireland). There were twelve houses in the townland, of which one was uninhabited.

Griffith's Valuation of 1857 lists nine landholders in the townland.

In 1861, the population of the townland was 52, being 25 males and 27 females. There were ten houses in the townland, of which one was uninhabited.

In 1871, the population of the townland was 54, being 28 males and 26 females. There were nine houses in the townland, and all were inhabited.

In 1881, the population of the townland was 38, being 20 males and 18 females. There were nine houses in the townland, all were inhabited.

In 1891, the population of the townland was 36, being 19 males and 17 females. There were nine houses in the townland, all were inhabited.

In the 1901 census of Ireland, there are eight families listed in the townland.

In the 1911 census of Ireland, there are eight families listed in the townland.
