= Templeport =

Civil parish in County Cavan, Ireland

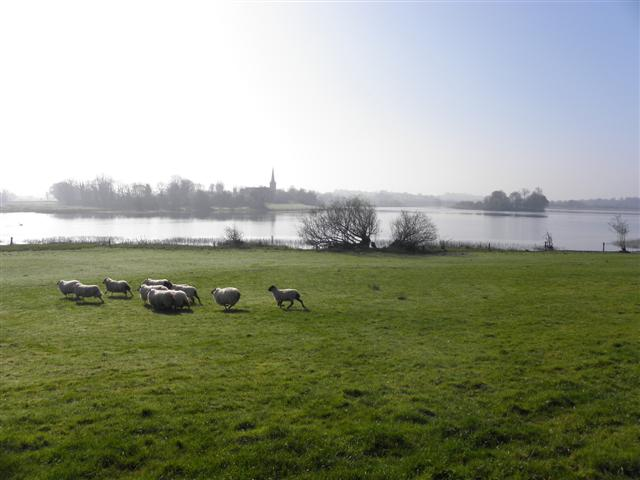
Templeport Lough, County Cavan, Ireland, looking south.

Templeport (Irish: Teampall an Phoirt) is a civil parish in the barony of Tullyhaw, County Cavan, Ireland. The chief towns in the parish are Bawnboy and Ballymagauran. According to Ordnance survey and the Lewis Directory of 1837 the parish of Templeport contains 42,172 statute acres land and lakes. The present Roman Catholic parish of Templeport was formed in 1704, together with the Church of Ireland within the respective Kilmore Diocese. During the 19th centuries Templeport Roman Catholic parish included: Corlough and Glangevlin. Since then new churches were built: St Mogue church Bawnboy (1979) replaced Holy Trinity church Kildoagh (1796-1979) and St Patrick church Kilnavert (1888). The present Templeport St Peter's Church of Ireland, built in 1815, is united with Swanlinbar since 1951.

== Etymology ==
The name of Templeport parish derives from the old medieval Irish name Teampall An Phoirt (meaning "church of the port (or bank or landing-place)") c.1496 AD from the Annals of the Four Masters. The church referred to is the old church on St. Mogue's Island in the middle of Port Lake. This church fell into disuse in medieval times and a new church was built on the opposite shore of the lake. It was forfeited to Queen Elizabeth in 1590 and started use as a Protestant church in about 1610. It is unlikely that the island church ever served as the parish church because there was only one boat available and it would have been extremely inconvenient if not logistically impossible for hundreds of worshipers to go to and from the church in time for mass, especially in rough winter weather. It was built firstly for the convenience of any pilgrim wishing to go to St. Mogue's birthplace and secondly as an interment chapel for the few family members attending burials on the island.

== History ==
The earliest mention of the name in the Vatican archives is for 2 September 1414 which reads:

"To the archdeacon of Kilmore. Mandate to collate and assign to Magonius Macamragan, priest, of the diocese of Kilmore, if found fit, the perpetual vicarage, value not exceeding 6 marks, of Insula Brechungy alias Tempullapuret in the said diocese, collation and provision of which, on its voidance by the death of Andrew Macgamragan, was made to him by bishop Nicholas. He doubts whether the said collation and provision of the said vicarage which, as the pope has learned, is still void as above, holds good. Dignum [arbitramur]".

The earliest mention of the name in the annals of Ireland is in the Annals of the Four Masters for 1496 A.D. This entry states:

"M1496.17- Magauran, i.e. Donnell Bearnagh, Chief of Teallach-Eachdhach, was treacherously slain before the altar of the church of Teampall-an-phuirt, by Teige, the son of Hugh, son of Owen Magauran; and the marks of the blows aimed at him are still visible in the corners of the altar."

Since pre-christian times the noted location of Magh Slécht and the Celtic worship of pagan gods Crom Cruach. Two saints are associated with the parish, Saint Banban the Wise and Saint Mogue.

In medieval times the parish was divided into areas called ballibetoes. The "Survey of County Cavan" held by Sir John Davis on 6 September 1608 (Analecta Hibernica Vol.3, 1931) states that:

"Barony of Lissenouer alias Tullaghehaagh. The temporal lands within this barony are divided into Ballibetoes, each ballibetagh containing a certain number of polls, each poll containing one with another 24 acres of arable land, meadow and pasture. The names of which ballybetoes are-
1. Ballymackgawran containing 18 polls (now Ballymagauran)
2. Ballymackgonghan containing 12 polls (now Bellaleenan)
3. Ballycloinelogh containing 12 polls
4. Ballentulchoe containing 13 polls
5. Balleagheboynagh containing 16 polls
6. Ballygortnekargie containing 11 polls (now Gortnacargy)
7. Ballycooleigie containing 14 polls (now Coologe)
8. Callvagh containing 22 polls (now Tomregan)
9. Aghycloony containing 24 polls (Noclone in Kinawley)
Total polls 143
Total acres 3,432
Value of each poll is 3 Irish shillings per annum."

== Geography ==
The townlands of Templeport civil parish include: Altachullion Upper (Altachullion Upper); Ballymagauran (Ballymagovern); Ballymagirril (Ballymagirl); Ballynamaddoo (Ballinamaddoo); Bawnboy; Bellaleenan; Bofealan; Boley, Templeport; Brackley, Templeport; Burren; Camagh; Carrick East; Cavanaquill; Cloncurkney; Cloneary; Clontycarnaghan (Clintycarnaghan); Coologe (Cooleague); Cor, Templeport; Corboy Glebe; Cornagunleog; Corneen; Corran (Curran, Currin); Corrasmongan; Crossmakelagher (Cross); Derrycassan (Derrycassion); Derrymony (Derrymoney); Derryragh; Drumane; Drumlougher; Erraran; Gortaclogher; Gorteen, Templeport; Gortmore; Gortnaleck; Gortnavreeghan; Gortullaghan; Gowlagh North; Gowlagh South; Greagh; Keenagh, Templeport; Kildoagh; Killycluggin; Killycrin; Killymoriarty; Killynaff; Killyneary; Killyran; Killywaum; Killywillin (Killywilly); Kilnavert (Kilnavart); Kilsallagh; Kilsob; Lakefield, Templeport; Lecharrownahone (Lahernahone); Lissanover (Lisanover); Moherloob; Moherreagh (Moheragh); Muinaghan (Meenaghan); Mullaghlea; Mullaghmore, Templeport; Munlough North; Munlough South; Newtown, Templeport; Owengallees (Owengallis); Port, Templeport; Porturlan; Ray; Rosehill, Templeport; Sralahan or the Common; Sruhagh; Stranadarragh; Toberlyan; Toberlyan Duffin; Tonyhallagh; Tonyrevan; Torrewa; Urhannagh (Urinagh).

== See also ==
- Francis Duffy (bishop)
- Cormac Mác Shamhradháin
- McGovern (name)
- Brian ‘Breaghach’ Mág Samhradháin
- Edmund MacGauran
- James Magauran
