= Bawnboy =

Village in Ulster, Ireland

Bawnboy An Bábhún Buí
- Village
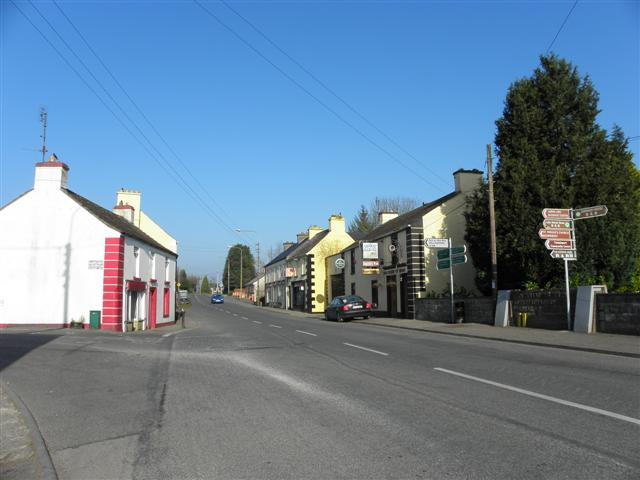
- The N87 passes through Bawnboy

- Location in Ireland
- Coordinates: 54°07′N 7°41′W
- Country: Ireland
- Province: Ulster
- County: Cavan

Bawnboy (Irish: An Bábhún Buí, meaning 'the yellow bawn') is a small village and townland in Templeport Civil Parish, on the N87 road between Ballyconnell and Swanlinbar, in County Cavan, Ireland.

A synod of the Catholic Provincial Council of Armagh was held in the nearby townland of Owengallees, Baunbuidhe (Bawnboy), on 25 May 1669 where The Most Rev. Eugene MacSweeney, Lord Bishop of Kilmore, tried to depose Thomas Fitzsimons, the vicar general of the diocese.

Bawnboy is traditionally part of the ancient parish of Templeport, birthplace of popular saint St Mogue or Maedoc of Ferns around c.558. The most prominent building in the village is the Bawnboy Workhouse, built in 1852 on twelve acres of land in the townland of Corrasmongan. Described as a large post-famine Poor Law Union Workhouse, designed by architect George Wilkinson, was established with a nursing infirmary to house up to 500 poor and destitute persons of the region, ceased being used as a workhouse around the year 1922. Since then the building has been used as a school, arts studio, Foroige and by a local Mens Shed group. At present the building is a semi-derelict Protected Structure, until a decision can be made by Cavan County Council for its sustainable future use. The local Garda station closed in 2013. Over recent years Bawnboy village participates in the national Tidy Towns competition and has shown much improvement with high quality landscaping schemes and a bio-diversity action plan.

== Early history ==
In medieval times the barony of Tullyhaw was divided into economic taxation areas called ballibetoes, from the Irish Baile Biataigh (Anglicized as "Ballybetagh"), meaning 'A Provisioner's Town or Settlement'. The original purpose was to enable the farmer, who controlled the baile, to provide hospitality for those who needed it, such as poor people and travellers. The ballybetagh was further divided into townlands farmed by individual families who paid a tribute or tax to the head of the ballybetagh, who in turn paid a similar tribute to the clan chief. The steward of the ballybetagh would have been the secular equivalent of the erenagh in charge of church lands. There were seven ballibetoes in the parish of Templeport. Bawnboy was located in the ballybetagh of "Balleagheboynagh" (alias "Ballyoghnemoynagh"). The original Irish is Baile Na Muighe Eanach, meaning "The Townland of the Marshy Plain"). The ballybetagh was also called "Aghawenagh", the original Irish is Achadh an Bhuí Eanaigh, meaning "The Field of the Yellow Bog").

== Name ==
Bawnboy takes its name from the term "bawn", the defensive wall surrounding an Irish tower house. It is the anglicised version of the Irish word badhún meaning "cattle-stronghold" or "cattle-enclosure" – its original purpose was to protect cattle during an attack. Described in early records as the Corrasmongan estate, the remains of a late medieval bawn is to be seen at Bawnboy House, which is the origin of the village name. The earliest surviving mention of the placename is in the 1663 Hearth Money Rolls for Templeport where it is called Baonboy. Another name for the village is Kilsub or Kilsob.

The 1622 Survey of County Cavan states:

Sir Richard Greames, holdeth 1000 acres of this land, upon which there is built a Bawne of stone and lyme, sixty foot square and nine foot high, with a little stone house within, where in Lieutenant William Ruttledge dwelleth and hath a lease thereof and of 200 acres of land for 21 yeares and the rest of Sir Richard's 1000 acres are sett to the Irish from yeare to yeare, who plowgh after ye Irish fashion.

The 1665 Down Survey map depicts it as Sir William Parson's Land.

By a deed dated 9 April 1711, the Mannor of Parsonstowne alias Bawneboy was granted, inter alia, to Morley Saunders.

A lease dated 10 December 1774 from William Crookshank to John Enery of Bawnboy includes the lands of Bawnboy.

In 1816 John Bourke held a lease of the townland of Bawnboy from John Enery.

== Historical population ==
In the Hearth Money Rolls compiled on 29 September 1663 there were three taxpayers listed in Baonboy- William Lawther Esq., Stephen Murphy and Patricke Atcheson.

The 1821 census of Ireland states that the population of the village was 189.

The 1831 census of Ireland states that there were 12 houses in the village, all occupied. The population was 60, of which 28 were males and 32 females, so the population had dropped by 129 since 1821. The occupations were 2 female servants, 1 male servant, 1 professional, 4 retailers or craftsmen, 6 agricultural labourers, 4 farmers.

The Bawnboy Valuation Office Field books are available for 1839-1840.

The 1841 census of Ireland states that there were 26 houses in the village, 8 of which were unoccupied. The population was 96, of which 47 were males and 49 females, so the population had increased by 36 since 1831.

== Bawnboy National School ==
The book Bawnboy and Templeport History Heritage Folklore by Chris Maguire gives the following description of the school:

The right to teach in schools was restored to Catholics under the Relief Act of 1772 and from that time onward education progressed in the parish. The second Report from the Commissioners of Irish Education Inquiry 1826 shows that eight schools were operating in the parish of Templeport, including Bawnboy School. They were attended by a total of 670 pupils. All except one of these schools were mud wall cabins and overcrowded. Reading, writing and arithmetic were the main subjects taught. Bawnboy was a pay school held in a temporary room. The headmaster was Charles Brady, a Roman Catholic, who had a salary of £8 per annum. There were 80 pupils of whom 68 were Catholic and 12 Church of Ireland. 47 were boys and 33 were girls. In 1831 a state system of primary education came into being under which the National Education Board was set up. Between 1839 and 1849 Bawnboy was taken over under the National Board at the request of Rev. Philip Magauran P.P. BAWNBOY N.S. was formerly called St. Mogue's and is now named St. Aidan's N.S. It was officially opened on 31st August 1971. Principal Teachers of Bawnboy N.S. : Peter O'Neill (1841-'45); F. Duignan (1845-'49); Thomas Edwards (1849-'78); Thomas McKeon (1878-'91); James Brady (1881-'84); John F. Edwards (1884-'85); Patrick Murphy (1885-'87); Thomas McHugh (1887-'95); Joseph Kenny (1895); John Lynch (1901-'07); Patrick Maguire (1907-'23); Thomas F. O'Grady (1923-'56); Chris Maguire (1956-'82); Ciaran Maguire (1982- ). Assistants : Mrs. Bina McGovern (1916-'47); Máire McGovern (1947-'60); Mrs. Philomena Maguire (1960-'70); Eithne Maguire (1970-'73); Mrs. Marian McGovern (1973-'98); May Glancy (1973- ); Ciaran Maguire (1979-'82); Julianne Breen (1998- ).

The Reports from the Commissioners of National Education in Ireland give the following figures for Bawnboy National School, Roll No. 2927-

1846: One male teacher who received an annual salary of £14. 120 pupils, 81 boys and 39 girls.

1854: One male teacher who received an annual salary of £16-6s-8d. 119 pupils, 71 boys and 48 girls.

1862: John Foley was the headmaster, Anne Foley was the workmistress and Patrick Plunkett was the monitor, all Roman Catholics. There were 195 pupils, all Roman Catholic apart from 17 who were Church of Ireland. The Catechism was taught to the Catholic pupils on Mondays from 3pm to 4pm and on Saturdays from 10am to 12 noon.

1874: The teachers annual salaries amounted to £20. 117 pupils, 57 boys and 60 girls.

1890: There were 89 pupils.

== Events ==
The Bawnboy Festival runs in August for one week, over the duration of the week there are family activities. This includes pastimes such as family skittles and car treasure hunt. One of the more well-known pursuits is the boat trip to St. Mogues Island which runs for two days, usually the Wednesday and Thursday of the week. On the Sunday, there is a village fair. This usually has a vintage car show, jam testing, fancy dress contest and numerous stalls which sell cakes and other objects.

== First Farming Society ==
The earliest Farming Society founded in County Cavan was in Bawnboy in 1800. Sir Charles Coote in his "Statistical Survey of County Cavan", 1801, page 289 writes:

There had not been any farming society in Cavan, at the time I was collecting the materials for this survey; however I now learn, that a society is established at Bawnboy, of which Mr. Sneyd is president, who represents the county. So important are the advantages resulting from the meetings and communications of experimental and judicious farmers, that they should meet every encouragement. No part of Cavan is less engaged in manufacture, than the vicinity of the members of this new society; nor are there any lands so favourably disposed for improvement, if we consider the small rents, and the valuable change, which is wrought on the soil of this hilly region by a small applicationof lime, and a little persevering industry. The encouragement now held out by the Farming Society of Ireland, to the minor establishments, will be doubtless no small incentive to us to cultivate our lands, and bring into immediate profit those valuable resources, which have lain too long neglected, though possessing capabilities enough to procure true wealth and independence.

Coote also says on page 125:

Descending towards Ballyconnell, the prospect improves, where Mr. Sneyd's plantations, at Bawnboy, give the country a warmer and more comfortable appearance, but the roads in this country are terribly bad indeed.

And on page 138:

The plantations are but few; Mr. Sneyd's, of Bawnboy, are contiguous to the small village of the same name, rank foremost amongst those, and his demesne shews a judicious management.

The Mr. Sneyd referred to was Nathaniel Sneyd, a Member of Parliament for County Cavan from 1800 to 1826 and married to a Miss Montgomery of Ballyconnell. The Enery's of Bawnboy were his in-laws.

== Transport ==
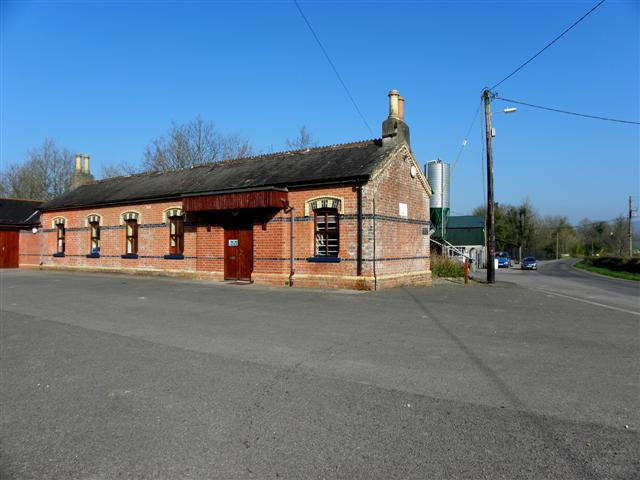
Bawnboy Road railway station buildings

The village is situated on the N87 road and the L1037 road.

Bawnboy Road railway station opened on 24 October 1887 and finally closed on 1 April 1959. It was part of the narrow gauge Cavan and Leitrim Railway.

Leydons Coaches operate route 930 linking the village to Ballyconnell, Belturbet, Cavan, Swanlinbar and Enniskillen. Until mid-October 2012 Bawnboy was served several times daily by Bus Éireann Expressway route 30.

== Notable people ==
- Francis Duffy (born 1958), the Archbishop of Tuam since 2022
- Dave Rudden (born 1988), writer of young adult fiction, Bawnboy native presently based in Dublin

== See also ==
- The Oxburgh Chalice
- List of towns and villages in Ireland
- Loretto Academy (El Paso, Texas) founded by Susan Carty of Bawnboy, later known as Mother Praxedes.
