= N87 road (Ireland) =

Road in Ireland

N87 road
- Bóthar N87
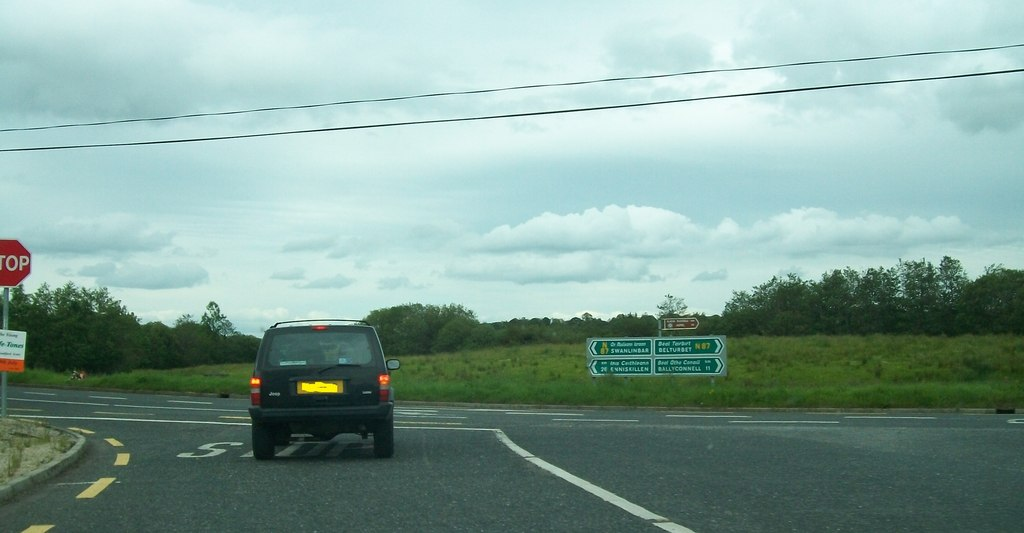
- Joining from R202 at Derrynacreeve

Route information
- Length: 28.136 km (17.483 mi)

Location
- Country: Ireland
- Primary destinations: County Fermanagh; Enniskillen; County Cavan; Swanlinbar; Ballyconnell; Bawnboy; Belturbet

Highway system
- Roads in Ireland; Motorways; Primary; Secondary; Regional
← N86	→ R101

The N87 road is a national secondary road in the north of County Cavan, Ireland.

== Route ==
The route leaves the N3 at Belturbet and passes through the towns of Ballyconnell and Swanlinbar in north County Cavan before crossing the border with County Fermanagh in Northern Ireland where it becomes the A32 and continues to Enniskillen and Omagh.

The N87 road is part of the through route from Enniskillen via Swanlinbar and the R202 via Mohill to Dromod connecting with the N4 (Sligo to Dublin) road to Dublin.

== See also ==
- Roads in Ireland
- Motorways in Ireland
- National primary road
- Regional road
