= Erenagh =

Medieval Irish parish officer

The medieval Irish office of erenagh (Old Irish: airchinnech, Modern Irish: airchinneach, Latin: princeps) was responsible for receiving parish revenue from tithes and rents, building and maintaining church property and overseeing the termonn lands that generated parish income. Thus he had a prebendary role. The erenagh originally had a tonsure, but took no other holy orders; he had a voice in the Chapter when they consulted about revenues, paid a yearly rent to the Bishop and a fine on the marriage of each daughter. The role usually passed down from generation to generation within specific families in each parish. After the Reformation and the Dissolution of the Monasteries the role of erenagh became subsumed in the responsibilities of the parson in each parish.

== Surname ==
The common surname McInerney is derived from the Irish, Mac an Airchinnigh (son of the erenagh). As may be supposed, this surname arose in various areas in Ireland leading to numerous unrelated bearers of the name. The most prominent group of the family were associated with County Clare since at least the late 13th century when they were first recorded and are still numerous there. This sept was subordinate to the McNamaras and it was from them that the family originally derived. The McInerneys in County Clare were based in the Barony of Lower Bunratty on their ancestral estates in and around the present day townlands of Ballysallagh, Ballynacragga and Dromoland (parish of Kilnasoolagh). Members of the family held property there until Cromwell's confiscations of the 1650s, whereby several members of the family were transplanted to other areas of the County, in part due to their involvement in the 1641 rebellion. The name is numerous in County Clare, Limerick and Dublin, and in the United States, Canada, Australia, England and New Zealand.

== Townland ==
The townland of Erenagh, historically referred to as "Erynach," is noted in medieval records linked to Furness Abbey in Lancashire, England. According to the Monasticon Anglicanum, Niall Mac Dunlevi, King of Ulster, founded an abbey there in 1127 near St. Finian’s Well, known as the Abbey of Carryke or Carrig. This was the first abbey in Ireland of a Roman-recognized order after 1111, likely established through arrangements made by St. Malachy with the Savigniac community at Tulketh. The monks arrived that same year, though their origin is unclear. In 1147, the abbey joined the Cistercian Order as a daughter house of Furness. Its first abbot, Evodius, predicted its destruction, which occurred in 1177 under John de Courcy, who later founded Inch Abbey as restitution. Locally called Templenageerah, or “church of the sheep,” the name Erenagh likely derives from An Oireanach, meaning “the cultivated place.”
