= Sruhagh =

Townland in County Cavan, Ireland

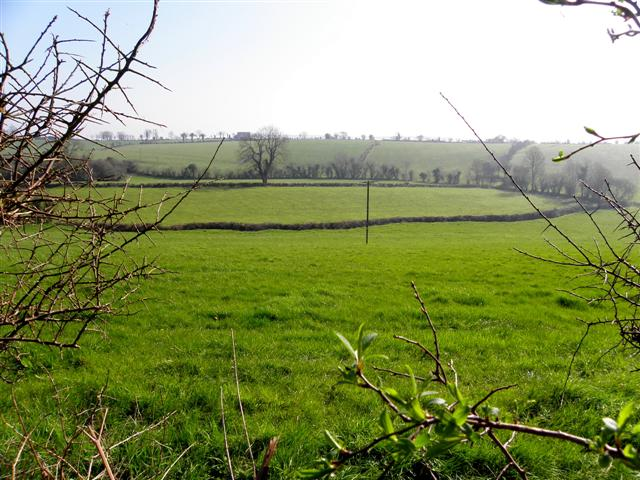
Sruhagh townland, Templeport, County Cavan, looking eastwards.

Sruhagh (from Irish Sruth meaning 'A river') is a townland in the civil parish of Templeport, County Cavan, Ireland. It lies in the Roman Catholic parish of Templeport and barony of Tullyhaw.

== Geography ==
Sruhagh is bounded on the north by Derryragh and Gorteen, Templeport townlands, on the west by Ballymagauran townland and by Woodford Demesne townland in County Leitrim, on the south by Derryniggin townland in County Leitrim and on the east by Derrycassan townland. Its chief geographical features are Ballymagauran Lough, Derrycassan Lough, the Shannon–Erne Waterway and forestry plantations. Sruhagh is traversed by a public road and several rural lanes. The townland covers 325 statute acres.

== Etymology ==
The earliest known name of the Shannon–Erne Waterway was the River Gráinne (Sruth Gráinne in Irish). Sruhagh townland lies on the north shore of that part of the river which connects Ballymagauran and Derrycassan lakes and it derives its name from that situation. The earliest surviving mention of the townland name is in a poem (Poem 2, verse 29) composed about 1291 A.D. in the Book of Magauran which gives the name as Sruth Gráinne-

The Gráinne River, that clear and fairest of streams,

never ceases its moaning as it flows through the wood.

Sruth Gráinne ar a ghuth ní ghabh

Sruth glan áille tre fhiodh.

== History ==
In medieval times the McGovern barony of Tullyhaw was divided into economic taxation areas called ballibetoes, from the Irish Baile Biataigh (Anglicized as 'Ballybetagh'), meaning 'A Provisioner's Town or Settlement'. The original purpose was to enable the farmer, who controlled the baile, to provide hospitality for those who needed it, such as poor people and travellers. The ballybetagh was further divided into townlands farmed by individual families who paid a tribute or tax to the head of the ballybetagh, who in turn paid a similar tribute to the clan chief. The steward of the ballybetagh would have been the secular equivalent of the erenagh in charge of church lands. There were seven ballibetoes in the parish of Templeport. Sruhagh was located in the ballybetagh of Ballymagauran. The historical spellings of the ballybetagh are Ballymackgawran & Ballimacgawran (Irish = Baile Mhic Shamhráin = McGovern's Town).

The townland also appears in an interesting list of the rents due to the McGovern Chief, Maghnus 'Ruadh' Mág Samhradháin about 1400 A.D. It reads as follows-

This is the portion of Sruagh- 18 kegs of butter and 50 measures of milk and a band of butter every Sunday from Mayday to Michaelmas and 3 portions of raw meat each year and a gallon of butter in summertime and 8 cakes each year.

From this list we see that in 1400 the main type of farming carried on in Sruhagh was milk and beef cattle together with oats.

The 1609 Baronial Map depicts the townland as Shroghagh. The 1652 Commonwealth Survey spells the name as Sroohagh. The 1665 Down Survey map depicts it as Shreagh. William Petty's 1685 map depicts it as Shreagh.

In the Plantation of Ulster by grant dated 29 April 1611, along with other lands, King James I granted the two polls of Sroogagh to the McGovern Chief, Feidhlimidh Mág Samhradháin. The townland had been part of the McGovern chief's personal demesne for several hundred years before this and it was just a Surrender and regrant confirming the existing title to the then chief. This is confirmed in a visitation by George Carew, 1st Earl of Totnes in autumn 1611 when he states that Magauran had his own land given him on this division.

An Inquisition of King Charles I held in Cavan town on 4 October 1626 stated that the aforesaid Phelim Magawrane died on 20 January 1622 and his lands including two polls of Shroughagh went to his son, the McGovern chief Brian Magauran who was aged 30 (born 1592) and married.

The McGovern lands in Sruhagh were confiscated in the Cromwellian Act for the Settlement of Ireland 1652 and were distributed as follows-

The 1652 Commonwealth Survey lists the proprietor as John King & others.

In the Hearth Money Rolls compiled on 29 September 1663 there were two people paying the Hearth Tax in Sruanagh- Hugh Oge O Multully and Hugh Relly. O'Multully had two hearths which indicated a larger house than the rest in the townland.

A grant dated 30 January 1668 from King Charles II to John Davies included the two cartrons of Shreagh containing 37 acres at an annual rent of £2-5-11.

A grant dated 7 July 1669 from King Charles II to John, Lord Viscount Massareene included 20 acres in Shreagh.

The 1790 Cavan Carvaghs list spells the name as Sruagh.

Ambrose Leet's 1814 Directory spells the name as Sragh.

The Tithe Applotment Books for 1827 (which spell the name as Shrough) list fifteen tithepayers in the townland.

The Sruhagh Valuation Office Field books are available for 1839–1841.

Griffith's Valuation of 1857 lists twelve landholders in the townland.

== Census ==
| Year | Population | Males | Females | Total Houses | Uninhabited |
|---|---|---|---|---|---|
| 1841 | 49 | 22 | 27 | 8 | 0 |
| 1851 | 46 | 24 | 22 | 7 | 0 |
| 1861 | 42 | 24 | 18 | 7 | 0 |
| 1871 | 28 | 11 | 17 | 7 | 0 |
| 1881 | 27 | 12 | 15 | 7 | 0 |
| 1891 | 29 | 14 | 15 | 6 | 0 |

In the 1901 census of Ireland, there are nine families listed in the townland.

In the 1911 census of Ireland, there are eight families listed in the townland.

== Antiquities ==
1. An earthen ringfort.
2. A crannóg in Ballymagauran Lough, 190 metres from the Sruhagh shore.
3. Crom Cruagh's garden
4. A late Bronze Age bronze Class 2 scabbard chape was found in Sruhagh and is now in the National Museum of Ireland (reference No. 1580)
