= Charles Magauran =

Irish chief of the McGovern Clan of Tullyhaw

Charles Magauran, the Third, (Gaelic- Cathal Mág Samhradháin) was chief of the McGovern Clan and Baron or Lord of Tullyhaw barony, County Cavan including the period 1641 to 1657.

== Ancestry ==
His ancestry was Charles son of Brian Magauran son of Feidhlimidh Mág Samhradháin (d. 1622) son of Brian son of Tomás (d. 1532) son of Maghnus (d. 1497) son of Tomás Óg (d. 1494) son of Tomás na Feasoige (d. 1458) son of Fearghal (d. 1393) son of Tomás (d. 1343) son of Brian ‘Breaghach’ Mág Samhradháin (d. 1298). His father Brian Magauran was his predecessor as chief of the clan. Cathal was the eldest son and his younger brothers were Domhnall (anglicised Daniel) Magauran and Feidhlimidh (anglicised Phelim) Magauran.

== Chieftainship ==
On the death of the McGovern chief, his father Brian Magauran, some time after 1628, Charles took the chieftaincy and lived in Ballymagauran Castle.

== 1641 Rebellion ==
Charles joined the Irish Rebellion of 1641 against British rule and he led the McGovern forces in the wars that followed.

The surviving British settlers later made depositions about the rebels’ activities, some of which mentioned Charles and the other McGoverns.

=== County Cavan depositions ===
William Reynolds of Lisnaore made a deposition about the rebellion in Lissanover as follows:

folio 260r William Reinoldes of Lisnaore in the parrish of Templeport in the County of Cavan gent sworne & examined deposeth and sajth That about the beginning of the presente Rebellion this deponent was deprived robbed or otherwise dispoiled & Lost by the Rebells: his meanes goodes & chattells concisting of horses mares beasts Cattle Corne hay howsholdstuff implements of husbandry apparell bookes provition silver spoones swyne & the benefite of his howse and six Poles of Land: due debts & other thinges of the value of three hundredth Sixtie fowre Powndes nine shillings sterling. And further sajth That the Rebells that soe robbed & dispojled him of his personall estate are theis that follow vizt Gillernew Mc Gawren & Hugh mc Manus oge mc Gawren both of the Parrish and County of Cavan aforesaid Turlaghe o Rely Brian Groome mc Gowren Daniell mc Gawren & Charles mc Gawren all of the place aforesaid gent: with divers other Rebells whose names he cannott expresse to the number of 30 or thereabouts And further sajth that theis 4 parties next after named (being duly indebted to this deponent) are or lately were in actuall Rebellion & carry armes with for & amongst the Rebells against his Maiesty and his loyall Subjects vizt ffarrell mc Gawren of the parish of Killiney & County aforesaid gent Cornelius ô Sheriden of in the County of ffermanagh gent, William Greames & Phelim mc Gowren both of Templeporte aforesaid gentlemen: And alsoe saith that the parties hereafter mencioned are or lately were alsoe actors in the same present Rebellion & carried armes & did take parts & assist the Rebells vizt ffarrell Broome mc Kallaghan of the Parrish of Templeport Wanderer: whoe as this deponent hath beene credibly tould murthered this deponents owne mother) Phillipp mc Hugh mc Shane o Rely of Ballinecargie in the County of Cavan Esquire now a Colonell of Rebells Capt Myles o Rely his brother Edmund Mc Mulmore o Rely of or nere Ballirely gent & Myles his sonn whoe when the Rebellion began was high sherriff of the said County of Cavan Phillip mc Mulmore o Rely of Ballytrusse Esquire John ô Rely his sonne & heire Sergeant Maio{r} Hugh Boy o Rely, Connor o Rely of Agheraskilly gent, Edmund mc Kernon of the Parrish of Kildallon gent & Edmund his sonn, & William another of his sons; William Greames of Templeport gentleman Owney Sheredin of the parrish of Kilmore gent, Andrew Mc Gowran of Templeport ffarrell mc Acorby of the same & James Brady of the same parrish gent; Cohonaghe Maguire of Aghloone gent Manus ô Mulmoghery of Aghloone aforesaid yeoman Turlogh mc Brian of Vrhoonoghe yeoman: Shane mc Brian of Killsallough, a popish Priest; ffarrell mc Adeggin of Aghavanny yeoman Owen Mc Adeggan of the same & Daniell mc Gowran of Gortneleck gent & Edmund his sonn: & divers others whose names & places of aboad he cannott Remember William Reynolds Jur 6o Apr 1643.

George Butterwick of Drumlane parish stated:

George Butterwyke of the parish of dromelan and Barrony of Lofte within the County of Cavant a brittish Protestant being dewly sworne deposeth That on or about the 24th of October 1641... And saith that Charles Megowran and Galeece Megowran and many other of the magowrans their kindred and frends of Tullohaw and many of their tennant{s} and servants and their neyghbors did fett and driu{e} away my Cattell and beate my tennants for that they did offer to hinder them for dryuing away my Cattell.The said megowrans after that they had sent away my Cattell did come backe to my howse and take away most of my goods and did threaten my wife that <they> would knocke her on in the head Iff she would not gyue them her monies and had done so but that my man being an Irishman did intreat for her and sayd that he knew that his master had not receiued his rent as yett and that money was very scarce with him and for the Corne and hay and turffe and garden stuff on Daniell a Rely Clayming of that to be his right did entre on the howse and land and all the <goods> as his right that were there left, And soe he Lost his lease worth by the yeare in all being 5 poles 60 pounds a yeare for which he payed £27 a yeare to his damage of. <And he> Lost the aparrell of himselfe my wife and two Children had and all which his servant had whose name was Elizabeth Church being 69 yeares old at the least who being stript was not able to follow vs for the the [sic] weather was very Cold both with frost and Snow and the fyrst night we gate neyther bread meate nor drincke but only a few Cabbadge leaues and hay and an old howse to lodge in and water to drinck which was Cold Comfort to vs being almost naked but only some small peeices of rugs which some of th{e} Irysh gaue to hide our naked nes the Irish came that nig{ht} about twelue of the Clock and threat[e]ned vs to kill vs or to fyre the howse over our heads yf we did not gyue them some moneys but where god knowes we had none for them my old mayde did surely dye by the for we neve{r} heard of her since. Att length the deponent mett with a frend twelue myles from dublynn so that from thence we ridd to Dublynn but from that tyme vntill a month afterward we Could <not> be sound of our feete and for our bodies we are not sound as yett Theise Rebells Phillip A Rely manus mac Shane with the rest of the Relyes did promise when all the pari{sh} of dromlane & of the the [sic] towne of Turbat and all the English betweene Turbatt and cavant came away that they would send with them with a Convoy to the next countie and tooke what goods we Could Carry about vs we might take away some gott lyberty to goe with horses and carrs to Carry old folke and Children Howbeit befor{e} we gonn 9 myles we might see and Army of men Coming agaynst vs and then sayd the Convoys that vnlesse we would gyue them more monies they woul{d} not hinder those men we having gyven them monies in the moring but theise Armed men came vppon vs and the convoys helpe them and some of vs they kild outwright and dyuers mayned of vs he veryly beleeueth of old folke and Children there died almost a hundred but there were of the English when they the Rebells begynn to Stripp about two thowsand or more at the least of men woemen and Children that were stripped.

Thomas Hedges of Cavan Town stated:

Thomas Hedges of the towne & County of Cavan gent duely sworne sayth That on or about the 24th day of October last past he was robbed and dispoyled of his lands goods and Cattell of the valew following (vizt) Corne worth Thirty pounds Threescore & ffour horses & mares worth Two hundred & fforty pounds fforty & Six Cowes worth Nynty pounds ster. One hundred & odd sheepe worth Threescore pounds. Leases worth Twoe hundred and ffifty pounds Hay worth Ten pounds Houeshold goods worth ffifty pounds wooll worth Ten pounds, money which was taken as Thirteene pounds debts owing Twelue pounds Ten shillings In all amounting to Seaven hundred Threescore and ffive pounds Ten shillings ster. And after all this the said Hedges his wife & 8 children were most shamefully & barbarously stript to the very skins as they come by the way and exposed to such hunger & Cold that two of his said children dyed thereby & the rest are not yet well. And all this was by the meanes of Phillip mc Hugh mc Shane Rely of Ballingeargy Castle in Com Cavan & his followers And that The names of the rest of the Rebells which were followers of Phillip mc Hugh mc Shane and robbed this examinant are these....Charles Magauran of Tullahagh.

Martin Kilhare of Drumlane made depositions about the rebellion in Munlough South and Drumlane:

Martine Killhare of Drumlane in the Countie of Cauan doe depose that my Brother Godferrye Killhare of Munlogh within the parish of Templeporte within the Baronie of Tullahae and Countie of Cauan, had in personale estate when this Rebellione first begane- Cowes ould and younge woorth £64; Horses woorth £20; Corne and haye worth £10; Houshould goods £10; In all £104. All these goods ware taken from him forceably aboute the 24th of October 1641 by the hands of Gillernew mc Gawran, and Manus mc Gawran, both of the parish of Templeport and Baronie of Tullaha and Countie of Cauan gent. Donnell Ogge mc Gawran of the same gent[leman], Brian Ogge Mc Gawran of the same gent., Brian Ogge Mc Gawran of the same gent, and their followers. And further he cannot depose Signum [mark] predicti Martini 13 Jan: 1641 Jur coram nobis 30 Jan: 1641 Roger Puttocke Will: Hitchcock. Martine Killhare of the parish of Drumlane and Baronie of Loghte and Countie of Cauan, doth depose, that his mother Elizabeth Killhare and he had in personale estate when this Rebellione first begane Cowes ould and younge worth £122-10s-0d; horses and maires worth £45-10s-0d; sheepe worth £10; A Lease of 3 pooles of land within Sir Edward Bagshaws Proportione £80. Corne and haye £50. houshould goods £50. A bond of three pounds due at all Saints last. In all £331. <And that> All these goods ware taken from them forceibly aboute the 24th of October 1641 by the hands of Gillernew mc Gawran and Manus mc Gaweran of the parish of Temple porte, and Baronie of Tullahae and Countie of Cauan gent, Donell oge McGawran of the half Barrony of Tullehae gent Charles mc Goran of the same gentleman & about 200 more of their followers rebells, whoe quite robbed and dispoiled this deponents & mother and himself of the same goods.

Dorothy Ward of Drumlane stated:

Dorothy Ward in the absence of her husband John Ward of the parish of Drumlane & Countie of Cavan yeoman (now Garrison’d at Bellamount) deposeth that her sayd husband John Ward hath lost in ffree land by occasion of the Rebellion two hundred pounds; Twentie milch Cowes fiftie pounds; fiue and twentie drie Cattell worth thirtie pounds; fiue horses worth seauenteene pounds; fiue hogges worth thirtie shillinges, his bees and garden seauen pounds; his haggard of Corne and heay worth twentie two pounds; in readie monie sixt pounds; houshould Goods thirtie pounds; Eleauen pound debte owing him by one Martin Baxter of the same Countie and parish of Kildallen; fiftie four shillings by one Musgraue Arinton of the same place, And the parties Rebells that robbed him were Charles mc Gowran of Tolloghaghe in the County of Cavan gent. Shane ô Rely of Cartecall in the same County yeoman: Shane Mulmore o Rely in the parrish of Drumlane & same Countyyeo gentleman & many others to the number of 40: And expelled him his wife & 2 children from there howse: And 8 myles further after their comeing from home and after that the Rebell Phillip mc Hugh mc Shane ô Rely had promissed saffe conduct: Hee and hissouldjers stripped them and their children of all their clothes & the ready money they had which came to x li. or thereabouts more & turned them away naked for Dublin & 700 or 800 more protestants in their company And after there comeing to Dublin the children being exposed to could and want dyed & the deponent & his wife have noe meanes Left.

Arthur Culme of Cloughoughter Castle stated, inter alia:

Arthur Cul[me] of Cloughvter in the County of Cavan Esq[uire] duelie sworne And examyned deposeth ... And he sawe Charles mac Gawran beare Armes and hee was at the Castel severall times when I was with seveall Rebeles attending him; And I hee hath bine Crediblie informed that hee the said Charles mac Gawran [Do]nil mac Gawran, Phelim mac Gawran Gilderan [mac] Gawran; And the most of that sept: are notor[ious rebeles] they live in the halfe Barrony of Tallahagh [and Countie] of Cavan I have bine likewise Credibelie [informed that] Mr James Talbot of BalleConnillin the [Countie of Ca]van is And {hath} bine A most notorious Cunning Rebel.

Robert Simmons of Killeshandra stated:

Robert Simons of the parish of Killyshandra in the Barony of Tallaghknogher and County of Cavan yeoman being duly sworne deposeth and saith, That since the beginning of the present rebellion and by meanes thereof he this deponent at seuerall times was expelled from deprived robbed or otherwise dispoyled of his goods and chattells of the values hereafter expressed vizt of 116 Cowes and Oxen worth 230 li. 49 young heifers and bullocks worth 62 li. 90 sheepe worth 30 li. 26 horses and Mares worth 80 li. Corne and hay in the haggard worth 50 li. Corne in the ground worth 15 li. housholdstuffe worth 15 li. In all amounting to 482 li And further saith that he hath lost by this rebellion the benefitt of the lease of his farme wherein <he hath an estate for eleaven {yea}res to come his Interest wherein he valued before the rebellion at lx li.> All which were taken away by or by the meanes of Charles Magowran of the halfe barony of Tullaghan <a> in the County of Cavan gent ffarrall mc Call ô Rely of the parish of Killyshandra in the same Countie gent Owen mc Shane ô Rourk of the parish of Killgallerin in the County of Leytrym Esquire Dermott mc Alay in the same County gent and ffarrall oge ô Rely of in the County of Longford gent with divers others theire Complices and confederats whose names and places of aboad this deponent Knoweth not And further saith that there are owing vnto him seuerall debts and summes of money by seuerall men now in actuall rebellion (which he deemeth to be vtterly lost) The names of which persons and the summes by them due are as followeth vizt Owen mc Tirlagh ô Rely xxxviij li. Laughlin mc Tirlagh ô Rely xxx s. James Oge ô Sheridan xvj s. ffarrall mc Cohonnogh mc Kernan xxvj s. Knogher mc Aboe xx s. In the whole xlij li. xij s. And that there are other debts and summes of money due vnto him this deponent by men stript and robbd by the rebells and therby disinabled to make satisfaccion amounting to xxxij li. xv s. which sommes he also deemeth to be lost So as the totall sum m e s of all this deponents losses doth amount vnto the summe of six hundred and seaventeene pounds seaven shillings The names of which persons and the su m mes by them owing are also as follo weth vizt Patricke Atkinson iij [ ] [ ] killcragg xxvj s. Richa rd Hart viij li. Jeffrey Troigg iiij li. John mc Vity xiiij s. walter Johns t on ix s. Adam Johns t on iij li. John Anderson vj li. And this deponent further saith that he hath heard itt credibly reported that the rebells vpon the taking away of his goods said that they had more right to them then he and that this deponent and the rest of the English, had inhabited this Kingdome long enough and it was now high time for them (meaneing the Irish) to recover and repossesse theire owne And that the said Rebells first, said that they had the Kings warrant and afterwards the queenes warrant for what they did Otherwise said they men might well thinke they never would have risen in that manner and haue done as they did.

James Gardiner of Aghabane stated:

James Gardiner late of Taghabane in the parrish of Kildallan in the County of Cavan gent sworne and examjned sayth That in the beginning of the present Rebellion Hee this deponent at Taghabane aforesaid and alsoe at Correnery in the Parrish of Killasandra & County of Cavan was deprived robbed or otherwise dispoyled of his goodes & chattells consisting of horses Mares a Coult beasts Cattle sheepe corne Malt howsholdgoods provition His stock in his tannhowse in Killisandra & of the possession Rents and proffitts of 2 farmes All of the value & to his present losse of ffive hundred & twenty powndes ster And this deponent is like to be deprived of, and loose the future proffits of his said farmes (worth £20 per annum) vntill a peace bee established: And further saith That the persons that soe deprived & dispojled him of his said goods were actors in the present Rebelljon and are named as followeth vizt Connor ô Rely of Aghroskilly in the same County gentleman John mcMulmore Rely of Killicrannah in the same County gent Gillernew McGaverran of Talloghagh gente and Charles Mc Gaverran of the same gent Keire ô Rourke of in the County of Leitrim gent Myles ô Rely then high sherriff of the said County of Cavan Ferrall mc Call ô Rely of Cashell in the same County of Cavan gent, & divers others whose names she hee knows not, being their souldjers Complicees and assistants.

Audrey Carrington of Ballyness, Bofealan townland stated:

Awdrey Carington of the Relict of Thomas Carington late of Ballenesse in the County of Cavan sworne and examined deposeth and saith That in the very beginning of the present Rebellion within the County aforesaid shee this deponent and her said husband (whoe was then alyve) were expelled and driven from their howse & farme of Ballenesse aforesaid, and robbed and deprived of Cowes yong Cattle Mares howsholdgoods ready money and other goods and chattells of the value & to their losse of £101 or thereabouts By the Rebells Charles Magowran of Bally Magowran in the said County gent & divers others of that name & others his complicees confederates and souldjers whom shee cannott nominate, And at the same tyme they were att Droughill in the same County robbed & deprived of a Quantety of Oats worths £6. By the Rebell Phillip mc Shane ô Rely of, or nere, Kilmore in the County of Cavan (whoe then forceibly entered vpon the land of Drowghill belonging to Sir Edward Bagshaw knighte & possesseth the same) and by his partakers & souldjers whose names she cannott expresse, And sayth that by the perswasion of the said Charles Magowran, her said husband (being a weaver, was perswaded to goe back againe & stay with her this deponent his wife & 7 Children & work vpon his trade of a weaver; And vpon faire promisses to haue some of their goodes restored they all stayd & he worked vpon his trade at Bellenesse aforesaid for the Rebells, whoe would neuer pay any thinge Considerably for their work Soe as they were forced to remove to Belturbett; from thence the Rebells would not suffer them to come away but they all were restrained there for above a yere: During which tyme of their stay in that County the Rebells at Belturbett (as this deponent was credibly told) & verely beleeveth drowned at Beltubett bridge, about fifty protestants, and hanged one Mr Carr, & one Tymothy Dickinson And the deponent and her husband (though staid and restrained there becawse of his trade) yet they were still in feare & danger of their Lives: lookeing every day when the Rebells would either fetch them away to Drowne, or murther them Howsoever it pleased god to preserve their liues yet they lived in great want, and her husband about November 1642 died att Belturbett aforesaid, Leaveing her this deponent & children to the mercy of the Rebells; whoe at the length suffered them to come away from Belturbett aforesaid, but before they came to Cavan certeine Stragling vnknowne rebells robbed the deponent of what meate & provision she hadd, And afterwards when they were comen out of the County of Cavan divers other stragling Rebells whome she knew not robbed her, the deponent & her children of such apparell and things as they carried, saveing some clothes on their backs, and they stript one woman in their company stark naked, whoe had a child in her Armes, and in deed they lefte nothing with any one of the deponents company (that were about 140 persons) that was worth takeing away: Howbeit with much difficulty she & the rest escaped with liffe to the English Army. She further saith That after the drowneing of the people at Belturbett. It was a Common report amongst the very Irish themselves thereabouts that none durst come vnto nor stay at the bridge of Belturbett, becawse some spiritt or ghost came often thither & cryed Reveng Reveng: Shee further saith that the Rebells at Belturbett kept their feast of Ester next following the beginning of the Rebellion, vpon Palmsunday & the daies following which was a iust weeke before our feast of Ester, And on that which they then kept for Ester day, The Rebell Owen Brady then a Com[m]ander there & the rest of the Rebells as they came from Masse, sett fyre on, and burned the most part of the towne of Belturbett aforesaid together with the Church there which was a goodly faire building.

=== County Leitrim depositions ===
Ralph Carr of Oughteragh parish stated:

Raphe Carr of Clenlorgie in the parrish of outrach and County of Leathrum Glover and now a souldier in his maiesties service in Dublin an English prodestant aged 28 yeares or thereabouts being duly sworn deposeth that since the Rebellion began he was Robed and disposessed of a Cartron of land Clenloigy hold from my Lord Parsons for 17 yeares full stock with Inglish Cattell to the valew of four score pound besides a fine and building for my land £12. in horses and mares £10. in Corne and hay fourteene pound in houshould goods brasse and pewter and provision forty pound in money twenty-three pound in all the some of seaven score and nineteene pound (£159) and nothing to maynetaine my wife and four children and aprentice wench which was good as naked but by my pay on the 20th of october the same was taken by Charles mcGouran of Tullalia in County Cavan a frehoulder and his followers which was owen GilliCrest's sone, Teig Gilly Christ near Tullalia and teige mcmartins near Tullalia people and when I was dispossed of all my goods, I mett with Charles mcGouran riding with his sword drawne and Phelim mc Gouran and one Grimes and askt them what athoryty they had for taken away my goods the sayd they sayd hadd the kings broade seale but they sayd they would not show it but they sayd that we (meaning the English) must all goe to our Country and they must keepe theirs for it was the Kings pleasure thorow Ireland and I wisht them to take heede what they did for I thought they did more then they could answere they bad me hould my toung and sayd I was tow sausy tow examine them and bad me goe my wayes for feare of worse harme.

The aforesaid Ralph Carr made a further statement:

Raph Carr of Clenlorgin in the County of Leitrim Glover sworne & examined deposeth and saith That since the beginning of the presente Rebellion and by meanes thereof James Carr late of the Parrish of Drumlane in the Countie of Cavan gent this deponents father. was depriued robbed or otherwise dispojled of his meanes goods and Chattells of the value following vizt, of Cattle worth £108; of Mares worth £10; Corne and hay worth £20; howshold goods and apparrell worth £30; Ready mony £4; th interest of a leas of Drumbarly worth £10; amounting in all to the summe of one hundreth fowrscore and twoe powndes ster by the Rebells Charles McGowran Phelim McGowran Gillernow McGowran & others their souldjers to the number of 2 or 300 at the be whose names he cannott expresse & saith that the Rebells aforesaid afterwards hanged this afterwards one Donnell o Rely of the same parish & his Confederates vnder the Comand of Phillip mcHughe ô Rely Colonell, hanged vp to death this deponents said father & one Timothy Dickinson And drowned this deponents mother & thirtie seven more men women and Children protestants in the River of Beturbett, throwing them over the bridg there. as this deponent hath beene credibly informed by William Blo cksom Blocksome, John Hickman, Nicholas Wilkinson Thomas Partridge & others of Belturbett that saw the wickednes done & this deponent verely beleeveth, & hath too much cawse to assure himself that their Report is true: But the deponent comeing away in the beginning of the Rebellion & before theis Murthers were Committed cannott speake to the same nor to any other cruelties traiterous words or other thinges Comitted [spoken] or done by the Rebells before since he came out of that Cuntrie of his owne Knowledg.

Thomas Lewis of Oughteragh parish stated:

Thomas Lewes of Kilanshele in the parish of Cotterah within the Baronie of Cargallan and Countie of Letrime being duly sworne doth depose that I had in personale estate, when That since this Rebellione first began he was deprived & robbed his goodes & Chattells following vizt- Leases woorth £80; Cowes and steeres and heffers and horses and mares worth £112; Corne and haye £36; In debts due to me £44-18s-0d; In houshold goods worth £50; In all amounting £322-18s-4d. Besids a bond of my Lord Parsons which was fiue hundred pounds left in my Costodie for moneys and security due to his Lordship. All which goods chattells & bond ware taken from me by Charles mcGawran, Gillernew mcGowran and Donile ogge mcGawran and Willyam Grimes and Bryane mcCornan O'Rurk's wiffe, all of the parish of Temple port and Baronie of Tullehane and Countie of Cauan and Brian o Rourk & his wiffe of the parrish of otraghie and County of Leitrim aboute the 25 of October 1641: which persons when thay pressed by violence into my howse, I demanded by what authoritie thay did soe they answared me that it was not a time for me to question authoritie nowe And aboute the 18 of 8ber 1641 one Turlah McPhelim McJeffry O Rourke of Liscollpheale of the parish of Outrah and County of Letrim said to this deponent, that the King had given vnto one O Rourk a prisoner beyond seas the whole County of Letrim, and if they could not gett the Barony County, they would try hard for the Barony. And farther deposeth that aboute the time that this deponent was robbed there were 296 persons more dwelling in the said parish and within a mile or therabouts therof that were robbed of all their goods likewise.

Nicholas Ward of Ballinamore stated:

Nicholas Ward of Ballenemoore in the parish of Owtragh in the parish of Barrony of Carregallon in the County of latrim yeoman: Aged threescore yeares or thereabouts being duely sworne deposeth that he was Robed of & lost since the present Rebellion began That is to saie the five & twentieth day of October last about tenn of the Clock in the forenoone att Ballanemoore aforesaid all his goods of the vallues followeing (vizt) in Cattle worth six pounds, in household goods, provition for the house & other goods worth one hundreth pounds in hay worth six pounds, in all amounting to the some of One hundreth & twelue pounds By Charles mcGowran of the Barrony of Tallehay & County of Cavan gent: william Greaham of the same gent, Charles ô Rorke of the said parish of Owtragh gent Phelim ô Rorke of the same gent: Teige oge ô Rorke of the same gent: Brian ô Rorke of the same gent: Coagh ô Rorke of the same gent: Ternan McTreor of the same Irish preist & diuerse other Irish Rebells that was in Rebellion & in company with them to the Number of two hundreth or thereabouts. And further deposeth that the said Charles ô Rorke said that the Castle of Dublin was taken And that they had the kings broad seale to take all the English mens goods & send them away And that within Eight dayes the said English was to departe for England or loose there lives and this deponant demaunding to see there Authority said he wold not showe it to him, but to his betters And that att the same tyme they Robed & tooke out of this deponents house, goods of one John Browne clerke minister of Sligoe to the vallue of twenty pounds att the least, And that afterwards in the way betwixt Ballenemore & Killeshandra he this deponent his wife and Children were stript & there Cloathes taken from them the six & twentieth day of October aforesaid by some of the said Charles mcGowran, his Company & three pounds in Mony taken, from him by them, there names he knoweth not.

George Bowker of Ballinamore stated:

George Bowker of Ballenemoore in the parish of Owtra Barrony of Carregallon & County of Latrim Tanner Aged thirty fower yeares or thereabouts being duely sworne deposeth that he was Robed and lost since the beginning of the present Rebellion vizt the five & twentieth day of October last All his goods of the seuerall vallues followeing, in Cattle worth ffifty fower pounds, in Corne worth ffifteene pounds, in hay worth ffifty shilings, in the Tanyard in hyds, Leather, and Barke worth ffifty five pounds, in household goods provition, & other goods worth thirty pounds in Monyes twenty pounds, in leases of two poales & three quarters of a poale of land caled by the seuerall names of Drumleyra, kaineboa & Lahard, parte of the proportion of Aghatauy in the Barrony of Carregalle & County aforesaid for Eighteene yeares from the first day of May last vnder the Anuall or yearely rent of twenty Nyne pounds & some smale dutyes worth twenty pounds, in all amounting to the some of One hundreth ffowerscore & sixteene pounds tenn shilings, By the Rebells Charles mcGowran of the Barrony of Tallehay & County of Cavan gent: william Greaham of the same gent: Donell mcGowran of & Phelim mcGowran of the same gent, Brian ô Rorke of the parish of Owtra and County of latrim gent: & two of his sonnes, Teige oge ô Rorke & Brian ô Rorke his sonne of the same gent, Jeffrey ô Rorke of the same gent: James mcCabe of the same gent: & other rebellious Irish persons to the Number of two hundreth or thereabouts that was of there company. And further deposeth that the said Teige oge ô Rorke did say that they had the kings broad seale for to take all the English mens Armes & goods & keepe them till they had further direccions And that all the English was to departe the kingdome within Eight dayes or loose there lives, or words to that effect, And further deposeth that Brian ô Rorke did say that dublin Castle was taken.

Edward Bisphum of Drumreilly stated:

Edward Bisphum of Bowishall in the parish of Drum Rely Barrony of Carregallan and County of Latrim, Clay potter Aged ffifty yeares or thereabouts being duely sworne deposeth that he was Robed and lost since the beginning of the present Rebellion vizt the five & twentieth day of October last 1641 about Nyne of the Clock in the forenoone all his goods being of the vallues followeing in Cattle worth thirty seaven pounds, in Corne worth twenty shilings, in hay worth fforty shilings in household goods, provition and other goods worth thirty pounds in ready monies three pounds, One lease of the poale of land caled Bowishall parte of the proporion of Garvadine in the Barrony aforesaid for Eighteene yeares from the first day of May last vnder the Anuall or yearely Rent of tenn pounds (and other smale dutyes) worth five pounds in all amounting Amounting to the some of threescore and Eighteene £78. By Charles mcGowran of the Barrony of Tallehay in the County of Cavan gent: william Greaham of the same said Barrony of Tallehay & County of Cavan gent: Donnell mcGowran of the same gent: Phelim mGowran of the same gent: ffarrell McGranell alias Reynolds & Cahall his sonne of the said parish of Drum Rely & County of Latrim gent: Jeffrey Granell alias Reynolds & John alias Shane his sonne of the same parish gent: Tirla oge mcMul Moghery of the said parish gent: & diuerse other Rebellious Irish persons with them assembled to the Number of ffifty or thereabouts, And stript this deponent; his wife ffower Children & a Maide servant: caled Elizabeth Bispum, And Robed his said maide servant the same tyme of two English Cowes worth ffower pounds, Att the same tyme saying that this deponent: & the rest must all be gone for England within Eight dayes or be Slaine & kild, And further said that they themselves had the kings broade seale for what they did.

Elizabeth Kiddier of County Leitrim stated:

Elizabeth Kiddier the wife of Tho: Kiddier of Bowhighshell in the County of Leitrim yeoman sworne and examined deposeth and sayth That since the beginning of the present Rebellion vizt about the 25th of October 1641 Her said husband and shee, were deprived robbed or otherwise dispojled of their meanes goods & Chattells Consisting of Beasts Cattle horses Corne hay howsholdgoods & provision: Thinterest of their farme & other thinges of the value of threescore and fowrteene Powndes sterling And that shee and her 2 Children were stript of their clothes & turned out into the Cold aire: Soe that the Children & six more of the Children of others were starved & dyed both in one day & night. And further saith that the Rebells that soe robbed & deprived them of their goods, & that alsoe robbed others of their goods and meanes were theis that followe vizt- Charles McGowran, Gillernew mcGowran & Donell oge mc Gowran and William Grymes all of the Parrish of Templeport & Barrony of Tullehan in the County of Cavan, and Brian ô Rourke and his wiffe of the parrish of Owtraghie, and County of Leitrim ffarrell Mc Granell & Geoffrie McGranell of the Parrish of Drumreleigh & County of Leitrim aforesaid and a greate number of other wicked & Rebellious persons whose names shee knoweth not. And further sajth that the Rebells of the seuerall Counties of Leitrim and Cavan murthered and cruelly slew theis protestants following vizt Robert Hodges & his 2 sonns: Elizabeth Bispham Richard Dudd this deponents brother in lawe) Richard Carrington, William Suggett, & one R Mr Robert Crosse, & The wiffe of one Edward Bispham; And shee was hath credibly heard that the Rebells alsoe hanged a miller one Owen Powell a miller that was sent with a letter from Sir ffrancis Hamilton knighte.

Mary Carr of Oughteragh stated:

Mary Carr the wif Relict of John Carr Late of the Parrish of Owtragh in the County of Leitrim yeoman: (whoe was lately slaine by the Rebells betwixt Bellamont and Dublin) sworne & examined deposeth and saith That on or about the 24th day of October 1641 When the Rebellion was begun shee and her said husband (then alive) were In the parrish aforesaid deprived robbed, & dispoyled of their goods and Chattells Consisting of Cattle horses Corne hay howsholdgoods provition ready mony & other things all Amounting to twoe hundreth Powndes sterling By theis Rebells following vizt- Gillernaw McGowran of Tullahaghe five myles from Belturbett a Comander of Rebells, Charles McGowran of the same his nephew, another Comander of Rebells Brian mcShanaghan of the parrish of Drumreliegh in the County of Leitrim husbandman Donnell dove mcGrourke of the same parrish gent and divers other Rebellious persons whose names shee cannott expresse And they further saith That the Rebells would publiquely & ordinarily: bidd this deponent, her husband & the rest of the English protestants hast away into England. Els they should bee all slaine saying further that all the English must into England, the Scotts into Scotland: & the Irish must bee in Ireland: And that they (meaneing the Rebells) had the Kinges broade seale for what they did.

Peter Lewis of Ballinamore stated:

Peter Lewis of Ballinemore in the Countie of Leytrim ffeltmaker being duly sworne deposeth & saith that about allhallontide last 1641 he this deponent was expelled from deprived robbed or otherwise dispoyled of his goods and Chattell following vizt of Corne worth £3. Cattle £17-7s-4d; a horse and a mare worth £3-10s; in howshold stuffe £4. he was alsoe deprived of the benefitt of his garden worth 11s. to his damage and losse 11s. as the least And in the lease of his howse which he held from the Lord Parsons wherein he had 18 yeares to come worth att the least £6. Soe as this deponents whole losses doe amount vnto £36-17s-4d. And this deponent saith that the parties Rebells that so robbed him were Charles (Summe £27-13s-4d) Magowran of Tullaghae in the Countie of Cavan gent Donnell ô Rourk and Jeffery mcTernon both of the parish of Wortrough in the County of Leytrym gent with divers others of there confederates whose names and places of aboade he doth not well remember....

Sergeant Scott of the garrison in Manorhamilton Castle published a diary in 1645. One entry states:

That gallows was kept busy, for we find that a number of men were tried by and executed under martial law since the beginning of this Rebellion, whose names are given as below. The names of such as have been hanged at Manor Hamilton, by Martial Law since the beginning of this Rebellion ... Edmond MacGawran on 7 January 1643.

=== County Fermanagh depositions ===
Thomas Leysance of Mackan stated:

Thomas Leysance of Mackan in the Countye of fearmangh in the Barrony of Clowneully yeoman Aged twenty foure yeares or ther abouts being duely swearne and examined saith that on the daye and yeare afore saide he was robed and striped be one Redmond oge mc Keawely gentleman Morish Ballaghe mc Kassedy fflearotteragh mc Huigh gentleman and ffleartagh magweire gentleman ffellem maguire gentleman and diuers others of the parish of klineally in the County a ffore saide they being all followers and belonging to Captine Rory Magweire of all thise lands the goodes & Chattles al followeth & things following vizt of the possession & profits of Inprimis the Thirde parte of a greate tate of land Called macken in the Barrony of Clowenally which I he hade in leise fore one and twenty yeares worth to be soulde Tenn pounds ster, and Thirty pounds in redy mony fore Cowes and younge Chattles and fore horses and meres and Coults Corne and haye and howsehould goods and foore tobes of Boutter all which amounts unto towe eight score houndered and eight pounds ster and fouther hee sayeth that vppon the Tweiseday next after the day aboue written, Charles Leysance father to the foresaid Thomas and Mr ffrances shillyart and John Cravann and younge John Cravann his sonn whoe as they weare Comeing frome there one howses towards Doubleinge a little of on this side Clowne Ally Church were assaulted & sett vppon bee ...Dannell magaweran, Gellernowe magawran...all Rebells.

== Siege of Croaghan and Keilagh ==
The castles of Croaghan and Keelagh, Killeshandra belonging to Sir James Craig and Sir Francis Hamilton were besieged by the McGoverns and O'Reillys when the 1641 rebellion started. The inhabitants held out until 15 June 1642 when they surrendered and went to Drogheda. However they occasionally made forays for food during the siege and one of them on 22 April 1642 was made in Tullyhaw when several McGoverns were killed. Dr. Henry Jones relates the incident:

Necessity would not suffer them to be idle, therefore about the 22 of April, did Sir Francis Hamilton, with 210 foot and 40 horse, taken out of both castles goe forth to forrage; and strong hee must goe, all places being strongly laid against him. Hee tooke his way towards Tullagha, and under the covert of a wood laid an ambush of 150 men, sending the other, divided into two companies, together with women and boyes, to gather in and drive away what cattle could thereabouts be met withall, commanding them if set upon by more then they could master, to make their retreat, and draw on the enemy, within the danger of the ambuscado which sorted accordingly, for these forragers were pursued by three hundred of the enemy, who followed them untill falling into the trap prepared for them: they being set upon fell into the wood, whither our foot followed them, and as they fought their wayes out from the foot, the horse that guarded the passages, beat them back into the wood, in which hunting-chace there were slain of them 45, of whom 14 were of the sect of the Macgawrans, all landed men. Few of the rest could have escaped, had not our men been called off by a discovery made by our scouts of another enemy approching Sir Francis having ordered his men for a second service, the rebels though farre exceeding in number, were content to suffer him to passe without any interruption, bringing off with him sixty cows, which were divided between both castles.

Eleanor Reynolds of Lissanover also made a deposition about the siege of Croaghan as follows:

Ellenor Reinolds of Late of Lissanore in the County of Cauan widow aged 46 yeares or thereabouts duly sworne etc. saith that one Gillernoo mc Gowran of Kildoe Co. Cavan aforesaid, Hugh mc Manus oag mc Gowran of the same gent, Hugh oag mc Hugh mc Gowran with divers others to the number of about 300 hauing been in the night of the 24th of October 1641 at divers houses of the English inhabitants in the parish of Dromlane and robbed & stripped them of all their goods & wearing clothes they came the next morning to this deponents dwelling house and lands at Lissanore & then & there robbed & tooke away with them 71 Cowes, besides many yong Cattle, eleuen stoodd mares & other horses & Colts to the value of £200 & upwards & carryed them from the said land. The night following also there came to this deponents house Tirlogh o Reily a deputy sub sheriff to one Laughlin Bane, and Hugh mc Hugh mc Manus mc Gowran aforesaid Thomas mc Ooney mc Gowran and Cormack mc Gowran of Munlogh uncle to the said Thomas Ooney mc Gowran and divers other Rebels to the number of three of or fower score, and there did abide drinking all night & often threatned to Murther this deponents husband and her father, which they often said they would doe & did attempt it but by fortune the Masse priest of the parish lodging there that night threatned them with Curses till they promised not to hurt them, but in the morning they plundered all the house & caried what was left by the former Rebells away with them. She further saith that the said Gillernooe did afterwards possesse himself of this deponents dwelling house & eleuen Reeks of hay, and a faire haggard full of Corne, as also her Corne in ground all worth at least £150 sterling and would not allow one peck of the said Corne to mainteine this deponent & her father, husband & family. She further saith that about a full moneth after the first rising one Charles mc Gouran of Ballimackgouran, Co. Cavan aforesaid came to the priests house situate neer this deponents dwelling house & thence tooke away 2 of this deponents trunks full of fine linen wearing apparell & plate & other goods & writings of great concernment, & broke open the said Trunks & made vse of the goods therin, though he had formerly engaged not to medle with them but to keep them safe for this deponent: whereby this deponent lost aboue £100 sterling. This deponent further saith that the aforesaid Tirlogh Rely and Hugh mc Hugh mc Manus oag mc Gowran sent divers Rogues to haue murthered this deponents husband & her father, but having some intelligence thereof they conveyed themselves to the said priests house where they were kept & hid for 14 daies till opportunity served to convey them to the Castle of Croghan. She further saith that in May 1642 this deponents mother not being able (because of age & weaknes) to goe to Croghan Castle was left behind with some of the tenants at Lissanore aforesaid, where she was about the tyme aforesaid barbarously murthered by one ffarell Groome mc Kellogher of CrossemacKellogher who confessed the said barbarous fact to divers persons that voluntarily did depose the same to be true. This deponent further saith that the said month of May 1642 she saw one Mr Richard Ash of Lissomean and one Loughlin bane mc Moister under sheriff of the County with divers other Rebels in armes & helping to besiege the Castle of Croghan. She further saith that the said Laughlin sent 2 or 3 Rogues about 3 daies before the first rising to this deponents said Land of Lissanore & thence they stolle a mare of this deponents & a 3 yeare old Colt worth £50; which Colt this deponent did see afterwards with the said Laughlin riding on him at the aforesaid tyme of besiedging of Croghan Castle, and that the said Mr Ash was riding on a white horse then with the said Laughlin as aforesaid. She further deposeth that about Midsomer 1642 the said Mr Ash did take from a Kinswoman of one ffrancis Sugden at Lissomean some parcells of plate by the way as the English were going towards Drogheda from Croghan Castle and Convoied by the said Ash with a great Company of Irish souldiers titherwards which was Contrary to the Conditions of quarter at the said Castle of Croghan agreed upon. And further she this Examinate deposeth not the marke [mark] of Ellenor Reinolds.

John Simpson of Killeshandra also made a deposition about the siege of Keelagh:

John Simpson late of Killshandrah in the County of Cavan gent, (Lieutenant to Sir ffrancis Hamilton knight and Barronet) aged about 39 yeres: sworne and examined before his Maiesties Commissioners deposeth and saith That he this deponent was with the said Sir ffrancis Hamilton in his Castle of Kyloghe in the same County all the time from the beginning of the present Rebellion vntill that the said Sir ffrancis did take quarter from the Rebells which was about the 4th of June 1642 And saith that when hee tooke quarter which was about the same tyme he He this deponent very well remembreth that certeine Articles were made perfected and sworne vnto by Phillip Mc Hugh ô Rely Esquire Phillip mc Mulmore ô Rely Esquire Edmund ô Rely Esquire James Newgent Esquire Richard Ash Esquire <a> Myles Rely Esquire John Kernon gent Hugh Booy o Rely gentleman Charles Mc Gowran gent all Rebells and divers others of the Irish gentrymen In and by which Articles those Rebells aforenamed agreed Covenanted and bound themselues that the Castle of the said Sir ffrancis Hamilton: And alsoe the Cast{le} of the said Sir James Craige knight together with the gardens and orchards thereunto belonging should not be broken downe demolished burned or spoiled in any manner whatsoeuer But that they would putt safegards into the Castles for preserving of them and their gardens and orchards....

When Croaghan and Keelagh surrendered, Charles Magauran was one of the signatories to the surrender agreement:

Articles of agreement concluded and agreed upon, the quarter give by Philip Mac Hugh Mac Shan Rely, and the rest of the gentlemen hereunder named to Sir Francis Hamilton concerning the castles of Kylagh and Crohan, in manner and forme following, bearing date the fourth of June 1642. In primis, it is agreed by, and between these parties following, viz. Sir Francis Hamilton Knight and Baronet, in the behalfe of the Lady Mary Craige, himselfe, the gentlemen, gentlewomen, souldiers, and all others both men, women and children, of what degree, condition, or quality whatsoever, belonging unto, or being in either of both castles, viz. Kylagh and Crohan, shall have safe quarter from Philip Mac Hugh Relie, Edmond Relie, Philip Mac Mulmore Relie, Mulmore Mac Edmond Relie, Hugh Buii Relie, John Mac Philip Relie, Philip Roe Relie, James Neugent, R. A., Owen Rourke Esquires, Edmond Mac Owen Relie, Ferall Oge Relie, Charles Mac Gauran, Daniel Mac Gauran, Iohn Mac Kernan, Conner Relie, Tirlagh Relie, and Cahil Relie, to bee convoyed to Doghedah with saftie of their lives, and of their bag and baggage, which they shall carry with them and that such persons above named as are herein mentioned by particular name....Lastly, for the due and true performance of this agreement and every point therein contained, both parties shall make choyce of the most principall gentlemen on either side to sweare that they will truly and faithfully performe according to this agreement, and every point therein contained, and likewise set their hands and seales the day and yeere above written- Philip Relie, Edmond Rely, Philip Rely, Mulmore Rely, Hugh Rely, John Rely, Philip Rely, James Neugent, R.A., Owen Rourke, Edmond Rely, Ferall Rely, Charles Mac Gauran, Daniel Mac Gauran, John Mac Kernan, Conner Rely, Mulmore Relie, Turlagh Relie.

== Battle of Benburb ==
At the Battle of Benburb on 5 June 1646, the McGoverns fought beside Owen Roe O'Neill, probably under the leadership of Charles Magauran. His great-great grandson Major Edward Magauran refers to this event in his autobiography wherein he states- "I was born in 1746 at the residence of the M'Gauran family, called from them Balli M’Gauran. It is a market town of some note, wherein four considerable fairs are annually held. During their prosperous days, a stately castle reared its head, adjoining to the town, and was the abode of the Barons, but it was dismantled by order of Oliver Cromwell, and now lies in ruins. My great grandfather having thus involved himself in O'Neil's rebellion, and thereby forfeited his estates, they remained in the Crown till the reign of King James the Second".

== Cromwellian confiscations ==
In 1657 A list of the Papist Proprietors names in the County of Cavan, as they are returned in the Civill Surveys of the said County gave the names of 20 landowners whose property was confiscated in the barony of Tullyhaw. These were Cormock MacBryan MacGowran; Bryan Oge MacGowran; Thomas MacGowran; Ffarrell MacHugh MacMarcus Oge MacGowran; Bryan Oge MacGowran; Daniell MacGowran; Philemy Oge MacGowran; Gilderneve MacGowran; Charles MacGowran; Nicholas O'Gowean; William MacGreame, gent.; William Gryme; Daniell MacGourke; Philip Mac Mullmore O'Rely; Charles O'Rely; Shane Reagh O'Rely; Hugh O'Rely; Owny Sherridan; James Talbott, Esq.

| Preceded by Brian Magauran | Chief of McGovern clan -1641–1657- AD | Succeeded by Colonel Bryan Magauran |
