= Gortaclogher =

Townland in County Cavan, Ireland

Coordinates: 54.0895°N 7.6863°W

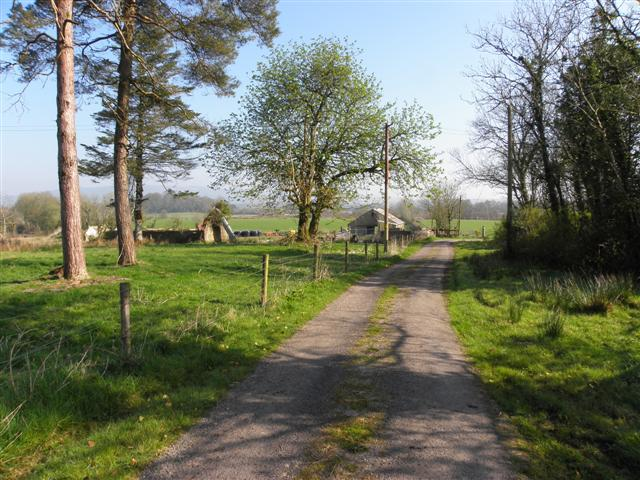
Rural scenery in Gortaclogher townland

Gortaclogher (from Irish Gort an Chlochair, meaning 'The Small Field of the Stony Path') is a townland in the civil parish of Templeport, County Cavan, Ireland. It lies in the Roman Catholic parish of Templeport and barony of Tullyhaw.

== Geography ==
Gortaclogher is bounded on the north by Gowlagh South, Cloncurkney and Corboy Glebe townlands, on the west by Boley and Killyran townlands, on the south by Killywillin townland and on the east by Killymoriarty and Ray, Templeport townlands. Its chief geographical features are Templeport Lough, Killywillin Lough, Gortaclogher Lough, the River Blackwater, County Cavan, a wood and dug wells. Gortaclogher is traversed by minor roads, rural lanes and the disused Cavan and Leitrim Railway. The townland covers 253 statute acres.

== History ==
In medieval times the McGovern barony of Tullyhaw was divided into economic taxation areas called ballibetoes, from the Irish Baile Biataigh (Anglicized as 'Ballybetagh'), meaning 'A Provisioner's Town or Settlement'. The original purpose was to enable the farmer, who controlled the baile, to provide hospitality for those who needed it, such as poor people and travellers. The ballybetagh was further divided into townlands farmed by individual families who paid a tribute or tax to the head of the ballybetagh, who in turn paid a similar tribute to the clan chief. The steward of the ballybetagh would have been the secular equivalent of the erenagh in charge of church lands. There were seven ballibetoes in the parish of Templeport. Gortaclogher was located in the ballybetagh of Ballymagauran. The historical spellings of the ballybetagh are Ballymackgawran & Ballimacgawran (Irish = Baile Mhic Shamhráin = McGovern's Town).

The 1609 Baronial Map depicts the townland as Errenagh (from Irish Airchinnech meaning "The Erenagh's Land").

The 1652 Commonwealth Survey spells the name as Gartechlogher.

The 1665 Down Survey map depicts it as Gortlogher.

William Petty's 1685 map depicts it as Gortlogher.

In the Plantation of Ulster by grant dated 29 April 1611, along with other lands, King James VI and I granted one poll of Errenagh to the McGovern Chief, Feidhlimidh Mág Samhradháin. The townland had been part of the McGovern chief's personal demesne for several hundred years before this and it was just a Surrender and regrant confirming the existing title to the then chief. This is confirmed in a visitation by George Carew, 1st Earl of Totnes in autumn 1611 when he states that Magauran had his own land given him on this division.

An Inquisition of King Charles I of England held in Cavan town on 4 October 1626 stated that the aforesaid Phelim Magawrane died on 20 January 1622 and his lands, including 1 poll in Errenagh, went to his son, the McGovern chief Brian Magauran, who was aged 30 (born 1592) and married.

The McGovern lands in Gortaclogher were confiscated in the Cromwellian Act for the Settlement of Ireland 1652 and were distributed as follows-

The 1652 Commonwealth Survey lists the proprietor as being William Brampson, who also appears as proprietor for several other Templeport townlands in the same survey.

In the Hearth Money Rolls compiled on 29 September 1663 there were two people paying the Hearth Tax in Gartelaher- Castara O Dolan and Thomas McEtire.

A grant dated 3 November 1666 was made by King Charles II of England to Sir Tristram Beresford, 1st Baronet which included, inter alia, the lands of Gortcloghir. By grant dated 11 September 1670 from King Charles II of England to said Sir Tristram Beresford, the said lands of Gatcloghir were included in the creation of a new Manor of Beresford.

On 10 April 1716, Marcus Beresford, 1st Earl of Tyrone the son of the aforesaid Sir Tristram Beresford, granted a lease for lives of certain lands, including Gortneclogh, to James Kirkwood of Owen Gally (Owengallees). In a marriage settlement made 18 Oct 1718 with his wife Katherine (née Lowther), the said James Kirkwood settled the lands, including Gortneclough, on his children. Katherine Lowther's sister-in-law, Jane Lowther (née Beresford), was the daughter of the aforesaid Sir Tristram Beresford, which is probably how the lease came about. James Kirkwood was son of Reverend James Kirkwood, Chaplain to King William III of England, Prebendary of Kilskeery and Rector of Magheracross parishes in County Fermanagh from 1693.

In the 1761 Irish general election there was only one landowner in Gortaclogher registered to vote, William Hall of Dromore, County Fermanagh. He was entitled to cast two votes. The four election candidates were Charles Coote, 1st Earl of Bellomont and Lord Newtownbutler (later Brinsley Butler, 2nd Earl of Lanesborough), both of whom were then elected Member of Parliament for Cavan County. The losing candidates were George Montgomery (MP) of Ballyconnell and Barry Maxwell, 1st Earl of Farnham. Absence from the poll book either meant a resident did not vote or, more likely, was not a freeholder entitled to vote, which would mean most of the inhabitants of Gortaclogher.

The 1790 Cavan Carvaghs list spells the townland name as Gortclogher.

The Tithe Applotment Books for 1827 list fourteen tithepayers in the townland.

In 1833 two people in Gortaclogher were registered as a keeper of weapons- Peter Brannan and Thomas Magee.

The Gortaclogher Valuation Office Field books are available for October 1839.

Griffith's Valuation of 1857 lists thirty four landholders in the townland.

On 6 July 1857 the Incumbered Estates Commission published the following notice-

In the Matter of the Estate of James Brien, Geo. Brien, Edward Brien and Francis Brien, Owners. Exparte by Isabella Crummer, Petitioner. The commissioners having ordered a Sale of the Lands of Shanadaragh and Curnagunlogh, Cullegh, Drumlohgher, Drumledin, Sananaragh, and Drumledin, and Corlough, situate in the Barony of Tullyhaw, and County of Cavan, held under lease dated the 10th April, 1718, from the Bishop Raphoe, for lives renewable for ever, and which Lands are included in the denominations of Ballymagord, Owngally, Gortneglough, Drumedin or Ballylennin, in said lease mentioned:

== Census ==
Year	Population	Males	Females	Total Houses	Uninhabited
1841	113	54	59	20	0
1851	95	42	53	13	0
1861	74	38	36	11	0
1871	55	27	28	11	0
1881	25	12	13	13	0
1891	55	30	25	11	2

In the 1901 census of Ireland, there are eleven families listed in the townland and in the 1911 census of Ireland, there are only ten families listed in the townland.

== Antiquities ==
The only structure of historical interest in the townland is the disused Cavan and Leitrim Railway.
