= Porturlan =

Townland in the civil parish of Templeport, County Cavan, Ireland

Coordinates: 54.07514°N 7.810271°W

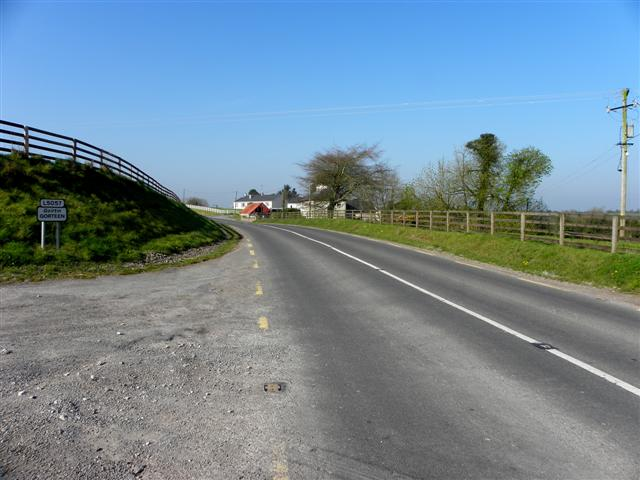
R205 road at Porturlan townland, Templeport, County Cavan, Ireland, heading WSW.

Porturlan (from Irish either Port Úrlainn meaning 'Bank or Landing Place of the Spear-shaft' or Port Turlainn meaning "Port of the Beach" or Port na Leath Inse meaning the 'Landing Place of the Half-Island or Peninsula' or Port-na-h-Urlaidhe-h-Innsi meaning "The slaughter-bank of the island") (Likeliest meaning is the departure beach for St. Mogue's Island in Templeport Lough) is a townland in the civil parish of Templeport, County Cavan, Ireland. It lies in the Roman Catholic parish of Templeport and barony of Tullyhaw.

== Geography ==
Porturlan is bounded on the north by Ray, Templeport townland, on the west by Killymoriarty and Killywillin townlands, on the south by Derryragh townland and on the east by Camagh and Rosehill, Templeport townlands. Its chief geographical features are a spring well and pasturelands. Porturlan is traversed by the regional R205 road (Ireland), minor roads and rural lanes. The townland covers 68 statute acres.

== History ==
In medieval times the McGovern barony of Tullyhaw was divided into economic taxation areas called ballibetoes, from the Irish Baile Biataigh (Anglicized as 'Ballybetagh'), meaning 'A Provisioner's Town or Settlement'. The original purpose was to enable the farmer, who controlled the baile, to provide hospitality for those who needed it, such as poor people and travellers. The ballybetagh was further divided into townlands farmed by individual families who paid a tribute or tax to the head of the ballybetagh, who in turn paid a similar tribute to the clan chief. The steward of the ballybetagh would have been the secular equivalent of the erenagh in charge of church lands. There were seven ballibetoes in the parish of Templeport. Porturlan was located in the ballybetagh of Ballymagauran. The historical spellings of the ballybetagh are Ballymackgawran & Ballimacgawran (Irish = Baile Mhic Shamhráin = McGovern's Town).

In medieval times Porturlan stretched northward up to Templeport Lough and included the modern townland of Ray, together with other subdivisions called Killcroghan (from Irish either Cill Cruachán or Coill Cruachán meaning 'The Wood of the Round Hill' or "The Church of the Round Hill") and Alico.

The 1609 Baronial Map depicts the townland as Kilcrooghan.

The 1652 Commonwealth Survey lists it as Killecrooghan.

The 1665 Down Survey map depicts it as Killerachan.

William Petty's 1685 map depicts it as Killracan.

In the Plantation of Ulster by grant dated 29 April 1611, along with other lands, King James VI and I granted the two polls of Killcroghan and one poll of Porturilinchy to the McGovern Chief, Feidhlimidh Mág Samhradháin. The townland had been part of the McGovern chief's personal demesne for several hundred years before this and it was just a Surrender and regrant confirming the existing title to the then chief. This is confirmed in a visitation by George Carew, 1st Earl of Totnes in autumn 1611 when he states that Magauran had his own land given him on this division.

An Inquisition of King Charles I of England held in Cavan town on 4 October 1626 stated that the aforesaid Phelim Magawrane died on 20 January 1622 and his lands, including two polls of Kilcroghan and one poll of Portnerilinchy, went to his son, the McGovern chief Brian Magauran, who was aged 30 (born 1592) and married.

The McGovern lands in Porturlan were confiscated in the Cromwellian Act for the Settlement of Ireland 1652 and were distributed as follows-

The 1652 Commonwealth Survey lists the proprietor of Killecrooghan as John Boyd.

In the Hearth Money Rolls compiled on 29 September 1663 there were two people paying the Hearth Tax in Killecrohean- John Bride and Robert Grige.

A grant dated 30 January 1668 was made from King Charles II of England to Mary Boyd for the 34 acres and 6 perches in the parts of ye cartron of Kilcrohan at an annual rent of nine shillings and twopence farthing. A grant dated 30 January 1668 was made from King Charles II of England to William Chambers for 20 acres 2 roods and 27 perches in Porturlan alias Killcroghan at an annual rent of fourteen shillings and sixpence. A grant dated 9 September 1669 was made from King Charles II of England to Arthur Annesley, 1st Earl of Anglesey, for 27 acres in the south part of Killerachan at an annual rent of seven shillings and threepence halfpenny and for 17 acres and 3 perches in the northwest part of Killerachan at an annual rent of four shillings and seven pence.

A deed dated 13 Nov 1738 includes: Killiraghan and Purturlins.

The 1790 Cavan Carvaghs list spells the name as Porturlin.

The Tithe Applotment Books for 1827 list seven tithepayers in the townland.

In the early 1800s a Sunday school was kept in the townland, funded by the Hibernian Sunday School Society. In June 1819 it had an attendance of 100 scholars.

The Porturlan Valuation Office Field books are available for 1839-1840.

A rental with a list of tenants of the Thornton estate in Porturlan dated 1843 is held in The County Cavan Archives (ref P016/005).

Griffith's Valuation of 1857 lists five landholders in the townland.

== Census ==
Year	Population	Males	Females	Total Houses	Uninhabited
1841	13	7	6	3	0
1851	16	9	7	5	1
1861	31	18	13	7	0
1871	32	18	14	6	1
1881	24	13	11	5	0
1891	32	16	16	5	0

In the 1901 census of Ireland, there are seven families listed in the townland, and in the 1911 census of Ireland, there are only six families listed in the townland.

== Porturlan School ==
The book Bawnboy and Templeport History Heritage Folklore by Chris Maguire gives the following description of the school-

Porturlan National School. Built 1890. Principal Teachers- Michael Heery (1899- ); James Wrynn (circa 1926); Patrick Kelly ( ); Mr. Fleming (-1937-); Mrs. E. Tiernan (1937-'50); Séamus Maguire (1950-'54); Máirtín McGowan (1954-'68). Assistants Teachers- Kate Beatty; Rose Maguire; Nuala Waldron; Lily Flanagan; Margaret Mulligan; Betty Reynolds. Porturlan school closed 1st October 1968 and pupils transferred to Corran school.

== Antiquities ==
There don't seem to be any structures of historical interest in the townland apart from a limekiln.
