= Killywillin =

Townland in County Cavan, Ireland

Killywillin (from Irish Coill an Mhuillinn, 'Wood of the Mill') is a townland in the civil parish of Templeport, County Cavan, Ireland. It lies in the Roman Catholic parish of Templeport and barony of Tullyhaw.

== Geography ==
Killywillin is bounded on the north by Gortaclogher and Killymoriarty townlands, on the west by Killyran townland, on the south by Ballymagauran and Derryragh townlands and on the east by Porturlan townland. Its chief geographical features are Killywillin Lough, the River Blackwater, County Cavan, spring wells and a quarry. Killywillin is traversed by the regional R205 road (Ireland), minor roads, rural lanes and the disused Cavan and Leitrim Railway. The townland covers 202 statute acres.

== Etymology ==
There was a medieval corn-mill on the River Blackwater, from which the townland derives its name.

== History ==
In medieval times the McGovern barony of Tullyhaw was divided into economic taxation areas called ballibetoes, from the Irish Baile Biataigh (Anglicized as 'Ballybetagh'), meaning 'A Provisioner's Town or Settlement'. The original purpose was to enable the farmer, who controlled the baile, to provide hospitality for those who needed it, such as poor people and travellers. The ballybetagh was further divided into townlands farmed by individual families who paid a tribute or tax to the head of the ballybetagh, who in turn paid a similar tribute to the clan chief. The steward of the ballybetagh would have been the secular equivalent of the erenagh in charge of church lands. There were seven ballibetoes in the parish of Templeport. Killywillin was located in the ballybetagh of Ballymagauran. The historical spellings of the ballybetagh are Ballymackgawran & Ballimacgawran (Irish = Baile Mhic Shamhráin = McGovern's Town).

The earliest known mention of Killywillin is in the Irish annals for 1495 A.D. concerning the death of the McGovern clan chief, Feidhlimidh Mág Samhradháin, the First, who ruled from 1478 to 15 Feb 1495.

The Annals of Ulster state- Mag Samradhain, namely, Feidhlimidh, son of Thomas, son of Ferghal, son of Thomas, son of Brian the Bregian, namely, chief of Tellach-Eathach, was drowned at the crannóg of Killywillin Lough (loch crannoigi Caille an Mhuilinn), the feast day of Berach, Sunday, this year and his other brother, namely, Domnall Gapped tooth, was made Mag Samradhain.

The Annals of the Four Masters state- Magauran (Felim, the son of Thomas, son of Brian Breaghach), Chief of Tullyhaw, was drowned at the crannóg of Killywillin Lough (Loch Crannóicce Caille an Mhuilinn); and Donnell Bearnagh, his brother, took his place.

The Annals of Lough Cé state- Mac Samhradhain, i.e. Fedhlim, was drowned; and Domhnall Bernach was proclaimed Mac Samradhain in his place.

The Annals of Connacht state- Mac Samradain, that is Feidlim, was drowned and Domnall Bernach was proclaimed Mac Samradain in succession to him.

The 1609 Baronial Map depicts the townland as Kilmoylen.

The 1652 Commonwealth Survey lists the townland as Killevollyn.

The 1665 Down Survey map depicts it as Killicellin.

William Petty's 1685 map depicts it as Killcellcey.

In the Plantation of Ulster by grant dated 29 April 1611, along with other lands, King James VI and I granted one poll of Killemullane to the McGovern Chief, Feidhlimidh Mág Samhradháin. The townland had been part of the McGovern chief's personal demesne for several hundred years before this and it was just a Surrender and regrant confirming the existing title to the then chief. This is confirmed in a visitation by George Carew, 1st Earl of Totnes in autumn 1611 when he states that Magauran had his own land given him on this division.

An Inquisition of King Charles I of England held in Cavan town on 4 October 1626 stated that the aforesaid Phelim Magawrane died on 20 January 1622 and his lands, including one poll of Killemullan, went to his son, the McGovern chief Brian Magauran who was aged 30 (born 1592) and married.

The McGovern lands in Killywillin were confiscated in the Cromwellian Act for the Settlement of Ireland 1652 and were distributed as follows-

The 1652 Commonwealth Survey lists the proprietor as Hugh McCahy.

In the Hearth Money Rolls compiled on 29 September 1663 there was one Hearth Tax payer in Killiwillin- Hugh McCoy, which seems to be the same person listed in the 1652 survey.

A grant dated 3 November 1666 was made by King Charles II of England to Sir Tristram Beresford, 1st Baronet which included, inter alia, one cartron of Killinellin or Killiwillin containing 87 acres-0 roods-16 perches of profitable land and 26 acres-5 roods-8 perches of unprofitable land. By grant dated 11 September 1670 from King Charles II of England to said Sir Tristram Beresford, the said lands of Killmellin or Killywillin were included in the creation of a new Manor of Beresford.

In the Templeport Poll Book of 1761 there were three people registered to vote in Killywilly in the 1761 Irish general election - Robert Johnston, Thomas Jones and Alexander Patterson. They all lived in Killywillin and were entitled to two votes each. The four election candidates were Charles Coote, 1st Earl of Bellomont and Lord Newtownbutler (later Brinsley Butler, 2nd Earl of Lanesborough), both of whom were then elected Member of Parliament for Cavan County. The losing candidates were George Montgomery (MP) of Ballyconnell and Barry Maxwell, 1st Earl of Farnham. Johnston and Patterson both voted for Coote and Montgomery. Jones voted for Newtownbutler and Coote. Absence from the poll book either meant a resident did not vote or more likely was not a freeholder entitled to vote, which would mean most of the inhabitants of Killywillin.

The 1790 Cavan Carvaghs list spells the name as Kilullin.

A map dated of the townland dated April 1794 is held in The County Cavan Archives (ref P017/0025). The description is-

Map of Killywilly (Killawilla or Killwilly), part of Ballymagauran, 'the coppy, and the commons,' held by Lancelot Slack from the Right Honourable Marquis of Waterford. Land surveyed is in the parish of Templeport, county Cavan. Survey completed by Nicholas Willoughby. Position of river, two lakes, an unnamed town and the 'Portarl. Road' are shown. Adjacent land occupier is named as Reverend Arthur Ellis. Total of land surveyed is 199 acres, 3 roods and 36 perches plantation measure.

The Tithe Applotment Books for 1827 list thirty two tithepayers in the townland.

The Killywillin Valuation Office Field books are available for October 1839.

On 3 November 1844 a threatening notice was posted on the house of Peter Kiernan of Killywillin ordering him, in the name of Captain Smart, to deliver up possession of his holdings from which the former tenants were ejected for non-payment of rent.

Griffith's Valuation of 1857 lists twenty one landholders in the townland.

A deed dated 20 July 1865 now in the Cavan Archives Service (ref P017/0077) is described as-

Draft reconveyance of mortgage made between Francis Armstrong, esquire, of the first part, Reverend Thomas Crawford, clerk, Rector of Drumcliffe, County Sligo, and Anne Crawford otherwise Armstrong, his wife, of the second part, [Adan] Crawford, Cockspin Street, Middlesex, esquire, medical doctor, and George Kenny Sawtell, John Street, Bedford Row, London, gentleman, of the third part, Thomas Slack, esquire, and Susanna Slack, his wife, Marshwood, Newtowngore, County Cavan, of the fourth part, and John Ouseley Bansale, 1 Eldon terrace, South Circular Road, City of Dublin, esquire, and Arthur John Vesey Lindsay Birchall, esquire, Blackrock, County Leitrim, esquire, of the fifth part. Relates to reconveyance of lands secured by mortgage dated 12 July 1823. Lands affected are the six poles of Ballymcgouran otherwise Ballymagouran otherwise Ballymagauran containing around 64 acres and 3 roods; the halfpole of Derryragh otherwise Derrinagh with the subdenominations of Killywilly containing 111 acres; Cappy containing around 20 acres; and the Common containing around 4 acres and 36 perches, all in the parish of Templeport, barony of Tullyhaw, County Cavan. Principal, interest and costs on the mortgage amount to £461.10.9. Details of other relevant deeds are recited.

== Census ==
Year	Population	Males	Females	Total Houses	Uninhabited
1841	127	59	68	25	1
1851	65	34	31	17	1
1861	76	41	35	17	0
1871	87	42	45	17	0
1881	86	44	44	15	0
1891	74	38	36	14	0

In the 1901 census of Ireland, there are sixteen families listed in the townland, and in the 1911 census of Ireland, there are seventeen families listed in the townland.

== Killywillin School ==
The Second Report from the Commissioners of Irish Education Inquiry dated 1826 stated that Patrick McGuin, a Catholic, was the headmaster of the school which was a pay school with a salary of £15 per annum. The schoolhouse was built of mud at a cost of 6 guineas. There were 35 pupils of which 17 were Roman Catholics and 18 were Church of Ireland. 21 were boys and 14 were girls. Bawnboy and Templeport History Heritage and Folklore - Past and Present It was closed before 1900.

== Antiquities ==
1. A crannóg in Killywillin Lough 25 metres from the shore. This is the crannóg referred to in the above entry in the Irish annals for 1495.
2. An earthen ringfort.

== See also ==
- Feidhlimidh Mág Samhradháin, the First
