= Boley, Templeport =

Townland in County Cavan, Ireland

Coordinates: 54.086937°N 7.703992°W

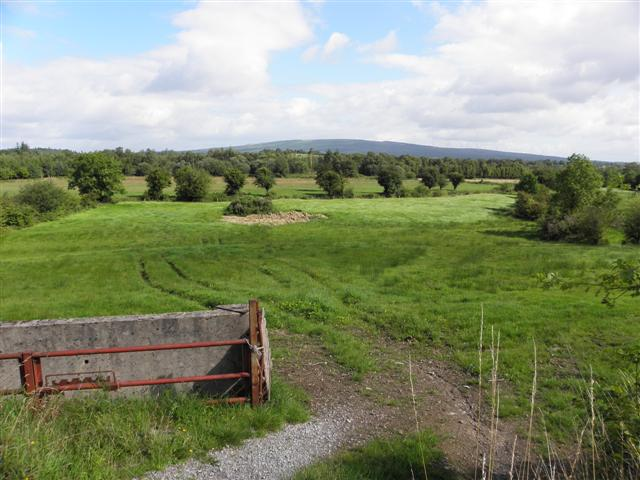
Boley townland, Templeport, County Cavan, Ireland, looking NNE in the direction of Gowlagh South

Boley (from Irish Buaile meaning 'A Paddock Dairy for Milking Cows') is a townland in the civil parish of Templeport, County Cavan, Ireland. It lies in the Roman Catholic parish of Templeport and barony of Tullyhaw.

== Geography ==
Boley is bounded on the north by Stranadarragh, Owengallees and Gowlagh South townlands, on the west by Cornagunleog townland, on the south by Killyran townland and by Glebe townland in County Leitrim and on the east by Gortaclogher townland. Its chief geographical features are the River Blackwater, County Cavan, a spring well, dug wells and forestry plantations. Boley is traversed by the L1037 road, minor public roads and rural lanes. The townland covers 295 statute acres.

== History ==
In medieval times the McGovern barony of Tullyhaw was divided into economic taxation areas called ballibetoes, from the Irish Baile Biataigh (Anglicized as 'Ballybetagh'), meaning 'A Provisioner's Town or Settlement'. The original purpose was to enable the farmer, who controlled the baile, to provide hospitality for those who needed it, such as poor people and travellers. The ballybetagh was further divided into townlands farmed by individual families who paid a tribute or tax to the head of the ballybetagh, who in turn paid a similar tribute to the clan chief. The steward of the ballybetagh would have been the secular equivalent of the erenagh in charge of church lands. There were seven ballibetoes in the parish of Templeport. Boley was located in the ballybetagh of Ballymagauran. The historical spellings of the ballybetagh are Ballymackgawran & Ballimacgawran (Irish = Baile Mhic Shamhráin = McGovern's Town).

The townland name first appears in an interesting list of the rents due to the McGovern Chief, Maghnus 'Ruadh' Mág Samhradháin about 1400 A.D. It reads as follows-

34 kegs of butter for the half-quarterland of Buaile Fheadha (lethceathreamain Buaili Adh, meaning 'The Half-Quarterland of the Dairy in the Forest') i.e. 3 kegs of butter and 12 kegs of meal every quarter year i.e. the winter quarter and the autumn quarter and that of spring, and this is the steward's portion:- A gallon of butter and 2 kegs of meal per quarter, and this is McGovern's demand from An Bhuaile (mBuaili):- A keg of butter and 3 bands, and a gallon and 3/8 of a hundredweight and a band, and this is his milk-portion in wintertime:- A keg of butter on the first Saturday, and 3/8 the following Saturday, and a gallon on each of the other Saturdays, and 3/8 the following Saturday and a band soon after that, and the person who comes with it is told to bring his portion of milk with him and let him have the strainer with him, with which he will choose the curds until the pool of milk is separated also.

From this list we see that in 1400 the main type of farming carried on in Boley was dairy farming together with oats.

The 1609 Baronial Map depicts the townland as Boilie.

The 1652 Commonwealth Survey lists the townland as Bwoly.

The 1665 Down Survey map depicts it as Boyley.

William Petty's 1685 map depicts it as Boyler.

In the Plantation of Ulster by grant dated 29 April 1611, along with other lands, King James VI and I granted the two polls of Boely to the McGovern Chief, Feidhlimidh Mág Samhradháin. The townland had been part of the McGovern chief's personal demesne for several hundred years before this and it was just a Surrender and regrant confirming the existing title to the then chief. This is confirmed in a visitation by George Carew, 1st Earl of Totnes in autumn 1611 when he states that Magauran had his own land given him on this division.

An Inquisition of King Charles I held in Cavan town on 4 October 1626 stated that the aforesaid Phelim Magawrane died on 20 January 1622 and his lands including two polls of Boely went to his son, the McGovern chief Brian Magauran who was aged 30 (born 1592) and married.

The McGovern lands in Boley were confiscated in the Cromwellian Act for the Settlement of Ireland 1652 and were distributed as follows-

In the Hearth Money Rolls of 1662 there was nobody paying the Hearth Tax in the townland.

The 1652 Commonwealth Survey lists the townland as belonging to Lieutenant-Colonel Tristam Beresford and a further confirming grant dated 3 November 1666 was made by King Charles II of England to the aforementioned Sir Tristram Beresford, 1st Baronet which included, inter alia, 2 cartrons of land in Doyly containing 285 acres-3 roods. By grant dated 11 September 1670 from King Charles II of England to said Sir Tristram Beresford, the said lands of Boyly were included in the creation of a new Manor of Beresford.

The 1790 Cavan Carvaghs list spells the townland name as Baly.

Ambrose Leet's 1814 Directory spells the name as Boley.

In the 1825 Registry of Freeholders for County Cavan there were four freeholders registered in Boley- Hugh Banan, Patrick Smyth, Michael Smyth and Hugh Smyth. They were all Forty-shilling freeholders holding a lease for lives from their landlord John Foster.

The Tithe Applotment Books for 1827 list ten tithepayers in the townland.

In 1833 one person in Boley was registered as a keeper of weapons- Robert Harper, who owned a gun, pistol, sword and bayonet.

The Boley Valuation Office Field books are available for 1839–1840.

Griffith's Valuation of 1857 lists twenty three landholders in the townland.

== Boley School ==
The Second Report from the Commissioners of Irish Education Inquiry dated 1826 stated that Peter Magauran, a Catholic, was the headmaster of the school which was a pay school with a salary of £16 per annum. It was under the patronage of the London Hibernian Society. The schoolhouse was a mud cabin which cost £9 to erect. There were 132 pupils of which 115 were Roman Catholics and 17 Church of Ireland. 66 were boys and 66 were girls. There was also a night school held in the same building under the same headmaster. It had 60 pupils of whom 57 were Catholic and 3 Church of Ireland. All were male so it was probably for adults. It was closed before 1900.

== Killyran School ==
The book Bawnboy and Templeport History Heritage Folklore by Chris Maguire gives the following description of Killyran Protestant school, which was actually located in the townland of Boley, not Killyran -

Killyran National School Teachers 1826-1966:- Mrs. Coffey; Miss Abraham; Miss Stafford; Master Smyth; Mrs. Alicia Whyte; Miss Helena Pringle; Miss Emma Corbett; Miss Ivy Hall; Miss Frances Rountree; Miss Esme Walpole; Miss Audrey Byers; Miss Iris Neill; Miss Audrey Kells; Mrs. Lindsay.

The 1874 Report from the Commissioners of National Education in Ireland state that Killyran School, Roll No. 9969, had 81 pupils, 51 boys and 30 girls.

In 1890 there were 63 pupils.

The 1938 Dúchas Folklore collection from Killyran School is available at-

A description of Killyran School in the 1930s by a schoolboy is viewable online.

== Census ==
Year	Population	Males	Females	Total Houses	Uninhabited
1841	102	55	47	13	0
1851	72	36	36	12	1
1861	71	30	41	14	2
1871	54	29	25	10	0
1881	59	32	27	11	0
1891	54	29	25	9	0

In the 1901 census of Ireland, there are fourteen families listed in the townland.

In the 1911 census of Ireland, there are only eleven families listed in the townland.

== Antiquities ==
The chief structures of historical interest in the townland are

1. A Neolithic dual court-tomb
2. Killyran School
3. Blackwater Bridge
