= Killymoriarty =

Townland in County Cavan, Ireland

Coordinates: 54.07514°N 7.810271°W

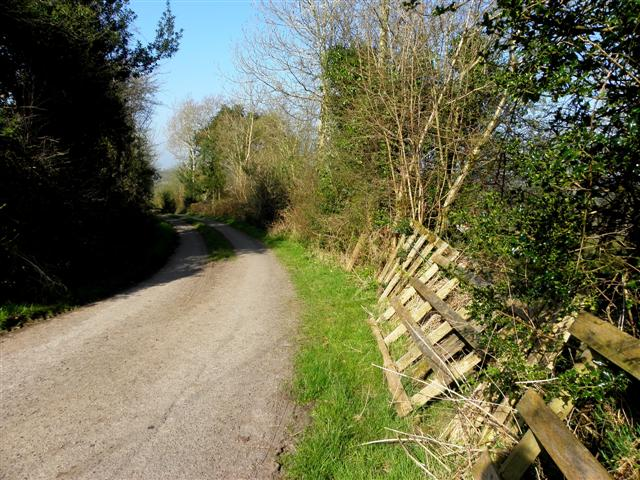
Road at Killymoriarty townland, Templeport, County Cavan, Ireland, heading north-west.

Killymoriarty (from Irish Coill Uí Mhuireartaigh, meaning 'Moriarty's Wood', local pronunciation is Kill-a-Morritty) is a townland in the civil parish of Templeport, County Cavan, Ireland. It lies in the Roman Catholic parish of Templeport and barony of Tullyhaw.

== Geography ==
Killymoriarty is bounded on the north by Ray, Templeport townland, on the west by Gortaclogher townland, on the south by Killywillin townland and on the east by Porturlan townland. Its chief geographical features are Templeport Lough, Killywillin Lough, a stream, spring wells and dug wells. Killywillin is traversed by minor roads, rural lanes and the disused Cavan and Leitrim Railway. The townland covers 161 statute acres.

== History ==
In medieval times the McGovern barony of Tullyhaw was divided into economic taxation areas called ballibetoes, from the Irish Baile Biataigh (Anglicized as 'Ballybetagh'), meaning 'A Provisioner's Town or Settlement'. The original purpose was to enable the farmer, who controlled the baile, to provide hospitality for those who needed it, such as poor people and travellers. The ballybetagh was further divided into townlands farmed by individual families who paid a tribute or tax to the head of the ballybetagh, who in turn paid a similar tribute to the clan chief. The steward of the ballybetagh would have been the secular equivalent of the erenagh in charge of church lands. There were seven ballibetoes in the parish of Templeport. Killymoriarty was located in the ballybetagh of Ballymagauran. The historical spellings of the ballybetagh are Ballymackgawran & Ballimacgawran (Irish = Baile Mhic Shamhráin = McGovern's Town).

The 1609 Baronial Map depicts the townland as Kilmuriertagh.

The Ulster Plantation grants of 1611 & 1627 spell it as Killmuriertagh and Killmoriertagh.

The 1652 Commonwealth Survey spells the name as Kilmorierty.

The 1665 Down Survey map depicts it as Killymoreat.

William Petty's 1685 map depicts it as Killneratt.

In the grants of the early 1600s, Killymoriarty was split into two poles of land, one went to the Church of Ireland and one to the McGovern family. On 25 January 1627 a grant was made of- one pole of Killmoriertagh to Thomas Groves, the Rector or Vicar of the parish of Templepurt to hold as glebe land of Templeport Church. The said Thomas Groves was the Anglican rector of Templeport parish from 1626 to 1632.

In the Plantation of Ulster by grant dated 29 April 1611, along with other lands, King James VI and I granted one poll of Killmuriertagh to the McGovern Chief, Feidhlimidh Mág Samhradháin. The townland had been part of the McGovern chief's personal demesne for several hundred years before this and it was just a Surrender and regrant confirming the existing title to the then chief. This is confirmed in a visitation by George Carew, 1st Earl of Totnes in autumn 1611 when he states that Magauran had his own land given him on this division.

An Inquisition of King Charles I of England held in Cavan town on 4 October 1626 stated that the aforesaid Phelim Magawrane died on 20 January 1622 and his lands, including one poll of Killmoriertagh, went to his son, the McGovern chief Brian Magauran who was aged 30 (born 1592) and married.

The McGovern lands in Killymoriarty were confiscated in the Cromwellian Act for the Settlement of Ireland 1652 and were distributed as follows-

The 1652 Commonwealth Survey lists the proprietor as Sargeant John Davis.

In the Hearth Money Rolls compiled on 29 September 1663 there was one Hearth Tax payer in Kilmurty- John Davies, i.e. the same person named in the 1652 survey.

A grant dated 30 January 1668 was made from King Charles II of England to the aforementioned John Davies of two cartrons in Killmoreta being 35 acres profitable and 9 acres 1 rood and 6 perches unprofitable.

A deed dated 24 February 1757 was made between William Rutledge, John Rutledge and Robert Rutledge, all of Ballymagirrell, Co. Cavan, farmers and John Johnston of Killimority, Co. Cavan, farmer regarding lands of Ballymagirrell and Greangh. Names mentioned in the Deed were George Kirkwood, Lowther Kirkwood and Andrew Hamilton of Ballymagirrell. Witnessed by Thomas Blashford of Ballymagirrell, William Johnston, the son of John Johnston and Frances Bowen of Belturbet.

The 1790 Cavan Carvaghs list spells the name as Kilmurty.

The Tithe Applotment Books for 1827 list thirteen tithepayers in the townland.

The Killymoriarty Valuation Office Field books are available for November 1839.

Griffith's Valuation of 1857 lists twenty one landholders in the townland.

== Census ==
Year	Population	Males	Females	Total Houses	Uninhabited
1841	40	19	21	7	0
1851	35	17	18	9	1
1861	50	26	24	8	0
1871	44	25	19	7	0
1881	30	17	13	5	0
1891	29	14	15	5	0

In the 1901 census of Ireland, there are six families listed in the townland, and in the 1911 census of Ireland, there are still six families listed in the townland.

== Antiquities ==
The chief structures of historical interest in the townland are:

1. A Neolithic dual court tomb.
2. A Bronze Age stone row.
3. An earthen ringfort.
