= Colonel Bryan Magauran =

Last of the Mág Samhradháin Lords

Colonel Brian Mág Samhradháin (anglicised Colonel Bryan Maguaran), head of the McGovern dynasty and Baron or Lord of Tullyhaw barony, County Cavan for a brief period at the end of the 17th century.

== Ancestry ==
His male pedigree was Bryan son of ? son of Charles Magauran son of Brian Magauran son of Feidhlimidh Mág Samhradháin (d. 1622) son of Brian son of Tomás (d. 1532) son of Maghnus (d. 1497) son of Tomás Óg (d. 1494) son of Tomás na Feasoige (d. 1458) son of Fearghal (d. 1393) son of Tomás (d. 1343) son of Brian ‘Breaghach’ Mág Samhradháin (d. 1298). Bryan was the eldest son and his younger brother was Lieutenant Daniel Magauran.

== Chieftainship ==
Brian was the last of the Mág Samhradháin lords to hold lordship. His lands had been forfeited after the Cromwellian Settlement and he lived as a tenant farmer. However, during the Williamite War in Ireland he rose in support of King James II of England when the king landed in Ireland in March 1689. The Irish Parliament declared that James remained King and passed a bill of attainder against those who supported William of Orange. The Irish Parliament also passed an Act for Liberty of Conscience that granted religious freedom to all Roman Catholics and Protestants in Ireland. As a result, the Mág Samhradháin estates in Tullyhaw were restored to Brian Mág Samhradháin.

== Battle of the Boyne ==
King James raised an army in Ireland, but was ultimately defeated at the Battle of the Boyne on 1 July 1690 against William of Orange. Bryan Magauran fought on James’s side during the battle. He was a captain in the infantry regiment of Colonel Oliver O'Gara. Bryan's brother, Daniel Magauran, was a lieutenant (later a captain) in the same regiment. O'Gara was a member of the Patriot Parliament of 1689 where he represented of Sligo County. His regiment took part in an expedition of 1689 led by Patrick Sarsfield to capture the Protestant-held town of Sligo. In 1690 O'Gara commanded the Jacobite garrison at Jamestown in County Leitrim, repulsing an advance by a larger force of Williamite troops under James Douglas. O'Gara served with his regiment at the Battle of Aughrim, which ended in Jacobite defeat. Following the Treaty of Limerick, O'Gara acted as a hostage until it was clear the terms had been honoured. It is likely that Bryan Magauran was at his side during all those events. He is later referred to as Colonel Magauran so he may have been promoted after the Boyne.

Another Mág Samhradháin was a captain in the infantry regiment of Colonel Henry FitzJames (1st Duke of Albemarle in the Jacobite peerage) under the command of Lieutenant-Colonel Thomas Corbet. His first name is not given but he was probably a relation of Brian Mág Samhradháin.

== Family and end of the Mág Samhradháin lordship ==
Mág Samhradháin’s grandson Major Edward Magauran refers to the Battle of the Boyne and its effect on the family fortunes in his autobiography wherein he states- "I was born in 1746 at the residence of the M'Gauran family, called from them Balli M’Gauran. It is a market town of some note, wherein four considerable fairs are annually held. During their prosperous days, a stately castle reared its head, adjoining to the town, and was the abode of the Barons, but it was dismantled by order of Oliver Cromwell, and now lies in ruins. My great grandfather having thus involved himself in O'Neil's rebellion, and thereby forfeited his estates, they remained in the Crown till the reign of King James the Second when they were restored to his grandson Colonel Bryan M'Gauran, for the assistance he afforded that monarch during the stand he made in Ireland against King William. The revolution which succeeded, prevented my grandfather from reaping any benefit from James's gracious intentions, and he had the mortification to see the estates which had just been granted him, bestowed by William on those who had favoured his cause. And such was his hapless fate, that bereft of his title and property, he was even obliged to become a tenant of a small part of those lands his ancestors had for many centuries been Lords of. My father succeeded my grandfather in his farm; but so inexperienced were the natives of that part of Ireland, then, in the art of agriculture; or so indolent was he, and so loath to abate of that hospitality to which he had always been accustomed, that he gave up the lease of an estate, as not being worth holding, that now brings in to its present possessor, the Earl of Tyrone, between seven and eight hundred a year".

In the same work Major Edward also refers to Bryan's brother Captain Donell Mág Samhradháin-

On my first arrival at Prague, I had given out, with truth, that I was a grandson of Colonel Bryan M'Gauran, who had followed the fortunes of James King of England, and served in his army — and as Hugh, the son of Captain Daniel M'Gauran, my great uncle, had married the lady first mentioned (Mary O'Donnell), my cousin, his son, was consequently cousin-german to the two Generals, and had always reported himself to be a grandson of Colonel Bryan M'Gauran, in order to give himself the greater consequence; it was therefore concluded that I was this gentleman's brother. He had early in life entered into the Austrian service, in which he had attained the rank of Captain; but having been taken prisoner by the Prussians, was at that time at Magdeburg. Knowing that I was nearly allied to the two Generals, though not the son of their aunt, I did not give myself the trouble to contradict the supposition.

In 1854 John O'Hara stated- Bryan Magauran was the last that held a fragment of the Ballymagauran property. His family can be traced.

| Preceded by Charles Magauran | Head of theMág Samhradháin dynasty -1690–1690- AD | Succeeded by none |
