= Derryragh =

Townland in Ballymagauran, County Cavan, Ireland

Derryragh (from Irish Doire Rátha meaning 'The Oakwood of the Fort') is a townland in the civil parish of Templeport, County Cavan, Ireland. It lies in the Roman Catholic parish of Templeport and barony of Tullyhaw. The local pronunciation is Dharraugh.

== Geography ==
Derryragh is bounded on the north by Porturlan and Killywillin townlands, on the west by Ballymagauran townland, on the south by Sruhagh and Gorteen, Templeport townlands and on the east by Camagh townland. Its chief geographical features are Ballymagauran Lough, streams, five spring wells, dug wells and forestry plantations. Derryragh is traversed by the national secondary R205 road (Ireland), minor public roads and rural lanes. The townland covers 208 statute acres.

== History ==
Although J.P. Dalton suggested that the fort on top on Derryragh hill was the centre of the worship of the pagan idol Crom Cruach, there is no evidence to support this. Kevin White carried out an archaeological survey and found no such evidence and there is no mention in the Patrician sources or in the Book of Magauran to support such a suggestion. The fact that there are five spring wells in the townland and none of them are associated with Saint Patrick, unlike others in the parish, is also a negative point. All the evidence points to the Killycluggin Stone being the Crom idol. At best the Darragh fort was an assembly or camping place for the Royal visitors on their pilgrimage to the idol. The placename may also be a corruption of 'Doire Rí' meaning "The King's Oakwood". The only tradition connected with the fort is about a fairy living there. A book published in 1912 entitled "Folk Tales of Breffny" by a Templeport author Mrs Augusta Wardell, née Hunt, under the pen name 'Bunda Hunt' gives a version of the tale which she learned it at the age of seven from an old man named Dolan. It goes as follows-

There was once a man of these parts and he had a great longing for to find a treasure. It chanced one evening that he seen a gankeynogue in the field, sitting in under a bush, and he says: "Yon lad will surely be worth a powerful weight of gold." With that he went over and caught a hold of the gankey. [According to Patrick Joyce in English as we speak it in Ireland (London 1910) Gankinna (Gancanagh) means a fairy or a leprechaun, from the Irish gann meaning small.]

"Let you discover a treasure." says he, "or else I'll keep you like a dog on a chain from this out." "Keep away!" says the gankey. "How would a poor creature like myself be finding treasure for a strong farmer!" "Let you not let on to be miserable," says the man, "for well I know it's great wealth you enjoy." "Is it me!" says the gankeynogue. "Sure I support a lengthy family entirely by my own industry." But the farmer would not believe a word of the sort. He carried the gankey to his house and put him into a big oak chest. "You'll never get out except for to show me where treasure is lodged," he allows. But the gankeynogue wasn't in notion of giving the least information. He sat up in the oak chest, hammering, shouting and singing until he had the people's heads light. All the while the farmer was determined to get the better of him and he never agreed to let him go. The lad was his tenth day in the chest when the man of the house came running in that evening, shouting at the top of his voice: "Darragh fort's on fire! Darragh fort's on fire!" With that the gankey began the most woeful lamentations, and he hammering like mad to get out of the chest. "What ails you at all?" asks the farmer. "My wife and family are in that place," says the gankey. "Let me away to bring them safe from the fire." "Will you show me a treasure?" asks the man. "Aye surely!" says the gankeynogue." "But let's go first to Darragh fort to save my weak family, and then I'll bestow the treasure." So the two started off for Darragh fort, and it not on fire at all- that was a story the man was after inventing for to scare the gankeynogue. When they landed in sight of the place the man allowed the fire to be to have burnt out. Didn't the gankey make a run and lept in among the trees. "I'm safe from you now," says he. But the man never let on to be vexed that he couldn't see the lad any more, he listened to his voice speaking for to know the direction he went. Then he lay down in that part of the fort and let on to be asleep. After a while he heard the gankeynogue telling his wife about how he was kept in the chest. "I was ten days in that place," says he. "And I full of venom against the farmer." "But it's the cunning lad I am, for I never let on where the treasure is buried at all." "Where is it!" asks the gankeynogue's wife. "Under a stone in the street before his house," says the gankey. "And herself tripped and spilled a bucket of milk just over the place this morning. I was looking out on a hole in the chest, and still never let on one word when I seen what happened." "You're a wise little fellow, sure enough," says his wife. The farmer got up and away home with him after hearing what they said. He asked herself where she spilled the milk at the morning of the day. "By that stone," says she, setting her foot on a flag in the street. He brought the loy and a crowbar for to hoke up the place, and didn't he discover a beautiful treasure of gold."

— The Gankeynogue in the Oak Chest (pp. 187–192)

The 1609 Baronial Map depicts the townland as Darreragh.

The Ulster Planation grants of 1611 & 1627 spell it as Derry and Darrerogh.

The 1665 Down Survey map depicts it as Derryreagh.

William Petty's 1685 map depicts it as Derirea.

In the grants of the early 1600s, Derryragh was split into two parts, one went to the Church of Ireland and one to O'Gowan family. On 25 January 1627 a grant was made of one-fourth of a pole of Darrerogh to Thomas Groves, the Rector or Vicar of the parish of Templepurt to hold as glebe land of Templeport Church. The said Thomas Groves was the Anglican rector of Templeport parish from 1626 to 1632.

In the Plantation of Ulster by grant dated 4 June 1611, along with other lands, King James VI and I granted one poll of Derry to Callo O'Gowne, gentleman at an annual rent of £1-12s.

The O'Gowne lands in Derryragh were confiscated in the Cromwellian Act for the Settlement of Ireland 1652 and were distributed as follows-

A grant dated 3 November 1666 was made by King Charles II of England to Sir Tristram Beresford, 1st Baronet which included, inter alia, 2 cartrons of Derriereagh containing 64 acres of profitable land and 38 acres-0 roods-16 perches of unprofitable land. By grant dated 11 September 1670 from King Charles II of England to said Sir Tristram Beresford, the said lands of Derrereagh were included in the creation of a new Manor of Beresford.

By deed dated 19 October 1749 Frederick Lawder of Ballymagauran sold his leasehold estate of six poles of the lands of Ballymagauran and a half pole in Derriereagh (which he held on lease from Marcus Beresford, 1st Earl of Tyrone) to Randal Slack, of Dublin and Lakefield, County Leitrim, gentleman, for the sum of £504-3s-3d. Slack then sold part of the estate to Arthur Ellis of Ballyheady.

In the 1761 Irish general election there was only one landowner in Derryragh registered to vote, Nicholas Neilson of Cosbystown, Inishmacsaint Parish, County Fermanagh. He was entitled to cast two votes. The four election candidates were Charles Coote, 1st Earl of Bellomont and Lord Newtownbutler (later Brinsley Butler, 2nd Earl of Lanesborough), both of whom were then elected Member of Parliament for Cavan County. The losing candidates were George Montgomery (MP) of Ballyconnell and Barry Maxwell, 1st Earl of Farnham. Absence from the poll book either meant a resident did not vote or, more likely, was not a freeholder entitled to vote, which would mean most of the inhabitants of Derryragh.

The 1790 Cavan Carvaghs list spells the name as Darraragh.

A deed dated 18 October 1814 includes lands belonging to John Mills in Darraragh.

The Tithe Applotment Books for 1827 list twenty-nine tithepayers in the townland.

The Derryragh Valuation Office Field books are available for November 1839.

Griffith's Valuation of 1857 lists thirteen landholders in the townland.

A deed dated 20 July 1865 now in the Cavan Archives Service (ref P017/0077) is described as-

Draft reconveyance of mortgage made between Francis Armstrong, esquire, of the first part, Reverend Thomas Crawford, clerk, Rector of Drumcliffe, County Sligo, and Anne Crawford otherwise Armstrong, his wife, of the second part, [Adan] Crawford, Cockspin Street, Middlesex, esquire, medical doctor, and George Kenny Sawtell, John Street, Bedford Row, London, gentleman, of the third part, Thomas Slack, esquire, and Susanna Slack, his wife, Marshwood, Newtowngore, County Cavan, of the fourth part, and John Ouseley Bansale, 1 Eldon terrace, South Circular Road, City of Dublin, esquire, and Arthur John Vesey Lindsay Birchall, esquire, Blackrock, County Leitrim, esquire, of the fifth part. Relates to reconveyance of lands secured by mortgage dated 12 July 1823. Lands affected are the six poles of Ballymcgouran otherwise Ballymagouran otherwise Ballymagauran containing around 64 acres and 3 roods; the halfpole of Derryragh otherwise Derrinagh with the subdenominations of Killywilly containing 111 acres; Cappy containing around 20 acres; and the Common containing around 4 acres and 36 perches, all in the parish of Templeport, barony of Tullyhaw, County Cavan. Principal, interest and costs on the mortgage amount to £461.10.9. Details of other relevant deeds are recited.

A folktale about Derryragh in the 1600s is viewable online.

== Census ==
Year	Population	Males	Females	Total Houses	Uninhabited
1841	81	48	33	18	0
1851	57	26	31	13	0
1861	50	27	23	10	1
1871	46	24	22	8	0
1881	40	20	20	9	1
1891	31	16	15	7	0

In the 1901 census of Ireland, there are sixteen families listed in the townland.

In the 1911 census of Ireland, there are only twelve families listed in the townland.

== Antiquities ==
1. A megalithic tomb (Site number 29 in "Archaeological Inventory of County Cavan", Patrick O'Donovan, 1995, where it is described as Situated at the base of a slope. A large slab, 1.6m long and 1.15m high, leans against an upright stone, 1.35m long and 0.85m high, at right angles to its southern end. A third slab rests against the leaning stone and to the N of the group there is a prostrate stone. Site may be largely natural in origin. (de Valera and Ó Nualláin 1972, 138, No. 5).)
2. A hilltop enclosure (Darragh Fort) (Site number 1461 in "Archaeological Inventory of County Cavan", Patrick O'Donovan, 1995, where it is described as a Large oval area (int. dims. 104m N-S; 58.8m E-W) enclosed by a low earthen bank, the outer face of which has been modified and incorporated into the field boundary. An earlier report (OPW 1969) noted a shallow depression at the internal foot of the bank from SSW-N-SSE which may indicate the presence of an internal fosse. Original entrance not recognisable. The site is traditionally associated with the pagan idol Crom Cruaich (local information). (Dalton 1921, 23-67).)
3. The site of the former National School. The Reports from the Commissioners of National Education in Ireland give the following figures for Derryragh School, Roll No. 7079:- 1854: There was one male teacher who received an annual salary of £6.8s.4d. The school had 87 pupils, 40 boys and 47 girls. 1862: The headmaster was Thomas McManus and his assistant was Catherine McManus, both Roman Catholics. There were 125 pupils, 93 Roman Catholic, 17 Church of Ireland and 1 Presbyterian. The Catechism was taught to the Catholic pupils on Saturdays from 12:30 to 1:30pm. 1874: One male teacher and one female workmistress who between them received an annual salary of £46. The school had 137 pupils, 59 boys and 78 girls. In 1890 there were 101 pupils.
4. A Lime kiln
5. A foot-stick over the stream
