= Ray, Templeport =

Townland in County Cavan, Ireland

Coordinates: 54.091°N 7.670°W

Ray (from Irish: either Ráth 'fort' or Ré 'flat land'; local pronunciation Roy) is a townland in the civil parish of Templeport, County Cavan, Ireland. It lies in the Roman Catholic parish of Templeport and barony of Tullyhaw.

== Geography ==
Ray is bounded on the north by Port, Templeport and Gortaclogher townlands, on the west by Killymoriarty townland, on the south by Porturlan and Rosehill, Templeport townlands and on the east by Cloneary townland. Its chief geographical features are Templeport Lough in the north of the townland, a small forestry plantation, stone quarries, a spring well, dug wells and a stream. Ray is traversed by minor roads, rural lanes and the disused Cavan and Leitrim Railway. The townland covers 144 statute acres.

== History ==
In medieval times the McGovern barony of Tullyhaw was divided into economic taxation areas called ballibetoes, from the Irish Baile Biataigh (Anglicized as 'Ballybetagh'), meaning 'A Provisioner's Town or Settlement'. The original purpose was to enable the farmer, who controlled the baile, to provide hospitality for those who needed it, such as poor people and travellers. The ballybetagh was further divided into townlands farmed by individual families who paid a tribute or tax to the head of the ballybetagh, who in turn paid a similar tribute to the clan chief. The steward of the ballybetagh would have been the secular equivalent of the erenagh in charge of church lands. There were seven ballibetoes in the parish of Templeport. Ray was located in the ballybetagh of Ballymagauran. The historical spellings of the ballybetagh are Ballymackgawran & Ballimacgawran (Irish = Baile Mhic Shamhráin = McGovern's Town).

In medieval times Ray formed part of the modern townland of Porturlan, together with other subdivisions called Killcroghan (from Irish either Cill Cruachán or Coill Cruachán meaning 'The Wood of the Round Hill' or "The Church of the Round Hill") and Alico.

The 1609 Baronial Map depicts the townland as Kilcrooghan.

The 1652 Commonwealth Survey spells the name as Rahy.

The 1665 Down Survey map depicts it as Roght.

William Petty's 1685 map depicts it as Roght.

Ray's history up to the Cromwellian Act for the Settlement of Ireland 1652 is described under Porturlan.

The 1652 Commonwealth Survey lists the proprietor as William Chambers.

In the Hearth Money Rolls compiled on 29 September 1663 there were two people paying the Hearth Tax in Raye- William Chambers and Hugh McBrine.

A grant dated 30 January 1668 was made from King Charles II of England to William Chambers for 33 acres in Ray alias Rath. A grant dated 7 July 1669 was made from King Charles II of England to John, Lord Viscount Massareene, for, inter alia, 35 acres profitable and 56 acres and 37 perches unprofitable in Alico.

In the Templeport Poll Book of 1761 there were only four people registered to vote in Ray in the 1761 Irish general election - Thomas Chambers, William Finlay, John Johnston and Brochwell Lawrence. Only Chambers and Finlay lived in Ray whereas Johnston and Lawrence lived in Ballymagirril and Killynaher in Drumlane parish respectively but owned freeholds in Ray. They were all entitled to two votes each. Johnston voted for Lord Newtownbutler (later Brinsley Butler, 2nd Earl of Lanesborough) and for Charles Coote, 1st Earl of Bellomont, who were both elected Member of Parliament for Cavan County. The other three voted for Coote and for George Montgomery (MP) of Ballyconnell, who lost the election. Absence from the poll book either meant a resident did not vote or more likely was not a freeholder entitled to vote, which would mean most of the inhabitants of Ray.

The Tithe Applotment Books (which spell it as Roy) for 1827 list nine tithepayers in the townland.

In 1833 three people in Ray were registered as a keeper of weapons- William Bennett, Charles Bennett and Robert Eamo.

The Ray Valuation Office Field books are available for 1839–1840.

A rental of the tenants on the Thornton estate in Ray dated 1843 is held in The County Cavan Archives (No. P016/005)

Griffith's Valuation of 1857 lists five landholders in the townland.

On 5 July 1870 Ray townland was listed for sale as part of the Beresford Estate.

== Census ==
Year	Population	Males	Females	Total Houses	Uninhabited
1841	25	14	11	4	0
1851	22	11	11	5	1
1861	31	15	16	4	0
1871	28	13	15	4	0
1881	27	15	12	4	0
1891	21	13	8	23	0

In the 1901 census of Ireland, there are five families listed in the townland, and in the 1911 census of Ireland, there are only four families listed in the townland.

== Antiquities ==
The chief structures of historical interest in the townland are:

1. An earthen ringfort.
2. A limekiln
3. A footbridge over the stream
4. A flanged bronze axehead found on the surface of a field during digging
5. According to the story The Floating Stone of Inch Island (now found in the 1938 Dúchas Folklore Collection), a cursing stone connected to the birth of Saint Máedóc of Ferns or Mogue was buried in Ray townland in the 1880s and is probably still there.
