= Killyran =

Townland in the civil parish of Templeport, County Cavan, Ireland

Coordinates: 54.07514°N 7.810271°W

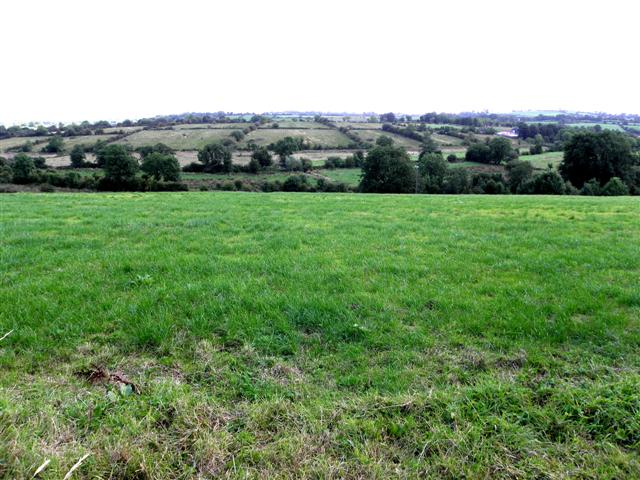
Killyran townland, Templeport, County Cavan, Ireland, looking east.

Killyran (either from Irish Coille Reanna, meaning 'Wood of the Division' or from Irish Coill an Raithin, meaning 'Wood of the Fern') is a townland in the civil parish of Templeport, County Cavan, Ireland. It lies in the Roman Catholic parish of Templeport and barony of Tullyhaw.

== Geography ==
Killyran is bounded on the north by Boley and Gortaclogher townlands, on the west by Glebe and Drumreilly townlands in County Leitrim, on the south by Kilnacreevy townland in County Leitrim and on the east by Ballymagauran and Killywillin townlands. Its chief geographical features are Glebe Lough, Killyran Big Lough, Killyran Little Lough, the River Blackwater, County Cavan, a stream, spring wells and dug wells. Killywillin is traversed by minor roads, rural lanes and the disused Cavan and Leitrim Railway. The townland covers 330 statute acres.

== History ==
Up until the 18th century Killyran formed part of the modern townland of Ballymagauran and its history is the same until then.

A deed by Arthur Ellis dated 19 Mar 1768 includes the lands of Killyron.

A deed by Gore Ellis dated 24 Feb 1776 includes the lands of Killyran.

The 1790 Cavan Carvaghs list spells the name as Kilran.

In the 1825 Registry of Freeholders for County Cavan there was one freeholder registered with a freehold in Killeran, although he lived in Ballymagauran- John Brooke. He was a Forty-shilling freeholders holding a lease for lives from his landlord, Lord John Beresford, the Archbishop of Armagh (Church of Ireland).

The Tithe Applotment Books for 1827 list thirteen tithepayers in the townland.

The Killyran Valuation Office Field books are available for 1839-1840.

Griffith's Valuation of 1857 lists twenty four landholders in the townland.

In the Dúchas Folklore Collection is a description of Killyran in 1938 by Edna Gerty.

A book about life in Killyran from 1929 to 1947, Water under the Railway Bridge by Bill Gerty, is viewable online.

Killyran National school was actually located in the townland of Boley, Templeport, not in Killyran.

== Census ==
Year	Population	Males	Females	Total Houses	Uninhabited
1841	113	49	64	17	0
1851	112	51	61	17	1
1861	93	44	49	19	4
1871	87	43	44	14	0
1881	86	44	42	16	1
1891	74	39	35	15	1

In the 1901 census of Ireland, there are eighteen families listed in the townland, and in the 1911 census of Ireland, there are only seventeen families listed in the townland.

== Antiquities ==
The chief structures of historical interest in the townland are:

1. Killyran Bridge
2. Killyran Railway Station on the disused Cavan and Leitrim Railway.
