= Gorteen, Templeport =

Townland in County Cavan, Ireland

Coordinates: 54.07514°N 7.810271°W

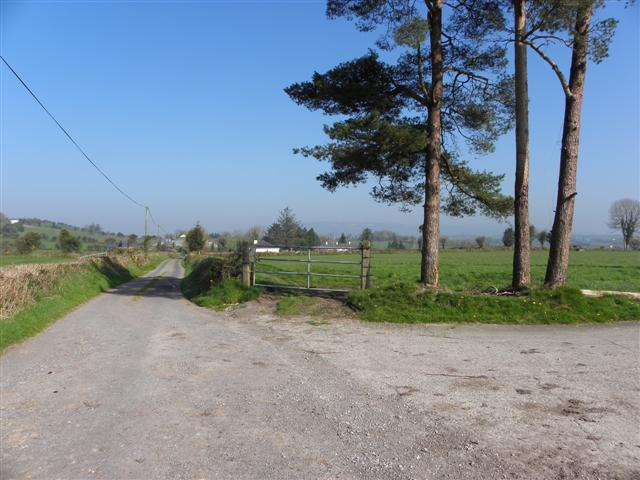
Road at Gorteen townland, Templeport, County Cavan, heading north.

Gorteen (from Irish Gortín meaning 'A small cultivated field or garden') is a townland in the civil parish of Templeport, County Cavan, Ireland. It lies in the Roman Catholic parish of Templeport and barony of Tullyhaw.

== Geography ==
Gorteen is bounded on the north by Camagh townland, on the west by Derryragh and Sruhagh townlands, on the southeast by Derrycassan townland. It is traversed by minor roads and rural lanes. The townland covers 104 statute acres.

== History ==
In medieval times the McGovern barony of Tullyhaw was divided into economic taxation areas called ballibetoes, from the Irish Baile Biataigh (Anglicized as 'Ballybetagh'), meaning 'A Provisioner's Town or Settlement'. The original purpose was to enable the farmer, who controlled the baile, to provide hospitality for those who needed it, such as poor people and travellers. The ballybetagh was further divided into townlands farmed by individual families who paid a tribute or tax to the head of the ballybetagh, who in turn paid a similar tribute to the clan chief. The steward of the ballybetagh would have been the secular equivalent of the erenagh in charge of church lands. There were seven ballibetoes in the parish of Templeport. Gorteen was located in the ballybetagh of Ballymagauran. The historical spellings of the ballybetagh are Ballymackgawran & Ballimacgawran (Irish = Baile Mhic Shamhráin = McGovern's Town).

Until the 19th century, Gorteen formed part of the modern townland of Camagh as a subdivision, so its history is the same as Camagh until then.

The Tithe Applotment Books for 1827 list twelve tithepayers in the townland.

The Gorteen Valuation Office Field books are available for November 1839.

In 1841 the population of the townland was 40, being 24 males and 16 females. There were seven houses in the townland, all of which were inhabited.

In 1851 the population of the townland was 39, being 23 males and 16 females, the reduction being due to the Great Famine (Ireland). There were six houses in the townland, all were inhabited.

Griffith's Valuation of 1857 lists eight landholders in the townland.

The 1861 Census states there were 7 houses in the townland with a total population of 29, 13 males and 16 females.

The 1871 Census states there were 7 houses in the townland with a total population of 32 people.

The 1881 Census states there were 7 houses in the townland with a total population of 36 people.

The 1891 Census states there were 7 houses in the townland with a total population of 31 people, of whom 18 were males and 13 females.

In the 1901 census of Ireland, there are ten families listed in the townland, and in the 1911 census of Ireland, there are only eight families listed in the townland.

== Antiquities ==
There are no known historic monuments in the townland.
