= Ballymagauran =

Village in County Cavan, Ireland

Ballymagauran Baile Mhic Shamhráin
- Hamlet
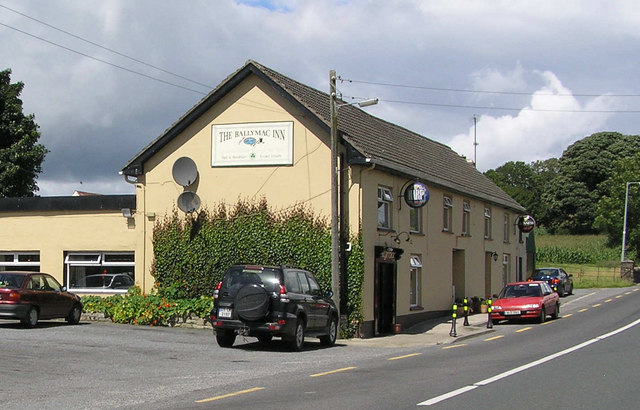
- The Ballymac Inn, Ballymagauran

- Location in Ireland
- Coordinates: 54.068°N 7.682°W
- Country: Ireland
- Province: Ulster
- County: County Cavan
- Barony: Tullyhaw
- Elevation: 78 m (256 ft)
- Irish Grid Reference: H209134

Ballymagauran (Irish: Baile Mhic Shamhráin, meaning 'town of Mac Shamhráin'), historically known in English as Ballymagowran and also sometimes spelled Ballymacgovern or Ballymagovern, is a hamlet and townland in the west of County Cavan in Ireland. It lies on the border with County Leitrim, lying within both the civil parish of Templeport and the historical barony of Tullyhaw. Ballymagauran is located at the southern end of the barony of Tullyhaw on the R205 road between Ballinamore and Ballyconnell.

== Medieval history ==
In medieval times, the Mac Shamhráin (anglicised as McGovern or Magauran) túath of Teallach Eachdhach (Tullyhaw), then part of West Bréifne in Connacht, was divided into economic taxation areas called ballibetoes, from the Irish Baile Biataigh (anglicised as 'Ballybetagh'), meaning 'A Provisioner's Town or Settlement' (Tullyhaw is now a barony in County Cavan). The original purpose of a ballybetagh was to enable the farmer, who controlled the baile, to provide hospitality for those who needed it, such as poor people and travellers. The ballybetagh was further divided into townlands farmed by individual families who paid a tribute or tax to the head of the ballybetagh, who in turn paid a similar tribute to the clan chief. The steward of the ballybetagh would have been the secular equivalent of the erenagh in charge of church lands. There were seven ballibetoes in the parish of Templeport. Ballymagauran was located in the ballybetagh named after it. The historical spellings of the ballybetagh are Ballymackgawran & Ballimacgawran (Irish = Baile Mhic Shamhráin = McGovern's Town or Magauran's Town).

After 1400 A.D., Ballymagauran became the chief seat of the Mac Shamhráin (McGovern or Magauran) clan, who were the lords of Teallach Eachdhach (Tullyhaw). Their previous seats were in Coologe and Killywillin. A medieval Duanaire or Poembook belonging to them is the oldest such surviving book in Ireland and describes various incidents at Ballymagauran. The Vikings may also have been in the area as the pommel of an inlaid Viking sword (Petersen Type H) dating from c. 900 A.D. has been excavated from a fort on the shore of Ballymagauran Lake.

The earliest surviving mention of the placename is in the Annals of the Four Masters under the year 1431 A.D., which states that Thomas, proceeded with a great host into Teallach Eachdhach, to take vengeance on the inhabitants for the death of his kinsman. He plundered, spoiled, and ravaged the territory, and slew many of the chiefs of it. He also burned Ballymagauran, and then he returned home in triumph.

In 1455, the Annals state that a war broke out between Philip, the son of Thomas Maguire, heir to the lordship of Fermanagh, and Magauran. Philip pitched his camp at Beann-Eachlabhra and Brian and Tuathal, Philip's sons, went forth with twelve horsemen and thirty-seven infantry, burned Magauran's town (Ballymagauran), and the greater part of his territory, and killed Melaghlin Duv Magauran and a great number of his people; after which he returned home triumphantly.

In 1459, the village was burnt down by Thomas Oge Maguire, after seizing the area. The Annals of the Four Masters state- The spoils of Magh Slecht were seized on by Maguire (Thomas Oge); and Ballymagauran was burned by him on this occasion.

It was burnt again on Tuesday 27 September 1485 by Turlough O'Reilly, son of John. On the following day Magauran with his kinsmen, went in pursuit of the army, and deprived them of sixteen men, who were killed or taken prisoners, and two hundred horses.

On 28 September 1498, Ballymagauran was raided by the Maguire clan.

The Annals of Ulster for 1498 state-

Philip, son of Toirdelbach, son of Philip Mag Uidhir, went on an inroad into Tellach-Eathach (Tullyhaw) and the sons of Edmond Mag Uidhir and the sons of Gilla-Padraig Mag Uidhir went with him thither and the country was traversed by them to Snam-na-neach. And the town of Mag Samradhain (Ballymagauran) was burned by them and they turned back and came not on cattle-spoils or chattels. And the worthies of the country overtook them on that retreat with a very large pursuing party and those nobles turned on the pursuing party and defeated them spiritedly, successfully then and slew three and twenty of the pursuing party in that rout, two sons of Aedh, son of Eogan Mag Samradhain, namely, Tadhg and Maghnus (that is, the cleric). And the other portion of them slain were of the Clann-Imair and of the Clan of Mac-in-taisigh and of the muster of Tellach-Eathach also. And there was slain also by the Fir-Manach in the heat of that rout Flaithbertach, son of Donn, son of Edmond Mag Uidhir. And on the vigil of Michaelmas precisely those deeds were done.

In 1512, the Annals of the Four Masters state- Philip, the son of Turlough Maguire and Thomas, son of Manus Magauran went to Teallach Eachdhach and killed Turlough. They then proceeded to the Crannog of Magauran and took Magauran prisoner, only to set him free and leave him behind as he had become sick, making transport inconvenient. The son of O'Reilly, Edmond Roe then came up with these men of Fermanagh, and with the son recte grandsons of Manus, defeated them, and slew Donough, the son of Redmond, son of Philip Maguire; Philip, the son of Owen, son of Donnell Ballagh Maguire; Hugh, the son of Owen, son of Turlough Maguire; Murtough Roe, son of Murrough; and James, the son of Magrath Maguire, besides many others; and many horses were taken from them on that day.

On 19 January 1586, Queen Elizabeth I of England granted a pardon to Thomas oge m'Brien m'Thomas Magawran, of Magawranstowne, for fighting against the Queen's forces.

=== 17th century ===
Ballymagauran, along with the rest of Tullyhaw, was transferred from County Leitrim in Connacht to County Cavan in Ulster in the early seventeenth century. At the start of the Plantation of Ulster in 1609, the lands of the McGoverns were confiscated, but some were later regranted to them. The Manor of Ballymagauran was regranted to the chief of the clan, Feidhlimidh Mág Samhradháin (anglicised as Phelim Magauran, Phelim McGovern or Phelim Magawrane), on 29 April 1611. It seems that it was Feidhlimidh who had Ballymagauran 'Castle' constructed at this time, probably at the start of the Plantation of Ulster. His 'castle' was in reality a modest, stone-built fortified house. The modern townland of Killyran formed part of Ballymagauran until the 18th century. The name of the townland in which Ballymagauran village was situated was called Drumcorke or Drumhirk at that time and was only renamed as Ballymagauran in the Ordnance Survey of 1836. The grant to Felim McGovern included Dromcorcke, 1 poll. In a visitation by Lord Carew in autumn 1611 he states that Magauran had his own land given him on this division.

By 1613, Magauran had progressed with building work. Sir Josias Bodley reported on 6 February 1613-Proportion No. 31: 1,000 acres. Magauran is strongly seated, and near to his Irish house by a lough's side hath begun an English building of lime and stone of 40 feet long and 20 broad, not yet raised above the first story, but with this season intendeth to set it forward: There is round about it a trench and dike of earth and sod, which with little labour may be made of good strength, and that, it seemeth, by his beginning, he hath a purpose to do.

By 1619, Pynnar's Survey of Land Holders found that Magauran had built a castle on his holdings. A survey taken in August 1622 stated that- Brian Magauran hath 1,000 acres in which is a bawn of sodds and within it a stone howse thatched, with chymneys and a part of it lofted. He setts his land from yeare to yeare to ye Irish, who plowgh by ye taile. An Inquisition ordered by King Charles I of England, held in Cavan Town on 4 October 1626, stated that the aforesaid Feidhlimidh Mág Samhradháin (Phelim Magawrane or Phelim Magauran) died on 20 January 1622 and his lands, including two polls of Dromcorck, went to his son, the McGovern chief Brian Magauran, who was aged 30 (born 1592) and married. Brian was married to Mary O'Brien and he died in 1631 leaving the estate to his son and heir Edward Magauran, who was born in 1616.

The 'castle' that Feidhlimidh Mág Samhradháin erected after 1611 was supposedly besieged and destroyed by Oliver Cromwell's army in 1649. After the Irish Rebellion, Ballymagauran was confiscated from the Magaurans and was distributed to the English settlers as follows.-

The 1652 Commonwealth Survey lists the townland as Dromcorchae and the proprietor as Ensigne Walter Reece. Sir William Petty's Down Survey map of 1659 shows the castle in the townland of Dromkirke with inscription "Stone house in repair". In the Hearth Money Rolls of 1663 there were only three houses in Templeport with two hearths, at- Lissanover, Munlough and Sruagh, indicating that the castle had been abandoned by that time.

In the Hearth Money Rolls compiled on 29 September 1663, there was one Hearth Tax payer in Ballimagowran – John Forman.

A grant dated 3 November 1666 was made by King Charles II of England to Sir Tristram Beresford, 1st Baronet, which included, inter alia, the lands of Ballymagowran alias Drumherk comprising 121 acres. On 11 September 1670, King Charles II created the 'Manor of Beresford' out of lands in Tullyhaw which Beresford acquired, including Ballymagowran alias Drumherke, at a rent of £0-6s–8d per annum for each fair & market held there. Beresford died on 15 January 1673 and was succeeded by his son, Sir Randal Beresford.

=== After 1700 ===
Major Edward Magauran was born in Ballymagauran on 16 April 1746, the grandson of Colonel Bryan Magauran, the Chief of the Clan McGovern who fought at the Battle of the Boyne for King James II against King William III ('William of Orange'). In his autobiography he states: I was born in 1746 at the residence of the M'Gauran family, called from them Balli M’Gauran. It is a market town of some note, wherein four considerable fairs are annually held. During their prosperous days, a stately castle reared its head, adjoining to the town, and was the abode of the Barons, but it was dismantled by order of Oliver Cromwell, and now lies in ruins.

The ruined castle is described and pictured as 'Site No.1846, Tower House, Ballymagauran townland' in the Archaeological Inventory of County Cavan, where it is described as- Remains of rectangular building (int. dims. 9.5m E-W; 5.9m N-S) of rough, uncoursed limestone masonry. Plain splayed window in W end of S wall. Fireplace and chimney in E end of S wall. The structure was apparently two stories in height. Lying on the ground is half of the doorway arch. Dressed stone indicates a late 16th or early 17th-century date. Remains of a largely destroyed stone head at NW angle. Davies (1947a, 94-5) recorded that this 'although barbarously mutilated in recent years, looks from the grooves under the chin to have been a grotesque of a type not likely to have been made after 1600'. (Wilsdon 2010, 184–6)" and in "The Castles of County Cavan", page 94. An earthen ringfort in the townland may have been the previous residence before the castle was built (Site No. 243 in aforesaid Inventory book, where it is described as- Raised circular area (int. diam. 18.2m) enclosed by a very low earthen bank and vague traces of a fosse identifiable only from SW-W-N. An earlier report (OPW 1969) suggested that the original entrance may have been at SSE).

By deed dated 19 October 1749, Frederick Lawder of Ballymagauran sold his leasehold estate of six poles of the lands of Ballymagauran and a half pole in Derryragh (which he held on lease from the 1st Earl of Tyrone (by the third creation)) to Randal Slack, of Dublin and Lakefield, County Leitrim, gentleman, for the sum of £504-3s–3d. Slack then sold part of the estate to Arthur Ellis of Ballyheady. A deed dated 27 October 1750, now in the Cavan Archives Service (ref P017/0014), is described as-

Document which relates to the division of the lands of Ballymagauran between Randal Slack and Arthur Ellis. Ballymagauran was divided into two sections, one westward and the other eastward of the great road. Lots were cast to decide who was to acquire which section. Ellis won the casting of lots and chose the eastward division. In consideration of the privilege of choice, Ellis paid £10 to Slack, over and above half of the rents, fees and duties payable to the Early of Tyrone and subject to Slack's agreement made with Frederick Lawder. On verso of document is information relating to the rental and use of land in the two sections of Ballymagauran with the names of land occupiers present.

Administration of Slack's will, dated 23 March 1763, was granted to his widow Anne after his death.

In the Templeport Poll Book of 1761, there were six voters in Ballymagaveran in the 1761 Irish general election – Michael Banagher who lived in Corran but who also had a freehold in Ballymagauran; Thomas Blashford who lived in Ballymagauran but who also owned a freehold in Lissanover; Edward Ellis, Thomas Finlay, William Johnston and James Thompson, who all lived in Ballymagauran. Randall Slack of Larkfield, County Leitrim, was also entitled to vote. They were each entitled to cast two votes. The four election candidates were: Charles Coote (who later succeeded, in 1766, as the 5th Baron Coote and who was later created, in 1767, the 1st Earl of Bellomont (by the third creation)) and Lord Newtown-Butler (who later succeeded as the 2nd Earl of Lanesborough), both of whom were then elected to the Irish Parliament as a Member of Parliament (MP) for Cavan County. The losing candidates were: George Montgomery of Ballyconnell and The Hon. Barry Maxwell (who later succeeded, in 1779, as the 3rd Baron Farnham and who was later created the 1st Earl of Farnham). Banagher, Finlay and Johnston all voted for Coote and Maxwell. Blashford voted for Lord Newtown-Butler and Coote. Ellis voted for Newtown-Butler and Montgomery. Thompson voted for Coote and Montgomery. Absence from the poll book either meant a resident did not vote or, more likely, was not a freeholder entitled to vote, which would mean most of the inhabitants of Ballymagauran.

A deed by Arthur Ellis dated 19 Mar 1768 includes the lands of Ballymagauran.

A deed by Gore Ellis dated 24 Feb 1776 includes the lands of Ballymagauran.

In the book Alwyn: or the gentleman comedian written in 1780 by Thomas Holcroft, a character therein states- You know I had £500 left me by my old aunt Phabe Tullaghan of Ballimagowran in the county of Cavan, and the province of Ulster, about two years before her death.

In the Fermanagh Poll of Electors 1788, there was one Ballymagauran resident, Edward Ellis, who was entitled to vote as he owned land in Drumreask townland in Inishmacsaint parish.

The 1790 Cavan Carvaghs list spells the village name as Ballemagawran.

In 1810, Nicholas Carlisle stated that Ballymagauran, in the Barony of Tullaghagh, Co. of CAVAN, and Province of Ulster. It is 4 in. N. E. from Ballynamore. The Fairs are holden on the 23d of May, 12 August, and 23d of November.

A deed dated 18 October 1814 includes lands belonging to John Mills in Ballymagauran.

The Newry Magazine for 1816 reported that- Some time ago, a young man, we lament to state, was killed, leaving the town of Ballymagaurin, in the county of Cavan. During the day some persons had manifested a disposition to violence and riot, and a desperate quarrel ensued, in which, however, the unfortunate victim, we learn, took no part or concern. On his way out of the fair he was attacked, and beaten so inhumanly that he survived but a short time.

The 1821 Census of Ireland states that the population of the village was 195.

In the 1825 Registry of Freeholders for County Cavan there were three freeholders registered in Ballymagauran- John Brooke, Thomas Finley and Fred M'Dermott. They were all Forty-shilling freeholders holding a lease for lives from their landlords. Brooke's freehold was in Killyran and his landlord was Lord John Beresford, the Church of Ireland Archbishop of Armagh. Finley's landlord was Arthur Ellis and M'Dermott's landlord was Thomas Slack.

The Tithe Applotment Books for 1827 list the following tithepayers in the townland- Alexton, Stocks, Brookes, Dermott, Donachy, Hunnan, McGauran, Reynolds, Whelan, Collins, Roycroft, Costello.

In the early nineteenth century, a Sunday school was kept in the townland, funded by the Hibernian Sunday School Society.

The 1831 Census of Ireland states that there were 20 houses in the village, of which 3 were unoccupied. The population was 89, of which 38 were males and 51 females, so the population had dropped by 106 since 1821. The occupations were 3 female servants, 3 male servants, 3 retailers or craftsmen, 5 agricultural labourers, 7 farmers.

In 1833, two people in Ballymagauran were registered as a keeper of weapons- Farrell Kiernan and David Veitch.

The Ordnance Survey Namebooks for 1836 state- The small village of Ballymaguaran is situated near the centre of the townland...also the ruins of an old building said to have been a distillery.

The Ballymagauran Valuation Office Field books are available for 1839–1840.

In 1840, Samuel Lewis described it as Ballymagauran, a village, in the parish of TEMPLEPORT, barony of TALLAGHAGH, county of CAVAN, and province of ULSTER, 4 miles (N. E.) from Ballinamore, on the road to Killesandra; containing 20 houses and 89 inhabitants. Fairs are held on 23 May 12 Aug., and 23 Nov., of which the last is a good fair for cattle. Some remains of the old castle, which was destroyed by Cromwell, yet exist.

In 1841 the population of the townland was 166, being 73 males and 93 females. There were thirty-one houses in the townland, all of which were inhabited.

The Parliamentary Gazetteer of Ireland for 1845 noted that Ballymagauran was A hamlet in the parish of Templeport, barony of Tullaghagh. Co.Cavan, Ulster and that It stands on the western frontier of the county, four miles north-east of Ballinamore. Fairs are held on 23 May 12 Aug and Nov.23. Population in 1831 was 89.

In 1851 the population of the townland was 126, being 66 males and 60 females, the reduction being due to the Great Famine (Ireland). There were twenty-five houses in the townland, of which one was uninhabited.

Griffith's Valuation of 1857 lists thirty-six landholders in the townland.

In 1861 the population of the townland was 143, being 70 males and 73 females. There were twenty-seven houses in the townland and all were inhabited.

A deed dated 20 July 1865, now in the Cavan Archives Service (ref P017/0077), is described as-

Draft reconveyance of mortgage made between Francis Armstrong, esquire, of the first part, Reverend Thomas Crawford, clerk, Rector of Drumcliffe, County Sligo, and Anne Crawford otherwise Armstrong, his wife, of the second part, [Adan] Crawford, Cockspin Street, Middlesex, esquire, medical doctor, and George Kenny Sawtell, John Street, Bedford Row, London, gentleman, of the third part, Thomas Slack, esquire, and Susanna Slack, his wife, Marshwood, Newtowngore, County Cavan, of the fourth part, and John Ouseley Bansale, 1 Eldon terrace, South Circular Road, City of Dublin, esquire, and Arthur John Vesey Lindsay Birchall, esquire, Blackrock, County Leitrim, esquire, of the fifth part. Relates to reconveyance of lands secured by mortgage dated 12 July 1823. Lands affected are the six poles of Ballymcgouran otherwise Ballymagouran otherwise Ballymagauran containing around 64 acres and 3 roods; the halfpole of Derryragh otherwise Derrinagh with the subdenominations of Killywilly containing 111 acres; Cappy containing around 20 acres; and the Common containing around 4 acres and 36 perches, all in the parish of Templeport, barony of Tullyhaw, County Cavan. Principal, interest and costs on the mortgage amount to £461.10.9. Details of other relevant deeds are recited.

In 1871 the population of the townland was 115, being 45 males and 70 females. There were twenty-five houses in the townland, of which one was uninhabited.

In 1881 the population of the townland was 95, being 41 males and 54 females. There were twenty houses in the townland, all were inhabited.

In 1891 the population of the townland was 77, being 39 males and 38 females. There were eighteen houses in the townland, of which three were uninhabited.

In the 1901 census of Ireland, there are nineteen families listed in the townland.

In the 1911 census of Ireland, there are twenty-one families listed in the townland.

In the Dúchas Schools' Collection there is a description of Ballymagauran in 1938 by Mrs Cosgrove.

=== School ===
The Second Report from the Commissioners of Irish Education Inquiry dated 1826 stated that James Lynch, a Catholic, was the headmaster of the pay school, charging a fee of £5 per annum. The schoolhouse was built of stone and lime to hold 26 boys and 13 girls, all of whom were Roman Catholics. It closed before 1900.

== See also ==
- McGovern (name)
- Feidhlimidh Mág Samhradháin
