= Feidhlimidh Mág Samhradháin =

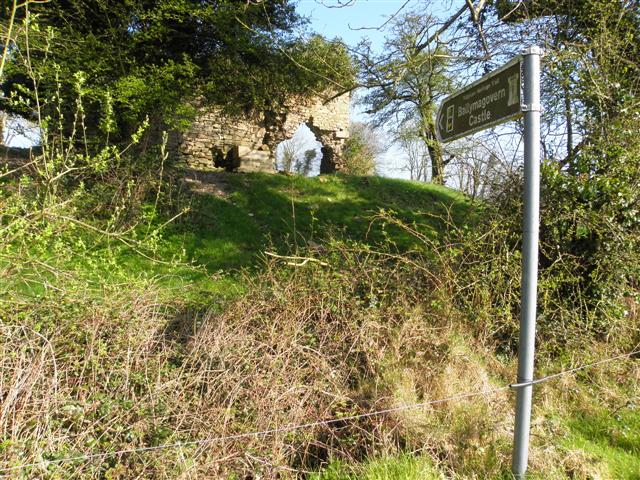
The ruins of Ballymagauran Castle destroyed by Oliver Cromwell in 1649, Templeport parish, County Cavan, Ireland.

Feidhlimidh Mág Samhradháin, the Second, (anglicised Felim or Phelim McGovern) d. 20 January 1622, was head of the McGovern dynasty and Baron or Lord of Tullyhaw barony, County Cavan from before 1611 until his death on 20 January 1622.

== Ancestry ==
His male pedigree was Feidhlimidh son of Brian son of Tomás (died 1532) son of Maghnus (died 1497) son of Tomás Óg (died 1494) son of Tomás na Feasoige (died 1458) son of Fearghal (died 1393) son of Tomás (died 1343) son of Brian 'Breaghach' Mág Samhradháin (died 1298). He was the third eldest son and had two brothers who preceded him as head, Tomas Óg Mág Samhradháin and Brian Óg Mág Samhradháin, together with a third brother Emonn of Lissanover.

== Elizabethan Fiants ==
Mág Samhradháin first comes to notice on 19 January 1586 when Queen Elizabeth I granted a pardon to Phelim m'Brien m'Thomas Magawran, of Colleaghe, for fighting against the Queen's forces.

== Jacobean Fiants ==
On 30 April 1605 King James VI and I granted a further pardon to him as Phelim McGaran of Tolaghagh, for fighting against the King's forces.

== Coologe Castle ==
Mág Samhradháin's castle was formerly in the townland of Coologe, now in the parish of Templeport, County Cavan. An earthen ringfort now on the shore of Coologe Lough is probably the site of the castle. Poem 1 by Giolla Pádraig mac Naimhin in the Book of Magauran describes what the castle looked like about 1290 A.D. It is described as a strong compact stout castle with interior walls of white hazel-wood which were covered with satin and tapestries. Along the wall were weapon racks with blued-iron spears, javelins and bridles. The door of the castle was ribbed in gold. The palisade outside was bright with berries. In the feast-hall were poets, musicians with harps, a hundred warriors and hounds held by gold-linked chains. The guests drank wine from gem-encrusted gold goblets. The castle was burned on 3 May 1298 in an attack by the clan Muircheartaigh Uí Conchobhair (O'Connor). The Annals of Connacht for 1298 state- Brian Bregach Mag Samradain, chieftain of Tullyhaw, the most generous and valorous man of his time, was killed by Aed Brefnech O Conchobair and the Clan Murtagh in his own house at Coologe on the third day of summer. Sometime about 1400 the chief's castle moved to Ballymagauran townland and Coologe Castle was given to the Tánaiste of the clan, which office Feidhlimidh held in 1586. Tánaiste was the Irish word for the heir of the chief (taoiseach), under the Gaelic system of tanistry.

== Lordship ==
On the death of his brother Tomas Óg Mág Samhradháin, sometime after 1586, Feidhlimidh became head of the Mág Samhradháin dynasty and moved from his home in Coologe to the chief's residence in Ballymagauran. About 1602 the poet Aonghus Ruadh na nAor Ó Dálaigh was employed by the Lord Deputy of Ireland, Charles Blount, 8th Baron Mountjoy to go around among the remaining Gaelic lords and satirise them on their fallen estate in order to instigate enmity among them. Few of these were then able to maintain a poet in their household and O'Daly was glad to have a job from anyone. However he later paid for his insolence by being assassinated. His satire on the Mág Samhradháin dynasty was-

The race of Samhradhan of small Boolies' [dairies].

And they all with little food;

A horde to whom the music of the fly is sweet;

A shamrock is in the mouth of every one of them.

== Plantation of Ulster ==
In the Plantation of Ulster by grant dated 29 April 1611, King James VI and I granted the modern day townlands of Ballymagauran, Ballymagirril, Boley, Templeport, Camagh, Derrycassan, Gortaclogher, Gortnaleck, Killymoriarty, Killywillin, Porturlan and Sruhagh, to Phelim Magawran, but it is probable that the lands had been in possession of the Mág Samhradháin dynasty for several hundred years before this and it was just a Surrender and regrant confirming the existing title to the McGoverns.

== Ballymagauran Castle ==
Under the terms of the Ulster Plantation grant, Feidhlimidh was obliged to build a new castle in Ballymagauran. In a visitation by Lord Carew in autumn 1611 he states that "Magauran had his own land given him on this division". By 1613, Feidhlimidh Mág Samhradháin had progressed with building work. Sir Josias Bodley reported on 6 February 1613-"Proportion No. 31: 1,000 acres. Magauran is strongly seated, and near to his Irish house by a lough's side hath begun an English building of lime and stone of 40 feet long and 20 broad, not yet raised above the first story, but with this season intendeth to set it forward: There is round about it a trench and dike of earth and sod, which with little labour may be made of good strength, and that, it seemeth, by his beginning, he hath a purpose to do."

By 1619 Pynnar's Survey of Land Holders found that Mág Samhradháin had built a castle on his holdings.

== Family and death ==
Feidhlimidh Mág Samhradháin had at least two sons, Brian Magauran and Giolla na Naomh Magauran.

An Inquisition of King Charles I of England held in Cavan town on 4 October 1626 stated that the aforesaid Phelim Magawrane died on 20 January 1622 and his lands went to his son Brian who succeeded him as head of the lineage. Brian was aged thirty (born 1592) and married Mary O'Brien. According to local tradition Feidhlimidh is buried on Inch Island in Templeport Lough.

A survey taken at Ballymagauran in August 1622 stated that- "Brian Magauran hath 1,000 acres in which is a bawn of sodds and within it a stone howse thatched, with chymneys and a part of it lofted. He setts his land from yeare to yeare to ye Irish, who plowgh by ye taile."

The castle that Mág Samhradháin erected after 1611 was besieged and destroyed by Oliver Cromwell's army in 1649. Sir William Petty's Down Survey map of 1659 shows the castle in the townland of Dromkirke with inscription "Stone house in repair".

Preceded by Tomas Óg Mág Samhradháin	Chief of McGovern clan 16??–1622 AD	Succeeded by Brian Magauran
