= Brian Magauran =

Irish chief (1592–c.1628)

Brian Magauran, the Fourth, b.1592 was chief of the McGovern Clan and Baron or Lord of Tullyhaw barony, County Cavan from 1622 until his death some time after 1628.

== Ancestry ==
His ancestry was Brian son of Feidhlimidh Mág Samhradháin (d. 1622) son of Brian son of Tomás (d. 1532) son of Maghnus (d. 1497) son of Tomás Óg (d. 1494) son of Tomás na Feasoige (d. 1458) son of Fearghal (d. 1393) son of Tomás (d. 1343) son of Brian ‘Breaghach’ Mág Samhradháin (d. 1298). Brian was the eldest son and was born in 1592. His younger brother was Giolla na Naomh Magauran.

== Chieftainship ==
On the death of the McGovern chief, his father Feidhlimidh Mág Samhradháin on 20 January 1622, Brian took the chieftaincy at the age of 30.

== Ballymagauran Castle ==
A survey taken at Ballymagauran in August 1622 stated that- "Brian Magauran hath 1,000 acres in which is a bawn of sodds and within it a stone howse thatched, with chymneys and a part of it lofted. He setts his land from yeare to yeare to ye Irish, who plowgh by ye taile."

An Inquisition of King Charles I of England held in Cavan town on 4 October 1626 stated that Phelim Magawrane died on 20 January 1622 and his lands went to his son Brian who succeeded him as chief. Brian was aged 30 and married to Mary O’Brien.

Ballymagauran Castle was besieged and destroyed by Oliver Cromwell's army in 1649. Sir William Petty’s Down Survey map of 1659 shows the castle in the townland of Dromkirke with inscription "Stone house in repair".

== 1625 Rising ==
In 1625 the McGoverns planned an uprising against the English government. On 21 August 1625, the Fermanagh Assize Judges wrote from Enniskillen to the Lord Deputy of Ireland, Henry Cary, 1st Viscount Falkland as follows-

We received news of it on arriving at Enniskillen from the Archbishop of Cashel and Sir William Cole. The Maguires of Fermanagh and Magawrans of Cavan were the leaders. They proposed to raise arms in anticipation of a Spanish landing, to surprise the castles, and to take back their confiscated lands now in the hands of undertakers. We examined one Phelim bane McCabe and gained from him the names of the ringleaders, both Maguires. We drew bills of indictment against four leaders. We arraigned and tried them by a jury of good freeholders of the English who found them all guilty. We shall sentence them to death; but if your Lordship wishes to mitigate the sentence, they can be sent to Dublin; provided they have a good guard, for the natives are all embarked in the plot. We await Deputy's advice before proceeding further. We do not like to set the witnesses free lest they should receive violence from the friends of the accused. Nor can we imprison them as there is no separate room in the jail, and they would have to be with the accused. We have therefore remitted them to the sheriff's house, only to be restrained from conference with any of the Irish, for which we have undertaken to try and get the sheriff some payment.

On 20 August 1625 Phelim bane McCabe swore-

that he found Bryan McTerlagh McCoigh McGawran and Cahell McGawran of the Largan (Blacklion), amongst others, in a wood, where they were taking some snuffing tobacco. Afterwards Terlagh Wolly Maguire came and asked him to join a rebellion, saying that the Spaniard was coming and on the sea, and that the King was dead. He met the conspirators again subsequently and they urged him to join them and rob the country. If the Spaniards came the natives would rise and take Portora, Castleton, the Castle of Tully, and Sir John Dunbar's house. The leader was to be Shane a' Warra Maguire, and others of the Largan and Clanawly. And that the names of the conspirators in the land of Cavan were Terlagh Oge Magawran and Gerrod Magawran (alias Ferdinando).

== 1629 Petition ==
Brian signed his name as Breyn Mc Gauranes on a 'Petition of the inhabitants of Cavan to the lord deputy and council, 8 July 1629'.

== Family ==
Brian had at least three sons by his wife Mary O'Brien. His eldest son was Charles Magauran who succeeded him as chief. His other sons were Domhnall and Feidhlimidh.

Preceded by Feidhlimidh Mág Samhradháin	Chief of McGovern clan 1622–16?? AD	Succeeded by Charles Magauran
