= Tomás mac Maghnus Mág Samhradháin =

Tomás mac Maghnus Mág Samhradháin (anglicised Thomas McGovern) was lineage head of the McGoverns and Baron or Lord of Tullyhaw barony, County Cavan from 1512 until his death in 1532.

== Ancestry ==
His ancestry was Tomás son of Maghnus (d. 1497) son of Tomás Óg (d. 1494) son of Tomás na Fésóige (d. 1458) son of Fearghal (d. 1393) son of Tomás (d. 1343) son of Brian ‘Breaghach’ Mág Samhradháin (d. 1298). He was the eldest son and his younger brother Uaithne Mág Samhradháin was also a chief of the clan from 1540.

== Career ==
Tomás was the leader of a dissident sept within the McGovern clan, which led to conflict with the reigning McGovern chief, Cathal Mág Samhradháin, the First.

The Annals of the Four Masters for 1512 state-

Philip, the son of Turlough Maguire, with his sons and the sons of Thomas, son of Manus Magauran, made an incursion into Teallach-Eachdhach (Tullyhaw), and took a prey from Turlough, the son of Hugh Magauran, Tanist of the territory; and they slew Turlough himself as he followed in pursuit of the prey. From thence they proceeded to the Crannog of Magauran, which they took; and they also made a prisoner of Magauran himself, although he was sick, but they afterwards left him behind, because they could not conveniently take him with them. The son of O'Reilly, i. e. Edmond Roe, the son of Hugh, son of Cathal, afterwards came up with these men of Fermanagh, and with the grandsons of Manus, defeated them, and slew Donough, the son of Redmond, son of Philip Maguire; Philip, the son of Owen, son of Donnell Ballagh Maguire; Hugh, the son of Owen, son of Turlough Maguire; Murtough Roe, son of Murrough; and James, the son of Magrath Maguire, besides many others; and many horses were taken from them on that day.

== Chieftainship ==
On the death of the McGovern chief Cathal Mág Samhradháin, the First in 1512, Tomás took the chieftaincy and moved to the chief's residence in Ballymagauran.

The Annals of the Four Masters for 1512 state-

Magauran (Cathal, the son of Hugh, son of Owen) died; and Thomas, the son of Manus Magauran, was styled Lord.

During his reign the McGoverns were involved in border skirmishes with the Maguires.

The Annals of Ulster for 1521 state-

Donchadh, son of Ruaidhri, son of Brian Mag Uidhir, was slain this year by the sons of Mag Samradhain, namely, by Uaithne, son of Maghnus Mag Samradhain and by Domnall junior, son of Domnall Gapped-tooth Mag Samradhain. And there was not a man of his means in Ireland, in my opinion, that was of better hospitality than that Donchadh.

The Annals of the Four Masters for 1521 state-

Donough, the son of Rory, son of Brian Maguire, was slain by the sons of Magauran, namely, Donnell Oge, son of Donnell Bearnagh, and Owny, the son of Manus Magauran. And there was not of his tribe in his time a better man than this Donough.

The Annals of the Four Masters for 1527 state-

Flaherty, the son of Rory, son of Brian Maguire, was slain by Teallach-Eachdhach, i.e. by Owny, the son of Manus Magauran.

There were also internal troubles between the members of the McGovern Clan.

The Annals of Ulster for 1532 state-

The son of Mag Samradhain, namely, Domnall junior, son of Domnall Gapped-tooth, was slain with one stroke of javelin by Aithne, son of Maghnus, son of Thomas Mag Samradhain.

== Death ==
The Annals of Ulster for 1532 state-

Mag Samradhain died this year; namely, Thomas, son of Maghnus Mag Samradhain: to wit, a chief who was the best of those that came in Tellach-Echach within the memory of every one.

The Annals of the Four Masters for 1532 state-

Magauran, son of Manus, son of Thomas, Chief of Teallach-Eachdhach Tullyhaw, died.

== Family ==
Tomás had at least two sons Maghnus na Cerrbhach (Manus 'The Gambler') and Brian. Three of Brian's sons became ceann fine- Brian Óg Mág Samhradháin, Tomas Óg Mág Samhradháin and Feidhlimidh Mág Samhradháin.

| Preceded by Cathal Mág Samhradháin, the Second | Chief of McGovern clan 1512–1532 AD | Succeeded by Uaithne Mág Samhradháin |
