= Corran, County Cavan =

Townland in County Cavan, Ireland

Coordinates: 54.07514°N 7.810271°W

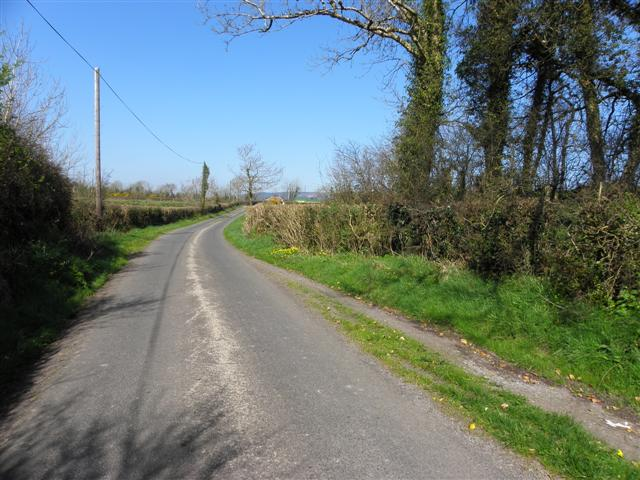
Road at Corran townland, Templeport, County Cavan, heading north.

Corran (from Irish Corrán, meaning 'a reaping hook, anything bent or crooked or serrated') is a townland in the civil parish of Templeport, County Cavan, Ireland. It lies in the Roman Catholic parish of Templeport and the barony of Tullyhaw.

== Geography ==
Corran is bound on the north by Killycluggin townland, on the west by Kilnavert and Derrycassan townlands, on the south by Toberlyan and Toberlyan Duffin townlands, and the east by Bellaheady townland in Kildallan Parish. Corran can be entered using the regional R205 road, several minor roads, rural and disused lanes, and the Cavan and Leitrim Railway. The townland covers 146 statute acres.

== History ==
In medieval times the McGovern tuath of Tullyhaw was divided into economic taxation areas called ballibetoes, from the Irish Baile Biataigh (Anglicized as 'Ballybetagh'), meaning 'A Provisioner's Town or Settlement'. The original purpose was to enable the farmer, who controlled the baile, to provide hospitality for those who needed it, such as poor people and travellers. The ballybetagh was further divided into townlands farmed by individual families who paid a tribute or tax to the head of the ballybetagh, who in turn paid a similar tribute to the clan chief. The steward of the ballybetagh would have been the secular equivalent of the erenagh in charge of church lands. There were seven ballibetoes in the parish of Templeport. Corran was located in the ballybetagh of Bally Cooleigie (alias 'Bally Cowleg'). In Irish this was Baile Cúl Ó nGuaire meaning "The Town of Guaire's Corner", or possibly Baile Cúl Ó Gabhair, meaning "The Town of the Goats' Corner".

The 1609 Ulster Plantation Baronial Map depicts the townland as Corran. In the 1652 Commonwealth Survey, the area's name was spelled as Corrane, but by the time of the 1665 Down Survey map, it was once again depicted as Corran.

The earliest surviving mention of the town's name is in the Book of Magauran, which was written in or around 1344. Poem 31, stanza 6 refers to the death of Tomás Mág Samhradháin, Chief of the McGovern clan from 1303-1343.

The death of the fair-skinned son of Brian has given us a distaste for levity;
The departure of Corann's Flower from his body (Dul do sgaith Chorainn a curp) has punished us for our levity.

From medieval times until 1606, Corran formed part of the lands owned by the McGovern (name) clan. Richard Tyrrell of Tyrrellspass, County Westmeath, purchased the townland c.1606 from Cormack McGovern, who was probably the son of Tomas Óg mac Brian Mág Samhradháin, who reigned as chief of the McGovern clan from 1584. A schedule, dated 31 July 1610, of the lands Tyrrell owned in Tullyhaw prior to the Ulster Plantation included: The two cartrons of Kearwnn, called Knockecheren and Achancassy in the ballebety of Kwlieg (a cartron was about 30 acres of arable land. The larger ballybethagh was called 'Bally Coologe'. Knockecheren is probably the Irish 'Cnoc Eichthighearn', meaning "The Hill of Eachern". Achancassy is probably the Irish "Achadh Cathasaigh", meaning 'Casey's Field'). In the Plantation of Ulster, Tyrrell swapped his lands in Corran for additional land in the barony of Tullygarvey where he lived at the time.

On 27 February 1610, King James VI and I then granted one poll of "Curran to William O'Shereden, gentleman, Cheefe of his Name" in the English grant to begin settlement of the Ulster province. William Sheridan was the chief of the Sheridan Clan in County Cavan. He was the son of the previous chief, Hugh Duff O'Sheridan of Togher town, Kilmore parish, and County Cavan. Hugh Duff O'Sheridan had been attainted on 12 January 1604, at a point in his life when he simultaneously held the lands of Togher, Derrevoyny, and Inche. William was the ancestor of the famous Sheridan theatrical family.

William died sometime before 1638, leaving two sons, Owen (of Mullaghmore, Tullyhunco) and Patrick (of Raleagh townland, Kildallan parish). Owen Sheridan succeeded to his father's lands, confirmed by a grant of Curran, given to him by Charles I of England and dated 6 March 1637. Owen's son Denis was born in 1612 and became a Catholic priest in charge of Kildrumferton parish, County Cavan. He later converted to Protestantism, and on 10 June 1634, William Bedell, the Protestant Bishop of Kilmore, ordained him as a Minister of the Church of Ireland. Two days later, Denis was collated to the Vicarage of Killasser in the Diocese of Kilmore.

Denis had several children, including William Sheridan (Bishop of Kilmore and Ardagh from 1682-1691) (his son Donald kept up the Templeport connection by marrying Mrs Enery of Bawnboy), Patrick Sheridan (Protestant Bishop of Cloyne from 1679-1682), and Sir Thomas Sheridan (Chief Secretary of State for Ireland from 1687-1688).

The Sheridan lands in Corran were confiscated in the Cromwellian Act for the Settlement of Ireland 1652 and were distributed as follows:

The 1652 Commonwealth Survey lists the proprietor as Walter Jooneen. By the time of the Hearth Money Rolls compiled on 29 September 1663, there were two Hearth Tax payers in Curran: Thomas Reade and Brian Magragh. When King Charles II of England wrote a grant to James Thornton dated 30 January 1668, he described 98 acres, 3 roods, and 24 perches in Corren. Lastly, a deed dated 8 June 1730 by John Johnston of Currin refers to lands in Currin.

In the Templeport Poll Book of 1761, there were only three people registered to vote in Corron in the 1761 Irish general election: Michael Banagher, Robert Johnston, and Thomas Jones. Only Banagher lived in Corran, also owning a freehold in Ballymagauran, whereas the other two lived in Ballymagirril and Killywillin but owned freeholds in Corran.

They were entitled to two votes each. Banagher voted for Barry Maxwell, 1st Earl of Farnham, who lost the election, and for Lord Newtownbutler (later Brinsley Butler, 2nd Earl of Lanesborough), who was elected as a Member of Parliament for Cavan County. Johnston and Jones voted for Charles Coote, 1st Earl of Bellomont and for Lord Newtownbutler (later Brinsley Butler, 2nd Earl of Lanesborough), both of whom were elected to be Members of Parliament for Cavan County. While the poll book may have been sparse because many residents did not vote, the more likely explanation is that all other inhabitants of Corran were likely not freeholders entitled to vote.

A deed by Arthur Ellis dated 19 Mar 1768 includes the lands of Corrann.

A deed by Gore Ellis dated 24 Feb 1776 includes the lands of Corran.

The 1790 Cavan Carvaghs list spells the name as Corran. In less than seventy years, the Tithe Applotment Books for 1827 listed twenty four tithepayers in the townland, a notable increase from the previously recognized three people of Corran. By 1841, the population of the townland was 106: 51 males and 55 females. There were nineteen houses in the townland, two of which were uninhabited.

In 1851, the population of the townland was reduced to 90, made up of 54 males and 36 females. This and future the subsequent population decline were likely byproducts of the Great Famine (Ireland). At this time, there were fourteen houses in the townland, of which only one was uninhabited.

Griffith's Valuation of 1857, which incorporated more precise surveying methods than previous records, lists twenty one landholders in the townland. By 1861, the population of the townland had once again fallen, this time to 86, 48 males and 38 females. There were seventeen houses in the townland, of which two were uninhabited. In the 1901 census of Ireland, there were ten families listed in the townland, and in the 1911 census of Ireland, there were only seven families listed in the townland, continuing the pattern of a declining population.

== Currin School ==
The book Bawnboy and Templeport History Heritage Folklore by Chris Maguire gives the following description of the local school:

The right to teach in schools was restored to Catholics under the Relief Act of 1772 and from that time onward education progressed in the parish. The second Report from the Commissioners of Irish Education Inquiry 1826 shows that eight schools were operating in the parish of Templeport, including Currin School. They were attended by a total of 670 pupils. All except one of these schools were mud wall cabins and overcrowded. Reading, writing and arithmetic were the main subjects taught. Currin was a pay school in a mud cabin. The headmaster was James Kilagher who had a salary of £18 per annum. There were 97 pupils of whom 68 were Catholic and 29 Church of Ireland. 62 were boys and 35 were girls. In 1831 a state system of primary education came into being under which the National Education Board was set up. Between 1839 and 1849 Currin was taken over under the National Board at the request of Rev. Philip Magauran P. P.

Roll No. 1995 of the Reports from the Commissioners of National Education in Ireland gives the following figures for the Corrin School:

- 1846: One male and one female teacher who received a combined annual salary of £21. 132 pupils, 80 boys and 56 girls.
- 1854: One male teacher and one female workmistress who between them received an annual salary of £29-10s. 90 pupils, 58 boys and 32 girls.
- 1862: Patrick Maguire was the headmaster and Mary Maguire was the workmistress, both of whom were Roman Catholics. There were 125 pupils. All except seven students were Roman Catholic, while the others identified with the Church of Ireland. The Catechism was taught to the Catholic pupils on Saturdays from 12 noon to 1pm.
- 1874: One male teacher and one female work-mistress who together received a combined annual salary of £42. 96 pupils, 51 boys and 45 girls.
- 1890: There were 132 pupils.

Currin School is now officially known as St. Mogue's N.S. Built in 1993, it was officially opened by Taoiseach Albert Reynolds on 3 June 1994. The principals of Currin N.S. include: Patrick Maguire (1839-'83), Michael Maguire (1883-1923), Jack Tiernan (1923-'35), Mrs. E. Tiernan (1935-'37), Mr. Fleming (1937), William Lane (1938-'50), Mrs. E. Tiernan (1950-'60), Mrs. Margaret Dolan (1960-'68), Máirtín McGowan (1968-'94), Brendan McGowan (1994–2021) and Kieran Conefrey (2021 to present). Assistant principals of the school have included Mrs. Patrick Maguire, Mrs. Michael Maguire, Annie Kellegher, Mrs. E. Tiernan, Miss Connaughton (later Mrs. Rock), Mrs. Philomena Maguire, Bríd Flynn, Bernadette Whitney, Mrs. Betty McGowan, Teresa McCaffrey, and Evelyn McManus.

== Antiquities ==
1. An earthen ringfort.
2. An earthen ring-barrow or tumulus.
3. Another earthen ring-barrow or tumulus.
4. A Holy Well called Tober Patrick (meaning St. Patrick's Well) surrounded by boulders which served as stations for an annual Pattern (devotional) which was held there at the end of July. It is believed that this is the well that St. Patrick blessed the pagans at after he destroyed Crom Cruach’s idols The 9th century Vita tripartita Sancti Patricii states "Patrick founded a church in that place, namely, Domnach Maighe Sleacht, and left therein Mabran Barbarus Patricii, a relative of his and a prophet. And there is Patrick's well (Tipra Pátraic), wherein he baptized many". The townland's name may be an oblique reference to the nearby idol of Crom Cruach. The Ordnance Survey Namebooks of 1836 states "there is a holy well near the West side of the townland called Tubber-Patrick round which the Papists perform a station annually on Donagh-Dernagh or the last Sunday in summer. There is nothing else remarkable in the townland".
