= Toberlyan =

Townland in Ireland

Toberlyan (from Irish usually given as Tobar Laighin, meaning either 'St Leynie's Well' or "The Well of the Spear" but probably more correctly Tobar Lann, meaning the 'Well of the Church' or Tobar Linn, meaning the 'Well of the Pool' or Tobar Loin, meaning the 'Well of the High Wet Mountain Flat') is a townland in the civil parish of Templeport, County Cavan, Ireland. It lies in the Roman Catholic parish of Templeport and barony of Tullyhaw. An old sub-division was called Melick (from Irish Míleac meaning 'The Marsh' (probably referring to the low-lying wet land bordering Coologe Lough on the south))

== Geography ==
Toberlyan is bounded on the north by Corran townland, on the west by Derrycassan townland, on the south by Coologe townland and on the east by Toberlyan Duffin townland. Its chief geographical features are Coologe Lough, a stream and a stone quarry. Toberlyan is traversed by minor roads and rural lanes. The townland covers 172 statute acres.

== History ==
In medieval times the McGovern tuath of Tullyhaw was divided into economic taxation areas called ballibetoes, from the Irish Baile Biataigh (Anglicized as 'Ballybetagh'), meaning 'A Provisioner's Town or Settlement'. The original purpose was to enable the farmer, who controlled the baile, to provide hospitality for those who needed it, such as poor people and travellers. The ballybetagh was further divided into townlands farmed by individual families who paid a tribute or tax to the head of the ballybetagh, who in turn paid a similar tribute to the clan chief. The steward of the ballybetagh would have been the secular equivalent of the erenagh in charge of church lands. There were seven ballibetoes in the parish of Templeport. Toberlyan was located in the ballybetagh of Bally Cooleigie (alias 'Bally Cowleg'). In Irish this was Baile Cúl Ó nGuaire meaning "The Town of Guaire's Corner", or possibly Baile Cúl Ó Gabhair, meaning "The Town of the Goats' Corner".

In the Plantation of Ulster by grant dated 29 April 1611, King James VI and I granted 175 acres to Cormacke and Wony McGawran, comprising Garrerishmore one poll, Dufferagh one poll, Killanaigy one poll and half the poll of Meligg, but it is probable that the lands had been in the possession of the McGovern clan for several hundred years before this and it was just a Surrender and regrant confirming the existing title to the McGoverns. The said McGawrans were the children of a previous chief of the clan, Tomas Óg Mág Samhradháin who was elected in 1584. The remaining half of Melick was granted in the same grant to Donogh Magawran, gent. Loughercan, 1 poll and half the poll of Melegg. The lands are not shown on either the Plantation map of 1609 or the Down survey map of 1658 but would have been sub-divisions of Coologe townland at the time. Dufferagh is the modern townland of Toberlyan Duffin so Toberlyan townland was probably Garrerishmore, (possibly the Irish 'Garraidh Mór', meaning "The Big Garden") as the 1790 Cavan Carvaghs list describes it as Tobberlyan and Garrusbegg.

The McGovern lands in Toberlyan were confiscated in the Cromwellian Act for the Settlement of Ireland 1652 and were distributed as follows-

The 1652 Commonwealth Survey lists the name as Toberleyen and Meeliocke and the proprietor as Brian MacGillebreeda with the tenant being Hugh McSweene.

A grant dated 30 January 1668 from King Charles II to Maurice McJelbredy (probably the son of the aforementioned previous owner Brian McGilbride) reads one pole in Tubenleene and ye 1/3 part of Mellick pole, 46a-1r-13p at an annual rent of 12 shillings and sixpence. The rest of Mellick was granted, inter alia, to James Thornton - 2/3 part of a pole of Melicke 139 acres.

In the 18th century Toberlyan came into the possession of the Hinds family. Walter Hinds (1703-1777) of Corrakane, Denn parish, Co. Cavan, left a will dated 5 Aug 1777 and proved on 18 July 1778. His Estate was large and he named eight beneficiaries, including Martha (Faris) Hinds, Ralph Hinds, Walter Hinds, John Hinds, William Hinds, Thomas Hinds, Anne Hinds and Mary (Hinds) Clarke. He left Toberlyan to his son Ralph as follows- To Ralph Hinds, his eldest son, the lands of Toberlion, Meelick and Duffin and the responsibility to pay his (Ralph's) brother John an annual income of £40. Also to Ralph, and to his heirs forever, the lands of Nedd and Carnagee, and £1000 to be paid out of his father's effects together with two score of the best bullocks on the lands which he is to enjoy after his father's decease. The will of Ralph Hinds dated 15 April 1794 and proved on 10 May 1794 included, inter alia, Toberlion, Meelick and Duffin in the County of Cavan.

The 1790 Cavan Carvaghs list spells the name as Tobberlyan and Millick.

In the 1825 Registry of Freeholders for County Cavan there was one freeholder registered in Tobberlyan- John Dunn. He was a Forty-shilling freeholders holding a lease for lives from his landlord, Ralph Hinds.

The Tithe Applotment Books for 1827 list forty eight tithepayers in the townland.

The Toberlyan Valuation Office Field books are available for November 1839.

Griffith's Valuation of 1857 lists fourteen landholders in the townland.

On 17 March 1871 a rent-charge on the land belonging to the Hinds family was sold by the Landed Estates Court, including on That part of Tubberlion called Millea otherwise Millick.

== Census ==
Year	Population	Males	Females	Total Houses	Uninhabited
1841	121	64	57	20	0
1851	93	50	43	19	0
1861	38	22	16	7	0
1871	62	26	36	13	0
1881	46	25	21	10	0
1891	49	23	26	9	0

In the 1901 census of Ireland, there are five families listed in the townland.

In the 1911 census of Ireland, there are five families listed in the townland.

== Antiquities ==
1. Four standing stones which have now been toppled and moved to a quarry 120 metres away from their original location.
2. An Iron Age barrow or tumulus.
3. A copper axe was found in the townland.
