= Camagh =

Townland in Ballymagauran, County Cavan, Ireland

Coordinates: 54.0723008°N 7.6723732°W

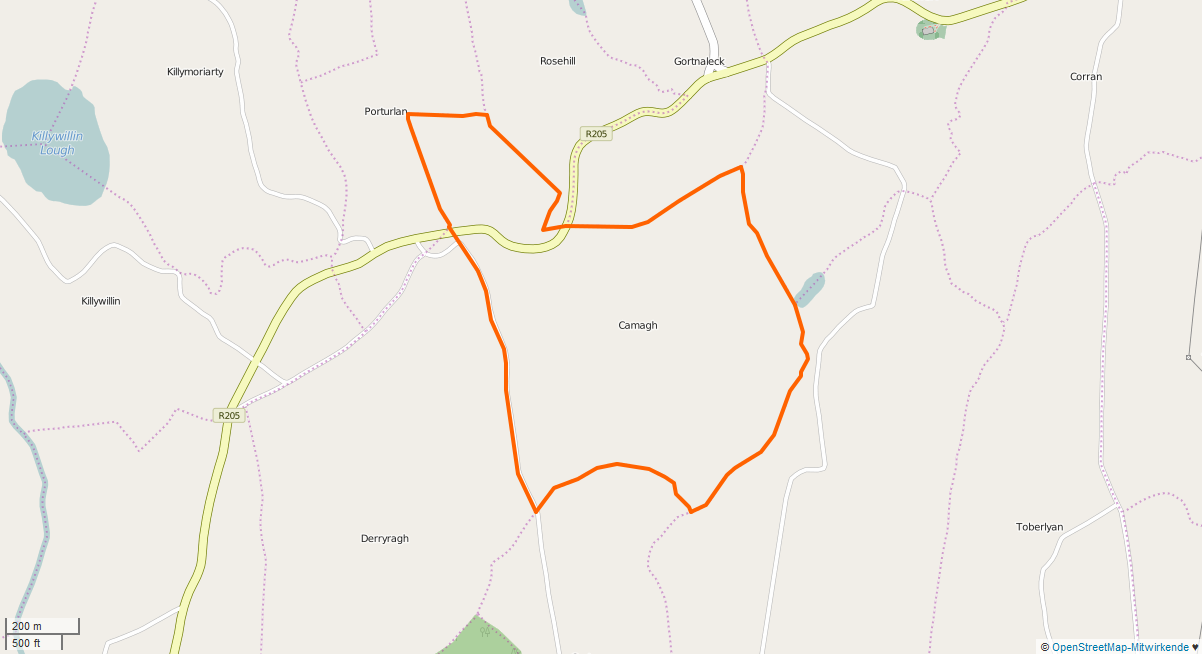
OpenStreetMap of Camagh

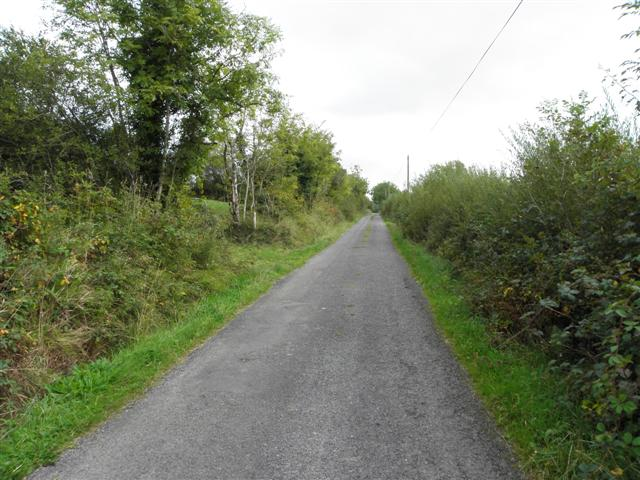
Road at Camagh townland, Templeport, County Cavan, Ireland, heading east

Camagh (from Irish either Cam-achadh meaning 'A crooked field' or Cam-magh meaning 'A crooked plain') is a townland in the civil parish of Templeport, County Cavan, Ireland. It lies in the Roman Catholic parish of Templeport and barony of Tullyhaw. The local pronunciation is Commagh.

== Geography ==
Camagh is bounded on the north by Rosehill, Templeport and Gortnaleck townlands, on the west by Derryragh and Porturlan townlands, on the south by Gorteen, Templeport and Derrycassan townlands and on the east by Kilnavert townland. Its chief geographical features are Camagh Lough and forestry plantations. Camagh is traversed by the regional R205 road and several rural lanes. The townland covers 163 statute acres.

== Etymology ==
In medieval times Coologe Lough stretched all the way north up to and including Camagh Lake, before being reduced by later drainage works. On the 1656 Down Survey map of Tullyhaw, the lake is depicted as a crooked shape, which may be the origin of the townland name.

== History ==
In medieval times the McGovern barony of Tullyhaw was divided into economic taxation areas called ballibetoes, from the Irish Baile Biataigh (Anglicized as 'Ballybetagh'), meaning 'A Provisioner's Town or Settlement'. The original purpose was to enable the farmer, who controlled the baile, to provide hospitality for those who needed it, such as poor people and travellers. The ballybetagh was further divided into townlands farmed by individual families who paid a tribute or tax to the head of the ballybetagh, who in turn paid a similar tribute to the clan chief. The steward of the ballybetagh would have been the secular equivalent of the erenagh in charge of church lands. There were seven ballibetoes in the parish of Templeport. Camagh was located in the ballybetagh of Ballymagauran. The historical spellings of the ballybetagh are Ballymackgawran & Ballimacgawran (Irish = Baile Mhic Shamhráin = McGovern's Town).

Until the Cromwellian Act for the Settlement of Ireland 1652, Camagh included the modern townland of Gorteen, Templeport as one of its subdivisions. Another subdivision was 'Gort na Muc Lach' which means A cultivated field where pigs feed.

The 1609 Baronial Map depicts the townland as Cammagh. The 1652 Commonwealth Survey lists it as Camagh. The 1665 Down Survey map depicts it as Comaike. William Petty's 1685 map depicts it as Camaik.

In the Plantation of Ulster by grant dated 29 April 1611, along with other lands, King James I granted the two polls of Camagh to the McGovern Chief, Feidhlimidh Mág Samhradháin. The townland had been part of the McGovern chief's personal demesne for several hundred years before this and it was just a Surrender and regrant confirming the existing title to the then chief. This is confirmed in a visitation by George Carew, 1st Earl of Totnes in autumn 1611 when he states that Magauran had his own land given him on this division. An Inquisition of King Charles I held in Cavan town on 4 October 1626 stated that the aforesaid Phelim Magawrane died on 20 January 1622 and his lands including two polls of Camagh went to his son, the McGovern chief Brian Magauran who was aged 30 (born 1592) and married.

The McGovern lands in Camagh were confiscated in the Cromwellian Act for the Settlement of Ireland 1652 and were distributed as follows:

The 1652 Commonwealth Survey lists the proprietor as Ensign Henry Robinson and others. He also owned Derrynananta Lower townland in Glangevlin parish and Derradda townland in Drumreilly parish in the survey.

In the Hearth Money Rolls compiled on 29 September 1663 there were four Hearth Tax payers in Camocke- John Horne, Robert Rice, Donogh McCorister and the widow Margaret Sinkler.

A grant dated 30 January 1668 from King Charles II to James Thornton included half a pole of ye 2 poles of Cama alias Camick, called Gortnemucklagh, containing 37 acres and 2 roods. On the same day, a grant dated 30 January 1668 from King Charles II to John Davies included 98 acres in ye poles of Camagh and a grant to Hugh McFaden of 6 acres 1 rood 13 perches in Connagh. Less than 1 1/2 years later another grant dated 7 July 1669 from King Charles II to John, Lord Viscount Massareene included 12 acres 2 roods 27 perches in Comack.

A deed dated 10 May 1744 spells the name as Camaugh.

The 1790 Cavan Carvaghs list spells the townland name as Camagh.

Affidavits by Francis Finlay of Camagh dated 31 October 1825 about the church tithes of Templeport parish is available at

The Tithe Applotment Books for 1827 list six tithepayers in the townland.

In 1833 one person in Camagh was registered as a keeper of weapons- Francis Finlay.

The Camagh Valuation Office Field books are available for 1839–1841.

Griffith's Valuation of 1857 lists seven landholders in the townland.

== Census ==
Year	Population	Males	Females	Total Houses	Uninhabited
1841	17	9	8	2	0
1851	22	14	8	4	0
1861	37	21	16	5	0
1871	22	10	12	3	0
1881	21	11	10	3	0
1891	15	10	5	3	0

In the 1901 census of Ireland, there are six families listed in the townland, and in the 1911 census of Ireland, there are still six families listed in the townland.

== Antiquities ==
The Ordnance Survey Namebooks of 1836 state: The townland is bounded on the West by a lake and a stream. There is an old Danish fort near the centre of the townland near which are situated the houses of the tenantry.

The chief structures of historical interest in the townland are:

1. An earthen ringfort.
2. A standing stone.
