= Toberlyan Duffin =

Townland in County Cavan, Ireland

Toberlyan Duffin (Toberlyan = Irish derived place name usually given as Tobar Laighin, meaning either 'St Leynie's Well' or "The Well of the Spear" but probably more correctly either Tobar Lann, meaning the 'Well of the Church', or Tobar Linn, meaning the 'Well of the Pool' or Tobar Loin, meaning the 'Well of the High Wet Mountain Flat'. Duffin is usually given as meaning 'belonging to the Duffin family' but the earliest spelling is Dufferagh which probably means Dubh Rath meaning 'The Black Fort' (referring to the ringfort still in the townland) is a townland in the civil parish of Templeport, County Cavan, Ireland. It lies in the Roman Catholic parish of Templeport and barony of Tullyhaw.

== Geography ==
Toberlyan is bounded on the north by Corran townland and Bellaheady townland in Kildallan parish, on the west by Toberlyan townland, on the south by Coologe townland and on the east by Killarah townland in Kildallan parish. Its chief geographical features are the Shannon-Erne Waterway, a small stream and a plantation. Toberlyan is traversed by minor roads and rural lanes. The townland covers 160 statute acres.

== History ==
In medieval times the McGovern tuath of Tullyhaw was divided into economic taxation areas called ballibetoes, from the Irish Baile Biataigh (Anglicized as 'Ballybetagh'), meaning 'A Provisioner's Town or Settlement'. The original purpose was to enable the farmer, who controlled the baile, to provide hospitality for those who needed it, such as poor people and travellers. The ballybetagh was further divided into townlands farmed by individual families who paid a tribute or tax to the head of the ballybetagh, who in turn paid a similar tribute to the clan chief. The steward of the ballybetagh would have been the secular equivalent of the erenagh in charge of church lands. There were seven ballibetoes in the parish of Templeport. Toberlyan Duffin was located in the ballybetagh of Bally Cooleigie (alias 'Bally Cowleg'). In Irish this was Baile Cúl Ó nGuaire meaning "The Town of Guaire's Corner", or possibly Baile Cúl Ó Gabhair, meaning "The Town of the Goats' Corner").

In the Plantation of Ulster by grant dated 29 April 1611, along with other lands, King James VI and I granted, inter alia, one poll of Dufferagh to Cormacke and Wony McGawran, but it is probable that the lands had been in the possession of the McGovern clan for several hundred years before this and it was just a Surrender and regrant confirming the existing title to the McGoverns. The said McGawrans were the children of a previous chief of the clan, Tomas Óg Mág Samhradháin who was elected in 1584. The lands are not shown on either the Plantation map of 1609 or the Down survey map of 1658 but would have been sub-divisions of Coologe townland at the time.

The McGovern lands in Toberlyan Duffin were confiscated in the Cromwellian Act for the Settlement of Ireland 1652 and were distributed as follows-

The 1652 Commonwealth Survey lists the name as Duffer and the proprietor as Shane McLaghlyne and the tenant as N. Pheely.

In the Hearth Money Rolls compiled on 29 September 1663 there were two Hearth Tax payers in Dustin- William Smith and Shane McBrian.

A grant dated 30 January 1668 from King Charles II to James Thornton included one pole in Duffin.

In the 18th century Toberlyan Duffin came into the possession of the Hinds family. Walter Hinds (1703-1777) of Corrakane left a will dated 5 Aug 1777 and proved on 18 July 1778. His estate was large and he named eight beneficiaries, including Martha (Faris) Hinds, Ralph Hinds, Walter Hinds, John Hinds, William Hinds, Thomas Hinds, Anne Hinds and Mary (Hinds) Clarke. He left Toberlyan Duffin to his son Ralph as follows- To Ralph Hinds, his eldest son, the lands of Toberlion, Meelick and Duffin and the responsibility to pay his (Ralph's) brother John an annual income of £40. Also to Ralph, and to his heirs forever, the lands of Nedd and Carnagee, and £1000 to be paid out of his father's effects together with two score of the best bullocks on the lands which he is to enjoy after his father's decease. A marriage settlement dated 3 February 1784 contained, inter alia, the part of Toberlion called Duffin and Meltea, otherwise Mellick. The will of Ralph Hinds dated 15 April 1794 and proved on 10 May 1794 included, inter alia, Toberlion, Meelick and Duffin in the County of Cavan.

The 1790 Cavan Carvaghs list spells the name as Duffin.

The Tithe Applotment Books for 1827 list forty eight tithepayers in the townland.

The 1836 Ordnance Survey Namebooks state- The townland is bounded on the East by a large stream, and near the centre of the townland there is a beautiful spring from whence a stream proceeds, called by the inhabitants Tubberline Well

The Toberlyan Duffin Valuation Office Field books are available for November 1839.

In 1855 a local landowner in the townland, Charlotte Hinds, was murdered.

Griffith's Valuation of 1857 lists nineteen landholders in the townland.

On 17 March 1871 a rent-charge on the land belonging to the Hinds family was sold by the Landed Estates Court, including on The part of Tubberlion called Driffin.

== Census ==
Year	Population	Males	Females	Total Houses	Uninhabited
1841	65	39	26	16	0
1851	57	26	31	16	1
1861	81	38	43	16	0
1871	26	16	10	5	0
1881	23	15	8	6	0
1891	28	18	10	5	0

In the 1901 census of Ireland, there are eight families listed in the townland.

In the 1911 census of Ireland, there are nine families listed in the townland.

== Antiquities ==
1. A portal tomb
2. A ring-fort, probably the one the townland is named after.
3. A Holy Well, which the townland is named after.
4. A Bullaun stone.
5. A socketed spearhead found 1.5 feet below the surface of a field.
