= James McGovern =

James McGovern may refer to:

- James F. McGovern (born 1946), United States Under Secretary of the Air Force, 1986–1989
- James F. McGovern (coach) (1893–1976), American college football and basketball player and coach
- James J. McGovern, president of A.T. Still University
- James B. McGovern Jr. (1922–1954), World War II fighter pilot and aviator with the Central Intelligence Agency
- Jim McGovern (American politician) (born 1959), member of the United States House of Representatives from Massachusetts, 1997–present
- Jim McGovern (golfer) (born 1965), American PGA Tour player
- Jim McGovern (British politician) (born 1956), Member of the United Kingdom Parliament, 2005–2015
- Jimmy McGovern (born 1949), English television scriptwriter
