= Munlough =

Munlough may refer to the following places in the Republic of Ireland:

- Munlough North
- Munlough South
