= Derrycassan =

Townland in Lissanover, County Cavan, Ireland

Coordinates: 54°04′10″N 7°39′04″W

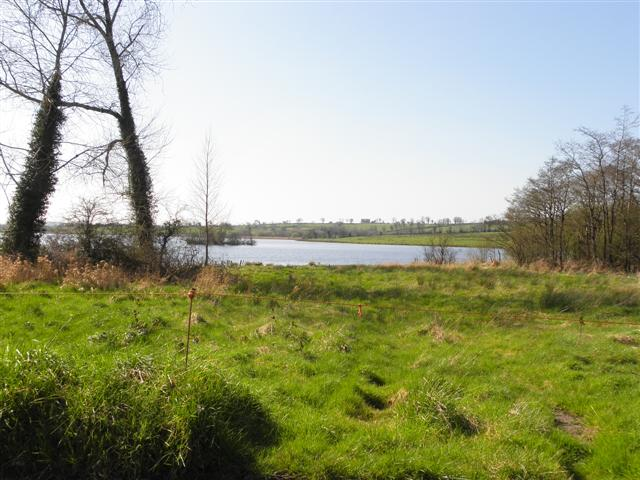
Derrycassan townland

Derrycassan (from Irish Doire an Cásain meaning either the "Path through the Oakwood" or "Cassan's Oakwood" (Cassan being an early Irish form of the present name Cassidy) is a townland in the civil parish of Templeport, County Cavan, Ireland. It lies in the Roman Catholic parish of Templeport and barony of Tullyhaw. The local pronunciation is Dorrahasson.

== Geography ==
Derrycassan is bounded on the north by Kilnavert and Corran townlands, on the west by Camagh, Sruhagh and Gorteen, Templeport townlands, on the south by Derryniggin in County Leitrim and Burren townland and on the east by Coologe and Toberlyan townlands. Its chief geographical features are Coologe Lake, Derrycassan Lake and Camagh Lough. Derrycassan is traversed by a public road and several rural lanes. The townland covers 498 statute acres.

== History ==
=== Medieval ===
In medieval times the McGovern barony of Tullyhaw was divided into economic taxation areas called ballibetoes, from the Irish Baile Biataigh (Anglicized as 'Ballybetagh'), meaning 'A Provisioner's Town or Settlement'. The original purpose was to enable the farmer, who controlled the baile, to provide hospitality for those who needed it, such as poor people and travellers. The ballybetagh was further divided into townlands farmed by individual families who paid a tribute or tax to the head of the ballybetagh, who in turn paid a similar tribute to the clan chief. The steward of the ballybetagh would have been the secular equivalent of the erenagh in charge of church lands. There were seven ballibetoes in the parish of Templeport. Derrycassan was located in the ballybetagh of Ballymagauran. The historical spellings of the ballybetagh are Ballymackgawran & Ballimacgawran (Irish = Baile Mhic Shamhráin = McGovern's Town).

The earliest surviving mention of the townland name is Doire Casáin, which appears in an interesting list of the rents due to the McGovern Chief, Maghnus 'Ruadh' Mág Samhradháin about 1400 A.D. It reads as follows:

This is the portion of Doire Casáin- 18 kegs of butter and 8 cakes and half a beef at Christmas and a sheep in autumn and a sheep in summer and two kegs of butter in winter and 8 kegs of meal and as much again in autumn and a keg of butter for Mayday and a gallon of butter for his ploughman in summer.

From this list we see that in 1400 the main type of farming carried on in Derrycassan was milk and beef cattle together with sheep.

A Roman poem from 91 A.D., the Thebaid by Publius Papinius Statius was translated into Irish as Togail na Tebe. This Irish version was transcribed in 1487 in Derrycassan by Diarmaid Bacach mac Parthalain (Dermot "The Lame" MacPartland), in the house of his father, Fineen mac Parthalain. The introduction to the translation translates as

This book was written A.D. 1487, and in the same year died O'Reilly, to wit, Turlough, son of John; and in the same year were slain the sons of O'Rourke, to wit, Tiernan and Brian Roe, to wit, Tiernan was slain by the sons of MacDermot and by Muintir-Eolais in treachery, and Brian by a son of O'Rourke, to wit, by Owen, son of Felim, son of Donough, son of Tiernan; and in the same year was slain Tiernan Duv, son of Donough Blind-eye Tiernan by O'Donnell, to wit, by Hugh Roe O'Donnell; and in the same year was demolished the castle of O'Rourke, to wit, Felim, son of Donough by O'Donnell and by the sons of O'Rourke; and in the same year the fortress of Lough Oughter was taken possession of by the race of Donnell Ban O'Reilly. It was myself Dermot 'The Lame' MacPartland that transcribed this book, to wit, son of Fineen, son of Foirithe, son of Ferral, son of Farlane; and half of this book was written in the house of Fineen, to wit, in Derry Casan, and the other part of it was written in the house of the descendants of Brian of Tullyhaw, that is the mansion house (the McGovern castle in the townland of Ballymagauran), that is, of Felim, son of Tomas Og, son of Tomas Mor (Feidhlimidh mac Tomás Óg Mág Samhradháin was the chief of the McGoverns at the time the book was written); and it was finished in Inishowen upon Thursday during the feast of St Catherine. (Diarmaid Bacach mac Parthalain doscribh in leabar-sa .i. mac Fingin mic Foirithe mic Fergail mic Partalain & a tigh Fingin doscribad leth in lebair-sa .i. a Doire Casain & a tigh mic Briain Tellaigh-Echach dos-cribad in cuid ele de .i. a tigh arosa .i. Feilimid mac Tomais meic Fergail meic Tomais údh tigerna a Tellach Echach re linn in lebairsia do sgribad & ar iniss Eocinain docrichnuighedh e i nDardain re feil Catrina) And G is the Dominical Letter in that year and S the Golden Number. And the hospitality of Felim the son of Thomas the son of Fergus son of that Thomas lord of Tullyhaw during the time when this book was written. And at the same period there were two bishops in the bishopric of Kilmore, to wit, Cormac, son of the bishop Magauran, (Cormac Mág Shamhradháin) and Thomas son of Andrew MacBrady, (Tomás Mac Brádaigh) each one of them alleging that he himself is bishop there; and Felim, son of Donough, son of Tiernan is O'Rourke during the period of those bishops, and John son of Turlough son of John is O'Reilly at that time. And in the same year was slain Ua Mael-Shechlain, to wit, Laighnech Ua Mael-Shechlain, by Conn son of Art ua MaelShechlain. And may the blessing of God rest on the soul of him that wrote this book. And there was war between Magauran and O'Reilly, to wit, John O'Reilly, in that same year; and another war between the descendants of Teige O'Rourke, etc.

Diarmaid Bacach mac Parthalain also wrote or transcribed the following, some in Tullyhaw, probably in Derrycassan. (1) Tochmarc Becfhola or The Wooing of Becfola. (2) Irish translations of romantic tales, lives of saints and other religious texts. (3) Dán do Chormac Mág Shamhradháin Easpag Ardachaidh.

His brother Conall Ballach Mac Parthaláin (Conall "The Freckled" MacPartland) was also a scribe. He produced part of the manuscript Rawlinson B 513 Bodleian Library, Oxford, England.

=== After 1600 ===
The 1609 Baronial Map depicts the townland as Dirricasan. The 1652 Commonwealth Survey spells the name as Derrecassan. The 1665 Down Survey map depicts it as Derrycashan.

In the Plantation of Ulster by grant dated 29 April 1611, along with other lands, King James I granted the two polls of Dirricassan to the McGovern Chief, Feidhlimidh Mág Samhradháin. The townland had been part of the McGovern chief's personal demesne for several hundred years before this and it was just a Surrender and regrant confirming the existing title to the then chief. This is confirmed in a visitation by George Carew, 1st Earl of Totnes in autumn 1611 when he states that Magauran had his own land given him on this division.

An Inquisition of King Charles I of England held in Cavan town on 4 October 1626 stated that the aforesaid Phelim Magawrane died on 20 January 1622 and his lands including two polls of Derricassan went to his son, the McGovern chief Brian Magauran who was aged 30 (born 1592) and married.

The McGovern lands in Derrycassan were confiscated in the Cromwellian Act for the Settlement of Ireland 1652 and were distributed as follows-

The 1652 Commonwealth Survey lists the proprietor as John King & others.

In the Hearth Money Rolls compiled on 29 September 1663 there were three Hearth Tax payers in Dirilussno- James Meeke, Robert Turner and Shane O'Killyn.

A grant dated 1667 from King Charles II to James Thornton included 191 acres and two roods in Derrycassan.

A grant dated 7 July 1669 from King Charles II to John, Lord Viscount Massareene included five acres in Derrychashen.

A deed dated 8 June 1730 by John Johnston of Currin refers to lands in Derryhassan.

The 1790 Cavan Carvaghs list spells the townland name as Derrycassar.

Ambrose Leet's 1814 Directory spells the name as Derryhasson.

In the 1825 Registry of Freeholders for County Cavan there were six freeholders registered in Derrycassan- Thomas Breden, Patrick Gannon, Francis Logan, Owen M'Dermott, Edward Maher and Myles Rorke. They were all Forty-shilling freeholders holding a lease for lives from their landlord. William Blashford of Lissanover.

The Tithe Applotment Books for 1827 list one hundred and forty five tithepayers in the townland.

In 1833 two people in Derrycassan were registered as a keeper of weapons- Thomas Bredin and William Lauder.

The Derrycassan Valuation Office Field books are available for November 1839.

Griffith's Valuation of 1857 lists sixty eight landholders in the townland.

== Census ==
Year	Population	Males	Females	Total Houses	Uninhabited
1841	253	132	121	48	0
1851	191	105	86	43	4
1861	151	75	76	36	0
1871	135	71	64	29	0
1881	116	60	56	24	0
1891	98	49	49	23	1

In the 1901 census of Ireland, there are twenty nine families listed in the townland.

In the 1911 census of Ireland, there are twenty two families listed in the townland.

== Antiquities ==
The chief structures of historical interest in the townland are:

1. An earthen ringfort.
2. An earthen ringfort.
3. A crannóg in Derrycassan lake. An ancient stone axe was found there in 1935 and is now in the National Museum of Ireland.
4. A crannóg in Derrycassan lake.
5. A medieval Bullaun Stone is located in the townland, which local tradition claims is a cure for warts.
6. In 1863 a small, very perfect, copper battle-axe, 61 inches long, and 3 inches wide, with four rivets and an iron weapon-tool, adze-shaped on one side, and hatchet on the other, 9 inches long were found in Derrycassan.
