= Rosehill, Templeport =

Rosehill
- Townland
- Location in Ireland
- Coordinates: 54°5′8″N 7°39′43″W
- Country: Ireland
- County: Cavan
- Civil parish: Templeport

Area
  - Total: 0.2364 km^{2} (0.0913 sq mi)

Rosehill is a townland in the civil parish of Templeport, County Cavan, Ireland. It lies in the Roman Catholic parish of Templeport and barony of Tullyhaw.

== Geography ==
Rosehill is bounded on the north by Ray, Templeport and Cloneary townlands, on the west by Porturlan townland, on the south by Camagh townland, and on the east by Gortnaleck townland. Its chief geographical features are Gortnaleck Lough, a pond, a stream, and a wood. Rosehill is traversed by the national secondary R205 road (Ireland), minor public roads, and rural lanes. The townland covers 56 statute acres.

== History ==
In medieval times the McGovern barony of Tullyhaw was divided into economic taxation areas called ballibetoes, from the Irish Baile Biataigh (Anglicized as 'Ballybetagh'), meaning 'A Provisioner's Town or Settlement'. The original purpose was to enable the farmer, who controlled the baile, to provide hospitality for those who needed it, such as poor people and travellers. The ballybetagh was further divided into townlands farmed by individual families who paid a tribute or tax to the head of the ballybetagh, who in turn paid a similar tribute to the clan chief. The steward of the ballybetagh would have been the secular equivalent of the erenagh in charge of church lands. There were seven ballibetoes in the parish of Templeport. Rosehill was located in the ballybetagh of Ballymagauran. The historical spellings of the ballybetagh are Ballymackgawran & Ballimacgawran (Irish = Baile Mhic Shamhráin = McGovern's Town).

The 1609 Baronial Map depicts the townland as part of Kilcrooghan (Irish 'Coill Cruachán' meaning The Wood of the Round Hill (the other part of Kilcrooghan is now the modern townland of Gortnaleck).

The 1665 Down Survey map depicts it as part of Killerachan.

William Petty's 1685 map depicts it as part of Killracan.

An 1809 map of ecclesiastical lands in Templeport depicts it as Bellacrohaw (from Irish: Bél Átha Cruachán, meaning The Entrance to the Ford of the Round Hill), which was probably its old Irish name before it was changed to Rosehill in the 19th century.

The 1652 Commonwealth Survey lists the proprietor of Killecrooghan as John Boyd.

In the Hearth Money Rolls compiled on 29 September 1663, there were two people paying the Hearth Tax in Killecrohean- John Bride and Robert Grige

The 1790 Cavan Carvaghs list spells the name as Kilnecroghill.

Ambrose Leet's 1814 Directory spells the name as Rose-hill with the resident being Rev. Joseph S. Noble (Joseph Story Noble was the Church of Ireland curate of Templeport from 1802 to 1830). This seems to be the earliest mention of Rosehill.

Affidavits by Francis Finlay and John Roycroft of Rosehill from 1825 show the church tithes of Templeport parish.

The Tithe Applotment Books for 1827 list three tithepayers in the townland.

The Rosehill Valuation Office Field books are available for November 1839.

Griffith's Valuation of 1857 lists one landholder in the townland.

== Census ==
Year	Population	Males	Females	Total Houses	Uninhabited
1841	7	3	4	1	0
1851	7	4	3	1	0
1861	2	1	1	2	1
1871	6	3	3	1	0
1881	5	0	5	1	0
1891	4	1	3	2	1

In the 1901 census of Ireland, there are two families listed in the townland.

In the 1911 census of Ireland, there are no residents listed in the townland.

== Antiquities ==
- An earthen ringfort. The 1836 Ordnance Survey Namebooks state- There is an old Danish fort near the south side of the townland and a respectable farmhouse near the centre from whence the townland is named.
