= Cathal mac Aodha Mág Samhradháin =

Cathal mac Aodha Mág Samhradháin (anglicised Charles McGovern) or Cathal Mág Samhradháin was chief of the McGovern Clan and Baron or Lord of Tullyhaw barony, County Cavan from 1504 until his death in 1512.

== Ancestry ==
His ancestry was Cathal son of Aodh son of Eóghan son of Tomás na Feasoige (d. 1458) son of Fearghal (d. 1393) son of Tomás (d. 1343) son of Brian ‘Breaghach’ Mág Samhradháin (d. 1298). His uncle was Éamonn Mág Samhradháin, previous chief of the clan. Cathal's brothers were Toirdealbhach (who was Tánaiste of the clan and died in 1512), Tadhg (d. 1498) and Maghnus ‘The Cleric’ (d. 1498).

== Career ==
There was internecine warfare between the McGovern clan and the reigning chief, Domhnall ‘Bernach’ Mág Samhradháin, was slain on 15 February 1496 by Cathal and others in Templeport Church. As this was on the anniversary of the previous chief's drowning, Feidhlimidh Mág Samhradháin, the First, it may have been in revenge for that and the killing probably happened during the anniversary mass.

The Annals of Ulster for 1496 state-

Mag Samradhain, namely, Domnall Gapped-tooth, son of Thomas, son of Fergal Mag Samradhain, was slain in treachery by Maghnus, son of Thomas, son of Thomas, son of Fergal Mag Samradhain and by the sons of Aedh, son of Eogan, son of Thomas, son of Fergal and by the sons of Brian of Tellach-Eathach, namely, Tadhg and Philip, that is, sons of Feidhlimidh, son of Brian. In Tempoll-an-puirt that was done, on the feast day of Berach, at the end of a year from the day his other brother and his tribe-head was drowned.

The Annals of Loch Cé for 1496 state-

Mac Samhradhain, i.e. Domhnall Bernach, son of Thomas, son of Ferghal, was killed in treachery.

The Annals of Connacht for 1496 state-

Mac Samradain, that is Domnall Bernach son of Tomas son of Fergal, was treacherously killed.

The internecine fighting continued and Cathal and his brothers were involved.

The Annals of Ulster for 1497 state-

Maghnus, son of Thomas Mag Samradhain, was slain by the descendants of Eogan Mag Samhadhain on the 7th of the Ides of November (7th of November).

On 28 September 1498 two of Cathal's brothers, Tadhg and Manus the priest, were killed in a Maguire raid on the castle of Ballymagauran.

The Annals of Ulster for 1498 state-

Philip, son of Toirdelbach, son of Philip Mag Uidhir, went on an inroad into Tellach-Eathach (Tullyhaw) and the sons of Edmond Mag Uidhir and the sons of Gilla-Padraig Mag Uidhir went with him thither and the country was traversed by them to Snam-na-neach (The Swimming of the Horses). And the town of Mag Samradhain (Ballymagauran) was burned by them and they turned back and came not on cattle-spoils or chattels. And the worthies of the country overtook them on that retreat with a very large pursuing party and those nobles turned on the pursuing party and defeated them spiritedly, successfully then and slew three and twenty of the pursuing party in that rout, two sons of Aedh, son of Eogan Mag Samradhain, namely, Tadhg and Maghnus (that is, the cleric). And the other portion of them slain were of the Clann-Imair and of the Clan of Mac-in-taisigh and of the muster of Tellach-Eathach also. And there was slain also by the Fir-Manach in the heat of that rout Flaithbertach, son of Donn, son of Edmond Mag Uidhir. And on the vigil of Michaelmas precisely those deeds were done.

The next year the McGoverns took revenge on the Maguires.

The Annals of the Four Masters for 1499 state-

Manus, the son of Godfrey Oge, son of Godfrey Roe Maguire, was slain by the people of Teallach Eachdhach (Tullyhaw).

The Annals of Ulster for 1499 state-

Maghnus, son of Godfrey junior, son of Godfrey Mag Uidhir the Red, was slain this year by the Tellach Eachach.

== Chieftainship ==
On the death of the chief, his uncle Éamonn Mág Samhradháin in 1504, Cathal took the chieftaincy and moved to the chief's residence in Ballymagauran.

The Annals of Ulster for 1505 state-

The daughter of Mag Samradhain, namely, Una, wife of Failghe, son of Domnall Ua Raighilligh the White, died this year.

The Annals of the Four Masters for 1506 state-

Manus, the son of Godfrey Roe Maguire, and Felim, the son of Brian of Teallach-Eachdhach (Tullyhaw), died.

The Annals of Ulster for 1506 state-

The son of Brian of Tellach-Eathach, namely, Feidhlimidh, died.

The internecine warfare continued in 1507 when Cathal's brother, Toirdealbhach, the Tánaiste of the clan, killed the son of a previous chief Domhnall ‘Bernach’ Mág Samhradháin.

The Annals of the Four Masters for 1507 state-

Brian, the son of Magauran (Donnell Bearnach), was slain by Turlough, the son of Hugh, son of Owen Magauran.

The warfare with the Maguire clan of Fermanagh also continued during Cathal's reign.

The Annals of the Four Masters for 1508 state-

Cormac, the son of Niall, son of Gilla-Duv, son of Hugh Maguire, was slain in a nocturnal assault, by the people of Teallach-Eachdhach (Tullyhaw) and by the sons of Philip, son of Brian Maguire.

In 1512 there was conflict with Tomás Mág Samhradháin, the Fourth who was the leader of a dissident sept within the McGovern clan and was attempting to claim the chieftainship. He enlisted the aid of the Maguire clan and Cathal was captured.

The Annals of the Four Masters for 1512 state-

Philip, the son of Turlough Maguire, with his sons and the sons of Thomas, son of Manus Magauran, made an incursion into Teallach-Eachdhach (Tullyhaw), and took a prey from Turlough, the son of Hugh Magauran, Tanist of the territory; and they slew Turlough himself as he followed in pursuit of the prey. From thence they proceeded to the Crannog of Magauran, which they took; and they also made a prisoner of Magauran himself, although he was sick, but they afterwards left him behind, because they could not conveniently take him with them. The son of O'Reilly, i. e. Edmond Roe, the son of Hugh, son of Cathal, afterwards came up with these men of Fermanagh, and with the grandsons of Manus, defeated them, and slew Donough, the son of Redmond, son of Philip Maguire; Philip, the son of Owen, son of Donnell Ballagh Maguire; Hugh, the son of Owen, son of Turlough Maguire; Murtough Roe, son of Murrough; and James, the son of Magrath Maguire, besides many others; and many horses were taken from them on that day.

== Death ==
Cathal died in 1512 probably of the sickness and rough treatment referred to above.

The Annals of the Four Masters for 1512 state-

Magauran (Cathal, the son of Hugh, son of Owen) died; and Thomas, the son of Manus Magauran, was styled Lord.

Preceded by Éamonn Mág Samhradháin	Chief of McGovern clan 1504–1512 AD	Succeeded by Tomás Mág Samhradháin, the Fourth
