= Keenagh, Templeport =

Townland in the civil parish of Templeport, County Cavan, Ireland

Keenagh (from Irish Caonach meaning 'A Mossy Place') is a townland in the civil parish of Templeport, County Cavan, Ireland. It lies in the Roman Catholic parish of Templeport and barony of Tullyhaw.

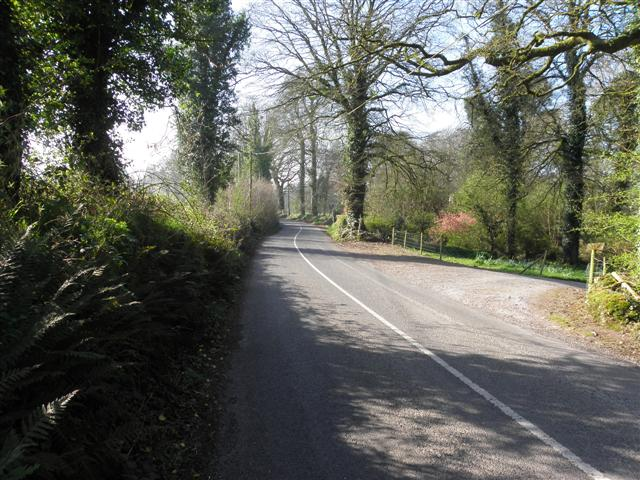
Road at Keenagh (geograph 2868632)

== Geography ==
Keenagh is bounded on the north by Kilsallagh and Munlough North townlands, on the west by Cor, Templeport townland, on the south by Lissanover townland and on the east by Munlough South townland. Its chief geographical features are a wood, a stream and a dug well. Keenagh is traversed by minor public roads and rural lanes. The townland covers 62 statute acres.

== History ==
The 1609 Baronial Map depicts the townland as Kennagh.

The 1652 Commonwealth Survey spells the name as Kinagh.

The 1665 Down Survey map depicts it as Knough.

Keenagh formed part of the termon or hospital lands belonging to Templeport Church and so its history belongs to the ecclesiastical history of the parish. It would have belonged to the parish priest and the erenach family rather than the McGovern chief. In the 16th century these ecclesiastical lands in Templeport were seized in the course of the Reformation in Ireland and kept first by the English monarch and then eventually granted to the Anglican Bishop of Kilmore.

An Inquisition held in Cavan Town on 20 June 1588 valued the total vicarage of Templeport at £10.

An Inquisition held in Cavan Town on 19 September 1590 found the termon or hospital lands of Templeport to consist of four polls of land at a yearly value of 4 shillings. Keenagh was one of these four polls.

By grant dated 6 March 1605, along with other lands, King James VI and I granted a lease of the farm, termons or hospitals of Tampleporte containing 4 pulls for 21 years at an annual rent of 10 shillings to Sir Garret Moore, 1st Viscount Moore. Keenagh was one of these pulls.

By grant dated 10 August 1607, along with other lands, King James VI and I granted a further lease of the farms, termons or hospitals of Templeport containing 2 pulls for 21 years at an annual rent of 13 shillings to the aforesaid Sir Garret Moore, 1st Viscount Moore of Mellifont Abbey, County Louth. This grant covered the two extra polls of ecclesiastical land in the parish which had been overlooked in the previous inquisitions and grants.

A survey held by Sir John Davies (poet) at Cavan Town on 6 September 1608 stated that- the ecclesiastical lands of Templeporte were containing 6 pulls lying near the parish church and that the rectory was appropriated to the Abbey of Kells, County Meath. Keenagh was one of these pulls.

An Inquisition held in Cavan Town on 25 September 1609 found the termon land of Templeport to consist of six polls of land, out of which the Bishop of Kilmore was entitled to a rent of 10 shillings and 2/3rd of a beef per annum. Keenagh was one of these six polls. The Inquisition then granted the lands to the Protestant Bishop of Kilmore.

By a deed dated 6 April 1612, Robert Draper, the Anglican Bishop of Kilmore and Ardagh granted a joint lease of 60 years over the termons or herenachs of, inter alia, 6 polls in Templepurt to Oliver Lambart, 1st Lord Lambart, Baron of Cavan, of Kilbeggan, County Westmeath and Sir Garret Moore, 1st Viscount Moore, of Mellifont Abbey, County Louth. Keenagh formed part of this lease.

By deed dated 17 July 1639, William Bedell, the Anglican Bishop of Kilmore, extended the above lease of Templepart to Oliver Lambert’s son, Charles Lambart, 1st Earl of Cavan.

The 1652 Commonwealth Survey lists the proprietor The Lord of Cavan (i.e. Charles Lambart, 1st Earl of Cavan).

The 1790 Cavan Carvaghs list spells the name as Kinagh.

An 1809 map of ecclesiastical lands in Templeport depicts Keenagh as still belonging to the Anglican Church of Ireland. The tenants on the land were Felix Rourke, William Kernan, Philip Plunket and James Plunket.

In the 1825 Registry of Freeholders for County Cavan there were two freeholders registered in Keenagh- Philip Plunket and John Plunket. They were both Forty-shilling freeholders holding a lease for lives from their landlord, Nathaniel Sneyd M.P. of Ballyconnell. Their residence was in Keenagh but their freehold was in Gurtunawahy.

The Tithe Applotment Books for 1827 list eight tithepayers in the townland.

The Keenagh Valuation Office Field books are available for November 1839.

Griffith's Valuation of 1857 lists ten landholders in the townland.

== Census ==
Year	Population	Males	Females	Total Houses	Uninhabited
1841	34	19	15	6	0
1851	18	9	9	3	0
1861	30	15	15	7	0
1871	23	13	10	3	0
1881	13	7	6	2	0
1891	11	5	6	2	0

In the 1901 census of Ireland, there are three families listed in the townland.

In the 1911 census of Ireland, there are still three families listed in the townland.

== Antiquities ==
The chief structures of historical interest in the townland are-

1. An earthen ringfort.
2. A Foot Stick over the stream
