= Munlough South =

Townland in the civil parish of Templeport, County Cavan, Ireland

Coordinates: 54.07514°N 7.810271°W

Munlough South (from Irish Móinloch Íochtar meaning 'the Bog Lake, Lower’) is a townland in the civil parish of Templeport, County Cavan, Ireland. It lies in the Roman Catholic parish of Templeport and barony of Tullyhaw. It is named Munlough South to distinguish it from the neighbouring townland of Munlough North.

== Geography ==
Munlough South is bounded on the north by Munlough North townland, on the west by Keenagh, Templeport townland, on the south by Lissanover townland and on the east by Cavanaquill townland. Its chief geographical features are the dried bed of the lake that gives the townland its name, a stream and a dug well. Munlough South is traversed by minor roads and rural lanes. The townland covers 69 statute acres.

== History ==
The 1609 Baronial Map depicts the townland as Mollaieghtra.

The 1627 Ulster Plantation grant spells it as Mullagheitea and Monelaugh.

The 1665 Down Survey map depicts the townland as Monedagh.

William Petty's 1685 map depicts it as Monedagh.

From medieval times until 1606, the townland formed part of the lands owned by the McGovern (name) clan. William Tyrrell, the brother of Richard Tyrrell of Tyrrellspass, County Westmeath, purchased the townland c.1606 from Cormack McGovern, who was probably the son of Tomas Óg mac Brian Mág Samhradháin, who reigned as chief of the McGovern clan from 1584. A schedule, dated 31 July 1610, of the lands William Tyrrell owned in Tullyhaw prior to the Ulster Plantation included: Mallagh Echteragh, two poles. The Commissioners of the Plantation stated: We find that Mr William Tirrell hath had ye possession of these polls some 4 years, of some a lesse tyme without title but only by agreement with some of the natives for protection. In the Plantation of Ulster, Tyrrell swapped his lands in Munlough South for additional land in the barony of Tullygarvey where he lived at the time.

The townland was held by the Crown from 1610 and was later given to the Church of Ireland in 1627. On 25 January 1627 a grant was made of- one pole of Mullagheitea and one pole of Monelaugh to Thomas Groves, the Rector or Vicar of the parish of Templepurt to hold as glebe land of Templeport Church. The said Thomas Groves was the Anglican rector of Templeport parish from 1626 to 1632.

In the Irish Rebellion of 1641 Martin Kilhare of Drumlane made a deposition about the rebellion in Munlough as follows-

(239) Martine Killhare of Drumlane in the Countie of Cauan doe depose that my Brother Godferrye Killhare of Munlogh within the parish of Templeporte within the Baronie of Tullahae and Countie of Cauan, had in personale estate when this Rebellione first begane- Cowes ould and younge woorth £64; Horses woorth £20; Corne and haye worth £10; Houshould goods £10; In all £104. All these goods ware taken from him forceably aboute the 24th of October 1641 by the hands of Gillernew mc Gawran, and Manus mc Gawran, both of the parish of Templeport and Baronie of Tullaha and Countie of Cauan gent. Donnell Ogge mc Gawran of the same gent, Brian Ogge Mc Gawran of the same gent., Brian Ogge Mc Gawran of the same gent, and their followers. And further he cannot depose. Signum [mark] predicti Martini 13 Jan: 1641 Jur coram nobis 30 Jan: 1641 Roger Puttocke Will: Hitchcock

The 1652 Commonwealth Survey lists the townland as Mullaghightragh with the proprietor being The Commonwealth of England and the tenant being Lieutenant John Blackforde, both of whom appear as proprietor in several other Templeport townlands in the same survey.

In the Hearth Money Rolls compiled on 29 September 1663 there was one Hearth Tax payer in Munlagh- Cahir McGawran who had two hearths, which indicates a larger house than normal in the townland.

The 1790 Cavan Carvaghs list spells the name as Munlagh, Gleb-lands.

An 1809 map of ecclesiastical lands in Templeport depicts Munlough South. The tenant on the land was Mr. Armstrong.

The Tithe Applotment Books for 1827 list twenty eight tithepayers in the townland

The Munlough South Valuation Office Field books are available for December 1839.

Griffith's Valuation of 1857 lists two landholders in the townland.

== Census ==
| Year | Population | Males | Females | Total Houses | Uninhabited |
|---|---|---|---|---|---|
| 1841 | 26 | 9 | 17 | 5 | 0 |
| 1851 | 13 | 6 | 7 | 2 | 0 |
| 1861 | 16 | 7 | 9 | 2 | 0 |
| 1871 | 11 | 5 | 6 | 2 | 0 |
| 1881 | 11 | 5 | 6 | 2 | 0 |
| 1891 | 8 | 5 | 3 | 2 | 0 |

In the 1901 census of Ireland, there are two families listed in the townland, and in the 1911 census of Ireland, there is only one family listed in the townland.

== Antiquities ==
1. An earthen ringfort (Site number 1028 in "Archaeological Inventory of County Cavan", Patrick O’Donovan, 1995, where it is described as- Marked 'Fort' on OS 1836 ed. Not marked on subsequent eds. Site has been largely levelled leaving only an arc of low bank visible, running from NW-NNE. Situated on the slope of a low hill).
