= Cloneary =

Townland in County Cavan, Ireland

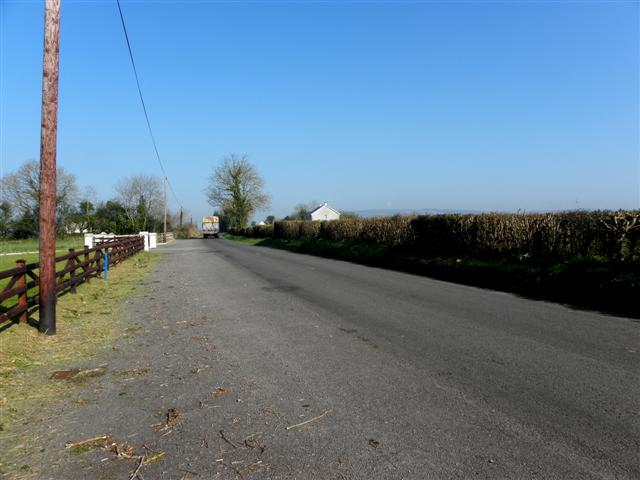
Road at Cloneary townland, Templeport, County Cavan, Ireland, heading NNW.

Cloneary (from Irish Cluain an Aoire meaning 'The Shepherd’s Meadow') is a townland in the civil parish of Templeport, County Cavan, Ireland. It lies in the Roman Catholic parish of Templeport and barony of Tullyhaw.

== Geography ==
Cloneary is bounded on the north by Port, Templeport and Cor, Templeport townlands, on the west by Ray, Templeport townland, on the south by Rosehill, Templeport and Gortnaleck townlands and on the east by Lissanover townland. Its chief geographical features are Gortnaleck Lough, a stream and a dug well. The 1836 Ordnance Survey Namebooks state- The soil is light and is intermixed with limestone which is burned and used for manure. Cloneary is traversed by minor public roads, rural lanes and the disused Cavan and Leitrim Railway. The townland covers 142 statute acres.

== History ==
The 1609 Baronial Map depicts the townland as Clonerin.

The 1652 Commonwealth Survey spells the name as Killelery.

The 1665 Down Survey map depicts it as Cownaren.

Cloneary formed part of the "termon lands" or hospital lands belonging to Templeport Church and so its history belongs to the ecclesiastical history of the parish. It would have belonged to the parish priest and the erenach family rather than the McGovern chief. In the 16th century these ecclesiastical lands in Templeport were seized in the course of the Reformation in Ireland and kept first by the English monarch and then eventually granted to the Anglican Bishop of Kilmore.

An Inquisition held in Cavan Town on 20 June 1588 valued the total vicarage of Templeport at £10.

An Inquisition held in Cavan Town on 19 September 1590 found the termon or hospital lands of Templeport to consist of four polls of land at a yearly value of 4 shillings. Cloneary was one of these four polls.

By grant dated 6 March 1605, along with other lands, King James VI and I granted a lease of the farm, termons or hospitals of Tampleporte containing 4 pulls for 21 years at an annual rent of 10 shillings to Sir Garret Moore, 1st Viscount Moore. Cloneary was one of these pulls.

By grant dated 10 August 1607, along with other lands, King James VI and I granted a further lease of the farms, termons or hospitals of Templeport containing 2 pulls for 21 years at an annual rent of 13 shillings to the aforesaid Sir Garret Moore, 1st Viscount Moore of Mellifont Abbey, County Louth. This grant covered the two extra polls of ecclesiastical land in the parish which had been overlooked in the previous inquisitions and grants.

A survey held by Sir John Davies (poet) at Cavan Town on 6 September 1608 stated that- the ecclesiastical lands of Templeporte were containing 6 pulls lying near the parish church and that the rectory was appropriated to the Abbey of Kells, County Meath. Cloneary was one of these pulls.

An Inquisition held in Cavan Town on 25 September 1609 found the termon land of Templeport to consist of six polls of land, out of which the Bishop of Kilmore was entitled to a rent of 10 shillings and 2/3rd of a beef per annum. Cloneary was one of these six polls. The Inquisition then granted the lands to the Protestant Bishop of Kilmore.

By a deed dated 6 April 1612, Robert Draper, the Anglican Bishop of Kilmore and Ardagh granted a joint lease of 60 years over the termons or herenachs of, inter alia, 6 polls in Templepurt to Oliver Lambart, 1st Lord Lambart, Baron of Cavan, of Kilbeggan, County Westmeath and Sir Garret Moore, 1st Viscount Moore, of Mellifont Abbey, County Louth. Cloneary formed part of this lease.

By deed dated 17 July 1639, William Bedell, the Anglican Bishop of Kilmore, extended the above lease of Templepart to Oliver Lambert's son, Charles Lambart, 1st Earl of Cavan.

The 1652 Commonwealth Survey lists the proprietor as being The Lord of Cavan (i.e. Charles Lambart, 1st Earl of Cavan).

The 1790 Cavan Carvaghs list spells the name as Clonehiren.

An 1809 map of ecclesiastical lands in Templeport depicts Clonery as still belonging to the Anglican Church of Ireland. The tenants on the land were- T. McGovern and Mr Loudon.

The Tithe Applotment Books for 1827 list eight tithepayers in the townland.

In 1833 one person in Cloneary was registered as a keeper of weapons- William Gibson.

The Cloneary Valuation Office Field books are available for 1839–1841.

Griffith's Valuation of 1857 lists three landholders in the townland.

== Census ==
Year	Population	Males	Females	Total Houses	Uninhabited
1841	30	15	15	4	0
1851	31	13	18	4	0
1861	21	12	9	3	0
1871	23	12	11	4	0
1881	27	16	11	4	0
1891	29	17	12	5	0

In the 1901 census of Ireland, there are six families listed in the townland.

In the 1911 census of Ireland, there are eight families listed in the townland.

== Antiquities ==
The chief structures of historical interest in the townland are-

1. An earthen ringfort (Site number 339 in "Archaeological Inventory of County Cavan", Patrick O’Donovan, 1995, where it is described as- Raised circular area (int. diam. 43m ENE-WSW) enclosed by a low earthen bank and a wide, deep, partly waterlogged fosse. From E-S-WSW fosse has been largely infilled. Original entrance not recognisable. An earlier report (OPW 1969) recorded a possible souterrain at the centre of the internal area (CV013-009002-). Densely overgrown with vegetation.)
2. A souterrain under the above ringfort (Site number 1228 in "Archaeological Inventory of County Cavan", Patrick O’Donovan, 1995, where it is described as- Situated c. 3m E of the centre of the internal area of Cloneary rath (CV013-009001-). An earlier report (OPW 1969) recorded a partially buried slab (L 0.9m; dims. 0.67m x 0.29m) which was interpreted as a possible souterrain lintel. Not identified in the course of the last site visit.)
3. A stone bridge
4. Bawnboy Road Railway Station
5. Station Master's house
6. Railway Goods Shed
