= Patrick McGovern =

Patrick McGovern may refer to:

- Patrick Aloysius Alphonsus McGovern (1872–1951), former Bishop of Cheyenne
- Patrick Joseph McGovern (1937–2014), American businessman, founder of International Data Group
- Patrick McGovern (Irish politician) (1875–1949), Irish Centre Party/Fine Gael politician
- Patrick Edward McGovern (1944–2025), American biomolecular archaeologist, University of Pennsylvania Museum
- Patrick Terence McGovern (1920–1984), Irish Catholic priest and unofficial member of the Legislative Council of Hong Kong
