= Uaithne Mág Samhradháin =

Chief for the McGovern Clan

Uaithne Mág Samhradháin (anglicised Owny McGovern) was chief of the McGovern Clan and Baron or Lord of Tullyhaw barony, County Cavan from 1540 until his death.

== Ancestry ==
His ancestry was Uaithne son of Maghnus (d. 1497) son of Tomás Óg (d. 1494) son of Tomás na Feasoige (d. 1458) son of Fearghal (d. 1393) son of Tomás (d. 1343) son of Brian ‘Breaghach’ Mág Samhradháin (d. 1298). He was a younger son and his older brother Tomás Mág Samhradháin, the Fourth was chief of the clan from 1512–1532.

== Career ==
The Annals of the Four Masters for 1521 state-

Donough, the son of Rory, son of Brian Maguire, was slain by the sons of Magauran, namely, Donnell Oge, son of Donnell Bearnagh, and Owny, the son of Manus Magauran. And there was not of his tribe in his time a better man than this Donough.

The Annals of Ulster for 1521 state-

Donchadh, son of Ruaidhri, son of Brian Mag Uidhir, was slain this year by the sons of Mag Samradhain, namely, by Uaithne, son of Maghnus Mag Samradhain and by Domnall junior, son of Domnall Gapped-tooth Mag Samradhain. And there was not a man of his means in Ireland, in my opinion, that was of better hospitality than that Donchadh.

The Annals of the Four Masters for 1527 state-

Flaherty, the son of Rory, son of Brian Maguire, was slain by Teallach-Eachdhach, i.e. by Owny, the son of Manus Magauran.

The Annals of Ulster for 1532 state-

The son of Mag Samradhain, namely, Domnall junior, son of Domnall Gapped-tooth, was slain with one stroke of javelin by Aithne, son of Maghnus, son of Thomas Mag Samradhain.

== Chieftainship ==
On the death of the McGovern chief, Uaithne took the chieftaincy and moved to the chief's residence in Ballymagauran. The Annals of Ulster for 1540 state-

Mac Samradhain was slain in treachery this year and Aithne was made king in his stead.

In a list of the soldiers each Irish chief had in 1540, the entry for the McGoverns reads- Magawran, Lord of Taliagha, 6 horsemen and 200 Kern (soldier). Every kern hath a bowe, a sheaf or 3 speares, a swerd and a skene without harneys and every two have a ladde to beare their geare. Every horsman hath two horses, sume 3, a jacke well harneysed for the more part, a swerd, a skene, a great speare and a dart, Every horss hath a knave and their chefe's horss is ever ledde and one of his knaves ride alway and beare his harneys and speares, if he have harneys.

Preceded by Tomás Mág Samhradháin, the Fourth	Chief of McGovern clan 1540–15?? AD	Succeeded by Brian Óg Mág Samhradháin
