= Kilnavert =

Townland in County Cavan, Ireland

Coordinates: 54°05′13″N 7°38′47″W

Kilnavert (or Kilnavart) (from Irish Cill na bhFeart, meaning 'The Church of the Tumuli') is a townland in the civil parish of Templeport, County Cavan, Ireland. It lies in the civil parish of Templeport and barony of Tullyhaw. The present local pronunciation is Killnavart but up to the 1870s the local pronunciation was Kilfertin.

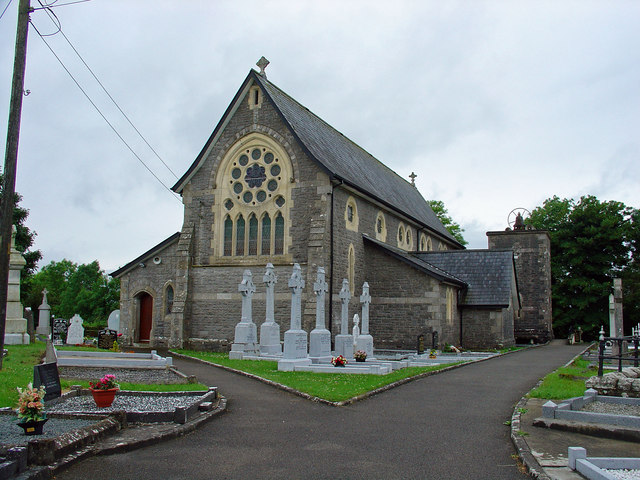
St Patrick's church, Kildallon, Co. Cavan - geograph.org.uk - 1385727

== Geography ==
Kilnavert is bounded on the north by Lissanover and Killycluggin townlands, on the west by Gortnaleck and Camagh townlands, on the south by Derrycassan townland and on the east by Corran, County Cavan townland. Its chief geographical features are Camagh Lough, a gravel pit, a wood, streams, a spring well and dug wells. Kilnavert is traversed by the R205 road, minor roads, rural lanes and the disused Cavan and Leitrim Railway. The townland covers 188 statute acres. The nearest town is Ballyconnell, about 6km to the north-east.

== Etymology ==
The reason for the Irish name Cill na bhFeart meaning The Church of the Tumuli, is that there is a Roman Catholic church. Since pre-christian times there are Megalithic monuments in the townland, including 3 barrows, 3 standing stones, 1 wedge tomb and 1 stone circle.

== History ==
Kilnavert is intimately associated with Saint Patrick and his reputed overthrow of the idol Crom Cruach in Magh Slécht. Kilnavert was originally named Fossa Slécht or Rath Slécht and was the first Christian church founded in County Cavan by Saint Patrick. Tírechán's Memoir written c.680 A.D. states-

Patrick however, sending Methbrain, a foreign kinsman of Patrick's, to Fossam Slécht, who told wonders of God.

The 9th century Vita tripartita Sancti Patricii, p. 93, states- Patrick founded a church in that stead, namely, Domnach Maighe Sleacht, and left therein Mabran [whose cognomen is] Barbarus Patricii, a relative of his and a prophet. And there is Patrick's well, wherein he baptized many. Then Patrick went into the province of Connaught by Snam da En over the Shannon.

Methbrain, also known as Banban the Wise was the first Christian priest of Templeport.

Kilnavert is mentioned several times in the 14th century Book of Magauran.

For example-

Poem 21, stanza 18, written c.1338 refers to Saint Patrick at Kilnavert-

One day when Patrick lay to rest at fair soft-grassed Chill Fhearta, this vision, so consoling to us, was given to his prophetic eye......

Poem 2, Stanza 36 written c.1291

Achadh Fearta, home of stout heroes, where the tombs of our forebears lie side by side. Its name comes from the tombs of the noble Gaoidhil being placed unceasingly on that stone-strewn plain.

Since the 5th century, Kilnavert has formed part of the church lands belonging to Kilnavert Church and so its history belongs to the ecclesiastical history of the parish. It would have belonged to the clergy and the erenach family rather than the Magauran chief. In the 17th century these ecclesiastical lands in Templeport were seized in the course of the Plantation of Ulster and kept first by the English monarch and then in 1610 granted to the Anglican Bishop of Kilmore.

On 26 October 1579 Pope Gregory XIII asked Richard Brady, the Bishop of Ardagh to settle a dispute where the parish priest of Templeport, Fergal Magauran, claimed the chapel of Cillfert was usurped by nobles.

An Inquisition held in Cavan town on 20 June 1588 valued the total vicarage of Templeport at £10.

An Inquisition held in Cavan town on 19 September 1590 found the church lands of Kilfert to consist of two polls of land at a yearly value of 2 shillings.

By grant dated 6 March 1605, along with other lands, King James VI and I granted a lease of 2 polls of Kilfeart for 21 years at an annual rent of 5 shillings to Sir Garret Moore, 1st Viscount Moore.

By grant dated 10 August 1607, along with other lands, King James VI and I granted a lease of the lands of Kilfearte containing 2 pulls for 21 years at an annual rent of £0-6s-6d to the aforesaid Sir Garret Moore, 1st Viscount Moore of Mellifont Abbey, County Louth.

A survey held by Sir John Davies (poet) at Cavan Town on 6 September 1608 stated that- the ecclesiastical lands of Templeporte included 2 polls of Killfeart lying near the chaple of Killfeart which belongs to the church of Templeport.

An Inquisition held in Cavan Town on 25 September 1609 found the termon land of Templeport included two polls of land adjoyninge to the chapple of Kilfert, out of which the Bishop of Kilmore was entitled to a rent of 12d per annum. The Inquisition then granted the lands to the Protestant Bishop of Kilmore.

By a deed dated 6 April 1612, Robert Draper, the Anglican Bishop of Kilmore and Ardagh granted a joint lease of 60 years over the termons or herenachs of, inter alia, 2 polls in Kilfert to Oliver Lambart, 1st Lord Lambart, Baron of Cavan, of Kilbeggan, County Westmeath and Sir Garret Moore, 1st Viscount Moore, of Mellifont Abbey, County Louth.

The sum of £40 was imposed by William Bedell, Bishop of Kilmore on the parish of Templeport for the re-edifying of churches prior to 20 May 1634.

By deed dated 17 July 1639, William Bedell, the Anglican Bishop of Kilmore, extended the above lease of Killfert to Oliver Lambert's son, Charles Lambart, 1st Earl of Cavan.

The 1652 Commonwealth Survey lists the proprietor as The Lord of Cavan (i.e. Charles Lambart, 1st Earl of Cavan).

On 19 January 1586 Queen Elizabeth I of England granted a pardon (No. 4813) to Edmund M'Cormuck M'Ferrall Magawran of Kilfert for fighting against the Queen's forces.

The said Edmund McGovern was the great-grandson of Cormac Mág Shamhradháin, the Roman Catholic Bishop of Kilmore diocese, Ireland from 1476 to 1480 and the anti-bishop of Kilmore from 1480 to 1511.

John O'Hart in his book Irish Pedigrees; or the Origin and Stem of the Irish Nation, p. 414, mentions an incident that occurred at Kilnavert Church c.1590.

Bryan Dolan came with his two sons Cormac and Charles to the neighbourhood of Ballymagauran, near the end of the sixteenth century. A bad time it was for priests and papists; yet, notwithstanding, Cormac and Charles rode on Sunday mornings to Killnavart, to hear Mass, a distance of some ten or twelve miles; and, having come there, they attached their horses by their bridle-reins to the branches of trees near the chapel. Baron MacGauran was then Earl of Tullaghagh, and heard Mass at Killnavart. He observed the two strange young men at Mass, and their horses tied by their bridles to trees near the chapel; he enquired to whom the horses belonged, and where the owners were from. Having been informed on those points, the Baron invited the young men to dinner on the following Sunday; and soon afterwards proffered them a residence in the neighbourhood of Ballymagauran, and they willingly accepted the invitation. Almost immediately afterwards Cormac Dolan, the elder son, married a near relative of the Baron,—the daughter of Terence MacGauran, who was better known as Trealach Caoch or "Blind Terry," in consequence of his being squint-eyed. But the Baron's hospitality and Dolan's marriage became a great misfortune to both parties. In due time after the marriage a son was born to Cormac Dolan; about the same time another child was born for Baron MacGauran, who claimed that his relative Cormac Dolan's wife and daughter of Blind Terry should nurse his (the Baron's) child. Bryan Dolan took this demand as a great insult: he instructed his daughter-in-law to say that he had not come so low that she should become a "hippin-washer" to any man. This message enraged the Baron to madness; he at once rode to Dolan's house, called for the old man, whom he seized by the hair of the head and dragged him by the horse's side at full gallop, and threw him dead on the road. The sons Cormac and Charles seeing the Baron gallop furiously to their house, and immediately galloping back dragging something by his horse's side, one said to the other "the Baron is dragging something after him;" the other exclaimed with an oath "it is my father," and, snapping up a gun that lay near, he rushed to the road and shot the Baron dead on the spot. Old Dolan and the Baron were just buried when the relatives and retainers of the Baron came at night, broke into Dolan's dwelling, and killed the brothers Cormac and Charles. Cormac's wife exclaimed, were there none of the friends of Blind Terry there? They spared her and her child, whose name was Rodger, and reared him up as one of themselves.

The Baron MacGauran referred to was probably the chief of the McGovern Clan, Tomas Óg Mág Samhradháin, who lived in Ballymagauran and who received a pardon on 19 January 1586 from Queen Elizabeth I of England, Thomas oge m'Brien m'Thomas Magawran, of Magawranstowne, for fighting against the Queen's forces.

The 1609 Baronial Map depicts the townland as Kilfart.

The 1652 Commonwealth Survey lists the townland as Kilfart.

The 1665 Down Survey map depicts it as Kilfert.

William Petty's 1685 map depicts it as Killfert.

The 1790 Cavan Carvaghs list spells the name as Kilfart.

An 1809 map of ecclesiastical lands in Templeport depicts the townland as Kilfort which map meant the land was still belonging to the Anglican Church of Ireland. The tenants on the land then were- Richard Bloxham, M. Taggart, Michael Robinson, H. Rorke and J. Murray.

The Tithe Applotment Books for 1827 list nine tithepayers in the townland.

In 1833 two people in Kilnavert were registered as a keeper of weapons- John Murray and Pat Murray.

The 1836 Ordnance Survey Namebooks state:- There is likewise a lake on its south boundary...There is a R.C. chapel near the centre of the townland built about 35 years ago. It stands on the ruins of an old abbey and in the centre of a Danish fort which is used as a grave yard. There is likewise three other old forts through the townland.

The Kilnavert Valuation Office Field books are available for 1839-1841.

Griffith's Valuation of 1857 lists thirteen landholders in the townland. It shows the landlord of Kinavert in the 1850s to be Leonard Dobbin, a nephew of Leonard Dobbin MP for Armagh from 1832 to 1837.

== Census ==
Year	Population	Males	Females	Total Houses	Uninhabited
1841	75	35	40	13	1
1851	52	22	30	11	0
1861	64	25	39	14	1
1871	59	26	33	11	0
1881	59	25	34	12	2
1891	31	13	18	8	1

In the 1901 census of Ireland, there are nine families listed in the townland.

In the 1911 census of Ireland, there are thirteen families listed in the townland.

== Antiquities ==
The chief structures of historical interest in the townland are:

1. A prehistoric ring-barrow, which may be part of a larger ring-barrow cemetery
2. A prehistoric ring-barrow, which may be part of a larger ring-barrow cemetery
3. A prehistoric ring-barrow, which may be part of a larger ring-barrow cemetery
4. A prehistoric standing stone.
5. A prehistoric standing stone.
6. A prehistoric standing stone.
7. A prehistoric stone circle.
8. A prehistoric wedge tomb.
9. St. Patrick's Roman Catholic Church and graveyard. The present church was erected in 1868 to replace an earlier thatched church built about 1798 which in turn replaced earlier churches all the way back to the original church founded on the same site by Saint Patrick in the 5th century.
10. Kilnavert Presbytery, built c.1870.
11. A vernacular 1800 farmhouse.
12. Kilnavert photos from the 1930s.
