= Gortnaleck =

Townland in County Cavan, Ireland

Gortnaleck (from Irish Gort na Leac, meaning 'The Small Field of the Flagstones or Bedrock') is a townland in the civil parish of Templeport, County Cavan, Ireland. It lies in the Roman Catholic parish of Templeport and barony of Tullyhaw.

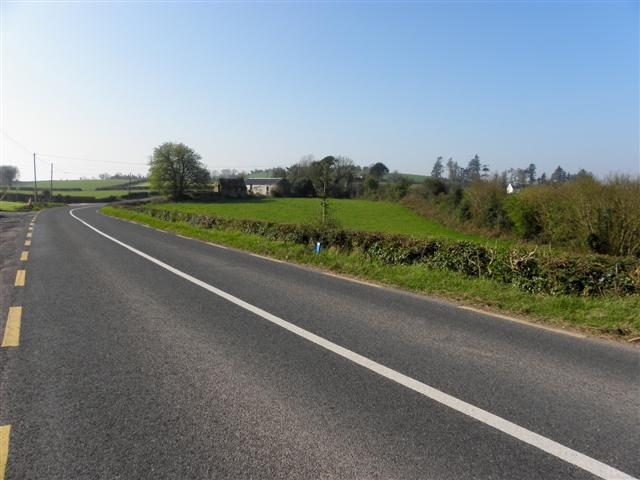
R205 at Gortnaleck (geograph 2868664)

== Geography ==
Gortnaleck is bounded on the north by Cloneary townland, on the west by Rosehill, Templeport townland, on the south by Camagh townland and on the east by Kilnavert townland. Its chief geographical features are Gortnaleck Lough, dug wells and a stone quarry. The 1836 Ordnance Survey Namebooks state-The soil is intermixed with limestone (which limestone is probably what gave the townland its name). Gortnaleck is traversed by the national secondary R205 road (Ireland), minor public roads and rural lanes. The townland covers 95 statute acres.

== History ==
In medieval times the McGovern barony of Tullyhaw was divided into economic taxation areas called ballibetoes, from the Irish Baile Biataigh (Anglicized as 'Ballybetagh'), meaning 'A Provisioner's Town or Settlement'. The original purpose was to enable the farmer, who controlled the baile, to provide hospitality for those who needed it, such as poor people and travellers. The ballybetagh was further divided into townlands farmed by individual families who paid a tribute or tax to the head of the ballybetagh, who in turn paid a similar tribute to the clan chief. The steward of the ballybetagh would have been the secular equivalent of the erenagh in charge of church lands. There were seven ballibetoes in the parish of Templeport. Gortnaleck was located in the ballybetagh of Ballymagauran. The historical spellings of the ballybetagh are Ballymackgawran & Ballimacgawran (Irish = Baile Mhic Shamhráin = McGovern's Town).

The 1609 Baronial Map depicts the townland as part of Kilcrooghan.

The 1652 Commonwealth Survey spells the name as Gortnelecke and also lists Killecrooghan.

The 1665 Down Survey map depicts it as Gortneleck.

William Petty's 1685 map depicts it as Gortneleak.

In the Plantation of Ulster by grant dated 29 April 1611, along with other lands, King James VI and I granted one poll of Gortneleck to the McGovern Chief, Feidhlimidh Mág Samhradháin. The townland had been part of the McGovern chief's personal demesne for several hundred years before this and it was just a Surrender and regrant confirming the existing title to the then chief. This is confirmed in a visitation by George Carew, 1st Earl of Totnes in autumn 1611 when he states that Magauran had his own land given him on this division.

An Inquisition of King Charles I held in Cavan town on 4 October 1626 stated that the aforesaid Phelim Magawrane died on 20 January 1622 and his lands including one poll of Gortnaleck went to his son, the McGovern chief Brian Magauran who was aged 30 (born 1592) and married.

In the Irish Rebellion of 1641 William Reynolds of Lisnaore made a deposition about the rebellion in Lissanover which referred to two rebels from Gortneleck, Daniel McGowran and his son Edmund McGowran, as follows:

folio 260r
William Reinoldes of Lisnaore in the parrish of Templeport in the County of Cavan gent sworne & examined deposeth and sajth That about the beginning of the presente Rebellion this deponent was deprived robbed or otherwise dispoiled & Lost by the Rebells: his meanes goodes & chattells concisting of horses mares beasts Cattle Corne hay howsholdstuff implements of husbandry apparell bookes provition silver spoones swyne & the benefite of his howse and six Poles of Land: due debts & other thinges of the value of three hundreth Sixtie fowre Powndes nine shillings sterling. And further sajth That the Rebells that soe robbed & dispojled him of his personall estate are theis that follow vizt Gillernew Mc Gawren & Hugh mc Manus oge mc Gawren both of the Parrish and County of Cavan aforesaid Turlaghe o Rely Brian Groome mc Gowren Daniell mc Gawren & Charles mc Gawren all of the place aforesaid gent: with divers other Rebells whose names he cannott expresse to the number of 30 or thereabouts And further sajth that theis 4 parties next after named (being duly indebted to this deponent) are or lately were in actuall Rebellion & carry armes with for & amongst the Rebells against his Maiesty and his loyall Subjects vizt ffarrell mc Gawren of the parish of Killiney & County aforesaid gent Cornelius ô Sheriden of in the County of ffermanagh gent, William Greames & Phelim mc Gowren both of Templeporte aforesaid gentlemen: And alsoe saith that the parties hereafter mencioned are or lately were alsoe actors in the same present Rebellion & carried armes & did take parts & assist the Rebells vizt ffarrell Broome mc Kallaghan of the Parrish of Templeport Wanderer: whoe as this deponent hath beene credibly tould murthered this deponents owne mother) Phillipp mc Hugh mc Shane o Rely of Ballinecargie in the County of Cavan Esquire now a Colonell of Rebells Capt Myles o Rely his brother Edmund Mc Mulmore o Rely of or nere Ballirely gent & Myles his sonn whoe when the Rebellion began was high sherriff of the said County of Cavan Phillip mc Mulmore o Rely of Ballytrusse Esquire John ô Rely his sonne & heire Sergeant Maio{r} Hugh Boy o Rely, Connor o Rely of Agheraskilly gent, Edmund mc Kernon of the Parrish of Kildallon gent & Edmund his sonn, & William another of his sons; William Greames of Templeport gentleman Owney Sheredin of the parrish of Kilmore gent, Andrew Mc Gowran of Templeport ffarrell mc Acorby of the same & James Brady of the same parrish gent; Cohonaghe Maguire of Aghloone gent Manus ô Mulmoghery of Aghloone aforesaid yeoman Turlogh mc Brian of Vrhoonoghe yeoman: Shane mc Brian of Killsallough, a popish Preist; ffarrell mc Adeggin of Aghavanny yeoman Owen Mc Adeggan of the same & Daniell mc Gowran of Gortneleck gent & Edmund his sonn: & divers others whose names & places of aboad he cannott Remember William Reynolds Jur 6o Apr 1643 Will: Aldrich Hen: Brereton John Sterne: Cavan William Reinolds Jur 6o Apr 1643 Intw Cert fact [Copy at MS 832, fols 59r59v]

The McGovern lands in Gortnaleck were confiscated in the Cromwellian Act for the Settlement of Ireland 1652 and were distributed as follows-

The 1652 Commonwealth Survey lists the proprietor of Gortnaleck as Hugh McFadeene and the proprietor of Killecrooghan as John Boyd.

In the Hearth Money Rolls compiled on 29 September 1663 there was one person paying the Hearth Tax in the townland Gartnebacke- Hugh McFadin (i.e. the same person mentioned in 1652 above).

Two grants dated 30 January 1668 were made by King Charles II of England as follows- Firstly one cartron of land in Gortnelecke containing 29 acres to Hugh McFaden. This was the same man mentioned in the Commonwealth Survey and Hearth Rolls above. Secondly to Mary Boyd in the parte of ye cartron of Kilcrohan containing 34 acres 0 roods 6 perches at an annual rent of £0-9s-2 1/4d

In the Templeport Poll Book of 1761 there was one person registered to vote in Gortnaleg in the 1761 Irish general election - Richard Hazard. He lived in Garden Hill, County Fermanagh but owned a freehold in Gortnaleck. He was entitled to cast two votes. The four election candidates were Charles Coote, 1st Earl of Bellomont and Lord Newtownbutler (later Brinsley Butler, 2nd Earl of Lanesborough), both of whom were then elected Member of Parliament for Cavan County. The losing candidates were George Montgomery (MP) of Ballyconnell and Barry Maxwell, 1st Earl of Farnham. Hazard voted for Maxwell and Montgomery. Absence from the poll book either meant a resident did not vote or more likely was not a freeholder entitled to vote, which would mean most of the inhabitants of Gortnaleck.

The 1790 Cavan Carvaghs list spells the name as Gortnabeck.

The Tithe Applotment Books for 1827 list four tithepayers in the townland.

In 1833 one person in Gortnaleck was registered as a keeper of weapons – James Lauder.

The Gortnaleck Valuation Office Field books are available for 1839–1840.

Griffith's Valuation of 1857 lists four landholders in the townland.

== Census ==
Year	Population	Males	Females	Total Houses	Uninhabited
1841	36	15	21	5	0
1851	16	6	10	4	1
1861	0	0	0	3	3
1871	6	2	4	2	1
1881	17	10	7	2	0
1891	16	9	7	2	0

In the 1901 census of Ireland, there are four families listed in the townland.

In the 1911 census of Ireland, there are only two families listed in the townland.

== Antiquities ==
The chief structures of historical interest in the townland are

1. An earthen ringfort.
2. An enclosure.
3. A crannog in Gortnaleck Lough.
4. A Lime kiln
