= Lissanover =

Townland in County Cavan, Ireland

Lissanover (from Irish Lios an Uabhair, The Fort of the Pride) is a townland in the civil parish of Templeport, County Cavan, Ireland. It lies in the Roman Catholic parish of Templeport and barony of Tullyhaw.

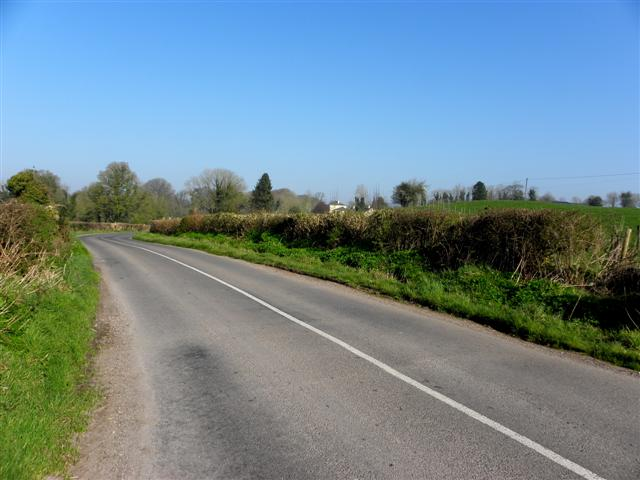
Road at Lissanover, Templeport, County Cavan

== Geography ==
Lissanover is bounded on the north by Keenagh, Templeport and Munlough South townlands, on the west by Cor, Templeport, Cloneary and Gortnaleck townlands, on the south by Kilnavert townland and on the east by Killycluggin, Tonyhallagh and Cavanaquill townlands. Its chief geographical features are streams, quarries, gravel pits and a spring well. Lissanover is traversed by a public road, several rural lanes and the disused Cavan and Leitrim Railway. The townland covers 299 statute acres.

== Etymology ==
The supposed derivation of the townland name The Fort of the Pride is given in a book published in 1875 The Origin and History of Irish Names of Places by Patrick Weston Joyce as follows-

Lissanover is the name of a place near the village of Bawnboy, in Cavan. The people there have a tradition that the castle was in former days held by a chieftain named Magauran, who was a merciless tyrant; and they tell that on one occasion he slew a priest on the altar for beginning Mass before he had arrived. This is believed to have given origin to the name Lios an Uabhair, the fort of pride.

A book published in 1912 entitled "Folk Tales of Breffny" by a Templeport author Mrs Augusta Wardell, née Hunt, under the pen name 'Bunda Hunt' gives another version of the tale in which a widow offers a traveler her last mug of milk (as her cow was ordered destroyed by a nearby king) and in return he blesses her with a cow which never ran dry.

== History ==
The earliest surviving mention of the townland name is Lissenovir, which appears in a document dated 28 November 1584 in the Carew Manuscripts. It reads as follows-

Indenture, 28 November, 27 Eliz., between Sir John Perrott, Lord Deputy General of Ireland, and the Council, and Sir John O'Rely of the Cavan in co. Cavan, commonly called O'Rely's country. O'Rely covenants to surrender in the Court of Chancery all the said country and the towghe called Clamahon, now the barony of Rathknavyn; the towghe of Castellrayne, now the barony of Castellrayne; the towghe of Loghety, called the barony of Cavan; the towghe of Tullaghegarvy, called the barony of Tollevyn; the towghe of both the Clankyes, called the barony of Ineskeyne; the towghe of the two towghes, called the barony of Clonballykernan; and the towghe of Tallaghaa, called the barony of Lissenovir, in the county aforesaid, when he shall be thereto required by the Governor. The Lord Deputy and Council agree that O'Rely shall have in fee simple the said baronies of Cavan and Tollevin, with the seigniories, rents, &c. of the baronies of Clonballekyran and Lisnovir. All the freeholders and inheritors in the same shall hold their lands of him by knight service. He shall receive the moiety or halfeindle of the lands and goods of felons, the moiety of the forfeiture of recognizances, the whole goods and chattels of persons outlawed, and goods wayed and strayed. These articles shall be established by Parliament. O'Rely shall suffer his brethren to enjoy all their lands in co. Cavan; and they to yield and pay all duties and charges to him and his heirs. He shall permit all persons who shall have by grant or agreement from her Majesty any portion of the rest of co. Cavan, otherwise called the Brengorely, to enjoy the portions granted to them. He will yield yearly one chief horse and 90 fat beeves, and serve at all roads, hostings, &c. with 20 horsemen and 40 footmen, either shot, kerne, or galloglasse, for 40 days. Nothing herein shall prejudice any lands belonging to the Queen, or to any lord spiritual or temporal, in the said county. (The word 'towghe' above is an Anglicisation of the Irish "tuath")

The 1938 Dúchas Schools' Folklore Collection describes local legends about Lissanover Castle.

On 19 January 1586 Queen Elizabeth I granted a pardon to Edmund m'Brien m'Thomas Magawran, of Lysenower, for fighting against the Queen's forces. He was brother to three successive chiefs of the clan, Brian Óg Mág Samhradháin, Tomas Óg mac Brian Mág Samhradháin and Feidhlimidh Mág Samhradháin.

On 9 June 1602 Elizabeth granted a pardon to Hugh m'Caher O Reyly, of Lysanovor, for fighting against the Queen's forces.

On 12 September 1603 King James VI and I granted a general pardon to Cormock McGawran, a yeoman of Lisinower, for fighting against the King's forces.

The 1609 Baronial Map depicts the townland as Lissenowre.

The 1652 Commonwealth Survey lists the townland as Lissanower.

The 1665 Down Survey map depicts it as Lisinore.

William Petty's 1685 map depicts it as Lismore.

In the Plantation of Ulster by grant dated 4 June 1611, along with other lands, King James VI and I granted the four polls of Lissanover to Bryan McShane O'Reyly.

Bryan McShane O'Reyly then sold the townland to John Chapman. An Inquisition of King Charles I of England held in Belturbet on 12 June 1661 gives a history of the occupation of Lissanore after the sale. It was occupied first by John Chapman and his eldest son Robert (along with other lands in Templeport). By deed dated 29 October 1639 they sold Lessenore to John's youngest son William Chapman for £100. William Chapman died on 1 May 1647. He left the land to his brother Robert who died on 1 August 1649. Robert's wife Elizabeth was still alive in 1661 but he had left the land to his two spinster daughters, Jane and Bridget, who were of full age in 1647. Bridget Chapman died on 1 May 1661. The 1652 Commonwealth Survey lists the townland as belonging to Lieutenant John Blackforde and on 1 May 1659 Jane and Bridget Chapman sold their interest in Lissonoror to said John Blachford for £120. John Blachford was born in 1598 in Ashmore, Dorset, England, the son of Richard and Frances Blachford. He became a merchant in Dorchester, Dorset but fled to France in 1633 when facing a warrant from the Exchequer for not paying customs. He married Mary Renald from Devon and died at Lissanover in 1661 and was buried at St. Orvins in Dublin (probably St. Audoen's Church, Dublin (Church of Ireland)) despite wishing to be buried back in Dorchester. His will was published on 9 January 1665 leaving his son John Blachford as his sole heir. He had sons John, Thomas, Ambrose and William (who became a Major) and daughters Mary and Frances. Major William Blachford was born in 1658 and died at Lissanover on 28 March 1727.

In the Hearth Money Rolls compiled on 29 September 1663 there were three Hearth Tax payers in Lissenower, John Blatcheford, Peter Rottenberry and William Towse. Blatcheford had two hearths, which indicated a larger house than others in the townland.

On 3 Feb 1699 William Blachford of Lisanover, Templeport was appointed High Sheriff of Cavan

== 1641 Rebellion ==
In the Irish Rebellion of 1641 Eleanor Reynolds of Lissanore made a deposition about the rebellion in Lissanover as follows-

Ellenor Reinolds of Late of Lissanore in the County of Cauan widow aged 46 yeares or thereabouts duly sworne etc. saith that one Gillernoo mc Gowran of Kildoe Co. Cavan aforesaid, Hugh mc Manus oag mc Gowran of the same gent, Hugh oag mc Hugh mc Gowran with divers others to the number of about 300 hauing been in the night of the 24th of October 1641 at divers houses of the English inhabitants in the parish of Dromlane and robbed & stripped them of all their goods & wearing clothes they came the next morning to this deponents dwelling house and lands at Lissanore & then & there robbed & tooke away with them 71 Cowes, besides many yong Cattle, eleuen stoodd mares & other horses & Colts to the value of £200 & upwards & carryed them from the said land. The night following also there came to this deponents house Tirlogh o Reily a deputy sub sheriff to one Laughlin Bane, and Hugh mc Hugh mc Manus mc Gowran aforesaid Thomas mc Ooney mc Gowran, and Cormack mc Gowran of Munlogh uncle to the said Thomas Ooney mc Gowran and divers other Rebels to the number of three of or fower score, and there did abide drinking all night & often threatned to Murther this deponents husband and her father, which they often said they would doe & did attempt it but by fortune the Masse priest of the parish lodging there that night threatned them with Curses till they promised not to hurt them, but in the morning they plundered all the house & caried what was left by the former Rebells away with them. She further saith that the said Gillernooe did afterwards possesse himself of this deponents dwelling house & eleuen Reeks of hay, and a faire haggard full of Corne, as also her Corne in ground all worth at least £150 sterling and would not allow one peck of the said Corne to mainteine this deponent & her father, husband & family. She further saith that about a full moneth after the first rising one Charles mc Gouran of Ballimackgouran, Co. Cavan aforesaid came to the priests house situate neer this deponents dwelling house & thence tooke away 2 of this deponents trunks full of fine linen wearing apparell & plate & other goods & writings of great concernment, & broke open the said Trunks & made vse of the goods therin, though he had formerly engaged not to medle with them but to keep them safe for this deponent: whereby this deponent lost aboue £100 sterling. This deponent further saith that the aforesaid Tirlogh Rely and Hugh mc Hugh mc Manus oag mc Gowran sent divers Rogues to haue murthered this deponents husband & her father, but having some intelligence thereof they conveyed themselves to the said priests house where they were kept & hid for 14 daies till opportunity served to convey them to the Castle of Croghan. She further saith that in May 1642 this deponents mother not being able (because of age & weaknes) to goe to Croghan Castle was left behind with some of the tenants at Lissanore aforesaid, where she was about the tyme aforesaid barbarously murthered by one ffarell Groome mc Kellogher of CrossemacKellogher who confessed the said barbarous fact to divers persons that voluntarily did depose the same to be true. This deponent further saith that the said month of May 1642 she saw one Mr Richard Ash of Lissomean and one Loughlin bane mc Moister under sheriff of the County with divers other Rebels in armes & helping to besiege the Castle of Croghan. She further saith that the said Laughlin sent 2 or 3 Rogues about 3 daies before the first rising to this deponents said Land of Lissanore & thence they stolle a mare of this deponents & a 3 yeare old Colt worth £50; which Colt this deponent did see afterwards with the said Laughlin riding on him at the aforesaid tyme of besiedging of Croghan Castle, and that the said Mr Ash was riding on a white horse then with the said Laughlin as aforesaid. She further deposeth that about Midsomer 1642 the said Mr Ash did take from a Kinswoman of one ffrancis Sugden at Lissomean some parcells of plate by the way as the English were going towards Drogheda from Croghan Castle and Convoied by the said Ash with a great Company of Irish souldiers titherwards which was Contrary to the Conditions of quarter at the said Castle of Croghan agreed upon. And further she this Examinate deposeth not the marke [mark] of Ellenor Reinolds.

In the Irish Rebellion of 1641 William Reynolds of Lisnaore made a deposition about the rebellion in Lissanover as follows-

folio 260r William Reinoldes of Lisnaore in the parrish of Templeport in the County of Cavan gent sworne & examined deposeth and sajth That about the beginning of the presente Rebellion this deponent was deprived robbed or otherwise dispoiled & Lost by the Rebells: his meanes goodes & chattells concisting of horses mares beasts Cattle Corne hay howsholdstuff implements of husbandry apparell bookes provition silver spoones swyne & the benefite of his howse and six Poles of Land: due debts & other thinges of the value of three hundredth Sixtie fowre Powndes nine shillings sterling. And further sajth That the Rebells that soe robbed & dispojled him of his personall estate are theis that follow vizt Gillernew Mc Gawren & Hugh mc Manus oge mc Gawren both of the Parrish and County of Cavan aforesaid Turlaghe o Rely Brian Groome mc Gowren Daniell mc Gawren & Charles mc Gawren all of the place aforesaid gent: with divers other Rebells whose names he cannott expresse to the number of 30 or thereabouts And further sajth that theis 4 parties next after named (being duly indebted to this deponent) are or lately were in actuall Rebellion & carry armes with for & amongst the Rebells against his Maiesty and his loyall Subjects vizt ffarrell mc Gawren of the parish of Killiney & County aforesaid gent Cornelius ô Sheriden of in the County of ffermanagh gent, William Greames & Phelim mc Gowren both of Templeporte aforesaid gentlemen: And alsoe saith that the parties hereafter mencioned are or lately were alsoe actors in the same present Rebellion & carried armes & did take parts & assist the Rebells vizt ffarrell Broome mc Kallaghan of the Parrish of Templeport Wanderer: whoe as this deponent hath beene credibly tould murthered this deponents owne mother) Phillipp mc Hugh mc Shane o Rely of Ballinecargie in the County of Cavan Esquire now a Colonell of Rebells Capt Myles o Rely his brother Edmund Mc Mulmore o Rely of or nere Ballirely gent & Myles his sonn whoe when the Rebellion began was high sheriff of the said County of Cavan Phillip mc Mulmore o Rely of Ballytrusse Esquire John ô Rely his sonne & heire Sergeant Maio{r} Hugh Boy o Rely, Connor o Rely of Agheraskilly gent, Edmund mc Kernon of the Parrish of Kildallon gent & Edmund his sonn, & William another of his sons; William Greames of Templeport gentleman Owney Sheredin of the parrish of Kilmore gent, Andrew Mc Gowran of Templeport ffarrell mc Acorby of the same & James Brady of the same parrish gent; Cohonaghe Maguire of Aghloone gent Manus ô Mulmoghery of Aghloone aforesaid yeoman Turlogh mc Brian of Vrhoonoghe yeoman: Shane mc Brian of Killsallough, a popish Priest; ffarrell mc Adeggin of Aghavanny yeoman Owen Mc Adeggan of the same & Daniell mc Gowran of Gortneleck gent & Edmund his sonn: & divers others whose names & places of aboad he cannott Remember William Reynolds Jur 6o Apr 1643 Will: Aldrich Hen: Brereton John Sterne: Cavan William Reinolds Jur 6o Apr 1643 Intw Cert fact [Copy at MS 832, fols 59r-59v]

== Landowners since 1700 ==
A deed dated 18 June 1724 includes William Blachford and Farrell McKeirnan, both of Lissnover & Lisnover.

A deed dated 10 May 1744 spells the name as Lisnover.

In the Templeport Poll Book of 1761 there was one person registered to vote in Lissanover in the 1761 Irish general election - Thomas Blashford who lived in Ballymagauran but who also had a freehold in Lissanover. He was entitled to two votes. The four election candidates were Charles Coote, 1st Earl of Bellomont and Lord Newtownbutler (later Brinsley Butler, 2nd Earl of Lanesborough), both of whom were then elected Member of Parliament for Cavan County. The losing candidates were George Montgomery (MP) of Ballyconnell and Barry Maxwell, 1st Earl of Farnham. Blashford voted for Newtownbutler and Coote. Absence from the poll book either meant a resident did not vote or more likely was not a freeholder entitled to vote, which would mean most of the inhabitants of Lissanover.

In the Fermanagh Poll of Electors 1788 there was one Lissanover resident, Robert Hume, who was entitled to vote as he owned land in Lisnaknock townland in Galloon parish.

The 1790 Cavan Carvaghs list spells the name as Lissonover.

In the 1825 Registry of Freeholders for County Cavan there was one freeholder registered in Lissanover- William Blashford. He had no landlord as he owned the fee simple himself. His holding was valued at upwards of £50.

The Tithe Applotment Books for 1826 list four tithepayers in the townland.

In 1833 one person in Lissanover was registered as a keeper of weapons- John Roycroft.

The Ordnance survey Namebooks for 1836 state- There is a gentleman's seat near the centre of the townland with a large orchard garden...it was formerly a place of great repute and the family seat of the Magaurans.

The Lissanover Valuation Office Field books are available for 1839-1841.

Griffith's Valuation of 1857 lists four landholders in the townland.

== Census ==
Year	Population	Males	Females	Total Houses	Uninhabited
1841	43	23	20	5	0
1851	27	10	17	6	0
1861	23	9	14	5	0
1871	15	7	8	5	1
1881	16	6	10	5	1
1891	10	6	4	2	0

In the 1901 census of Ireland, there are five families listed in the townland.

In the 1911 census of Ireland, there are eleven families listed in the townland.

== Antiquities ==
1. The ruined castle of Lissanover.
2. An earthen ringfort.
3. An Iron Age Ring-Barrow or Tumulus.
4. A Late Neolithic or Early Bronze Age Stone circle
5. A Bronze Age Stone row
6. A Bronze Age Stone row
7. An Early Bronze Age gold lunula was found in Lissanover in 1909 and is now in the National Museum of Ireland.
8. Three stone axes were found in the townland
9. Lissanover National School. 1862: Eliza Smyth was the headmistress, a Protestant. There were 65 pupils, all Church of Ireland apart from 8 who were Roman Catholic. The Church of England Scriptures, Catechism and Sacred Poetry was taught to the Protestant pupils on weekdays from 2:30pm to 3:30pm and on Saturdays from 12:30 to 1:30pm.
