= James J. McGovern =

- Education: Iona College, BS Rensselaer Polytechnic Institute, MS New York University, PhD
- Known for: Former president of AT Still University

James J. McGovern is an American academic, who served as president of A.T. Still University (ATSU) from 1997 to 2008. He was also a professor in the university's Department of Family Medicine and Community Health.

== Biography ==
A New York native, McGovern earned a bachelor's degree from Iona College and a master's degree from the Rensselaer Polytechnic Institute, both in New York. He completed his doctorate degree from the Department of Administrative and Organizational Studies, New York University, in 1973.

McGovern, a physics professor, served in high administrative positions at Case Western Reserve University in Cleveland, Ohio; Virginia Commonwealth University in Richmond, Virginia; the Illinois and Connecticut Boards of Higher Education; and the State University of New York. He was also the director of health finance for the state of Illinois, and the director of the Issues Analysis Institute, part of the State University of New York.

McGovern was appointed president of the Kirksville College of Osteopathic Medicine in 1997, and went on to found the A.T. Still University of Health Sciences and five more graduate schools: the Arizona School of Health Sciences (1999), the School of Health Management (2000), the Arizona School of Dentistry and Oral Health (2001), the School of Osteopathic Medicine in Arizona (2006), and the Postgraduate School of Osteopathic Clinic Research (2007). A proposal for a Ph.D. program was submitted in December 2007 as part of the last school.

In 2003, he co-authored Your Healer Within: A Unified Field Theory for Healthcare, with his wife, Rene McGovern, an ATSU professor of neurobehavioral sciences. The book’s release coincided with a 2,000-square-foot (190 m^{2}) traveling ATSU exhibit on wellness featured at the Smithsonian Arts and Industries Building in Washington, D.C., and has been translated into several foreign languages.

During his presidency, ATSU increased from 600 to over 3,000 students, approximately quadrupled its endowment and tripled its sponsored research. McGovern oversaw the development of a new campus with several buildings in Mesa, Arizona, an Information Technologies Center in Kirksville, Missouri, and the establishment of an Interdisciplinary Research Committee which led to the institution receiving its first National Institutes of Health research awards. He retired from the presidency of the university in 2008.

He is currently on the Board of the Chandler-Gilbert Community College, chairman of the board of the National Municipal Advisors and president of the National Center for Green Care, a resource and research center for autistic, developmental, and senior cognitive disabilities.

== Awards and professional memberships ==
McGovern has received awards and certificates from organizations including the Virginia Center on Aging, the Virginia Hospital Research and Education Foundation, the University of Chicago Healthcare Institute, Stanford University Management Institute, Northwestern University Executive Management Institute, the Mercy Health Care Foundation, and Illinois Association of Retarded Citizens.

He was a member the New York Academy of Sciences, Virginia Academy of Science, American College of Healthcare Executives, Association of American Medical Colleges, Group on Institutional Planning, College and University Systems Exchange, Healthcare Financial Management Association, and the American Association of University Administrators.
