= Coologe =

Townland in County Cavan, Ireland

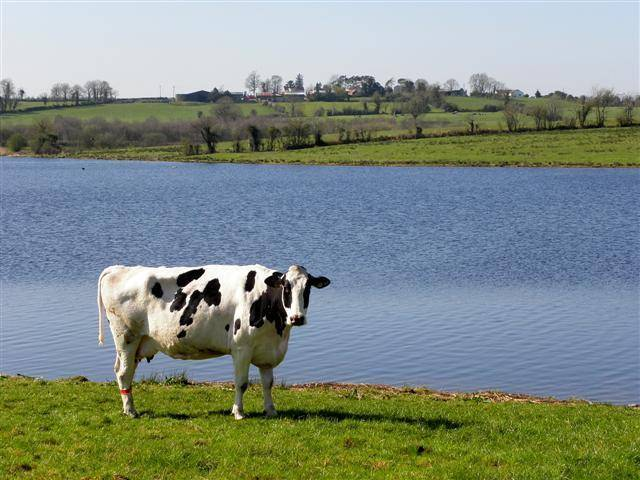
Coologe Lake, County Cavan

Coologe (Irish derived place name either: Cúl Ó nGuaire meaning 'Guaire's Corner' or Cúl Ó Gabhair meaning "The Corner of the Goats") is a townland in the civil parish of Templeport, County Cavan, Ireland. It lies in the Roman Catholic parish of Templeport and barony of Tullyhaw.

== Geography ==
Coologe is bounded on the north by Toberlyan Duffin townland, on the west by Toberlyan and Derrycassan townland, on the south by Burren townland and by Kiltynaskellan townland in Kildallan parish and on the east by Callaghs and Killarah townlands in Kildallan parish. Its chief geographical features are Coologe Lake and the Shannon–Erne Waterway. Coologe is traversed by a public road and several rural lanes. The townland covers 265 statute acres.

== History ==
In medieval times, the Mac Shamhráin (McGovern or Magauran) túath of Tullyhaw was divided into economic taxation areas called ballibetoes, from the Irish Baile Biataigh (Anglicized as 'Ballybetagh'), meaning 'A Provisioner's Town or Settlement'. The original purpose was to enable the farmer, who controlled the baile, to provide hospitality for those who needed it, such as poor people and travellers. The ballybetagh was further divided into townlands farmed by individual families who paid a tribute or tax to the head of the ballybetagh, who in turn paid a similar tribute to the clan chief. The steward of the ballybetagh would have been the secular equivalent of the erenagh in charge of church lands. There were seven ballibetoes in the parish of Templeport. Coologe was located in the ballybetagh of Bally Cooleigie (alias 'Bally Cowleg'), which was named after the townland.

The 1836 Ordnance Survey Namebooks give the Irish version of the townland as 'Cuileóg', meaning "A Little Corner" . However the earlier texts differ. A poem, composed about 1290 A.D. in the Book of Magauran (Poem 2, verse 27), gives the name as Cúl Ó nGuaire, meaning "Guaire's Corner". Another possible meaning is Cúl Ó Gabhair, meaning "The Corner of the Goats".

Pleasant is the home of the hero of Botha,
Sheltering the scion of Conn and Corc from wind and rain
Coologe is no place to be raided,
It is a castle whose commands are the most steadily obeyed in the world.
(Suairc ionadh longphoirt laoich Bhoth,
ar ghaoith d'ua ChonnChuirc 's ar chioth
Cúl ó nGuaire ní cúl creach,
dún na mbreath bhus bhuaine ar bioth).

Coologe was the residence of the Mac Shamhráin (McGovern or Magauran) chiefs of Tullyhaw in medieval times before they moved to Ballymagauran in the 1400s.

The Annals of the Four Masters under the year 1298 state: Brian Breaghach the Bregian Magauran, Chief of Teallach-Eachdhacih Tullyhaw, was slain by Hugh Breitneach O'Conor, and the Clann-Murtough.

The Annals of Loch Cé under the year 1298 state: Brian Bregach Mac Shamhradhain, chieftain of Tellach-Echach, the most bountiful and puissant man that was in his own time, was slain by Aedh Breifnech O'Conchobhair and the Clann-Muirchertaigh, in his own house at Cuil-O'Guaire, on the third day of summer (Brian bregach Mag Shamradhan, taisech Tellaigh Echach, fer rob ferr enech agus engnum do bhí na aimsir fein, do mharbad la h-Oedh mBreiffnech Hui Conchobair, agus la Clainn Muirchertaigh, na thigh fein a Cúil O nGuaire in tres lá do shamradh).

The Annals of Connacht 1298 state: Brian Bregach Mag Samradain, chieftain of Tullyhaw, the most generous and valorous man of his time, was killed by Aed Brefnech O Conchobair and the Clan Murtagh in his own house at Coologe on the third day of summer (Brian Bregach Mag Samradan toisech Tellaig Echach, fer rob ferr enech & engnam bai ina amsir fein, do marbad la hAed mBrefnech hui Conchobair agus la Clainn Murcertaig na tig fein a Cuil hui nGuaire an tres la do tSamrad.). Poem 4 in the Book of Magauran laments Brian's death when the castle was burned.

On 19 January 1586, Queen Elizabeth I of England granted a pardon to Phelim m'Brien m'Thomas Magawran, of Colleaghe, for fighting against the Queen's forces (Under his Irish name Feidhlimidh Mág Samhradháin; he later became Chief of the McGoverns and built Ballymagauran Castle. He died 20 January 1622).

Until the Cromwellian Act for the Settlement of Ireland 1652, the modern townland of Toberlyan formed part of the modern townland of Coologe, as one of its subdivisions. Another subdivision of Coologe was the modern townland of Toberlyan Duffin. Therefore, neither of the Toberlyans are depicted on the 1609 Baronial or 1665 Down Survey maps.

The 1609 Baronial Map depicts the townland as Coleag. The 1665 Down Survey map depicts it as Cooleoge. Sir William Petty's 1685 map depicts it as Coolorg.

In the Hearth Money Rolls compiled on 29 September 1663 there were two Hearth Tax payers in Coolege- Nola Ny Conell and Neale O Doan.

A grant dated 3 June 1667 from King Charles II to Colonel Thomas Coote included part of Cooleoge with an area of 59 acres and 32 perches at an annual rent of £0-15s-11 3/4d. A grant dated 9 September 1669 from King Charles II to the 1st Earl of Anglesey included part of Cooleoge with an area of 23 acres and 26 perches at an annual rent of £0-6s-2 1/2d.

The aforesaid Colonel Thomas Coote died on 25 November 1671 and his lands went to his nephew, Thomas Coote.

On 8 September 1716, the said nephew Thomas Coote leased land to Edward Ellis, which included the lands of Cuiliege alias Burren.

A deed dated 19 Mar 1768 by the family of the aforesaid Edward Ellis included the lands of Cuiluge alias Burren.

A lease dated 22 September 1776 was made between John, Francis, William and Patrick Bannan of Coologe, concerning the lands of Garradice beg."Memorial extract — Registry of Deeds Index Project: Memorial No: 229387". Registry of Deeds Index Project Ireland.

The Tithe Applotment Books for 1827 list twelve tithepayers in the townland.

The Ordnance Survey Name Books for 1836 give the following description of the townland-The whole of the east, south and a great part of the west of the townland is bounded by a large river and lake.

The Coologe Valuation Office Field books are available for November 1839.

In 1841 the population of the townland was 82, being 46 males and 36 females. There were sixteen houses in the townland, all of which were inhabited. A rare surviving page from the 1841 census of Ireland lists the household of Michael Bannon of Coologe.

In 1851 the population of the townland was 92, being 52 males and 40 females. There were fourteen houses in the townland, all inhabited.

Griffith's Valuation of 1857 lists sixteen landholders in the townland.

In 1861 the population of the townland was 78, being 44 males and 34 females. There were seventeen houses in the townland and all were inhabited.

In 1871 the population of the townland was 36, being 17 males and 19 females. There were twelve houses in the townland, all were inhabited.

In 1881 the population of the townland was 39, being 18 males and 21 females. There were eleven houses in the townland, all were inhabited.

In 1891 the population of the townland was 42, being 20 males and 22 females. There were eleven houses in the townland, of which one was uninhabited.

In the 1901 census of Ireland, there are fourteen families listed in the townland.

In the 1911 census of Ireland, there are eleven families listed in the townland.

== Antiquities ==
1. An earthen ringfort on the shore of the lake which is probably the site of the McGovern Chief's residence referred to above. Poem 1 in the Book of Magauran describes what the castle looked like about 1290 A.D.
2. A crannóg in the lake, 100 metres from the shore;
3. A medieval quern-stone was found in the townland.
4. A pair of twisted bronze tubes with punched decoration, found in Coologe Lough.

== See also ==
- Brian ‘Breaghach’ Mág Samhradháin
