= Brian Óg Mág Samhradháin =

Brian Óg Mág Samhradháin, the Third, (anglicised Brian McGovern Junior) d. 1584, was chief of the McGovern Clan and Baron or Lord of Tullyhaw barony, County Cavan until his death in 1584.

== Ancestry ==
His ancestry was Brian Óg son of Brian son of Tomás (died 1532) son of Maghnus (died 1497) son of Tomás Óg (died 1494) son of Tomás na Feasoige (died 1458) son of Fearghal (died 1393) son of Tomás (died 1343) son of Brian ‘Breaghach’ Mág Samhradháin (died 1298). He was the eldest son and had two brothers who both later succeeded him as chiefs of the clan, Tomas Óg Mág Samhradháin and Feidhlimidh Mág Samhradháin, together with a third brother Emonn of Lissanover.

== Chieftainship ==
On the death of the McGovern chief, Brian Óg took the chieftaincy and moved to the chief's residence in Ballymagauran.

== Death ==
The Annals of Loch Cé for 1584 state-

Mac Samhradhain, i.e., Brian Og, son of Brian, died this year.

== Family ==
Brian Óg had at least one son, Brian, who died on 1 October 1631. On 30 April 1605 King James VI and I granted a pardon to him as Brian McGaran of Tolaghagh, for fighting against the King's forces. In the Plantation of Ulster by grant dated 4 June 1611, King James VI and I granted two polls of Owingallis and two polls of Tewbay, being 200 acres at an annual rent of £2-2s-8d to Breene Og Magauran, gentleman. An Inquisition held in Cavan Town on 24 October 1631 found that the said Brian Óg McGovern by deed of trust dated 20 November 1614 granted the lands of Lissconnaught, comprising 2 polls in Owengallees, 2 polls in Teeboy townland in Corlough parish and a half poll in Bartonny, to the use of himself and his wife Mary O'Birn and after their death for their son Edmond McGovern, born in 1616.

Preceded by Uaithne Mág Samhradháin	Chief of McGovern clan 15??–1584 AD	Succeeded by Tomas Óg Mág Samhradháin
