= Tomas Óg mac Brian Mág Samhradháin =

Tomás Óg Mág Samhradháin (anglicised Thomas McGovern Junior) was chief of the McGovern Clan and Baron or Lord of Tullyhaw barony, County Cavan from 1584 until his death at the end of the 16th century.

== Ancestry ==
His ancestry was Tomás Óg son of Brian son of Tomás (d. 1532) son of Maghnus (d. 1497) son of Tomás Óg (d. 1494) son of Tomás na Feasoige (d. 1458) son of Fearghal (d. 1393) son of Tomás (d. 1343) son of Brian ‘Breaghach’ Mág Samhradháin (d. 1298). He was the second eldest son and had two brothers who both were chiefs of the clan, Brian Óg Mág Samhradháin and Feidhlimidh Mág Samhradháin, together with a third brother Emonn of Lissanover.

== Chieftainship ==
On the death of the McGovern chief, Brian Óg Mág Samhradháin in 1584, Tomás took the chieftaincy and moved to the chief's residence in Ballymagauran.

== Coffey Magaurans ==
A sub-sept of the McGoverns known as the Coffey Magaurans, centered on the northern part of Tullyhaw called Largay (now the town of Blacklion) seemed to be exercising a degree of independence from the main chieftaincy at Ballymagauran as, in an Indenture dated 1585 between the Lord Deputy of Ireland John Perrot and, inter alia, Turlough McGovern of Largay, the said Turlough claimed to be chief of the McGoverns. The indenture reads-

This Indenture betwixte Perrotte, Lord Deputy Generall of Ireland, for and on the behaulfe of the Queene's most excellent Majesty of the one partye, and John Garvey, bishop of Kilmore; Lysaghe O'Ferrall, bishop of Ardaghe; Sir Briane O'Royrke of Dromahire, knt.; Cahall MConnor Carragh Magrannyll of Inishmurryne, otherwise called Magrannell of Moynishe, chiefe of his name; Tirlaghe M'Molaghline oge Magrannyll of Dromarde, otherwise called Magrannyle of Clonmologhlyne, chief of his name; Tyrelaghe Magawryne of the Largine, chief of his name; Teige oge Maglanchie of Rossclogher, chief of his name; Owyne MThelline O'Royrke of the Carre; Rory McEnawe of Inyshimylerye, chiefe of his name; Melaghlyne McOwyne McMurrye of Loghmoyltagher; Farrell MTernan of Cloyloghe; Bryan McLoghlyne of the Fayhee; Phelyne Glasse of Cloncorycke; Wonye MacSheane O'Royrke of Lloghnecouhye and Tyernane O'Royrke of Dromahyre of the other parte.

Turlough McGovern's genealogy was Turlough son of Cobhthach (the Coffey after whom the Coffey McGoverns are named) son of Aodh son of Tomás Maol son of Feidhlimidh son of Donnchadh Ballach (d. 1445) son of Fearghal Mág Samhradháin, chief of the McGovern Clan from 1359 until his death in 1393. The Annals of the Four Masters for 1593 state-

A warlike dissension arose in the month of May in this year between Sir George Bingham of Ballymote and Brian-na-Samhthach, i.e. Brian Oge, the son of Brian, son of Brian, son of Owen O'Rourke. The cause of this dissension was, that a part of the Queen's rent had not been received out of Breifny on that festival, Brian O'Rourke asserting that all the rents not paid were those demanded for lands that were waste, and that he Bingham ought not to demand rent for waste lands until they should be inhabited. Sir George sent soldiers into Breifny to take a prey in lieu of the rent; and the soldiers seized on O'Rourkes own milch cows. Brian went to demand a restoration of them, but this he did not at all receive. He then returned home, and sent for mercenaries and hireling troops to Tyrone, Tirconnell, and Fermanagh; and after they had come to him, he set out, and he made no delay by day or by night until he arrived at Ballymote. On his arrival in the neighbourhood of the town, he dispersed marauding parties through the two cantreds of the Mac Donoughs, namely, Corann and Tirerrill; and there was not much of that country which he did not plunder on the excursion. He also burned on that day thirteen villages on every side of Ballymote; and he ravaged Ballymote itself more than he did any other town. Their losses were of little account, except the son of Coffey Roe Magauran, on the side of Brian; Gilbert Grayne, a gentleman of Sir George's people, who was slain on the other side. The son of O'Rourke then returned back to his own territory loaded with great preys and spoils. This was done in the first month of summer.

Turlough's territory was an escape route after the Battle of the Ford of the Biscuits.

The Annals of the Four Masters for 1594 state-

O'Donnell, as we have stated, was encamped, laying siege to Enniskillen, from the middle of June to the month of August, until the warders of the castle had consumed almost all their provisions. Messengers came to O'Donnell from the Scots, whom he had before invited over, to inform him that they had arrived at Derry. And those who had come thither were Donnell Gorm Mac Donnell, and Mac Leod of Ara. O'Donnell then set out with a small number of his forces to hire them; and he left another large party of them with Maguire to assist him, and he ordered them to remain blockading the castle. When the Lord Justice, Sir William Fitzwilliam, had received intelligence that the warders of Enniskillen were in want of stores and provisions, he ordered a great number of the men of Meath, and of the gentlemen of the Reillys and the Binghams of Connaught, under the conduct of George Oge Bingham, to convey provisions to Enniskillen. These chieftains, having afterwards met together, went to Cavan, O'Reilly's town, for provisions; and they proceeded through Fermanagh, keeping Lough Erne on the right, until they arrived within about four miles of the town. When Maguire (Hugh) received intelligence that these forces were marching towards the town with the aforesaid provisions, he set out with his own forces and the forces left him by O'Donnell, together with Cormac, the son of the Baron, i.e. the brother of the Earl O'Neill; and they halted at a certain narrow pass, to which they thought they the enemy would come to them. The ambuscade was successful, for they came on, without noticing any thing, until they fell in with Maguire's people at the mouth of a certain ford. A fierce and vehement conflict, and a spirited and hard-contested battle, was fought between both parties, till at length Maguire and his forces routed the others by dint of fighting, and a strages of heads was left to him; and the rout was followed up a great way from that place. A countless number of nobles and plebeians fell in this conflict. Many steeds, weapons, and other spoils, were left behind in that place by the defeated, besides the steeds and horses that were loaded with provisions, on their way to Enniskillen. A few fugitives of Meath and of the Reillys escaped from this conflict, and never stopped until they arrived in Breifny O'Reilly. The route taken by George Oge Bingham and the few who escaped with him from the field was through the Largan, the territory of the Clann-Coffey Magauran, through Breifny O'Rourke, and from thence to Sligo. The name of the ford at which this great victory was gained was changed to Bel-atha-na-mBriosgadh, from the number of biscuits and small cakes left there to the victors on that day. When the warders of the castle heard of the defeat of the army, they surrendered the castle to Maguire; and he gave them pardon and protection.

== Elizabethan Wars ==
Tomás is mentioned in the Fiants of 19 January 1586 when Queen Elizabeth I of England granted a pardon to Tho. oge m'Brien m'Tho. Magawran, of Magawranstowne, for fighting against the Queen's forces.

Tomás paid little heed to the terms of the pardon as he then joined in a rebellion in Connacht but the rebellion was defeated at the end of July 1586. The costs of the rebellion to the English government were covered by cattle seizures and fines. The Governor of Connacht, Sir Richard Bingham (soldier) wrote about Tomás to the Lord Deputy of Ireland, Sir John Perrot on 19 August 1586 to as follows-

From whence I will also go to M'Gawran, lying between O'Rourke and Maguire, and cause him to submit himself, and yield composition for his land, or else I will give him a wipe of a thousand cows, wherein your Lordship shall not, I hope, mislike my doings.

== Death ==
John O'Hart in his book Irish Pedigrees; or the Origin and Stem of the Irish Nation, p. 414, mentions a Baron MacGauran in an incident that occurred at Kilnavert Church c.1590. The Baron was probably Tomás Óg.

Bryan Dolan came with his two sons Cormac and Charles to the neighbourhood of Ballymagauran, near the end of the sixteenth century. A bad time it was for priests and papists; yet, notwithstanding, Cormac and Charles rode on Sunday mornings to Killnavart, to hear Mass, a distance of some ten or twelve miles; and, having come there, they attached their horses by their bridle-reins to the branches of trees near the chapel. Baron MacGauran was then Earl of Tullaghagh, and heard Mass at Killnavart. He observed the two strange young men at Mass, and their horses tied by their bridles to trees near the chapel; he enquired to whom the horses belonged, and where the owners were from. Having been informed on those points, the Baron invited the young men to dinner on the following Sunday; and soon afterwards proffered them a residence in the neighbourhood of Ballymagauran, and they willingly accepted the invitation. Almost immediately afterwards Cormac Dolan, the elder son, married a near relative of the Baron,—the daughter of Terence MacGauran, who was better known as Trealach Caoch or "Blind Terry," in consequence of his being squint-eyed. But the Baron's hospitality and Dolan's marriage became a great misfortune to both parties. In due time after the marriage a son was born to Cormac Dolan; about the same time another child was born for Baron MacGauran, who claimed that his relative Cormac Dolan's wife and daughter of Blind Terry should nurse his (the Baron's) child. Bryan Dolan took this demand as a great insult: he instructed his daughter-in-law to say that he had not come so low that she should become a "hippin-washer" to any man. This message enraged the Baron to madness; he at once rode to Dolan's house, called for the old man, whom he seized by the hair of the head and dragged him by the horse's side at full gallop, and threw him dead on the road. The sons Cormac and Charles seeing the Baron gallop furiously to their house, and immediately galloping back dragging something by his horse's side, one said to the other "the Baron is dragging something after him;" the other exclaimed with an oath "it is my father," and, snapping up a gun that lay near, he rushed to the road and shot the Baron dead on the spot. Old Dolan and the Baron were just buried when the relatives and retainers of the Baron came at night, broke into Dolan's dwelling, and killed the brothers Cormac and Charles. Cormac's wife exclaimed, were there none of the friends of Blind Terry there? They spared her and her child, whose name was Rodger, and reared him up as one of themselves.

== Family ==
Tomás had four children, a daughter Wony or Una and three sons, of whom the eldest was Cormac Mág Samhradháin. In the Plantation of Ulster the lands of Garrerishmore, one poll; Dufferagh, one poll; Killanaigy, one poll and half the poll of Meligg; in all, 175 acres at an annual rent of £1-17s-4d., were granted to the four children jointly.

Preceded by Brian Óg Mág Samhradháin	Chief of McGovern clan 1584–15?? AD	Succeeded by Feidhlimidh Mág Samhradháin
