= Cloncurkney =

Townland in County Cavan, Ireland

Coordinates: 54.0974°N 7.6896°W

Cloncurkney (from Irish Cluain Chúircne meaning Cuircne's Meadow') is a townland in the civil parish of Templeport, County Cavan, Ireland. It lies in the Roman Catholic parish of Templeport and barony of Tullyhaw.

== Geography ==
Cloncurkney is bounded on the north by Mullaghmore, Templeport and Kildoagh townlands, on the west by Gowlagh South townland, on the south by Gortaclogher townland and on the east by Corboy Glebe townland. Its chief geographical features are Bellaboy Lough (Irish = Loch Béal Átha Buí = The Lake of the Entrance to the Yellow Ford), a stream, a wood and a spring well. Cloncurkney is traversed by minor roads and rural lanes. The townland covers 151 statute acres.

== History ==
In medieval times the McGovern barony of Tullyhaw was divided into economic taxation areas called ballibetoes, from the Irish Baile Biataigh (Anglicized as 'Ballybetagh'), meaning 'A Provisioner's Town or Settlement'. The original purpose was to enable the farmer, who controlled the baile, to provide hospitality for those who needed it, such as poor people and travellers. The ballybetagh was further divided into townlands farmed by individual families who paid a tribute or tax to the head of the ballybetagh, who in turn paid a similar tribute to the clan chief. The steward of the ballybetagh would have been the secular equivalent of the erenagh in charge of church lands. There were seven ballibetoes in the parish of Templeport. Cloncurkney was located in the ballybetagh of Bally Gortnekargie (Irish Baile Gort na Carraige, meaning 'The Town of the Rock Field').

Up until the 19th century Cloncurkney also included the modern townland of Mullaghmore, Templeport as a subdivision.

The 1609 Ulster Plantation Baronial Map depicts the townland as Clonquirkin.

The 1652 Commonwealth Survey lists the townland as Clooncuirkny.

The 1665 Down Survey map depicts it as Clonquirke.

William Petty's 1685 map depicts it as Clonquirk.

In the Plantation of Ulster by grant dated 27 February 1610, King James VI and I granted, inter alia, one poll of Clonkurke to Donell Mc Owen O'Reyly, gentleman.

The O'Reilly lands in Cloncurkney were confiscated in the Cromwellian Act for the Settlement of Ireland 1652 and were distributed as follows:

The 1652 Commonwealth Survey lists the proprietor as Lieutenant Arthur Newborogh and the tenant as John Trench, both of whom appear in other Templeport townlands in the same survey.

In the Hearth Money Rolls compiled on 29 September 1663 there were three people paying the Hearth Tax in Clankuirke- Patricke O Loghan, Shane O Loghan and Donogh McManus

A grant dated 7 July 1669 from King Charles II of England to John Skeffington, the 2nd Viscount Massereene included, inter alia, lands of Clounequirke containing 23 acres 1 rood and 36 perches profitable land and 15 acres of unprofitable land.

A lease dated 6 April 1710 between Morley Saunders, Farrell Deane and Patrick Enery lists, inter alia, the lands of Cluncurkne.

A deed by Thomas Enery dated 29 Jan 1735 includes the lands of Cloncurkney.

A deed by John Enery dated 13 December 1774 includes the lands of Cluncurkney otherwise Clunkurkney.

The 1790 Cavan Carvaghs list spells the name as Cloncurkne.

The Tithe Applotment Books for 1827 list five tithepayers in the townland.

The Cloncurkney Valuation Office Field books are available for 1839-1840.

Griffith's Valuation of 1857 lists twenty eight landholders in the townland.

== Census ==
Year	Population	Males	Females	Total Houses	Uninhabited
1841	62	31	31	8	0
1851	48	27	21	8	0
1861	38	19	19	7	0
1871	32	18	14	6	0
1881	23	12	11	4	0
1891	17	10	7	4	0

In the 1901 census of Ireland, there are seven families listed in the townland, and in the 1911 census of Ireland, there are eight families listed in the townland.

== Antiquities ==
The only structures of historical interest in the townland are footbridges over the stream.
