= Gowlagh South =

Townland in the civil parish of Templeport, County Cavan, Ireland

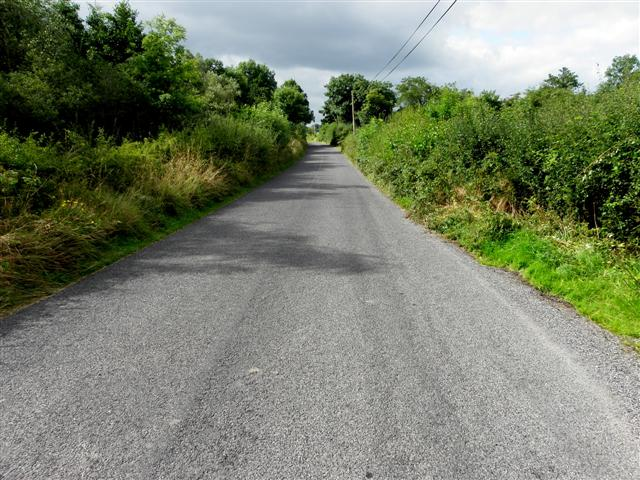
Road at Gowlagh South (geograph 3610794)

Gowlagh South (from Irish Gabhlach meaning 'The Fork' [of The River Blackwater]) is a townland in the civil parish of Templeport, County Cavan, Ireland. It lies in the Catholic parish of Templeport and barony of Tullyhaw.

== Geography ==
Gowlagh South is bounded on the north by Mullaghmore, Templeport townland, on the west by Owengallees townland, on the south by Boley, Templeport and Gortaclogher townlands and on the east by Cloncurkney townland. Its chief geographical features are the River Blackwater, County Cavan, bogs and spring wells. It is called Gowlagh South to distinguish it from Gowlagh North townland at the foot of Slieve Rushen mountain, with which it has no connection. Gowlagh South is traversed by the L1037 road, minor public roads and rural lanes. The townland covers 165 statute acres.

== History ==
In medieval times the McGovern barony of Tullyhaw was divided into economic taxation areas called ballibetoes, from the Irish Baile Biataigh (Anglicized as 'Ballybetagh'), meaning 'A Provisioner's Town or Settlement'. The original purpose was to enable the farmer, who controlled the baile, to provide hospitality for those who needed it, such as poor people and travellers. The ballybetagh was further divided into townlands farmed by individual families who paid a tribute or tax to the head of the ballybetagh, who in turn paid a similar tribute to the clan chief. The steward of the ballybetagh would have been the secular equivalent of the erenagh in charge of church lands. There were seven ballibetoes in the parish of Templeport. Gowlagh South was located in the ballybetagh of Bally Gortnekargie (Irish Baile Gort na Carraige, meaning 'The Town of Rock Field').

The 1609 Baronial Map depicts the townland as Gortneclogh.

The 1652 Commonwealth Survey spells the name as Gowlagh.

The 1665 Down Survey map depicts it as Gortnecloy.

William Petty's 1685 map depicts it as Gortcloy.

In the Plantation of Ulster by grant dated 13 March 1610, King James VI and I granted, inter alia, two polls of Gortneclogh and Gobeveany to Cahell M'Owen O Reyly. The said Cathal O'Reilly was the nephew of two chiefs of the O'Reilly clan- Aodh Connallach mac Maolmhordha who was chief from 1565 to 1583 and Eamonn mac Maolmhordha who was chief from 1596 to 1601. He was also a brother of Cathaoir O'Reilly who received lands in Kildoagh townland and first cousin of Donill Backagh McShane O'Reyly who was simultaneously granted lands in Burren (townland).

An Inquisition of King Charles I of England held in Cavan Town on 31 March 1635 stated that Cahell O Reily was seized in his lifetime of, inter alia, one poll of Gortnecloghy and one poll of Gowlagh. He died 1 January 1634 and his son Hugh O'Reily had reached his majority and was married.

The O'Reilly lands in Gowlagh South were confiscated in the Cromwellian Act for the Settlement of Ireland 1652 and were distributed as follows-

The 1652 Commonwealth Survey lists the proprietor as Lieutenant Arthur Newborogh and the tenant as John Trench, both of whom appear in other Templeport townlands in the same survey.

In the Hearth Money Rolls compiled on 29 September 1663 there was one person paying the Hearth Tax in Gartnecleigh- Daniel Roe Makelagher

A grant dated 3 November 1666 was made by King Charles II of England to Sir Tristram Beresford, 1st Baronet which included, inter alia, the lands of Gortnegloigh or Gorteengloigh alias Ballymagough or Ballynegough. By grant dated 11 September 1670 from King Charles II of England to said Sir Tristram Beresford, the said lands of Gortnegleigh or Ballymagough were included in the creation of a new Manor of Beresford.

A lease dated 6 April 1710 between Morley Saunders, Farrell Deane and Patrick Enery lists, inter alia, the lands of Goulagh.

A deed by Thomas Enery dated 29 Jan 1735 includes the lands of Golagh.

A deed by John Enery dated 13 December 1774 includes the lands of Golagh.

The 1790 Cavan Carvaghs list spells the name as Gollagh.

The Tithe Applotment Books for 1827 list eleven tithepayers in the townland.

The Gowlagh South Valuation Office Field books are available for October 1839.

Griffith's Valuation of 1857 lists fourteen landholders in the townland.

Brendan Smith, a Fianna Fáil politician, is a native of the townland. He has been a TD for Cavan–Monaghan since 1992. He served as the Minister for Agriculture, Fisheries and Food from 2008 to 2011.

== Census ==
Year	Population	Males	Females	Total Houses	Uninhabited
1841	96	49	47	17	0
1851	67	41	26	16	1
1861	35	16	19	10	1
1871	32	12	20	7	0
1881	42	20	22	8	0
1891	20	9	11	5	0

In the 1901 census of Ireland, there are six families listed in the townland.

In the 1911 census of Ireland, there are six families listed in the townland.
