= Bellaleenan =

Townland in the civil parish of Templeport, County Cavan, Ireland

Coordinates: 54.07514°N 7.810271°W

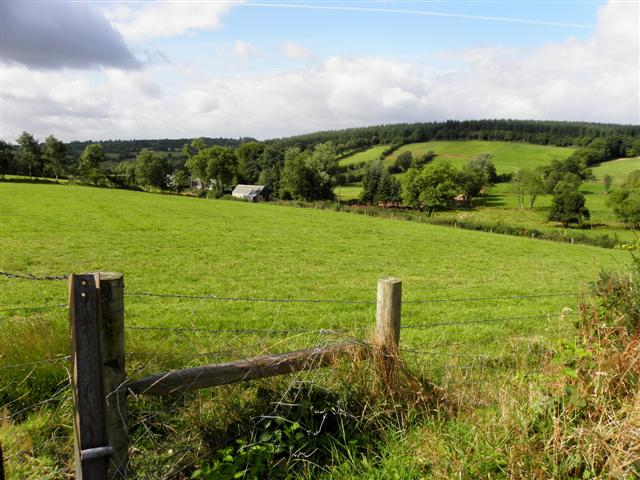
Bellaleenan Townland, Templeport, County Cavan, Ireland, looking south-west

Bellaleenan (from Irish Béal Átha an Líonáin meaning 'The Entrance to the Ford of the Gorge') is a townland in the civil parish of Templeport, County Cavan, Ireland. It lies in the Roman Catholic parish of Templeport and barony of Tullyhaw.

== Geography ==
Bellaleenan is bounded on the north by two townlands in Corlough parish, on the west by Drumlaydan townland in Corlough parish, on the south by Sraloaghan, County Leitrim and Ballymagirril townlands and on the east by Stranadarragh and Drumlougher townlands. Its chief geographical features are the River Blackwater, County Cavan, forestry plantations and dug wells. The townland covers 222 statute acres.

== History ==
In medieval times the McGovern barony of Tullyhaw was divided into economic taxation areas called ballibetoes, from the Irish Baile Biataigh (Anglicized as 'Ballybetagh'), meaning 'A Provisioner's Town or Settlement'. There were seven ballibetoes in the parish of Templeport. Bellaleenan was located in the ballybetagh of Ballymackgonghan (Irish = Baile Mac Eochagain, meaning 'McEoghan's Town').

The 1609 Baronial Map depicts the townland as part of the four polls of BMcGoagh (an abbreviation of Ballemagoechan).

In the Plantation of Ulster by grant dated 13 March 1610, King James VI and I granted four polls of Ballemagoechan to Cahell M'Owen O Reyly. The four polls consisted of 1 in Bealaghlyan, 2 in Acoylagh (modern day townland of Culliagh) and 1 in Cronarry (modern day townland of Cronery), totalling 200 acres. The said Cathal O'Reilly was the nephew of two chiefs of the O'Reilly clan- Aodh Connallach mac Maolmhordha who was chief from 1565 to 1583 and Eamonn mac Maolmhordha who was chief from 1596 to 1601. He was also a brother of Cathaoir O'Reilly who received lands in Kildoagh townland and first cousin of Donill Backagh McShane O'Reyly who was simultaneously granted lands in Burren (townland).

An Inquisition of King Charles I of England held in Cavan Town on 31 March 1635 stated that Cahell O Reily was seized in his lifetime of, inter alia, one poll of Bealaghlynan. He died 1 January 1634 and his son Hugh O'Reily had reached his majority and was married.

The O'Reilly lands in Bellaleenan were confiscated in the Cromwellian Act for the Settlement of Ireland 1652 and were distributed as follows-

In the Hearth Money Rolls compiled on 29 September 1663 there was one person paying the Hearth Tax in Ballylenan- Phelemy McKelagher

The 1652 Commonwealth Survey lists the townland (spelled Balleleanan) as belonging to Lieutenant-Colonel Tristam Beresford and a further confirming grant dated 3 November 1666 was made by King Charles II of England to the aforementioned Sir Tristram Beresford, 1st Baronet which included, inter alia, 96 acres-2 roods-32 perches of land in Gortnegloigh or Gorteengloigh alias Ballymagough or Ballynegough. By grant dated 11 September 1670 from King Charles II of England to said Sir Tristram Beresford, the said lands of Gortnegleigh or Ballymagough were included in the creation of a new Manor of Beresford.

On 10 April 1716, Marcus Beresford, 1st Earl of Tyrone the son of the aforesaid Sir Tristram Beresford, granted a lease for lives of certain lands, including Ballylenan, to James Kirkwood of Owen Gally (Owengallees). In a marriage settlement made 18 Oct 1718 with his wife Katherine (née Lowther), the said James Kirkwood settled the lands, including Ballilenam, on his children. Katherine Lowther's sister-in-law, Jane Lowther (née Beresford), was the daughter of the aforesaid Sir Tristram Beresford, which is probably how the lease came about. James Kirkwood was son of Reverend James Kirkwood, Chaplain to King William III of England, Prebendary of Kilskeery and Rector of Magheracross parishes in County Fermanagh from 1693.

The 1790 Cavan Carvaghs list spells the townland name as Bellalinan.

Lowther Kirkwood of Mullinagrave, parish of Templeport, Co. Cavan, gentleman made the following will-

2 July 1804. To his grandnephew Lowther Brien, city of Dublin, attorney, and his heirs his lands of Awengallis, Ballylenan, Ballymagirill, Stranadarragh, Carnagimlie, Cullagh, Drumleden, Leitry [Leitra], Corlagh, Lananleragh [Lannanerriagh], Gowlanlea and Drumlogher, Co. Cavan, held under lease from the Beresford family. He had begun a suit in Chancery, Ireland, against John Brien, late of Salvon, Co. Fermanagh, deceased, for setting aside a fraudulent deed obtained by said John Brien, which suit against the representatives is to be continued by said Lowther Brien, his sole exor. Witnesses: John Johnston and Andrew Rutledge, both of Ballymagiril, and Thos. Stephenson, Drumleaden, Co. Cavan, gent. Memorial witnessed by: said Andrew Rutledge, and John Balfour, city of Dublin, attorney.

The Tithe Applotment Books for 1827 list eighteen tithepayers in the townland.

The Bellaleenan Valuation Office Field books are available for October 1839.

Griffith's Valuation of 1857 lists thirteen landholders in the townland.

On 6 July 1857 the Incumbered Estates Commission published the following notice:

In the Matter of the Estate of James Brien, Geo. Brien, Edward Brien and Francis Brien, Owners. Exparte by Isabella Crummer, Petitioner. The commissioners having ordered a Sale of the Lands of Shanadaragh and Curnagunlogh, Cullegh, Drumlohgher, Drumledin, Sananaragh, and Drumledin, and Corlough, situate in the Barony of Tullyhaw, and County of Cavan, held under lease dated the 10th April, 1718, from the Bishop Raphoe, for lives renewable for ever, and which Lands are included in the denominations of Ballymagord, Owngally, Gortneglough, Drumedin or 'Ballylennin, in said lease mentioned:

== Census ==
Year	Population	Males	Females	Total Houses	Uninhabited
1841	100	50	50	19	0
1851	71	39	32	11	0
1861	82	45	37	13	0
1871	61	31	30	12	0
1881	46	23	23	11	0
1891	43	21	22	11	1

In the 1901 census of Ireland, there are ten families listed in the townland and in the 1911 census of Ireland, there are thirteen families listed in the townland.

== Antiquities ==
The only structure of historical interest in the townland seems to be Saint Patrick's Well, where a pattern was held on the first Sunday in July up to the 1950s, to mark the festival of Lughnasadh.
