= Ballymagirril =

Townland in County Cavan, Ireland

Coordinates: 54.07514°N 7.810271°W

Ballymagirril (from Irish Baile Mhig Iriail meaning 'McGirl's townland') is a townland in the civil parish of Templeport, County Cavan, Ireland. It lies in the Roman Catholic parish of Templeport and barony of Tullyhaw.

== Geography ==
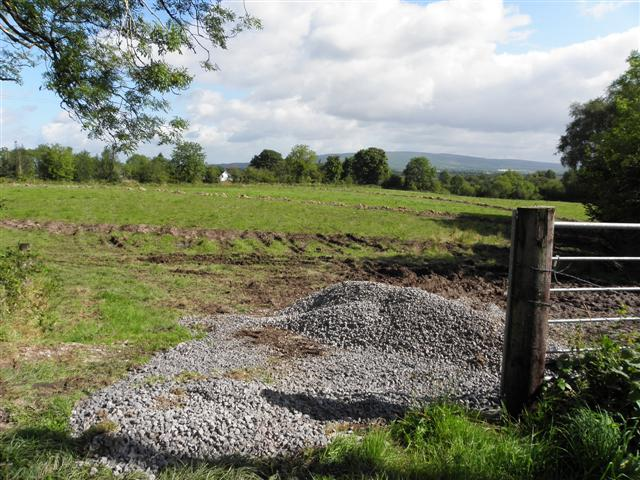
A field in the southern part of Ballymagirril townland

Ballymagirril is bounded on the north by Bellaleenan townland, on the west by Sraloaghan townland in County Leitrim, on the south by Greagh townland and on the east by Stranadarragh and Cornagunleog townlands. Its chief geographical features are the River Blackwater, County Cavan, spring wells and dug wells. Ballymagirril is traversed by minor roads and rural lanes. The townland covers 157 statute acres.

== Etymology ==
The McGirl family probably owned the townland. The name is still common in the area, e.g. John Joe McGirl.

== History ==
In medieval times the McGovern barony of Tullyhaw was divided into economic taxation areas called ballibetoes, from the Irish Baile Biataigh (Anglicized as 'Ballybetagh'), meaning 'A Provisioner's Town or Settlement'. The original purpose was to enable the farmer, who controlled the baile, to provide hospitality for those who needed it, such as poor people and travellers. The ballybetagh was further divided into townlands farmed by individual families who paid a tribute or tax to the head of the ballybetagh, who in turn paid a similar tribute to the clan chief. The steward of the ballybetagh would have been the secular equivalent of the erenagh in charge of church lands. There were seven ballibetoes in the parish of Templeport. Ballymagirril was located in the ballybetagh of Ballymagauran. The historical spellings of the ballybetagh are Ballymackgawran & Ballimacgawran (Irish = Baile Mhic Shamhráin = McGovern's Town).

Until the 19th century the modern townland of Greagh formed a sub-division of Ballymagirril.

The 1609 Baronial Map depicts the townland as B:McGirrill.

The 1652 Commonwealth Survey lists the townland as Ballemagirrell.

The 1665 Down Survey map depicts it as Ballymagurke.

William Petty's 1685 map depicts it as Ballimagurt.

In the Plantation of Ulster by grant dated 29 April 1611, along with other lands, King James VI and I granted four polls of Ballymagirrell to the McGovern Chief, Feidhlimidh Mág Samhradháin. The four polls comprised the modern day townlands of Ballymagirril, Greagh, Stranadarragh and Cornagunleog. These townlands had been part of the McGovern chief's personal demesne for several hundred years before this and it was just a Surrender and regrant confirming the existing title to the then chief. This is confirmed in a visitation by George Carew, 1st Earl of Totnes in autumn 1611 when he states that Magauran had his own land given him on this division.

An Inquisition of King Charles I of England held in Cavan town on 4 October 1626 stated that the aforesaid Phelim Magawrane died on 20 January 1622 and his lands, including 4 polls in Ballymagerrill, went to his son, the McGovern Chief Brian Magauran who was aged 30 (born 1592) and married.

The McGovern lands in Ballymagirril were confiscated in the Cromwellian Act for the Settlement of Ireland 1652 and were distributed as follows-

In the Hearth Money Rolls compiled on 29 September 1663 there was one Hearth Tax payers in Ballimagirrill- William Mungomery.

The 1652 Commonwealth Survey lists the townland as belonging to Lieutenant-Colonel Tristam Beresford and a further confirming grant dated 3 November 1666 was made by King Charles II of England to the aforementioned Sir Tristram Beresford, 1st Baronet which included, inter alia, 157 acres-3 roods-26 perches of land in Ballinagurke or Ballinegerrill or Ballinegerry. By grant dated 11 September 1670 from King Charles II of England to said Sir Tristram Beresford, the said lands of Ballynagurke or Ballyregerrill were included in the creation of a new Manor of Beresford.

On 10 April 1716, Marcus Beresford, 1st Earl of Tyrone the son of the aforesaid Sir Tristram Beresford, granted a lease for lives of certain lands, including Ballimaguerk, to James Kirkwood of Owen Gally (Owengallees). In a marriage settlement made 18 Oct 1718 with his wife Katherine (née Lowther), the said James Kirkwood settled the lands, including Bullimaguerk, on his children. Katherine Lowther's sister-in-law, Jane Lowther (née Beresford), was the daughter of the aforesaid Sir Tristram Beresford, which is probably how the lease came about. James Kirkwood was son of Reverend James Kirkwood, Chaplain to King William III of England, Prebendary of Kilskeery and Rector of Magheracross parishes in County Fermanagh from 1693.

Three Ballymagirril deeds from the 1750s are- 1. A deed dated 24 February 1757 was made between William Rutledge, John Rutledge and Robert Rutledge, all of Ballymagirrell, Co. Cavan, farmers and John Johnston of Killimority, Co. Cavan, farmer regarding lands of Ballymagirrell and Greangh. Names mentioned in the Deed were George Kirkwood, Lowther Kirkwood and Andrew Hamilton of Ballymagirrell. Witnessed by Thomas Blashford of Ballymagirrell, William Johnston, the son of John Johnston and Frances Bowen of Belturbet. 2. Articles of Agreement dated 8 Nov 1759 between William Rutledge and William Johnston, both of Ballymagirrell, Co. Cavan. 3. Lease dated 9 Nov 1759 between John Johnston of Ballymagirrell, Co. Cavan, farmer, Robert Johnston of Ballymagirell, Co. Cavan, farmer, concerning the townlands of Ballymagirrell and Grengh. Witnessed by Thomas Blashford of Ballymagirrell, Andrew Hamilton of Ballymagirrell, William Johnston and Frances Bowen of Belturbet.

In the Templeport Poll Book of 1761 there were six people registered to vote in Ballymagirril in the Irish general election, 1761 - James Elliott, John Johnston, Robert Johnston, John Rutledge, Robert Rutledge and William Rutledge. They all lived in Ballymagirril apart from James Elliott who lived in Drumlougher but had a freehold in Ballymagirril. They were entitled to two votes each. The four election candidates were Charles Coote, 1st Earl of Bellomont and Lord Newtownbutler (later Brinsley Butler, 2nd Earl of Lanesborough), both of whom were then elected Member of Parliament for Cavan County. The losing candidates were George Montgomery (MP) of Ballyconnell and Barry Maxwell, 1st Earl of Farnham. Elliott and William Rutledge both voted for Lord Newtownbutler and George Montgomery. John Johnston, Robert Johnston and John Rutledge all voted for Newtownbutler and Coote. Robert Rutledge voted for Coote and Maxwell. Absence from the poll book either meant a resident did not vote or more likely was not a freeholder entitled to vote, which would mean most of the inhabitants of Ballymagirril.

The 1790 Cavan Carvaghs list spells the name as Ballymagirrill.

In 1804 Lowther Kirkwood of Mullinagrave, parish of Templeport, Co. Cavan, gentleman made the following will-

2 July 1804. To his grandnephew Lowther Brien, city of Dublin, attorney, and his heirs his lands of Awengallis, Ballylenan, Ballymagirill, Stranadarragh, Carnagimlie, Cullagh, Drumleden, Leitry [Leitra], Corlagh, Lananleragh [Lannanerriagh], Gowlanlea and Drumlogher, Co. Cavan, held under lease from the Beresford family. He had begun a suit in Chancery, Ireland, against John Brien, late of Salvon, Co. Fermanagh, deceased, for setting aside a fraudulent deed obtained by said John Brien, which suit against the representatives is to be continued by said Lowther Brien, his sole exor. Witnesses: John Johnston and Andrew Rutledge, both of Ballymagiril, and Thos. Stephenson, Drumleaden, Co. Cavan, gent. Memorial witnessed by: said Andrew Rutledge, and John Balfour, city of Dublin, attorney.

A deed of land dated 10 April 1830 now in the Cavan Archives Service (ref P017/0036) is described as-

Assignment and conveyance made between Edward Rutledge, Ballimagirl, County Cavan, farmer, and Thomas Rutledge, his son, of the first part, and Thomas Johnston, Ballimagirl, County Cavan, farmer, of the other part. Recites that Edward Rutledge is seized of part of the lands of Ballymagirril (Ballimagirl), parish of Templeport, County Cavan, by virtue of assignment. Formerly held by his father, Robert Rutledge, deceased, and includes house, garden and outbuildings. Bounded on the east by James Rutledge's kitchen garden, on the west by a house and garden occupied by Mary Rutledge, on the north by John Rutledge's holding and on the south by the field known as Spring Well Park. In consideration of sum of £4.10.0 sterling, paid to Edward Rutledge and Thomas Rutledge by Thomas Johnston, they release to him the property including dwelling house, garden and other buildings formerly occupied by Robert Rutledge. Noted that a memorial of the deed was entered in the Register Office, city of Dublin, on 19 May 1830, in book 859, page 258, number 573258. The original deed can be viewed online.

Ambrose Leet's 1814 Directory spells the name as Ballymagirl.

In the 1825 Registry of Freeholders for County Cavan there was one freeholder registered in Ballymagirril- James Rutledge. He had no landlord as he owned the fee simple himself. His holding was valued between £20 and £49.

The Tithe Applotment Books for 1827 list ten tithepayers in the townland.

In 1833 two people in Ballymagirril were registered as a keeper of weapons- Edward Rutledge and James Rutledge. In 1836 Arthur Slack of Springford House, Ballymagirril, was registered for one pistol.

The Ballymagirril Valuation Office Field books are available for 1839-1840.

Griffith's Valuation of 1857 lists nine landholders in the townland.

On 6 July 1857 the Incumbered Estates Commission published the following notice-

In the Matter of the Estate of James Brien, Geo. Brien, Edward Brien and Francis Brien, Owners. Exparte by Isabella Crummer, Petitioner. The commissioners having ordered a Sale of the Lands of Shanadaragh and Curnagunlogh, Cullegh, Drumlohgher, Drumledin, Sananaragh, and Drumledin, and Corlough, situate in the Barony of Tullyhaw, and County of Cavan, held under lease dated the 10th April, 1718, from the Bishop Raphoe, for lives renewable for ever, and which Lands are included in the denominations of Ballymagord, Owngally, Gortneglough, Drumedin or Ballylennin, in said lease mentioned:

A distinguished native of the townland was William Rutledge who later became a politician in Victoria, Australia.

== Census ==
Year	Population	Males	Females	Total Houses	Uninhabited
1841	74	39	35	11	1
1851	45	18	27	6	0
1861	37	18	19	10	2
1871	29	14	15	5	0
1881	34	16	18	7	0
1891	49	24	25	8	0

In the 1901 census of Ireland, there are eight families listed in the townland and in the 1911 census of Ireland, there are still eight families listed in the townland.

== Antiquities ==
The only structure of historical interest in the townland seems to be stepping stones over the River Blackwater
