= Cornagunleog =

Townland in County Cavan, Ireland

Coordinates: 54.07514°N 7.810271°W

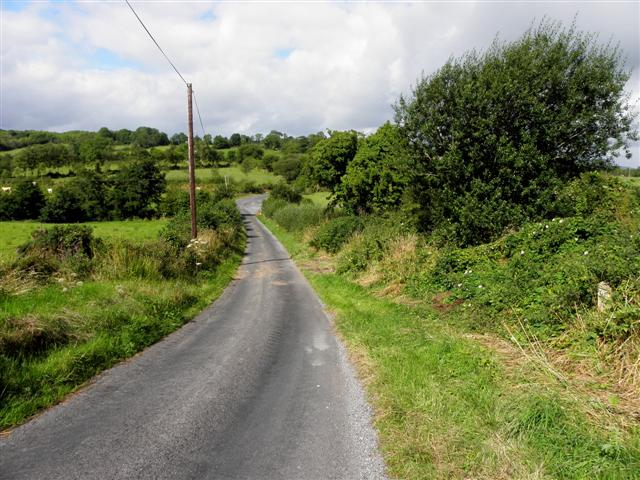
Road at Cornagunleog townland, Templeport, County Cavan, heading west.

Cornagunleog (from Irish Cor na gCoinnleóg, meaning 'The Round Hill of the Crop Stubbles') is a townland in the civil parish of Templeport, County Cavan, Ireland. It lies in the Roman Catholic parish of Templeport and barony of Tullyhaw.

== Geography ==
Cornagunleog is bounded on the north by Stranadarragh townland, on the west by Ballymagirril and Greagh townlands, on the south by Knocks and Glebe townlands in County Leitrim and on the east by Boley townland. Its chief geographical features are a stream, a wood and dug wells. Cornagunleog is traversed by the L1037 road, minor roads and rural lanes. The townland covers 183 statute acres.

== History ==
In medieval times the McGovern barony of Tullyhaw was divided into economic taxation areas called ballibetoes, from the Irish Baile Biataigh (Anglicized as 'Ballybetagh'), meaning 'A Provisioner's Town or Settlement'. The original purpose was to enable the farmer, who controlled the baile, to provide hospitality for those who needed it, such as poor people and travellers. The ballybetagh was further divided into townlands farmed by individual families who paid a tribute or tax to the head of the ballybetagh, who in turn paid a similar tribute to the clan chief. The steward of the ballybetagh would have been the secular equivalent of the erenagh in charge of church lands. There were seven ballibetoes in the parish of Templeport. Cornagunleog was located in the ballybetagh of Ballymagauran. The historical spellings of the ballybetagh are Ballymackgawran & Ballimacgawran (Irish = Baile Mhic Shamhráin = McGovern's Town).

Until the late 18th century Cornagunleog formed part of the modern townland of Stranadarragh so its history is the same until then.

The 1790 Cavan Carvaghs list spells the townland name as Curnegunlieg.

Lowther Kirkwood of Mullinagrave, parish of Templeport, Co. Cavan, gentleman made the following will:

2 July 1804. To his grandnephew Lowther Brien, city of Dublin, attorney, and his heirs his lands of Awengallis, Ballylenan, Ballymagirill, Stranadarragh, Carnagimlie, Cullagh, Drumleden, Leitry [Leitra], Corlagh, Lananleragh [Lannanerriagh], Gowlanlea and Drumlogher, Co. Cavan, held under lease from the Beresford family. He had begun a suit in Chancery, Ireland, against John Brien, late of Salvon, Co. Fermanagh, deceased, for setting aside a fraudulent deed obtained by said John Brien, which suit against the representatives is to be continued by said Lowther Brien, his sole exor. Witnesses: John Johnston and Andrew Rutledge, both of Ballymagiril, and Thos. Stephenson, Drumleaden, Co. Cavan, gent. Memorial witnessed by: said Andrew Rutledge, and John Balfour, city of Dublin, attorney.

The Tithe Applotment Books for 1827 list sixteen tithepayers in the townland.

In 1833 one person in Cornagunleog was registered as a keeper of weapons- John Dolan.

The Cornagunleog Valuation Office Field books are available for October 1839.

In 1841 the population of the townland was 97, being 49 males and 48 females. There were sixteen houses in the townland, one of which was uninhabited.

In 1851 the population of the townland was 56, being 31 males and 25 females, the reduction being due to the Great Famine (Ireland). There were eleven houses in the townland, one of which was uninhabited.

Griffith's Valuation of 1857 lists twelve landholders in the townland.

On 6 July 1857 the Incumbered Estates Commission published the following notice-

In the Matter of the Estate of James Brien, Geo. Brien, Edward Brien and Francis Brien, Owners. Exparte by Isabella Crummer, Petitioner. The commissioners having ordered a Sale of the Lands of Shanadaragh and Curnagunlogh, Cullegh, Drumlohgher, Drumledin, Sananaragh, and Drumledin, and Corlough, situate in the Barony of Tullyhaw, and County of Cavan, held under lease dated 10 April 1718, from the Bishop Raphoe, for lives renewable for ever, and which Lands are included in the denominations of Ballymagord, Owngally, Gortneglough, Drumedin or Ballylennin, in said lease mentioned:

In 1861 the population of the townland was 58, being 29 males and 29 females. There were ten houses in the townland and all were inhabited.

In 1871 the population of the townland was 55, being 32 males and 23 females. There were ten houses in the townland, all were inhabited.

In 1881 the population of the townland was 66, being 32 males and 34 females. There were eleven houses in the townland, all were inhabited.

In 1891 the population of the townland was 57, being 28 males and 29 females. There were eleven houses in the townland, all were inhabited.

In the 1901 census of Ireland, there are twelve families listed in the townland, and in the 1911 census of Ireland, there are only eleven families listed in the townland.

== Antiquities ==
The chief structures of historical interest in the townland are

1. An earthen ring-fort The fort is a substantial size because it sits on the Cavan-Leitrim border and on the old southern border of the McGovern Clan lands, so it would have been a fortified outpost in medieval times.
2. An earthen ring-fort
3. A footbridge over the stream
