= Stranadarragh =

Townland in the civil parish of Templeport, County Cavan, Ireland

Coordinates: 54.07514°N 7.810271°W

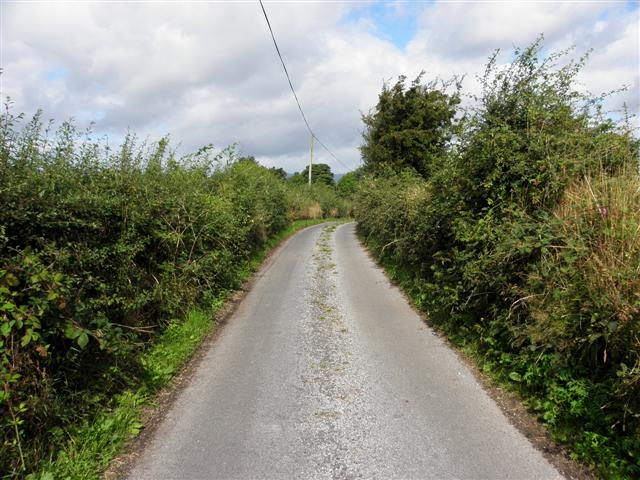
Road at Stranadarragh townland, Templeport, County Cavan, Ireland, heading north-west.

Stranadarragh (from Irish Srath na Darach, meaning 'The River-Meadow of the Oaktree') is a townland in the civil parish of Templeport, County Cavan, Ireland. It lies in the Roman Catholic parish of Templeport and barony of Tullyhaw.

== Geography ==
Stranadarragh is bounded on the north by Drumlougher townland, on the west by Bellaleenan and Ballymagirril townlands, on the south by Cornagunleog and Boley townlands and on the east by Owengallees townland. Its chief geographical features are the River Blackwater, County Cavan, marshes and dug wells. Stranadarragh is traversed by minor roads and rural lanes. The townland covers 155 statute acres.

== History ==
In medieval times the McGovern barony of Tullyhaw was divided into economic taxation areas called ballibetoes, from the Irish Baile Biataigh (Anglicized as 'Ballybetagh'), meaning 'A Provisioner's Town or Settlement'. The original purpose was to enable the farmer, who controlled the baile, to provide hospitality for those who needed it, such as poor people and travellers. The ballybetagh was further divided into townlands farmed by individual families who paid a tribute or tax to the head of the ballybetagh, who in turn paid a similar tribute to the clan chief. The steward of the ballybetagh would have been the secular equivalent of the erenagh in charge of church lands. There were seven ballibetoes in the parish of Templeport. Stranadarragh was located in the ballybetagh of Ballymagauran. The historical spellings of the ballybetagh are Ballymackgawran & Ballimacgawran (Irish = Baile Mhic Shamhráin = McGovern's Town).

Until the late 18th century, the modern townland of Cornagunleog formed part of Stranadarragh.

In the Plantation of Ulster by grant dated 29 April 1611, along with other lands, King James VI and I granted four polls of Ballymagirrell to the McGovern Chief, Feidhlimidh Mág Samhradháin. The four polls conmprised the modern day townlands of Ballymagirril, Greagh, Stranadarragh and Cornagunleog. These townlands had been part of the McGovern chief's personal demesne for several hundred years before this and it was just a Surrender and regrant confirming the existing title to the then chief. This is confirmed in a visitation by George Carew, 1st Earl of Totnes in autumn 1611 when he states that Magauran had his own land given him on this division.

An Inquisition of King Charles I of England held in Cavan town on 4 October 1626 stated that the aforesaid Phelim Magawrane died on 20 January 1622 and his lands, including 4 polls in Ballymagerrill, went to his son, the McGovern Chief Brian Magauran who was aged 30 (born 1592) and married.

The McGovern lands in Stranadarragh were confiscated in the Cromwellian Act for the Settlement of Ireland 1652 and were distributed as follows-

The 1652 Commonwealth Survey spells the name as Srahnedaragh. The 1665 Down Survey map depicts it as Shanderagh. William Petty's 1685 map depicts it as Shanderagh.

The 1652 Commonwealth Survey lists the proprietor as Lieutenant-Colonel Tristram Beresford, who also appears as proprietor of other townlands in the survey. In the Hearth Money Rolls of 1662 there were no taxpayers paying the Hearth Tax in Stranadarragh.

A grant dated 3 November 1666 was made by King Charles II of England to Sir Tristram Beresford, 1st Baronet which included, inter alia, the lands of Shranadanagh. By grant dated 11 September 1670 from King Charles II of England to said Sir Tristram Beresford, the said lands of Shranadanagh were included in the creation of a new Manor of Beresford.

The 1790 Cavan Carvaghs list spells the townland name as Sranedaragh.

Lowther Kirkwood of Mullinagrave, parish of Templeport, Co. Cavan, gentleman made the following will:

2 July 1804. To his grandnephew Lowther Brien, city of Dublin, attorney, and his heirs his lands of Awengallis, Ballylenan, Ballymagirill, Stranadarragh, Carnagimlie, Cullagh, Drumleden, Leitry [Leitra], Corlagh, Lananleragh [Lannanerriagh], Gowlanlea and Drumlogher, Co. Cavan, held under lease from the Beresford family. He had begun a suit in Chancery, Ireland, against John Brien, late of Salvon, Co. Fermanagh, deceased, for setting aside a fraudulent deed obtained by said John Brien, which suit against the representatives is to be continued by said Lowther Brien, his sole exor. Witnesses: John Johnston and Andrew Rutledge, both of Ballymagiril, and Thos. Stephenson, Drumleaden, Co. Cavan, gent. Memorial witnessed by: said Andrew Rutledge, and John Balfour, city of Dublin, attorney.

The Tithe Applotment Books for 1827 list eleven tithepayers in the townland.

The Stranadarragh Valuation Office Field books are available for October 1839.

Griffith's Valuation of 1857 lists seventeen landholders in the townland.

On 6 July 1857 the Incumbered Estates Commission published the following notice:

In the Matter of the Estate of James Brien, Geo. Brien, Edward Brien and Francis Brien, Owners. Exparte by Isabella Crummer, Petitioner. The commissioners having ordered a Sale of the Lands of Shanadaragh and Curnagunlogh, Cullegh, Drumlohgher, Drumledin, Sananaragh, and Drumledin, and Corlough, situate in the Barony of Tullyhaw, and County of Cavan, held under lease dated the 10th April, 1718, from the Bishop Raphoe, for lives renewable for ever, and which Lands are included in the denominations of Ballymagord, Owngally, Gortneglough, Drumedin or Ballylennin, in said lease mentioned:

== Census ==
| Year | Population | Males | Females | Total Houses | Uninhabited |
|---|---|---|---|---|---|
| 1841 | 77 | 45 | 32 | 11 | 0 |
| 1851 | 58 | 28 | 30 | 10 | 0 |
| 1861 | 70 | 35 | 35 | 12 | 0 |
| 1871 | 45 | 21 | 24 | 9 | 0 |
| 1881 | 36 | 18 | 18 | 8 | 0 |
| 1891 | 40 | 20 | 20 | 8 | 0 |

In the 1901 census of Ireland, there are ten families listed in the townland, and in the 1911 census of Ireland, there are only eight families listed in the townland.

== Antiquities ==
1. An earthen ringfort
2. An earthen ringfort
3. Stepping stones over the River Blackwater
