= Mullaghmore, Templeport =

Townland in the civil parish of Templeport, County Cavan, Ireland

Coordinates: 54.07514°N 7.810271°W

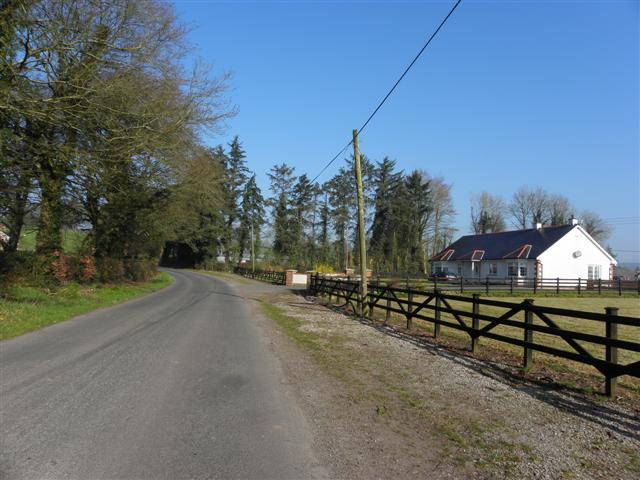
Road at Mullaghmore townland, Templeport, County Cavan, Ireland, heading north-west to Kilsob.

Mullaghmore (from Irish Mullach Mór meaning 'Great Summit') is a townland in the civil parish of Templeport, County Cavan, Ireland. It lies in the Roman Catholic parish of Templeport and barony of Tullyhaw.

== Geography ==
Mullaghmore is bounded on the north by Lakefield, Templeport townland, on the west by Owengallees and Gowlagh South townlands, on the south by Cloncurkney townland and on the east by Kildoagh and Kilsob townlands. Its chief geographical features are Bellaboy Lough (Irish = Loch Béal Átha Buí = The Lake of the Entrance to the Yellow Ford), Lakefield Lough, a stream, a wood and spring wells. Mullaghmore is traversed by the L1037 road, minor roads and rural lanes. The townland covers 205 statute acres.

== History ==
In medieval times the McGovern barony of Tullyhaw was divided into economic taxation areas called ballibetoes, from the Irish Baile Biataigh (Anglicized as 'Ballybetagh'), meaning 'A Provisioner's Town or Settlement'. The original purpose was to enable the farmer, who controlled the baile, to provide hospitality for those who needed it, such as poor people and travellers. The ballybetagh was further divided into townlands farmed by individual families who paid a tribute or tax to the head of the ballybetagh, who in turn paid a similar tribute to the clan chief. The steward of the ballybetagh would have been the secular equivalent of the erenagh in charge of church lands. There were seven ballibetoes in the parish of Templeport. Mullaghmore was located in the ballybetagh of Bally Gortnekargie (Irish "Gort na Carraige", meaning 'The Field of the Rock').

Up until the late 18th century Mullaghmore was included in the modern townland of Cloncurkney as a subdivision, so its history is the same until then. The strip of land separating Bellaboy Lough from Lakefield Lough was known as Rus or Roscoo (from Irish either Ros Cunga meaning 'The Wood of the Narrow Strip of Land' or Ros Cú meaning 'The Wood of the Hound').

In the Hearth Money Rolls of 1662 there were no people paying the Hearth Tax in Mullaghmore.

The Reverend Veaitch Betty of Lakefield, Templeport by his will dated 16 July 1783 (Born 1709. Died August 1785. Probate granted July 1796) stated- To be buried in the vault I made at Temple Piert. To my dear wife Mary Betty the houses and demesne of Lakefield with the mill race and ten acres whereon the mill is built provided she keeps unmarried, and after her demise to my eldest son Rowland Betty. To my daughters, Susanna Betty and Ann Betty, £300 each to be paid out of the lands of Kilsob. To my second son William Betty the farm of land known as Middle Kilsob or Gortenane, and his heirs. To my eldest son Rowland Betty the lands of Newtown known by the name of Tony McCallan, the farm of Lower Kilsob and the farm of Mullaghmore, the above lands not to be taken over until my debts and the children's fortunes are paid. Should either son die without male heirs then to the elder surviving daughter of either. To my said son William Beatty the lease of Gortnacarrig, County Cavan, made to me by the Right Honourable Lord Farnham and the lease of Lavaghmore, Co. Leitrim, made to me by Samuel Campbell, Esq. To my granddaughter Isabella Simpson twenty pounds to be paid by her uncle William Betty when she marries or comes of age. Ten shillings each to the poorest widows or orphans of Templepiert and Drumreilly. A debt of nearly £100 is owed to me by Rev. Mr. Swanne.

Executors to be my wife Mary Betty and my sons Rowland and William. Witnesses: Thomas Farrelly, Hugh Bannan and John Logan.

Codicil dated 27 September 1784. The bequest to my wife also includes the peninsula of Rus and Francis McTaggart’s houses to enable her to support my daughters to whom I bequeath an additional £200 each. To my son William that part of Mullaghmore formerly in the possession of Andrew Brady and now in possession of Farrell Logan, the farm near Bawnboybridge now in the possession of Arthur and William Ennis, those parts of Gortnacarrigg and Lavagh Middle and Kilsob now in the possession of the Gilronans and Michael Ward, Thomas Farrelly and Flin and that part called Ruserk in the possession of Laurence Bannan (subject to a rent of Col. Wynne), and his heirs, and in default to said Rowland Betty and his heirs male, etc. and in default to my own right heirs. Witnesses: Thomas Farrelly, Hugh Bannan, Michael Logan. Memorial witnessed by: John Farrelly and Hugh Bannan 503, 380, 324301 William Betty (seal) sworn at Cavan 12 July 1796

The 1790 Cavan Carvaghs list spells the name as Mullaghmore.

The Tithe Applotment Books for 1827 list six tithepayers in the townland.

The Mullaghmore Valuation Office Field books are available for October 1839.

Griffith's Valuation of 1857 lists twenty four landholders in the townland.

== Census ==
Year	Population	Males	Females	Total Houses	Uninhabited
1841	51	24	27	9	0
1851	36	17	19	7	0
1861	23	11	12	6	0
1871	18	8	10	8	1
1881	17	8	9	3	0
1891	16	8	8	3	0

In the 1901 census of Ireland, there are four families listed in the townland, and in the 1911 census of Ireland, there are only three families listed in the townland.

== Antiquities ==
The chief structures of historical interest in the townland are-

1. Roscoo Bridge
2. A decorated flat bronze axehead found on rocky ground while filling in a quarry
