= The Oxburgh Chalice =

Irish silver chalice of 1665

The Oxburgh Chalice is preserved by the church authorities in the parish of Templeport in County Cavan, Ireland. It bears the date 1665 and is inscribed in Latin with the following inscription (in translation): Pray for the soul of Heward Oxburgh and Clare Oxburgh alias Coghlan who had this made in 1665.

== History ==
Heward Oxburgh was High Sheriff of Offaly (Kings County) and represented the county in the Patriot Parliament summoned by King James II in 1689. The Oxburghs were strong supporters of James II and several officers of the family fought at Derry, Aughrim and the Boyne. Colonel Heward Oxburgh was killed at the Battle of Aughrim on 12 July 1691. After the Williamite War the Oxburgh estates were confiscated. Clare Oxburgh made a claim on her late husband’s property and this helps to establish the donors of the chalice. She belonged to the Coghlan family who also had estates in Offaly and whose lands were confiscated by William of Orange.

A synod of the Irish church was held in the townland of Owengallees, Baunbuidhe (Bawnboy) in the parish of Templeport at Pentecost 1669, four years after the Oxburgh Chalice was made. Tradition says that the chalice had been in the possession of a friar named O’Coghlan who attended the synod as a representative of a northern Franciscan friary and that this is how the chalice came to Bawnboy.

The base of the chalice shows Christ crucified, with a ladder on either side of the cross. There are figures of two animals and a bird that resembles a pelican with its young on its back, being fed with the mother’s flesh and blood, a symbol for the Eucharist.

The chalice is only used on rare occasions.

== Sources ==
- Templeport: Rev. Daniel Gallogly (1979)
