= Greagh =

Townland in County Cavan, Ireland

Coordinates: 54.0866°N 7.7307°W

Greagh (from Irish Gréach meaning 'a Moor or flat bog') is a townland in the civil parish of Templeport, County Cavan, Ireland. It lies in the Roman Catholic parish of Templeport and the barony of Tullyhaw.

== Geography ==
Greagh is bounded on the north by Ballymagirril townland, on the west by Sraloaghan and Leckan townlands in County Leitrim, on the south by Lislahy and Knocks townlands in County Leitrim, and on the east by Cornagunleog townland. Its chief geographical features are wood and spring wells. Greagh is traversed by minor roads and rural lanes. The townland covers 142 statute acres.

== History ==
In medieval times the McGovern barony of Tullyhaw was divided into economic taxation areas called ballibetoes, from the Irish Baile Biataigh (Anglicized as 'Ballybetagh'), meaning 'A Provisioner's Town or Settlement'. The original purpose was to enable the farmer, who controlled the baile, to provide hospitality for those who needed it, such as poor people and travellers. The ballybetagh was further divided into townlands farmed by individual families who paid a tribute or tax to the head of the ballybetagh, who in turn paid a similar tribute to the clan chief. The steward of the ballybetagh would have been the secular equivalent of the erenagh in charge of church lands. There were seven ballibetoes in the parish of Templeport. Greagh was located in the ballybetagh of Ballymagauran. The historical spellings of the ballybetagh are Ballymackgawran & Ballimacgawran (Irish = Baile Mhic Shamhráin = McGovern's Town).

Until the 19th century Greagh formed part of the modern townland of Ballymagirril, so its history is the same until then.

The Greagh Valuation Office Field books are available for October 1839.

In 1841 the population of the townland was 59, being 29 males and 30 females. There were eleven houses in the townland, and all were inhabited.

In 1851 the population of the townland was 25, being 9 males and 16 females, the reduction being due to the Great Famine (Ireland). There were six houses in the townland and all were inhabited.

Griffith's Valuation of 1857 lists six landholders in the townland.

In 1861 the population of the townland was 26, being 13 males and 13 females. There were four houses in the townland, of which two were uninhabited.

In 1871 the population of the townland was 13, being 7 males and 6 females. There were three houses in the townland, and all were inhabited.

In 1881 the population of the townland was 16, being 8 males and 8 females. There were four houses in the townland, of which one was uninhabited.

In 1891 the population of the townland was 22, being 8 males and 14 females. There were four houses in the townland, all were inhabited.

In the 1901 census of Ireland, there are four families listed in the townland, and in the 1911 census of Ireland, there are only three families listed in the townland.

== Antiquities ==
There don't seem to be any structures of historical interest in the townland.
