= Corboy Glebe =

Townland in County Cavan, Ireland

Corboy Glebe (from Irish Corr Buí meaning 'The Yellow Hill (of the Glebe)') is a townland in the civil parish of Templeport, County Cavan, Ireland. It lies in the Roman Catholic parish of Templeport and barony of Tullyhaw.

== Geography ==
Corboy Glebe is bounded on the north by Kildoagh townland, on the west by Cloncurkney townland, on the south by Gortaclogher townland and on the east by Port, Templeport townland. Its chief geographical features are Bellaboy Lough (Irish = Loch Béal Átha Buí = The Lake of the Entrance to the Yellow Ford), Templeport Lough, a wood, streams and a sandpit. There are also three exceptional specimen trees in the townland - a Sycamore (Acer pseudoplatanus); a Beech (Fagus Sylvatica); and a Lime (Tilia × europaea). Corboy Glebe is traversed by minor public roads and rural lanes. The townland covers 145 statute acres.

== History ==
The 1609 Baronial Map depicts the townland as Corboy.

The 1652 Commonwealth Survey spells the name as Corboy.

The 1665 Down Survey map depicts it as Cockboy.

William Petty's 1685 map depicts it as Corkboy.

Corboy Glebe formed part of the termon or hospital lands belonging to Templeport Church and so its history belongs to the ecclesiastical history of the parish. It would have belonged to the parish priest and the erenach family rather than the McGovern chief. In the 16th century these ecclesiastical lands in Templeport were seized in the course of the Reformation in Ireland and kept first by the English monarch and then eventually granted to the Anglican Bishop of Kilmore.

An Inquisition held in Cavan Town on 20 June 1588 valued the total vicarage of Templeport at £10.

An Inquisition held in Cavan Town on 19 September 1590 found the termon or hospital lands of Templeport to consist of four polls of land at a yearly value of 4 shillings. Corboy Glebe was one of these four polls.

By grant dated 6 March 1605, along with other lands, King James VI and I granted a lease of the farm, termons or hospitals of Tampleporte containing 4 pulls for 21 years at an annual rent of 10 shillings to Sir Garret Moore, 1st Viscount Moore. Corboy Glebe was one of these four pulls.

By grant dated 10 August 1607, along with other lands, King James VI and I granted a further lease of the farms, termons or hospitals of Templeport containing 2 pulls for 21 years at an annual rent of 13 shillings to the aforesaid Sir Garret Moore, 1st Viscount Moore of Mellifont Abbey, County Louth. This grant covered the two extra polls of ecclesiastical land in the parish which had been overlooked in the previous inquisitions and grants.

A survey held by Sir John Davies (poet) at Cavan Town on 6 September 1608 stated that- the ecclesiastical lands of Templeporte were containing 6 pulls lying near the parish church and that the rectory was appropriated to the Abbey of Kells, County Meath. Corboy Glebe was one of these six pulls.

An Inquisition held in Cavan Town on 25 September 1609 found the termon land of Templeport to consist of six polls of land, out of which the Bishop of Kilmore was entitled to a rent of 10 shillings and 2/3rd of a beef per annum. Corboy Glebe was one of these six polls. The Inquisition then granted the lands to the Protestant Bishop of Kilmore.

By a deed dated 6 April 1612, Robert Draper, the Anglican Bishop of Kilmore and Ardagh granted a joint lease of 60 years over the termons or herenachs of, inter alia, 6 polls in Templepurt to Oliver Lambart, 1st Lord Lambart, Baron of Cavan, of Kilbeggan, County Westmeath and Sir Garret Moore, 1st Viscount Moore, of Mellifont Abbey, County Louth. Corboy Glebe formed part of the six polls in this lease.

By deed dated 17 July 1639, William Bedell, the Anglican Bishop of Kilmore, extended the above lease of Templepart to Oliver Lambert’s son, Charles Lambart, 1st Earl of Cavan.

The 1652 Commonwealth Survey lists the proprietor of Corboy as The Lord of Cavan (i.e. Charles Lambart, 1st Earl of Cavan).

In the Hearth Money Rolls compiled on 29 September 1663 there was one Hearth Tax payer in Corby- Thomas Magochan.

In the Templeport Poll Book of 1761 there was one person registered to vote in Corboy Glebe in the 1761 Irish general election - Reverend Peter Lombard junior, the Church of Ireland Rector of Templeport. He actually lived in Clooncorrick Castle, Carrigallen, County Leitrim but had a freehold in Corboy Glebe. He was entitled to cast two votes. The four election candidates were Charles Coote, 1st Earl of Bellomont and Lord Newtownbutler (later Brinsley Butler, 2nd Earl of Lanesborough), both of whom were then elected Member of Parliament for Cavan County. The losing candidates were George Montgomery (MP) of Ballyconnell and Barry Maxwell, 1st Earl of Farnham. Lombard voted for Maxwell and Montgomery. Absence from the poll book either meant a resident did not vote or more likely was not a freeholder entitled to vote, which would mean most of the inhabitants of Corboy Glebe.

The 1790 Cavan Carvaghs list spells the name as Corrobey.

The Tithe Applotment Books for 1827 list seven tithepayers in the townland.

The 1836 Ordnance Survey Namebooks state- Corboy contains 144 acres, of which 61 are cultivated, 21 of flooded, 6 of wood and 46 of water. This townland belongs to the glebe and is held by the rector of the parish... The townland is bounded on the north and east sides by two large lakes. On the west bank of the latter lake is situated the residence of Rector Beresford.

The Corboy Glebe Valuation Office Field books are available for 1839-1840.

Griffith's Valuation of 1857 lists eight landholders in the townland.

== Census ==
Year	Population	Males	Females	Total Houses	Uninhabited
1841	28	10	18	4	0
1851	20	9	11	3	0
1861	16	5	11	4	1
1871	28	11	17	4	0
1881	19	4	15	3	0
1891	11	3	8	3	0

In the 1901 census of Ireland, there are six families listed in the townland.

In the 1911 census of Ireland, there are only four families listed in the townland.

== Church of Ireland clergy ==
The list of Anglican rectors who owned the Glebe House in Corboy Glebe is viewable online.

== Antiquities ==
The chief structures of historical interest in the townland are-

1. Corboy Glebe House
2. Two foot bridges over the streams
3. a Lime kiln
