= Drumlougher =

Townland in the civil parish of Templeport, County Cavan, Ireland

Coordinates: 54.07514°N 7.810271°W

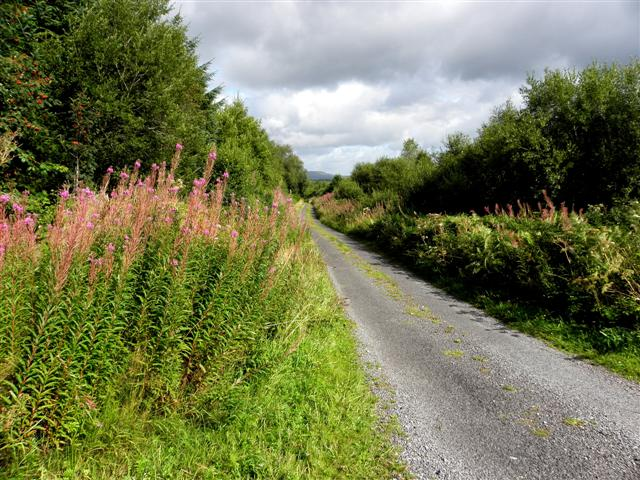
Road at Drumlougher townland, Templeport, County Cavan, Ireland, heading WNW

Drumlougher (from Irish Druim luachra, meaning 'Ridge of the Rushes') is a townland in the civil parish of Templeport, County Cavan, Ireland. It lies in the Roman Catholic parish of Templeport and barony of Tullyhaw.

== Geography ==
Drumlougher is bounded on the north by Gortnacargy and Teeboy townlands in Corlough parish, on the west by Culliagh townland in Corlough parish and Bellaleenan townland, on the south by Stranadarragh townland and on the east by Owengallees townland. Its chief geographical features are Bunerky Lough (Irish = Loch Bun Adhairc = The Lake of the Butt of the Horn), the River Blackwater, County Cavan and a forestry plantation. Drumlougher is traversed by minor roads and rural lanes. The townland covers 339 statute acres.

== History ==
Up until the Cromwellian Act for the Settlement of Ireland 1652 Drumlougher formed part of Owengallees townland and its history until then is the same.

A grant dated 3 November 1666 from King Charles II of England to Sir Tristram Beresford, 1st Baronet included, inter alia, lands of Drumlogh. By grant dated 11 September 1670 from King Charles II of England to said Sir Tristram Beresford, the lands of Drumlogh were included in the creation of a new Manor of Beresford.

In the Templeport Poll Book of 1761 there was one person registered to vote in Drumlowrough in the 1761 Irish general election - James Elliott who lived in Drumlougher and also had a freehold in Ballymagirril. He was entitled to two votes. The four election candidates were Charles Coote, 1st Earl of Bellomont and Lord Newtownbutler (later Brinsley Butler, 2nd Earl of Lanesborough), both of whom were then elected Member of Parliament for Cavan County. The losing candidates were George Montgomery (MP) of Ballyconnell and Barry Maxwell, 1st Earl of Farnham. Elliott voted for Newtownbutler and Montgomery. Absence from the poll book either meant a resident did not vote or more likely was not a freeholder entitled to vote, which would mean most of the inhabitants of Drumlougher.

In 1804 Lowther Kirkwood of Mullinagrave, parish of Templeport, Co. Cavan, gentleman made the following will-

2 July 1804. To his grandnephew Lowther Brien, city of Dublin, attorney, and his heirs his lands of Awengallis, Ballylenan, Ballymagirill, Stranadarragh, Carnagimlie, Cullagh, Drumleden, Leitry [Leitra], Corlagh, Lananleragh [Lannanerriagh], Gowlanlea and Drumlogher, Co. Cavan, held under lease from the Beresford family. He had begun a suit in Chancery, Ireland, against John Brien, late of Salvon, Co. Fermanagh, deceased, for setting aside a fradulent [sic] deed obtained by said John Brien, which suit against the representatives is to be continued by said Lowther Brien, his sole exor. Witnesses: John Johnston and Andrew Rutledge, both of Ballymagiril, and Thos. Stephenson, Drumleaden, Co. Cavan, gent. Memorial witnessed by: said Andrew Rutledge, and John Balfour, city of Dublin, attorney.

In the 1825 Registry of Freeholders for County Cavan there were six freeholders registered in Drumlougher- Thomas Baxter, Phill Baxter, Michael Dolan, John Magee, James Plunkett and Luke Reilly. They were all Forty-shilling freeholders holding a lease for lives from their landlord. Luke Reilly's landlord was James Lawder and the rest held their land from Henry Breen.

The Tithe Applotment Books for 1827 list eighteen tithepayers in the townland.

In 1833 one person in Drumlougher was registered as a keeper of weapons- Hugh Harne. In 1836 James Dolan of Drumlogher, was registered for one gun.

The Drumlougher Valuation Office Field books are available for 1839–1840.

Griffith's Valuation of 1857 lists thirty seven landholders in the townland.

On 6 July 1857 the Incumbered Estates Commission published the following notice-

In the Matter of the Estate of James Brien, Geo. Brien, Edward Brien and Francis Brien, Owners. Exparte by Isabella Crummer, Petitioner. The commissioners having ordered a Sale of the Lands of Shanadaragh and Curnagunlogh, Cullegh, Drumlohgher, Drumledin, Sananaragh, and Drumledin, and Corlough, situate in the Barony of Tullyhaw, and County of Cavan, held under lease dated the 10th April, 1718, from the Bishop Raphoe, for lives renewable for ever, and which Lands are included in the denominations of Ballymagord, Owngally, Gortneglough, Drumedin or Ballylennin, in said lease mentioned:

== Drumlougher National School ==
The book Bawnboy and Templeport History Heritage Folklore by Chris Maguire gives the following description of the school-

DRUMLOUGHER N.S. Built 1842. Principal Teachers of Drumlougher N.S.- Thomas Edwards (1843-'49); Michael Edwards ( 1849- ); Miss Agnes Culhane (Mrs. Patrick Maguire and later Mrs. Ml. Fallon) 1920s-1950s; Mrs. Margaret Dolan (1957-'60); Margaret Gillerlane (1960-'68). Assistants:- Margaret Edwards (1847-'54); Catherine Edwards (1854- ); Marian Collins(1953-‘64).

The Reports from the Commissioners of National Education in Ireland give the following figures for Drumlougher School, Roll No. 3429-

1846: One male teacher who received an annual salary of £12. There were 150 pupils, 96 boys and 54 girls.

1854: One female teacher and one female workmistress who between them received an annual salary of £27-10s. There were 120 pupils, 70 boys and 50 girls.

1862: Michael Edwards was the headmaster and Eleanor Edwards was the workmistress, both Roman Catholics. There were 114 pupils, all Roman Catholic apart from 1 who was Church of Ireland. The Catechism was taught to the Catholic pupils on weekdays from 3pm to 3:10 pm and on Saturdays from 10am to 12 noon. There is a long list of nineteen locals who helped with the Catechism teaching.

1874: One male teacher and one female workmistress who between them received an annual salary of £40. There were 102 pupils, 51 boys and 51 girls.

1890: There were 94 pupils.

== Census ==
Year	Population	Males	Females	Total Houses	Uninhabited
1841	121	52	69	19	0
1851	88	40	48	17	2
1861	79	40	39	17	2
1871	57	27	30	12	1
1881	55	26	29	11	1
1891	54	29	25	11	0

In the 1901 census of Ireland, there are fourteen families listed in the townland and in the 1911 census of Ireland, there are fifteen families listed in the townland.

== Antiquities ==
There seem to be no structures of historical interest in the townland apart from the site of the school and a Mass Rock used in the Penal Times of the 18th century.
