= Kildoagh =

Townland in County Cavan, Ireland

- Townland
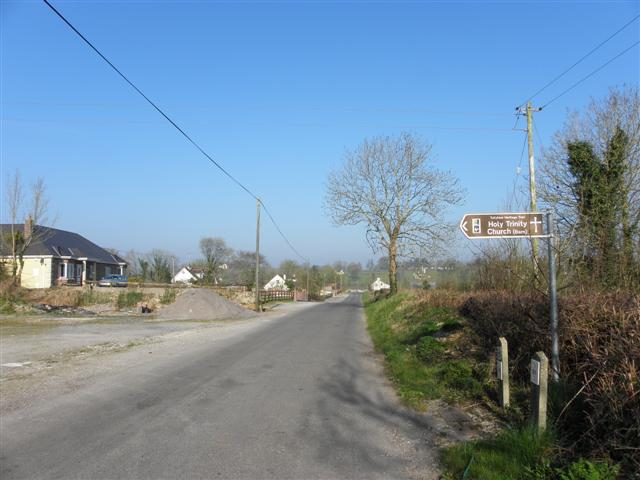
- Road at Kildoagh townland, Templeport parish, County Cavan, Ireland, heading north-west.
- Etymology: from Irish either Coill Dumha meaning 'Wood of the Tumulus' or Coill Dobhcha meaning "Wood of the Vat or Tun"
- Location in Ireland
- Coordinates: 54°6′17″N 7°40′34″W
- Country: Ireland
- County: Cavan
- Civil parish: Templeport

Area
  - Total: 0.7226 km^{2} (0.2790 sq mi)

Kildoagh (from Irish either Coill Dumha meaning 'Wood of the Tumulus' or Coill Dobhcha meaning "Wood of the Vat or Tun") is a townland in the civil parish of Templeport, County Cavan, Ireland. It lies in the Roman Catholic parish of Templeport and barony of Tullyhaw.

== Geography ==
Kildoagh is bounded on the north by Kilsob and Muinaghan townlands, on the west by Mullaghmore, Templeport townland, on the south by Corboy Glebe townland and on the east by Port, Templeport townland. Its chief geographical features are Bellaboy Lough (Irish = Loch Béal Átha Buí = The Lake of the Entrance to the Yellow Ford), Templeport Lough, streams, spring wells and dug wells. Kildoagh is traversed by minor roads and rural lanes. The townland covers 179 statute acres.

== History ==
In medieval times the McGovern barony of Tullyhaw was divided into economic taxation areas called ballibetoes, from the Irish Baile Biataigh (Anglicized as 'Ballybetagh'), meaning 'A Provisioner's Town or Settlement'. The original purpose was to enable the farmer, who controlled the baile, to provide hospitality for those who needed it, such as poor people and travellers. The ballybetagh was further divided into townlands farmed by individual families who paid a tribute or tax to the head of the ballybetagh, who in turn paid a similar tribute to the clan chief. The steward of the ballybetagh would have been the secular equivalent of the erenagh in charge of church lands. There were seven ballibetoes in the parish of Templeport. Kildoagh was located in the ballybetagh of Bally Gortnekargie (Irish Baile Gort na Carraige, meaning 'The Town of Rock Field').

The 1609 Ulster Plantation Baronial Map depicts the townland as Kildough.

The 1652 Commonwealth Survey spells the name as Kildogh.

The 1665 Down Survey map depicts it as Kildough.

William Petty's 1685 map depicts it as Killdough.

In the Plantation of Ulster by grant dated 27 February 1610, King James VI and I granted the two polls of Kildough containing 100 acres to Cahir McOwen O'Reily, gentleman, at an annual rent of £1-1s-4d. The said Cathaoir O'Reilly was the nephew of two chiefs of the O'Reilly clan- Aodh Connallach mac Maolmhordha who was chief from 1565–1583 and Eamonn mac Maolmhordha who was chief from 1596–1601. He was also a brother of Cathal O'Reilly who received lands in Bellaleenan townland and first cousin of Donill Backagh McShane O'Reyly who was simultaneously granted lands in Burren (townland).

In the Irish Rebellion of 1641 Eleanor Reynolds of Lissanore made a deposition about the rebellion in Kildoagh as follows-

Ellenor Reinolds of Late of Lissanore in the County of Cauan widow aged 46 yeares or thereabouts duly sworne etc. saith that one Gillernoo mc Gowran of Kildoe Co. Cavan aforesaid, Hugh mc Manus oag mc Gowran of the same gent, Hugh oag mc Hugh mc Gowran with divers others to the number of about 300 hauing been in the night of 24 October 1641 at divers houses of the English inhabitants in the parish of Dromlane and robbed & stripped them of all their goods & wearing clothes they came the next morning to this deponents dwelling house and lands at Lissanore & then & there robbed & tooke away with them 71 Cowes, besides many yong Cattle, eleuen stoodd mares & other horses & Colts to the value of £200 & upwards & carryed them from the said land. The night following also there came to this deponents house Tirlogh o Reily a deputy sub sheriff to one Laughlin Bane, and Hugh mc Hugh mc Manus mc Gowran aforesaid Thomas mc Ooney mc Gowran, and Cormack mc Gowran of Munlogh uncle to the said Thomas Ooney mc Gowran and divers other Rebels to the number of three of or fower score, and there did abide drinking all night & often threatned to Murther this deponents husband and her father, which they often said they would doe & did attempt it but by fortune the Masse priest of the parish lodging there that night threatned them with Curses till they promised not to hurt them, but in the morning they plundered all the house & caried what was left by the former Rebells away with them. She further saith that the said Gillernooe did afterwards possesse himself of this deponents dwelling house & eleuen Reeks of hay, and a faire haggard full of Corne, as also her Corne in ground all worth at least £150 sterling and would not allow one peck of the said Corne to mainteine this deponent & her father, husband & family. She further saith that about a full moneth after the first rising one Charles mc Gouran of Ballimackgouran, Co. Cavan aforesaid came to the priests house situate neer this deponents dwelling house & thence tooke away 2 of this deponents trunks full of fine linen wearing apparell & plate & other goods & writings of great concernment, & broke open the said Trunks & made vse of the goods therin, though he had formerly engaged not to medle with them but to keep them safe for this deponent: whereby this deponent lost aboue £100 sterling. This deponent further saith that the aforesaid Tirlogh Rely and Hugh mc Hugh mc Manus oag mc Gowran sent divers Rogues to haue murthered this deponents husband & her father, but having some intelligence thereof they conveyed themselves to the said preists house where they were kept & hid for 14 daies till opportunity served to convey them to the Castle of Croghan. She further saith that in May 1642 this deponents mother not being able (because of age & weaknes) to goe to Croghan Castle was left behind with some of the tenants at Lissanore aforesaid, where she was about the tyme aforesaid barbarously murthered by one ffarell Groome mc Kellogher of CrossemacKellogher who confessed the said barbarous fact to divers persons that voluntarily did depose the same to be true. This deponent further saith that the said month of May 1642 she saw one Mr Richard Ash of Lissomean and one Loughlin bane mc Moister under sheriff of the County with divers other Rebels in armes & helping to besiege the Castle of Croghan. She further saith that the said Laughlin sent 2 or 3 Rogues about 3 daies before the first rising to this deponents said Land of Lissanore & thence they stolle a mare of this deponents & a 3 yeare old Colt worth £50; which Colt this deponent did see afterwards with the said Laughlin riding on him at the aforesaid tyme of besiedging of Croghan Castle, and that the said Mr Ash was riding on a white horse then with the said Laughlin as aforesaid. She further deposeth that about Midsomer 1642 the said Mr Ash did take from a Kinswoman of one ffrancis Sugden at Lissomean some parcells of plate by the way as the English were going towards Drogheda from Croghan Castle and Convoied by the said Ash with a great Company of Irish souldiers titherwards which was Contrary to the Conditions of quarter at the said Castle of Croghan agreed upon. And further she this Examinate deposeth not the marke [mark] of Ellenor Reinolds.

The aforesaid Gillernoo mc Gowran (Irish = Giolla na Naomh Mág Samhradháin) was the brother of Brian Magauran who was chief of the McGovern Clan from 1622 until his death, and uncle of the next chief Charles Magauran who held the chieftainship during the rebellion from 1641 to 1657. Gillernoo signed his name as Gillernew Mc Gauranes on a 'Petition of the inhabitants of Cavan to the lord deputy and council, 8 July 1629'. He is mentioned several times in witness statements about the rebellion (see Charles Magauran for same).

The aforesaid Hugh McManus Óg McGovern was the great-grandson of Tomás mac Maghnus Mág Samhradháin who was chief of the McGovern Clan from 1512-1532. In the Ulster Plantation he received a grant of lands in Bofealan, Drumane and Crossmakelagher.

The O'Reilly lands in Kildoagh were confiscated in the Cromwellian Act for the Settlement of Ireland 1652 and were distributed as follows-

The 1652 Commonwealth Survey lists the proprietor as Mr Henry Pigott, who also appears as owner of other townlands in the same survey.

In the Hearth Money Rolls compiled on 29 September 1663 there was one person paying the Hearth Tax in- Kildough- Richard Pratt.

A grant dated 30 January 1668 from King Charles II of England to Richard Pyett included, inter alia, lands of Killduffe containing 2 cartrons of 221 acres.

A deed dated 24 December 1720 between Morley Saunders and John Enery includes the lands of Killdough.

A deed dated 13 Nov 1738 includes: the Topps of Killdough.

A lease dated 10 December 1774 from William Crookshank to John Enery of Bawnboy includes the lands of Killdough, as does a further deed by John Enery dated 13 December 1774.

The 1790 Cavan Carvaghs list spells the name as Kildoagh.

When the Roman Catholic church in Port, Templeport was seized by the English Crown in 1590 as part of the Reformation in Ireland, the Catholics first held Mass during the Penal Laws (Ireland) at a Mass rock in Drumlougher townland and later, when the enforcement of the laws were relaxed, a Barn Church of the Holy Trinity was erected in 1796 in Kildoagh and closed on 19 August 1979 when a new church was opened in the neighbouring townland of Kilsob to the north.

A lease dated 17 September 1816 John Enery of Bawnboy includes Kildough.

The Tithe Applotment Books for 1827 list eighteen tithepayers in the townland.

The Kildoagh Valuation Office Field books are available for November 1839.

Griffith's Valuation of 1857 lists twenty seven tenant landholders in the townland with landlord Rev. Richard Connolly.

== Census ==
| Year | Population | Males | Females | Total Houses | Uninhabited |
|---|---|---|---|---|---|
| 1841 | 132 | 61 | 71 | 24 | 1 |
| 1851 | 94 | 47 | 47 | 18 | 0 |
| 1861 | 74 | 30 | 44 | 14 | 0 |
| 1871 | 66 | 31 | 35 | 15 | 1 |
| 1881 | 54 | 25 | 29 | 15 | 2 |
| 1891 | 47 | 21 | 26 | 13 | 2 |

In the 1901 census of Ireland, there are eighteen families listed in the townland, and in the 1911 census of Ireland there are only fourteen families listed in the townland.

== Antiquities ==
The only structure of historical interest in the townland seems to be the disused Holy Trinity Roman Catholic Church which is a very rare preserved example of an 18th-century Barn Church.
