= Owengallees =

Townland in the civil parish of Templeport, County Cavan, Ireland

Coordinates: 54.07514°N 7.810271°W

Owengallees Abhainn gallaois
- Townland
- Etymology: 'Rocky River'
- Interactive map of Owengallees
- Country: Ireland
- Province: Ulster
- County: County Cavan
- Civil Parish: Templeport
- Barony: Tullyhaw

Area
  - Total: 1.9016 km^{2} (0.7342 sq mi)
- (470 statute acres)
- Time zone: UTC+1 (IST)
  - Summer (DST): UTC+0 (GMT)

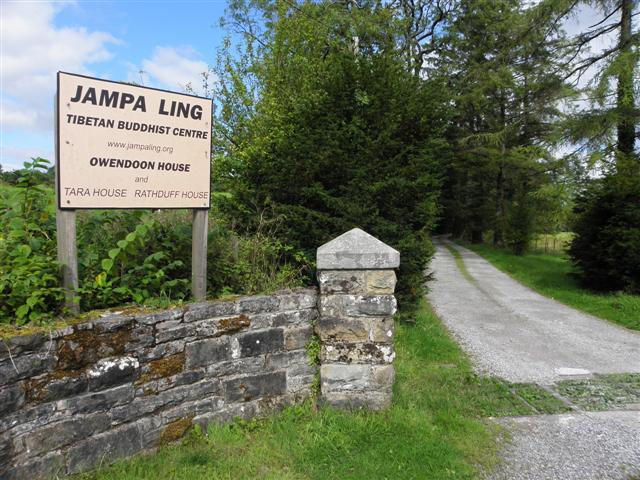
Entrance to Jampa Ling Buddhist Tibetan Centre, Owengallees townland, Templeport, County Cavan, Ireland

Owengallees (from Irish Abhainn gallaois, meaning 'Rocky River') is a townland in the civil parish of Templeport, County Cavan, Ireland. It lies in the Roman Catholic parish of Templeport and barony of Tullyhaw.

== Geography ==
Owengallees is bounded on the north by Gortnacargy in Corlough parish and Newtown, Templeport townlands, on the west by Drumlougher and Stranadarragh townlands, on the south by Boley townland and on the east by Gowlagh South, Mullaghmore, Templeport and Lakefield townlands. Its chief geographical features are Bunerky Lough (Irish = Loch Bun Adhairc = The Lake of the Butt of the Horn), Lakefield Lough, the River Blackwater, County Cavan, a forestry plantation, a spring well, some dug wells and some stone quarries. Owengallees is traversed by the L1037 road, minor roads and rural lanes. The townland covers 470 statute acres. A sub-division of the townland is called Owendoon (Abhain a Dúin = The Rivers of the Fort).

== History ==
In medieval times the barony of Tullyhaw was divided into economic taxation areas called ballibetoes, from the Irish Baile Biataigh (Anglicized as 'Ballybetagh'), meaning 'A Provisioner's Town or Settlement'. The original purpose was to enable the farmer, who controlled the baile, to provide hospitality for those who needed it, such as poor people and travellers. The ballybetagh was further divided into townlands farmed by individual families who paid a tribute or tax to the head of the ballybetagh, who in turn paid a similar tribute to the clan chief. The steward of the ballybetagh would have been the secular equivalent of the erenagh in charge of church lands. There were seven ballibetoes in the parish of Templeport. Owengallees was located in the ballybetagh of Bally Gortnekargie (Irish "Gort na Carraige", meaning 'The Field of the Rock').

Up until the 19th century Owengallees also included the modern townland of Drumlougher as a subdivision. Another name for Owengallees was Cunnoocenanare and Cossaunnanare (Irish Cnuas-na-ngadhar meaning 'the gathering of the hounds' and Casan na ngadhar meaning "the path of the hounds")

The 1609 Ulster Plantation Baronial Map depicts the townland as Owngalles. The 1652 Commonwealth Survey lists the townland as Owen Gallice. The 1665 Down Survey map depicts it as Owneganlis. William Petty's 1685 map depicts it as Owenganlis.

On 12 November 1590 Queen Elizabeth I of England granted a pardon (No. 5489) to James O Doylan, of Ownygalleise, horsekeeper for fighting against the Queen's forces.

In the Plantation of Ulster by grant dated 4 June 1611, King James VI and I granted, inter alia, two polls of Owingallis to Breene Og Magauran, gentleman. He was the son of Brian Óg Mág Samhradháin who was chief of the McGauran clan until his death in 1584 (On 30 April 1605 King James VI and I had granted a pardon to him as Brian McGauran of Tolaghagh, for fighting against the King's forces.). An Inquisition held in Cavan Town on 24 October 1631 found that the said Brian Óg McGauran by deed of trust dated 20 November 1614 granted the lands of Lissconnaught (Irish= 'Lios Connachta', meaning The Fort of the Descendants of Conn) comprising 2 polls in Owengallees, 2 polls in Teeboy townland in Corlough parish and a half poll in Bartonny, to the use of himself and his wife Mary O'Birn and after their death for their son Edmond McGovern, born in 1616. The said Brian Óg McGuaran died on 1 October 1631.

The McGovern lands in Owengallees were confiscated in the Cromwellian Act for the Settlement of Ireland 1652 and were distributed as follows:

The 1652 Commonwealth Survey lists the proprietor as Lieutenant-Colonel Tristram Beresford, who also appears as proprietor for several other Templeport townlands in the same survey.

In the Hearth Money Rolls compiled on 29 September 1663 there were three Hearth Tax payers in Owengallis- Cormucke McEdegany, Daniell Magawran and Donell McEdagany.

A further confirming grant dated 3 November 1666 was made by King Charles II of England to the aforementioned Sir Tristram Beresford, 1st Baronet included, inter alia, 217 acres of profitable land plus 15 acres & 2 roods of unprofitable land in Owen-Gally or Owengallis. By grant dated 11 September 1670 from King Charles II of England to said Sir Tristram Beresford, the lands of Owengally were included in the creation of a new Manor of Beresford.

A synod of the Roman Catholic Provincial Council of Armagh was held in Owengallees on 25 May 1669 where the Bishop of Kilmore, Eugene Sweeney tried to depose Thomas Fitzsimons, the vicar general of the diocese. Fitzsimons wrote- I was excommunicated once by virtue of a censure unjustly opposed by the late bishop of Kilmore in that farce of a council in Owengalles.

On 10 April 1716, Marcus Beresford, 1st Earl of Tyrone the son of the aforesaid Sir Tristram Beresford, granted a lease for lives of certain lands, including Owen Gally, to James Kirkwood of Owen Gally. In a marriage settlement made 18 Oct 1718 with his wife Katherine (née Lowther), the said James Kirkwood settled the lands, including Owen Gally, on his children. Katherine Lowther's sister-in-law, Jane Lowther (née Beresford), was the daughter of the aforesaid Sir Tristram Beresford, which is probably how the lease came about. James Kirkwood was son of Reverend James Kirkwood, Chaplain to King William III of England, Prebendary of Kilskeery and Rector of Magheracross parishes in County Fermanagh from 1693.

In the Templeport Poll Book of 1761 there was only one resident of Owengallees registered to vote in the 1761 Irish general election - Louther Kirkwood, who lived in the townland and owned a freehold there. Chris Carleton of Markethill, County Fermanagh was also entitled to vote because he owned land in Owengallees. They were each entitled to cast two votes. The four election candidates were Charles Coote, 1st Earl of Bellomont and Lord Newtownbutler (later Brinsley Butler, 2nd Earl of Lanesborough), both of whom were then elected Member of Parliament for Cavan County. The losing candidates were George Montgomery (MP) of Ballyconnell and Barry Maxwell, 1st Earl of Farnham. Kirkwood voted for Newtownbutler and Coote. Absence from the poll book either meant a resident did not vote or more likely was not a freeholder entitled to vote, which would mean most of the inhabitants of Owengallees.

The 1790 Cavan Carvaghs list spells the name as Uwengallish.

In 1804 the aforesaid Lowther Kirkwood of Mullinagrave, parish of Templeport, Co. Cavan, gentleman made the following will-

2 July 1804. To his grandnephew Lowther Brien, city of Dublin, attorney, and his heirs his lands of Awengallis, Ballylenan, Ballymagirill, Stranadarragh, Carnagimlie, Cullagh, Drumleden, Leitry [Leitra], Corlagh, Lananleragh [Lannanerriagh], Gowlanlea and Drumlogher, Co. Cavan, held under lease from the Beresford family. He had begun a suit in Chancery, Ireland, against John Brien, late of Salvon, Co. Fermanagh, deceased, for setting aside a fraudulent deed obtained by said John Brien, which suit against the representatives is to be continued by said Lowther Brien, his sole exor. Witnesses: John Johnston and Andrew Rutledge, both of Ballymagiril, and Thos. Stephenson, Drumleaden, Co. Cavan, gent. Memorial witnessed by: said Andrew Rutledge, and John Balfour, city of Dublin, attorney.

The Tithe Applotment Books for 1827 list thirty three tithepayers in the townland.

The Owengallees Valuation Office Field books are available for 1839–1840.

Griffith's Valuation of 1857 lists twenty nine tenant landholders in the townland owned by landlord Rev.Lord.JG Beresford.

On 6 July 1857 the Incumbered Estates Commission published the following notice-

In the Matter of the Estate of James Brien, Geo. Brien, Edward Brien and Francis Brien, Owners. Exparte by Isabella Crummer, Petitioner. The commissioners having ordered a Sale of the Lands of Shanadaragh and Curnagunlogh, Cullegh, Drumlohgher, Drumledin, Sananaragh, and Drumledin, and Corlough, situate in the Barony of Tullyhaw, and County of Cavan, held under lease dated the 10th April, 1718, from the Bishop Raphoe, for lives renewable for ever, and which Lands are included in the denominations of Ballymagord, Owngally, Gortneglough, Drumedin or Ballylennin, in said lease mentioned:

A deed dated 10 June 1875 now in the Cavan Archives Service (ref P017/0096) is described as-

Notice issued by the Landed Estates Court, Ireland, to tenants and adjoining owners and occupiers, informing them of the sale of part of the lands of Owengallees (Owen Gallows otherwise Owen Galles otherwise Owen Gallils), barony of Tullyhaw, County Cavan, containing 397 acres, 2 roods and 16 perches, the property of Henry George l'Estrange. Document incorporates rental and map of the lands to be sold.

In the 1860s George L'Estrange published monthly weather reports from Owendoon House in Owengallees in Symons's monthly meteorological magazine. In April 1859 a Report was prepared for Archbishop Beresford- "relative to a piece of land called Doonbeg in the Parish of Templeport, Barony of Tullyhaw and County of Cavan claimed by Mr L'Estrange as part of Owengallis".

The author Mrs Augusta Wardell, née Hunt, was a native of the townland. She published a book in 1912 entitled "Folk Tales of Breffny" under the pen name 'Bunda Hunt'. A deed dated 28 May 1920 describes the family members.

== Census ==
Year	Population	Males	Females	Total Houses	Uninhabited
1841	174	82	92	30	1
1851	123	58	65	20	0
1861	95	48	47	16	1
1871	54	33	31	13	1
1881	76	40	36	14	0
1891	82	42	40	15	0

In the 1901 census of Ireland, there are twenty families listed in the townland, and in the 1911 census of Ireland, there are only eighteen families listed in the townland.

== Antiquities ==
1. An earthen ringfort.
2. A crannóg 100 metres from the shore in Lakefield Lough.
3. A Bronze Age bronze axe in the National Museum of Ireland was found in Owengallees in 1927.Templeport Development Association - History - Bronze Axe heads
4. A bridge on the River Blackwater
5. Owendoon House built c.1850, now known as Jampa Ling Buddhist Retreat. Bawnboy and Templeport History Heritage and Folklore - Past and Present
6. A boathouse

== See also ==
- The Oxburgh Chalice
