= Dring, County Cavan =

Townland in Bilberry, County Cavan, Ireland

Coordinates: 54.057°N 7.575°W

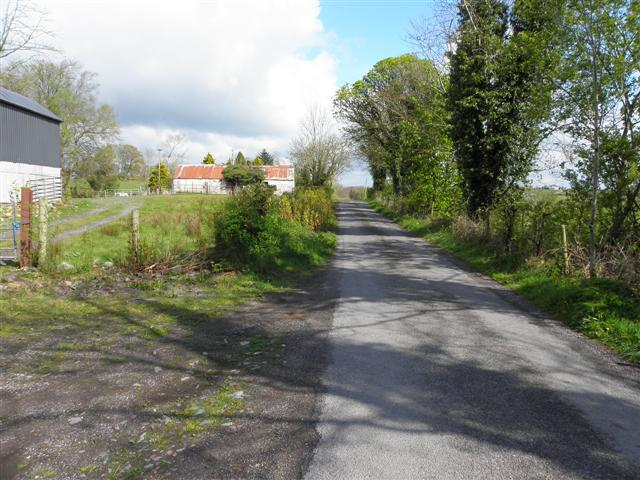
Road at Dring, County Cavan

Dring (from Irish Druing, meaning 'a company' or 'crowd') is a small townland in the civil parish of Kildallan, barony of Tullyhunco, County Cavan, Ireland.

== Geography ==
Dring is bounded on the west by Cornacrum townland, on the east by Clonkeen and Kildallan townlands, on the south by Drumminnion townland and on the north by Ardlougher and Clontygrigny townlands. Its chief geographical features are Clonty Lough, the Rag River, small streams, dug wells, spring wells and a gravel pit. Dring is traversed by minor public roads and rural lanes. The townland covers 178 acres (0.28 sq mi), including 14 acres of water.

== History ==
The Ulster Plantation Baronial map of 1609 depicts the name as Dringe. The Ulster Plantation grants of 1611 spell the townland name as Dronge. A 1615 lease spells the name as Dronge. A 1629 inquisition spells the name as Dronge. A 1630 inquisition spells the name as Dronge. A 1631 grant spells the name as Dronge. The 1652 Commonwealth Survey spells the townland as Dring.

From medieval times up to the early 1600s, the land belonged to the McKiernan Clan. At the start of the Plantation of Ulster in 1609, the lands of the McKiernans were confiscated, but some were later regranted to them. In the Plantation of Ulster grant dated 4 June 1611, King James VI and I granted 400 acres (160 hectares), or 7 poles (a poll is the local name for townland), of land in Tullyhunco at an annual rent of £4 5s. 4d., to Bryan McKearnan, gentleman, comprising the modern-day townlands of Clontygrigny, Cornacrum, Cornahaia, Derrinlester, Dring, Drumlarah, Ardlougher and Kiltynaskellan. Under the terms of the grant, McKearnan was obliged to build a house on this land. The said Brian 'Bán' Mág Tighearnán (anglicized 'Blonde' Brian McKiernan) was chief of the McKiernan Clan of Tullyhunco, County Cavan, Ireland, from 1588 until his death on 4 September 1622. In a visitation in autumn 1611 by the 1st Baron Carew (later created, in 1626, the 1st Earl of Totnes), it was recorded: McKyernan removed to his proportion and is about building a house. Lord Carew was the Governor of Guernsey at the time, and had previously served as Lord President of Munster. On 23 March 1615, Mág Tighearnán granted a lease on these lands to James Craig. On 14 March 1630, an Inquisition ordered by King Charles I, held in Cavan Town, stated that Brian bane McKiernan died on 4 September 1622, and his lands comprising seven poles and three pottles in Clonkeen, Clontygrigny, Cornacrum, Derrinlester, Dring townland, Killygorman, Kiltynaskellan and Mullaghdoo, Cavan, went to his nearest relatives. The most likely inheritors being Cahill, son of Owen McKiernan; Brian, son of Turlough McKiernan and Farrell, son of Phelim McKiernan, all aged over 21 and married. On 26 April 1631 a re-grant was made to Sir James Craige, which included the lands of Dronge, which also included several sub-divisions in the townland called Aghanerrie, Knocknecolom, Tawneskregrie, Tannegamuck, Knockneuer and Cortrasse. In the Irish Rebellion of 1641 the rebels occupied the townland of Dring. Sir James Craig died in the siege of Croaghan Castle on 8 April 1642. His land was inherited by his brother John Craig of Craig Castle, County Cavan, and of Craigston, County Leitrim, who was chief doctor to both King James I and Charles I.

After the Irish Rebellion of 1641 concluded, the rebels vacated the land and the 1652 Commonwealth Survey lists the townland as belonging to Lewis Craig and describes it as wasteland. In the Hearth Money Rolls compiled on 29 September 1663 there was one Hearth Tax payer in Dringe- Robert Perry. Lord John Carmichael (b.1710 - d.1787), the 4th Earl of Hyndford of Castle Craig, County Cavan, inherited the lands from the Craig estate. In 1758 Carmichael sold the lands to the Farnham Estate of Cavan. The estate papers are now in the National Library of Ireland and those papers mentioning Dring are at reference number MS 41,131 /10.

In the Cavan Poll Book of 1761, there was one person registered to vote in Dring in the Irish general election, 1761 - David Goodfellow. He was entitled to cast two votes. The two elected candidates were Charles Coote (later created, in 1767, the 1st Earl of Bellomont) and Lord Newtown-Butler (who later succeeded, in 1768, as the 2nd Earl of Lanesborough), both of whom were then deemed elected as MPs for Cavan County. The two losing candidates were George Montgomery of Ballyconnell and The Hon. Barry Maxwell (who later succeeded, in 1779, as the 3rd Baron Farnham and who was advanced in the peerage, in 1785, as the 1st Earl of Farnham (by the second creation)). Absence from the poll book either meant a resident did not vote or more likely was not a freeholder entitled to vote, which would mean most of the inhabitants of Dring.

The 1790 Cavan Carvaghs list spells the townland name as Dring.

Ambrose Leet's 1814 Directory spells the name as Dring.

In the 1825 Registry of Freeholders for County Cavan there was one freeholder registered in Dring- James Gwyne. He was a Forty-shilling freeholders holding a lease for lives from his landlord, Lord Farnham.

The Tithe Applotment Books for 1827 list nine tithepayers in the townland.

The Dring Valuation Office books are available for 1838.

Griffith's Valuation of 1857 lists eleven landholders in the townland.

David Poe, Senior, the grandfather of the author Edgar Allan Poe, was a native of Dring townland.

== Census ==
Year	Population	Males	Females	Total Houses	Uninhabited
1841	86	40	46	16	1
1851	71	32	39	12	0
1861	58	33	25	12	1
1871	45	23	22	8	0
1881	35	20	15	9	1
1891	37	17	20	8	0
1901	10 families listed.				
1911	10 families listed.				
2011	33	14	19	11	1
