= Evlagh More =

Townland in County Cavan, Ireland

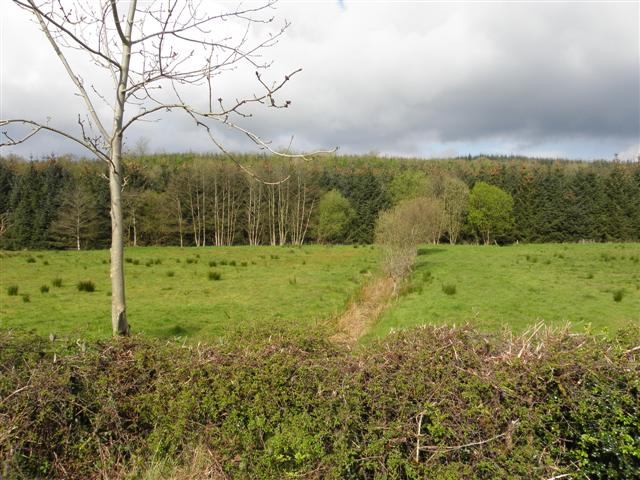
View of Evlagh More from Aghnacreevy

Evlagh More (Irish derived place name, Aibhleach Mór meaning 'The Big Place of Fires' (possibly from lime-burning).) is a townland in the civil parish of Kildallan, barony of Tullyhunco, County Cavan, Ireland.

== Geography ==
Evlagh More is bounded on the west by Evlagh Beg townland, on the east by Aghnacreevy and Drumminnion townlands, on the south by Drumlarah townland and on the north by Cornacrum townland. Its chief geographical features are the Rag River, small streams and forestry plantations. Evlagh More is traversed by minor public roads and rural lanes. The townland covers 139 acres.

== History ==
The 1609 Plantation of Ulster Baronial map depicts the townland as Eyulagh. A Plantation of Ulster grant dated 1611 spells the name as Evelagh. The 1641 Depositions spell the name as Leuella. The 1652 Commonwealth Survey spells the townland as Evlaghmore. The 1665 Down Survey map depicts it as Euelaghmore. William Petty's map of 1685 depicts it as Erelaghmore.

From medieval times up to the early 1600s, the land belonged to the McKiernan Clan.

In the Plantation of Ulster by grant dated 16 August 1611, King James VI and I granted, inter alia, Evelagh to Thomas Jones-Evelagh to Thomas Johnes, gentleman. At Cavan, on 26 July 1642, the aforesaid Thomas Jones and his son William Jones gave the names of rebel leaders in the Cavan Irish Rebellion of 1641, including, inter alia, Laighlen mac Torlough McKernan of Leuella, James mac Laighlen McKernan of same and Hugh mac Laighlen McKernan of same. They also stated- The Complaynt of William Jones gent. and Tho: Jones, his father, of Cornecrom in the County of Cavan, gent. sayth sworne & examined saith that on the seavententh of November last 1641 there came unto the habitacion of the deponent William Jones, [Weny] Sheridan of Molloughmore, Ffarrell mac Donell mac Ffarrell Oge McKernan of Aighavenaigh, Donell Oge McKernan of same and their nephew, which was freehoulders of the foresaid Aighavenaigh and violently with other assistants tooke away from the complayneant William Jones, fiftye English cowes price 125 li. ster, ten heffers 20 li. ster, eight yeare-olds 4 li. ster, five horsses and mares 10 li. ster, in corne & hay 40 li sterling, in apparell and househould stuffe 30 li. ster, all which sume amountinge to were worth 229 li. ster and sayd when they tooke away the foresaid goods that the said William Jones, the Complayneant, was a traytor and bade him goe for his Country England & further sayth mee And further theis deponents say that the parties mencioned in a note or scedule hereunto annexed are or were lately actors in the present Rebellion & bore and carryed armes with and for the Rebells against the Protestants whom they robbed and dispoyled of their goodes & did other outrages are theis vizt Tho: Jones Will: Jones Deposed July 26, 1642. In a further deposition dated 26 July 1642, the said Thomas Jones of Drumminnion, Kildallan parish stated- that on the 17th of November 1641 the deponent Thomas Jones by the procurement of Phillip mac Hugh mac Shane Rely, Edmond Rely, Hugh mac Shane mac Phillip Rely and Hugh mac Molmore Rely, was robbed by Patt Sheridan of Rillaigh, Donell Oge McKernan and his nephew heire of Aighaveny, Laighlen Oge O'Rorke de Killnemarue and Bryan O'Rorke of the same, of the goods following, viz. eightene melch Cowes price 36 li. ster, six heffers in calfe, six pownds sterling; three yearelings 30 s. sterling, foure horsses 12 li. sterling, Corne & hay price 4 0li. sterling, in ready mony x li. 10 s. sterling, in househould stuffe as plate pewter brasse, lynen wollen beddinge and apparell with other necessaries 40 li. sterling, in proffitts of lands per annum in the said County 16 li. sterling,.

After the Irish Rebellion of 1641 concluded, the 1652 Commonwealth Survey lists Evlaghmore as belonging to James Thornton. A confirming grant dated 30 January 1668 from King Charles II of England to James Thornton included 1 ½ polls containing 62 acres 1 rood and 8 perches in Evallaghmore.

A marriage settlement dated 7 March 1750 relates to the Faris family with lands in Evlaghmore etc.

In the Cavan Poll Book of 1761, there was one person registered to vote in Evelagh More in the Irish general election, 1761 - George Fairis of Mackan townland. He was entitled to cast two votes. The four election candidates were Charles Coote, 1st Earl of Bellomont and Lord Newtownbutler (later Brinsley Butler, 2nd Earl of Lanesborough), both of whom were then elected Member of Parliament for Cavan County. The losing candidates were George Montgomery (MP) of Ballyconnell and Barry Maxwell, 1st Earl of Farnham. Absence from the poll book either meant a resident did not vote or more likely was not a freeholder entitled to vote, which would mean most of the inhabitants of Evlagh More.

The 1790 Cavan Carvaghs list spells the name as Eulagh-more.

Ambrose Leet's 1814 Directory spells the name as Evlagh.

The Tithe Applotment Books 1823-1837 list seven tithepayers in the townland.

In 1832 one person in Evelaghmore was registered as a keeper of weapons- Alexander Bothwell who had one sword.

The Evlagh More Valuation Office books are available for May 1838.

On 13 November 1851 the following notice was published- INCUMBERED ESTATES COURT - Thursday, 13th Nov. - The Chief Commissioner sat in the Court, Henrietta-street, Dublin, to-day, for the purpose of selling incumbered property. In the matter of the estates of Williams James Thomas GALBRAITH, owner. Ex parte Morgan CROFTON, petitioner. Lot 1, the house and demesne of Macken, and Drumbinnis, Keilagh, Druminisdill, Drumcartagh, and Drumcannon, county of Cavan, containing £74. 0r. 15p. state measure, held in fee farm, producing a gross annual rental of £484, 11s, 10d., subject to two fee farm rents, one of £131, 18s. 6d., and the other of £62, 6s. 2d. The biddings proceeded from £4000 to £5390, at which sum Mrs. Elizabeth GALBRAITH became the purchaser. Lot 2, the fee simple lands of EVLAGHMORE, containing 140s. 1. 39p. statute measure, and producing an annual rental of £76, 11s, 8d. The first offer was £700., and Mr. W. Galbraith (the owner) was the purchaser for £1000.

Griffith's Valuation of 1857 lists four landholders in the townland.

== Census ==
Year	Population	Males	Females	Total Houses	Uninhabited
1841	35	17	18	5	0
1851	24	13	11	4	0
1861	28	14	14	4	0
1871	31	16	15	4	0
1881	18	11	7	4	0
1891	4	2	2	4	2

In the 1901 census of Ireland, there was one family listed in the townland.

In the 1911 census of Ireland, there was one family listed in the townland.

== Antiquities ==
1. A lime kiln
