= Cornacrum =

Townland in County Cavan, Ireland

Cornacrum (Irish derived place name, Corr na Croma meaning 'The Round Hill of the Plague or the Stooping'.) is a townland in the civil parish of Kildallan, barony of Tullyhunco, County Cavan, Ireland.

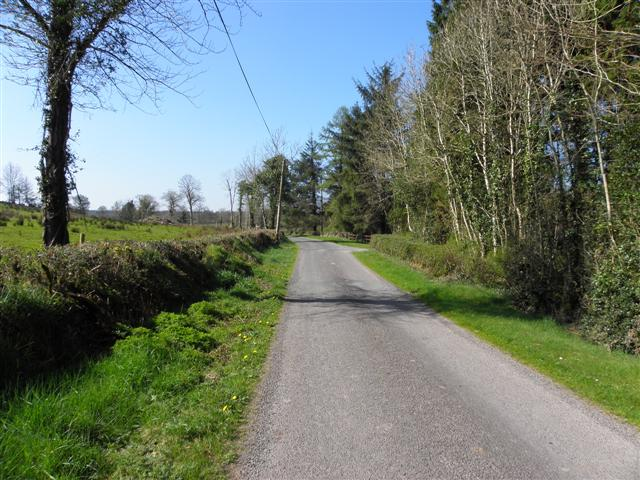
Road at Cornacrum (geograph 2870368)

== Geography ==
Cornacrum is bounded on the west by Evlagh Beg and Mullaghmore, Tullyhunco townlands, on the east by Dring townland and Drumminnion townlands, on the south by Evlagh More townland and on the north by Clontygrigny townland. Its chief geographical features are Clonty Lough, the Rag River, small streams, forestry plantations, a dug well, spring wells and a quarry. Cornacrum is traversed by minor public roads and rural lanes. The townland covers 251 acres, including 23 acres of water.

== History ==
The Ulster Plantation Baronial map of 1609 depicts the name as Cornacrome. The Ulster Plantation grants of 1611 spell the townland name as Cornacrum. A 1615 lease spells the name as Carnecrum. A 1629 inquisition spells the name as Cornacran. A 1630 inquisition spells the name as Cornecrome. A 1631 grant spells the name as Carnacran. The 1641 Depositions spell the name as Cornecrom. The 1652 Commonwealth Survey spells the townland as Cornecroma.

From medieval times up to the early 1600s, the land belonged to the McKiernan Clan. In the Plantation of Ulster in 1609 the lands of the McKiernans were confiscated, but some were later regranted to them. In the Plantation of Ulster grant dated 4 June 1611, King James VI and I granted 400 acres (160 hectares) or 7 poles (a poll is the local name for townland) of land in Tullyhunco at an annual rent of £4 5s. 4d., to Bryan McKearnan, gentleman, comprising the modern-day townlands of Clontygrigny, Cornacrum, Cornahaia, Derrinlester, Dring townland, Drumlarah, Ardlougher and Kiltynaskellan. Under the terms of the grant, McKearnan was obliged to build a house on this land. The said Brian 'Bán' Mág Tighearnán (anglicized 'Blonde' Brian McKiernan) was chief of the McKiernan Clan of Tullyhunco, County Cavan, Ireland from 1588 until his death on 4 September 1622. In a visitation by George Carew, 1st Earl of Totnes in autumn 1611, it was recorded, McKyernan removed to his proportion and is about building a house. On 23 March 1615, Mág Tighearnán granted a lease on these lands to James Craig. On 14 March 1630, an Inquisition of King Charles I of England held in Cavan Town stated that Brian bane McKiernan died on 4 September 1622, and his lands comprising seven poles and three pottles in Clonkeen, Clontygrigny, Cornacrum, Derrinlester, Dring townland, Killygorman, Kiltynaskellan and Mullaghdoo, Cavan went to his nearest relatives. The most likely inheritors being Cahill, son of Owen McKiernan; Brian, son of Turlough McKiernan and Farrell, son of Phelim McKiernan, all aged over 21 and married. On 26 April 1631 a re-grant was made to Sir James Craige, which included the lands of Carnacran, which also included several sub-divisions in the townland called Aghogreagh, Chorowe, Margebochegin, Tawchoboune, Genganby, Gerryhiggin, Monevalle, Leycreagh and Knocknecarm. In the Irish Rebellion of 1641 the rebels occupied the townland of Cornacrum. Sir James Craig died in the siege of Croaghan Castle on 8 April 1642. His land was inherited by his brother John Craig of Craig Castle, County Cavan and of Craigston, County Leitrim, who was chief doctor to both King James I and Charles I. At Cavan, on 26 July 1642, Thomas and William Jones of Cornecrum gave the names of rebel leaders in Cavan, including Ffarrell mac Phelyme Kernan of Cornecrom, Torlaigh mac Ffarrell McKernan of same, Bryan McKernan of same, Bryan O’Shenan of same and Shane McGilsanan of same.

After the Irish Rebellion of 1641 concluded, the rebels vacated the land and the 1652 Commonwealth Survey lists the townland as belonging to Lewis Craig. In the Hearth Money Rolls compiled on 29 September 1663 there were two Hearth Tax payers in Cornacroma- Loghlyn Masterson and Caher McKernan. Lord John Carmichael (b.1710 - d.1787), the 4th Earl of Hyndford of Castle Craig, County Cavan, inherited the lands from the Craig estate. In 1758 Carmichael sold the lands to the Farnham Estate of Cavan. The estate papers are now in the National Library of Ireland and those papers mentioning Cornacrum are at reference numbers MS 41,131 /8;21. F. 115 and 21. F. 118.

In the Cavan Poll Book of 1761, there was one person registered to vote in Cornacrum in the Irish general election, 1761 - William Farris. He was entitled to cast two votes. The four election candidates were Charles Coote, 1st Earl of Bellomont and Lord Newtownbutler (later Brinsley Butler, 2nd Earl of Lanesborough), both of whom were then elected Member of Parliament for Cavan County. The losing candidates were George Montgomery (MP) of Ballyconnell and Barry Maxwell, 1st Earl of Farnham. Absence from the poll book either meant a resident did not vote or more likely was not a freeholder entitled to vote, which would mean most of the inhabitants of Cornacrum.

The 1790 Cavan Carvaghs list spells the townland name as Cornacram.

Ambrose Leet's 1814 Directory spells the name as Corna-crum.

The Tithe Applotment Books for 1827 list six tithepayers in the townland.

The Cornacrum Valuation Office books are available for 1838.

Griffith's Valuation of 1857 lists nine landholders in the townland.

== Census ==
Year	Population	Males	Females	Total Houses	Uninhabited
1841	52	25	27	8	0
1851	35	18	17	6	0
1861	35	16	19	6	0
1871	45	22	23	7	0
1881	47	28	19	8	2
1891	38	21	17	6	0

In the 1901 census of Ireland, there were eight families listed in the townland.

In the 1911 census of Ireland, there were seven families listed in the townland.

== Antiquities ==
1. Cornacrum Protestant School, Roll No. 11,528. In 1890 there were 74 pupils.
2. A ford and stepping stones over a stream
3. Cornacrum Cottage
