= Mullaghmore, Tullyhunco =

Townland in County Cavan, Ireland

Mullaghmore, Tullyhunco (Irish derived place name, Mullach Mór meaning 'The Big Summit'.) is a townland in the civil parish of Kildallan, barony of Tullyhunco, County Cavan, Ireland.

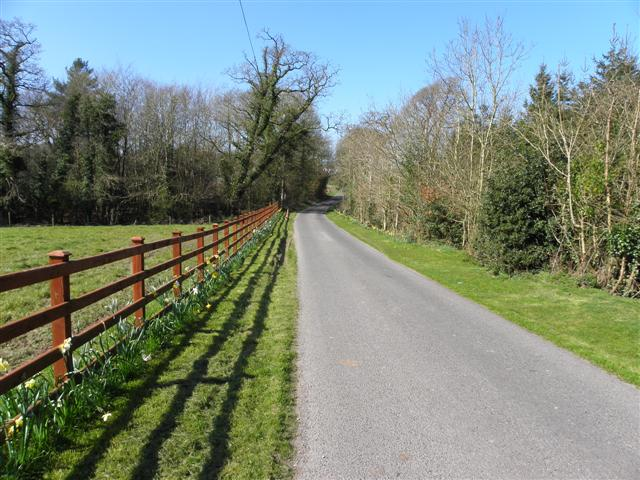
Road at Mullaghmore (geograph 2870406)

== Geography ==
Mullaghmore is bounded on the west by Kiltynaskellan townland, on the east by Clontygrigny and Cornacrum townlands, on the south by Evlagh Beg and Greaghacholea townlands and on the north by Callaghs townland. Its chief geographical features are Mullaghmore Hill which reaches a height of 392 feet, small streams, forestry plantations and dug wells. Mullaghmore is traversed by minor public roads and rural lanes. The townland covers 460 acres.

== History ==
The Ulster Plantation Baronial map of 1609 depicts the name as Malachmore. The Ulster Plantation grants of 1611 spell the townland name as Mullamore. The 1641 depositions spell it as Molloughmore. The 1652 Commonwealth Survey spells the townland as Mullaghmore. The 1665 Down survey map depicts it as Mullaghmore. A 1669 grant spells it as Mullaghmore. William Petty's 1685 map depicts it as Mullaghmore.

From medieval times up to the early 1600s, the land belonged to the McKiernan Clan. In the Plantation of Ulster by grant dated 27 February 1610, along with other lands, King James VI and I granted one poll of Mullamore to William O'Shereden, gentleman, Cheefe of his Name. William Sheridan was the chief of the Sheridan Clan in County Cavan. He was the son of the previous chief, Hugh Duff O'Sheridan of Togher townland, Kilmore parish, County Cavan. William was the ancestor of the famous Sheridan theatrical family. William died sometime before 1638 leaving two sons, Owen and Patrick (of Raleagh townland, Kildallan parish). Owen Sheridan succeeded to his father's lands and this was confirmed by a grant to him by Charles I of England dated 6 March 1637. Owen's son Denis was born in 1612 and became a Catholic priest in charge of Kildrumferton parish, County Cavan. He later converted to Protestantism and on 10 June 1634 William Bedell, the Protestant Bishop of Kilmore, ordained him as a Minister of the Church of Ireland and two days later Denis was collated to the Vicarage of Killasser in the Diocese of Kilmore. Denis had several children, including William Sheridan (Bishop of Kilmore and Ardagh) 1682-1691 (his son Donald kept up the Templeport connection by marrying Mrs Enery of Bawnboy); Patrick Sheridan, Cloyne, Protestant Bishop of Cloyne (1679-1682) and Sir Thomas Sheridan (politician) Chief Secretary of State for Ireland (1687-1688).

The aforesaid Owen Sheridan took part in the Irish Rebellion of 1641. At Cavan, on 26 July 1642, Thomas Jones and his son William Jones stated- The Complaynt of William Jones gent. and Tho: Jones, his father, of Cornecrom in the County of Cavan, gent. sayth sworne & examined saith that on the seavententh of November last 1641 there came unto the habitacion of the deponent William Jones, [Weny] Sheridan of Molloughmore, Ffarrell mac Donell mac Ffarrell Oge McKernan of Aighavenaigh, Donell Oge McKernan of same and their nephew, which was freehoulders of the foresaid Aighavenaigh and violently with other assistants tooke away from the complayneant William Jones, fiftye English cowes price 125 li. ster, ten heffers 20 li. ster, eight yeare-olds 4 li. ster, five horsses and mares 10 li. ster, in corne & hay 40 li sterling, in apparell and househould stuffe 30 li. ster, all which sume amountinge to were worth 229 li. ster and sayd when they tooke away the foresaid goods that the said William Jones, the Complayneant, was a traytor and bade him goe for his Country England & further sayth mee And further theis deponents say that the parties mencioned in a note or scedule hereunto annexed are or were lately actors in the present Rebellion & bore and carryed armes with and for the Rebells against the Protestants whom they robbed and dispoyled of their goodes & did other outrages are theis vizt Tho: Jones Will: Jones Deposed July 26, 1642.

After the Irish Rebellion of 1641 concluded, the townland was confiscated in the Cromwellian Settlement and the 1652 Commonwealth Survey lists it as belonging to William Madders & others, who were also listed as owners of the adjoining townland of Greaghacholea. In the Hearth Money Rolls compiled on 29 September 1663 there were two Hearth Tax payers in Mullaghmore- Sean O Banan and Owen McDonell. Part of the townland was later given in a grant dated 9 September 1669 from King Charles II, to Arthur, Earl Annesley, as 144 acres and 7 perches of profitable land and 60 acres of unprofitable land in the north-east part of Mullaghmore at a rent of £1-18s-10 1/2d per annum. The rest of the townland was included in a grant dated 7 July 1669 from King Charles II, to John, Lord Viscount Massareene, which included 113 acres and 24 perches of profitable land and 46 acres and 16 perches of unprofitable land in ye south part of James Thornton's retrenchments in Mullaghmore.

In the Cavan Poll Book of 1761, there was one person registered to vote in Mullaghmore in the Irish general election, 1761 - John Coulson, Esq. of Belmount, County Fermanagh.. He was entitled to cast two votes. The four election candidates were Charles Coote, 1st Earl of Bellomont and Lord Newtownbutler (later Brinsley Butler, 2nd Earl of Lanesborough), both of whom were then elected Member of Parliament for Cavan County. The losing candidates were George Montgomery (MP) of Ballyconnell and Barry Maxwell, 1st Earl of Farnham. Absence from the poll book either meant a resident did not vote or more likely was not a freeholder entitled to vote, which would mean most of the inhabitants of Mullaghmore.

The 1790 Cavan Carvaghs list spells the name as Mullaghmore.

Ambrose Leet's 1814 Directory states that the occupier of Bilberry-hill was David Irwin.

The Tithe Applotment Books 1823-1837 list twenty tithepayers in the townland.

The Mullaghmore Valuation Office books are available for 1838.

Griffith's Valuation of 1857 lists fourteen landholders in the townland.

== Census ==
Year	Population	Males	Females	Total Houses	Uninhabited
1841	208	105	103	35	1
1851	110	62	48	22	0
1861	127	63	64	24	0
1871	129	60	69	26	0
1881	97	53	44	21	1
1891	89	48	41	21	1

In the 1901 census of Ireland, there were twenty-eight families listed in the townland.

In the 1911 census of Ireland, there were twenty-one families listed in the townland.

== Antiquities ==
1. Bilberry Hill House
2. A lime-kiln
3. A Mass-Glen. The 1938 Dúchas Folklore collection has a statement from James Shannon (b.1862)- About a mile from the school in the townland of Aughnacreevy is a hill known as the Priest's Hill. Here a priest lived in the Penal Days and it is said that he celebrated Mass in a glen in Mullaghmore, not far from the village of Ardlogher. I have heard on good authority that the priest was a Father Brian McGurrin and that many miracles were performed by him. He was buried in the old grave-yard known locally as the relic. Here St Dallan's Church founded about the year 580, stood.
