= Aghnacreevy =

Townland in County Cavan, Ireland

Coordinates: 54.0422°N 7.5782°W

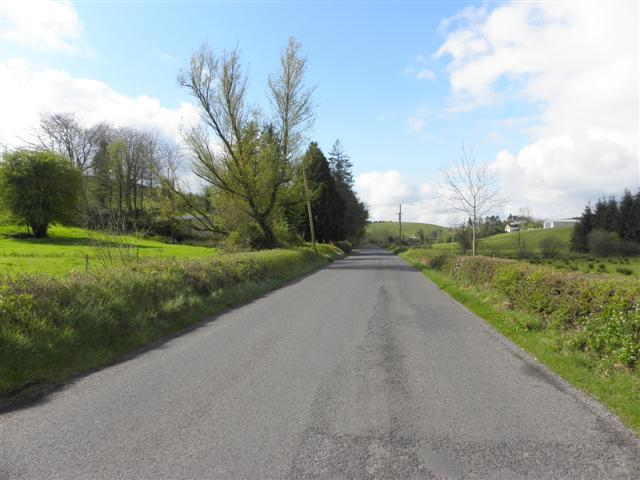
Road at Aghnacreevy

Aghnacreevy (Irish derived place name, either Achadh na Craoibhe meaning 'The Field of the Wide-Branching Tree' or Áth na Craoibhe meaning 'The Ford of the Wide-Branching Tree'.) is a townland in the civil parish of Kildallan, barony of Tullyhunco, County Cavan, Ireland.

== Geography ==
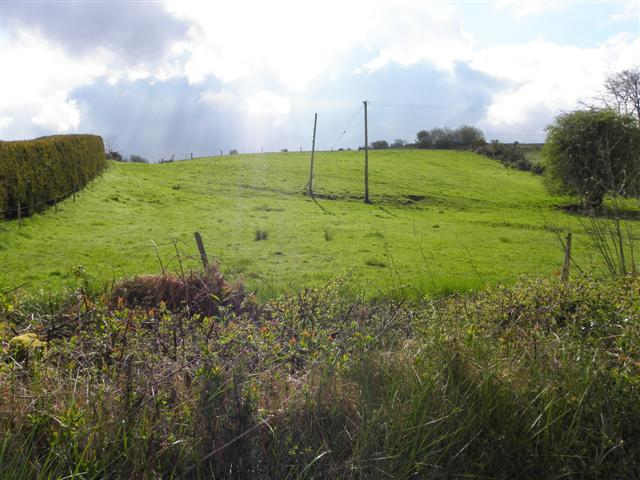
A field in Aghnacreevy townland

Aghnacreevy is bounded on the north by Drumminnion townland, on the west by Drumlarah and Evlagh More townlands, on the south by Mullaghdoo, Cavan townland and on the east by Mackan townland. Its chief geographical features are Mullaghdoo Lough, the Rag River, small streams, a marsh, spring wells and a wood. Aghnacreevy is traversed by minor public roads and rural lanes. The townland covers 240 acres.

== History ==
From medieval times up to the early 1600s, the land belonged to the McKiernan Clan.

The 1609 Plantation of Ulster Map depicts the townland as Aghnacrivie. A grant of 1610 spells the name as Aghnacriny. A lease of 1611 spells the name as Aghadruvie. An inquisition of 1629 spells the name as Aghnacrevie. The 1641 Depositions spell the name as Aighnecreue and Aighecreve. The 1652 Commonwealth Survey spells it as Aghonecreevy.

In the Plantation of Ulster King James VI and I by grant dated 27 June 1610, granted the Manor of Keylagh, which included one poll in Aghnacriny, to John Achmootie, a Scottish Groom of the Bedchamber. His brother Alexander Achmootie was granted the neighbouring Manor of Dromheada. On 16 August 1610 John Aghmootie sold his lands in Tullyhunco to James Craig. On 1 May 1611 James Craig leased, inter alia, 1 poll of Aghadruvie to Corhonogho McKernan. On 29 July 1611 Arthur Chichester, 1st Baron Chichester and others reported that John Auchmothy and Alexander Auchmothye have not appeared at the lands awarded to them. James Craige is their deputy for five years, who has brought 4 artificers of divers sorts with their wives and families and 2 other servants. Stone raised for building a mill and trees felled, a walled house with a smith's forge built, 4 horses and mares upon the grounds with competent arms. An Inquisition held at Ballyconnell on 2 November 1629 stated that the poll of Aghnacrevie contained five sub-divisions named Shehan, Knocknemanan, Legneslen, Gortinsaheabod and Attinekeille. Sir James Craig died in the siege of Croaghan Castle on 8 April 1642. His land was inherited by his brother John Craig of Craig Castle, County Cavan and of Craigston, County Leitrim, who was chief doctor to both King James I and Charles I. At Cavan, on 26 July 1642, Thomas and William Jones gave the names of rebel leaders in the Cavan Irish Rebellion of 1641, including Conor O’Donough and Ffarrell Daly of Aighnecreue or Aighecreve. The 1652 Commonwealth Survey states the owner was Lady Craig. In the Hearth Money Rolls compiled on 29 September 1663 there was one Hearth Tax payer in Aghanecryny- Robert Bary.

In the Cavan Poll Book of 1761, there was one person registered to vote in Aghnacreevy in the Irish general election, 1761: William Blakeley. He was entitled to cast two votes. The four election candidates were Charles Coote, 1st Earl of Bellomont and Lord Newtownbutler (later Brinsley Butler, 2nd Earl of Lanesborough), both of whom were then elected Member of Parliament for Cavan County. The losing candidates were George Montgomery (MP) of Ballyconnell and Barry Maxwell, 1st Earl of Farnham. Absence from the poll book either meant a resident did not vote or, more likely, was not a freeholder entitled to vote, which would mean most of the inhabitants of Aghnacreevy.

The 1790 Cavan Carvaghs list spells the townland name as Aghucreevy.

Ambrose Leet's 1814 Directory spells the name as Aughnacrevy.

The 1825 Tithe Applotment Books list twelve tithepayers in the townland.

The Aghnacreevy Valuation Office books are available for April 1838.

Griffith's Valuation of 1857 lists fourteen landholders in the townland.

The landlord of most of Aghnacreevy in the 19th century was William Cook.

== Census ==
| Year | Population | Males | Females | Total Houses | Uninhabited |
|---|---|---|---|---|---|
| 1841 | 151 | 71 | 80 | 23 | 0 |
| 1851 | 61 | 28 | 33 | 10 | 0 |
| 1861 | 56 | 27 | 29 | 10 | 0 |
| 1871 | 40 | 18 | 22 | 10 | 0 |
| 1881 | 28 | 14 | 14 | 10 | 0 |
| 1891 | 36 | 23 | 13 | 8 | 0 |

In the 1901 census of Ireland, there are eight families listed in the townland.

In the 1911 census of Ireland, there are eight families listed in the townland.
