= Clonkeen =

Townland in County Cavan, Ireland

Clonkeen (Irish-derived place name, Cluain Caoin meaning 'The Beautiful Meadow') is a townland in the civil parish of Kildallan, barony of Tullyhunco, County Cavan, Ireland.

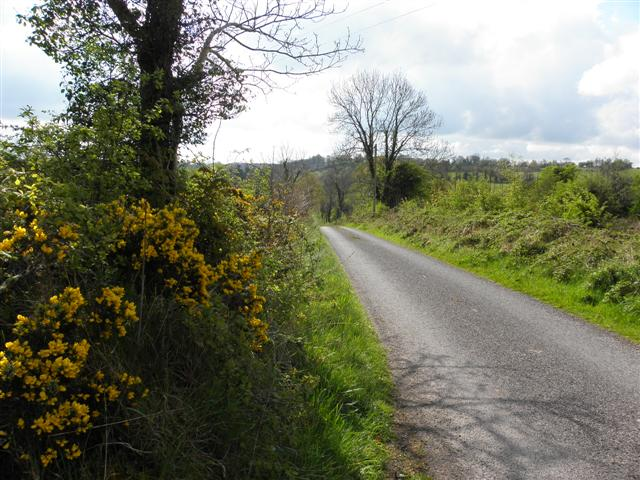
Road at Clonkeen (geograph 2914435)

== Geography ==
Clonkeen is bounded on the west by Dring townland and Drumminnion townland, on the east by Claragh and Keilagh townlands, on the south by Mackan townland and on the north by Kildallan townland. Its chief geographical features are Clonkeen Hill which rises to 351 feet, small streams and spring wells. Clonkeen is traversed by minor public roads and rural lanes. The townland covers 193 acres. A sub-division of the townland is called Lismonly (Irish derived place name, Lios Muinlighe meaning Fort of the Puddle).

== History ==
From medieval times up to the early 1600s, the townland belonged to the McKiernan Clan. Their lands were divided into units called a ballybetagh. A survey conducted in 1608 stated that one of these was named Ballyclonekyne containing 16 polls or townlands, which was centered on Clonkeen townland.

The 1609 Plantation of Ulster Map depicts the townland as Clonkine. A grant of 1610 spells the name as Clonkeine. A lease of 1611 spells the name as Clonkenie. An inquisition of 1629 spells the name as Clonkin. The 1652 Commonwealth Survey spells it as Cloonkeen.

In the Plantation of Ulster in 1609 Clonkeen was confiscated from the McKiernans and King James VI and I by grant dated 27 June 1610, granted the Manor of Keylagh, which included one poll in Clonkeine, to John Achmootie, a Scottish Groom of the Bedchamber. His brother Alexander Achmootie was granted the neighbouring Manor of Dromheada. On 16 August 1610 John Aghmootie sold his lands in Tullyhunco to James Craig. On 29 July 1611 Arthur Chichester, 1st Baron Chichester and others reported that John Auchmothy and Alexander Auchmothye have not appeared at the lands awarded to them. James Craige is their deputy for five years, who has brought 4 artificers of divers sorts with their wives and families and 2 other servants. Stone raised for building a mill and trees felled, a walled house with a smith's forge built, 4 horses and mares upon the grounds with competent arms. On 1 May 1611 James Craig leased, inter alia, 1 poll of Clonkenie to Eugene mac Cahell McKernan. Eugene must have sold his leasehold interest to his chief, Brian 'Bán' Mág Tighearnán, as an Inquisition of King Charles I of England held in Cavan Town on 14 March 1630, stated that Brian bane McKiernan died on September 4, 1622, and his lands comprising seven poles and three pottles in Clonkeen, Clontygrigny, Cornacrum, Derrinlester, Dring townland, Killygorman, Kiltynaskellan and Mullaghdoo, Cavan went to his nearest relatives. The most likely inheritors being Cahill, son of Owen McKiernan; Brian, son of Turlough McKiernan and Farrell, son of Phelim McKiernan, all aged over 21 and married.

An Inquisition held at Ballyconnell on 2 November 1629 stated that the poll of Clonkin contained nine sub-divisions named Honemore, Tonnaghard, Ternotonefleigh, Reaghin, Couleneulthie, Knockedenclonyn, Mohor-Cargyn, Attinanowle and Conla.

In the Irish Rebellion of 1641 the rebels occupied Clonkeen. Sir James Craig died in the siege of Croaghan Castle on 8 April 1642. His land was inherited by his brother John Craig of Craig Castle, County Cavan and of Craigston, County Leitrim, who was chief doctor to both King James I and Charles I. Sir James Craig died in the siege of Croaghan Castle on 8 April 1642. His land was inherited by his brother John Craig of Craig Castle, County Cavan and of Craigston, County Leitrim, who was chief doctor to both King James I and Charles I.

After the Irish Rebellion of 1641 concluded, the rebels vacated the land and the 1652 Commonwealth Survey lists the townland as belonging to Lewis Craig. It lists Lismoonly as also belonging to Lewis Craig. In the Hearth Money Rolls compiled on 29 September 1663 there were four Hearth Tax payers in Clankin- William Cranston, William Liddle, John Mophett and Thomas Mageeah. Thomas Mageeah had two hearths, which indicates a larger house than the rest who had one hearth each.

In the Cavan Poll Book of 1761, there were two people registered to vote in Clonkeen in the Irish general election, 1761 - Archibald Armstrong and John Laynge. They were entitled to cast two votes each. The four election candidates were Charles Coote, 1st Earl of Bellomont and Lord Newtownbutler (later Brinsley Butler, 2nd Earl of Lanesborough), both of whom were then elected Member of Parliament for Cavan County. The losing candidates were George Montgomery (MP) of Ballyconnell and Barry Maxwell, 1st Earl of Farnham. Absence from the poll book either meant a resident did not vote or more likely was not a freeholder entitled to vote, which would mean most of the inhabitants of Clonkeen.

The 1790 Cavan Carvaghs list spells the townland name as Clonkeen.

In the 19th century the townland belonged to the Farnham Estate of Cavan. The estate papers are now in the National Library of Ireland and those papers mentioning Clonkeen are at reference numbers MS 41,131/5 21. F. 118.

In the 1825 Registry of Freeholders for County Cavan there was one freeholder registered in Clonkeene: Thomas Reilly. He was a Forty-shilling freeholders holding a lease for lives from his landlord, Lord Farnham.

The Tithe Applotment Books for 1827 list seven tithepayers in the townland.

The Clonkeen Valuation Office books are available for April 1838.

Griffith's Valuation of 1857 lists twelve landholders in the townland.

== Census ==
Year	Population	Males	Females	Total Houses	Uninhabited
1841	62	25	37	13	1
1851	51	26	25	8	1
1861	46	22	24	8	0
1871	49	21	28	8	0
1881	45	20	25	8	0
1891	48	24	24	8	0

In the 1901 census of Ireland, there are fifteen families listed in the townland.

In the 1911 census of Ireland, there are ten families listed in the townland.

== Antiquities ==
1. Clonkeen hedge-school. The Second Report of the Commissioners of Irish Education Inquiry of 1826 states that Thomas McLoughlin, a Roman Catholic, ran a pay school in Clonkeen in a clay house valued at £12, for 71 pupils (39 boys and 32 girls), of which 36 were Roman Catholic, 26 Church of Ireland and 16 Presbyterian. The teacher’s pay was £12 per annum.
