= Clontygrigny =

Townland in County Cavan, Ireland

Clontygrigny (Irish derived place name, either Cluainte Gruigne meaning 'The Lawns of the Inhospitable People' or Cluainte Uí Ghrignigh meaning 'Grigney's Meadows'.) is a townland in the civil parish of Kildallan, barony of Tullyhunco, County Cavan, Ireland.

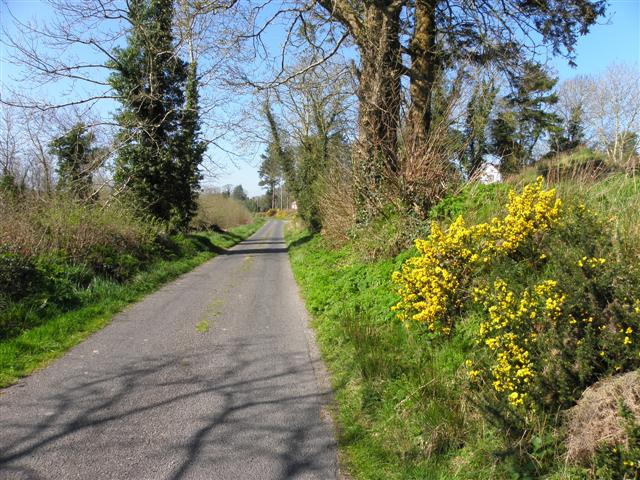
Road at Clontygigny, Ardlougher (geograph 2870401)

== Geography ==
Clontygrigny is bounded on the west by Callaghs and Killarah townlands, on the east by Aghaweenagh, Ardlougher and Dring townland, on the south by Cornacrum and Mullaghmore, Tullyhunco townlands and on the north by Fartrin townland. Its chief geographical features are Greenville Lough, Clonty Lough, the Rag River, small streams, forestry plantations, dug wells and a quarry. Clontygrigny is traversed by minor public roads and rural lanes. The townland covers 378 acres, including 29 acres of water.

== History ==
The Ulster Plantation Baronial map of 1609 depicts the name as Clontigrny. The Ulster Plantation grants of 1611 spell the townland name as Clontegerrin. A 1615 lease spells the name as Clontegrigenie. A 1629 inquisition spells the name as Clontegrigenie. A 1630 inquisition spells the name as Clonty. A 1631 grant spells the name as Clontegrigonie. The 1652 Commonwealth Survey spells the townland as Cloontigriggny. The locals currently pronounce the name in an abbreviated form as Clinty.

From medieval times up to the early 1600s, the land belonged to the McKiernan Clan. In the Plantation of Ulster in 1609 the lands of the McKiernans were confiscated, but some were later regranted to them. In the Plantation of Ulster grant dated 4 June 1611, King James VI and I granted 400 acres (160 hectares) or 7 poles (a poll is the local name for townland) of land in Tullyhunco at an annual rent of £4 5s. 4d., to Bryan McKearnan, gentleman, comprising the modern-day townlands of Clontygrigny, Cornacrum, Cornahaia, Derrinlester, Dring, Drumlarah, Ardlougher and Kiltynaskellan. Under the terms of the grant, McKearnan was obliged to build a house on this land. The said Brian 'Bán' Mág Tighearnán (anglicized 'Blonde' Brian McKiernan) was chief of the McKiernan Clan of Tullyhunco, County Cavan, Ireland from 1588 until his death on 4 September 1622. In a visitation by George Carew, 1st Earl of Totnes in autumn 1611, it was recorded, McKyernan removed to his proportion and is about building a house. On 23 March 1615, Mág Tighearnán granted a lease on these lands to James Craig. On 14 March 1630, an Inquisition of King Charles I of England held in Cavan Town stated that Brian bane McKiernan died on 4 September 1622, and his lands comprising seven poles and three pottles in Clonkeen, Clontygrigny, Cornacrum, Derrinlester, Dring townland, Killygorman, Kiltynaskellan and Mullaghdoo, Cavan went to his nearest relatives. The most likely inheritors being Cahill, son of Owen McKiernan; Brian, son of Turlough McKiernan and Farrell, son of Phelim McKiernan, all aged over 21 and married. On 26 April 1631 a re-grant was made to Sir James Craige, which included the lands of Clontegrigonie, which also included sub-divisions in the townland called Corraghtmaght, Tawnnemuckellagh, Tawnelagh and Aghbellenagheneddie. Sir James Craig died in the siege of Croaghan Castle on 8 April 1642. His land was inherited by his brother John Craig of Craig Castle, County Cavan and of Craigston, County Leitrim, who was chief doctor to both King James I and Charles I.

After the Irish Rebellion of 1641 concluded, the rebels vacated the land and the 1652 Commonwealth Survey lists the townland as belonging to Lewis Craig. Lord John Carmichael (b.1710 - d.1787), the 4th Earl of Hyndford of Castle Craig, County Cavan, inherited the lands from the Craig estate. In 1758 Carmichael sold the lands to the Farnham Estate of Cavan. The estate papers are now in the National Library of Ireland and those papers mentioning Clontygrigny are at reference numbers MS 41,131 /6 and 21. F. 118.

In the Cavan Poll Book of 1761, there was one person registered to vote in Clontygrigny in the Irish general election, 1761 - Alexander Finlay of Ardlougher. He was entitled to cast two votes. The four election candidates were Charles Coote, 1st Earl of Bellomont and Lord Newtownbutler (later Brinsley Butler, 2nd Earl of Lanesborough), both of whom were then elected Member of Parliament for Cavan County. The losing candidates were George Montgomery (MP) of Ballyconnell and Barry Maxwell, 1st Earl of Farnham. Absence from the poll book either meant a resident did not vote or more likely was not a freeholder entitled to vote, which would mean most of the inhabitants of Clontygrigny.

The 1790 Cavan Carvaghs list spells the townland name as Contigregny.

The Tithe Applotment Books for 1827 list eight tithepayers in the townland.

In 1832 one person in Clontygrigny was registered as a keeper of weapons- James Sewel who had one gun and one pistol.

The Clontygrigny Valuation Office books are available for May 1838.

Griffith's Valuation of 1857 lists twenty-four landholders in the townland.

== Census ==
Year	Population	Males	Females	Total Houses	Uninhabited
1841	120	64	56	19	2
1851	79	38	41	15	0
1861	79	34	45	16	0
1871	54	29	25	14	2
1881	63	34	29	14	0
1891	68	37	31	14	1

In the 1901 census of Ireland, there are twenty families listed in the townland.

In the 1911 census of Ireland, there are fourteen families listed in the townland.

== Antiquities ==
1. Crannog. The 'Archaeological Inventory of County Cavan' (Site No.1484) describes it as- Small circular island (diam. c.20m) marked on OS 1836 and 1876 eds. In Greenville Lough, c. 60m from the shoreline.
2. Ardlougher triple-arch stone road bridge, built c.1780.
3. Savoy Cottage
4. Lime kilns
