= Drummany =

Townland in County Cavan, Ireland

Drummany (Irish derived place name, either Droim Eanaigh meaning 'The Hill-Ridge of the Marsh' or Droim Manaigh meaning 'The Hill-Ridge of the Monk'.) is a townland in the civil parish of Kildallan, electoral district of Diamond, barony of Tullyhunco, County Cavan, Ireland.

== Geography ==
Drummany is bounded on the north by Drumlarah and Mullaghdoo, Cavan townlands, on the west by Drumcrow North and Tonaloy townlands, on the south by Laheen townland and on the east by Makief townland. Its chief geographical features are Patterson’s Lough (which is named after John Patterson of Hill House who owned the townland in the early 19th century), small streams, spring wells and a forestry plantation. Drummany is traversed by the regional R199 road (Ireland), the local road L5065, minor public roads and rural lanes. The townland covers 176 acres.

== History ==
From medieval times up to the early 1600s, the land belonged to the McKiernan Clan.

The 1609 Plantation of Ulster Map depicts the townland as Dromany Slut Edward (Gaelic- Sliocht Edward = The offspring of Edward McKiernan). A grant of 1610 spells the name as Dromany Slutedwarid. A lease of 1611 spells the name as Dourany. An inquisition of 1629 spells the name as Dromany. The 1652 Commonwealth Survey spells it as Dromany.

In the Plantation of Ulster King James VI and I by grant dated 27 June 1610, granted the Manor of Keylagh, which included one poll in Dromany Slutedwarid, to John Achmootie, a Scottish Groom of the Bedchamber. His brother Alexander Achmootie was granted the neighbouring Manor of Dromheada. On 16 August 1610 John Aghmootie sold his lands in Tullyhunco to James Craig. On 1 May 1611 James Craig leased 1 poll of Dourany to Gillelo Oge McKernan. On 29 July 1611 Arthur Chichester, 1st Baron Chichester and others reported that John Auchmothy and Alexander Auchmothye have not appeared at the lands awarded to them. James Craige is their deputy for five years, who has brought 4 artificers of divers sorts with their wives and families and 2 other servants. Stone raised for building a mill and trees felled, a walled house with a smith's forge built, 4 horses and mares upon the grounds with competent arms. An Inquisition held at Ballyconnell on 2 November 1629 stated that the poll of Dromany contained ten sub-divisions named Mullogagh, Gortin-Dromany, Cartusker, Dromgony, Graphagagh, Moyneneville, Atenendycorghie, Tawnevally, Tawnenemgallagagh and Tawnemuller. Sir James Craig died in the siege of Croaghan Castle on 8 April 1642. His land was inherited by his brother John Craig of Craig Castle, County Cavan and of Craigston, County Leitrim, who was chief doctor to both King James I and Charles I. The 1652 Commonwealth Survey states the owner was Lewis Craig. In the Hearth Money Rolls compiled on 29 September 1663 there were two Hearth Tax payers in Dromany- Brian O Shenan and Tirlagh Marton.

In the Cavan Poll Book of 1761, there was one person registered to vote in Drummany in the Irish general election, 1761 - Robert Fairis. He was entitled to cast two votes. The four election candidates were Charles Coote, 1st Earl of Bellomont and Lord Newtownbutler (later Brinsley Butler, 2nd Earl of Lanesborough), both of whom were then elected Member of Parliament for Cavan County. The losing candidates were George Montgomery (MP) of Ballyconnell and Barry Maxwell, 1st Earl of Farnham. Absence from the poll book either meant a resident did not vote or more likely was not a freeholder entitled to vote, which would mean most of the inhabitants of Drummany.

The 1790 Cavan Carvaghs list spells the townland name as Dromanny Groves.

Ambrose Leet's 1814 Directory spells the name as Dromany.

The 1825 Tithe Applotment Books list twelve tithepayers in the townland.

The Drummany Valuation Office books are available for April 1838.

Griffith's Valuation of 1857 lists ten landholders in the townland.

The landlord of Drummany in the 19th century was William Cook.

== Census ==
Year	Population	Males	Females	Total Houses	Uninhabited
1841	183	88	95	36	1
1851	54	26	28	10	0
1861	58	29	29	10	0
1871	54	27	27	10	0
1881	60	27	33	12	1
1891	66	38	28	10	0

In the 1901 census of Ireland, there were nine families listed in the townland.

In the 1911 census of Ireland, there were twelve families listed in the townland.

== Antiquities ==
1. Drummany hedge-school. The Second Report of the Commissioners of Irish Education Inquiry of 1826 states that Hugh Finnegan, a Roman Catholic, ran a pay school in Drummany in a clay building valued at £6, for 25 boys and 16 girls. Two thirds of the pupils were Catholic and one third were Protestant. The teacher’s pay was £10 per annum.
2. Drummany Parochial Hall
