= Evlagh Beg =

Townlad in County Cavan, Ireland

- Townland
- Interactive map of Evlagh Beg
- Coordinates: 54°02′46″N 7°36′00″W
- Country: Ireland

Evlagh Beg (Irish derived place name, Aibhleach Beag meaning 'The Small Place of Fires' (possibly from lime-burning).) is a townland in the civil parish of Kildallan, barony of Tullyhunco, County Cavan, Ireland.

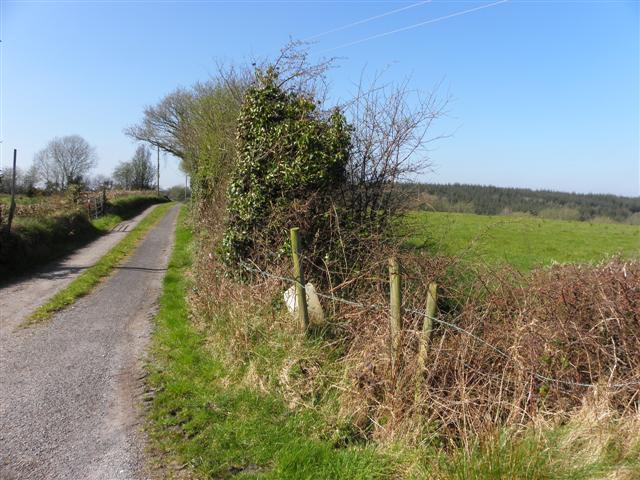
Lane, Evlagh Beg (geograph 2870377)

== Geography ==
Evlagh Beg is bounded on the west by Greaghacholea townland, on the east by Evlagh More townland, on the south by Drumlarah and Killygorman townlands and on the north by Cornacrum and Mullaghmore, Tullyhunco townlands. Its chief geographical features are small streams, a quarry, a spring well and forestry plantations. Evlagh Beg is traversed by minor public roads and rural lanes. The townland covers 166 acres.

== History ==
The 1609 Plantation of Ulster Baronial map depicts the townland as Eyulagh. A Plantation of Ulster grant dated 1611 spells the name as Evelagh. The 1641 Depositions spell the name as Leuella.

From medieval times up to the early 1600s, the land belonged to the McKiernan Clan.

In the Plantation of Ulster by grant dated 16 August 1611, King James VI and I granted, inter alia, Evelagh to Thomas Jones-Evelagh to Thomas Johnes, gentleman. At Cavan, on 26 July 1642, the aforesaid Thomas Jones and his son William Jones gave the names of rebel leaders in the Cavan Irish Rebellion of 1641, including, inter alia, Laighlen mac Torlough McKernan of Leuella, James mac Laighlen McKernan of same and Hugh mac Laighlen McKernan of same. They also stated- The Complaynt of William Jones gent. and Tho: Jones, his father, of Cornecrom in the County of Cavan, gent. sayth sworne & examined saith that on the seavententh of November last 1641 there came unto the habitacion of the deponent William Jones, [Weny] Sheridan of Molloughmore, Ffarrell mac Donell mac Ffarrell Oge McKernan of Aighavenaigh, Donell Oge McKernan of same and their nephew, which was freehoulders of the foresaid Aighavenaigh and violently with other assistants tooke away from the complayneant William Jones, fiftye English cowes price 125 li. ster, ten heffers 20 li. ster, eight yeare-olds 4 li. ster, five horsses and mares 10 li. ster, in corne & hay 40 li sterling, in apparell and househould stuffe 30 li. ster, all which sume amountinge to were worth 229 li. ster and sayd when they tooke away the foresaid goods that the said William Jones, the Complayneant, was a traytor and bade him goe for his Country England & further sayth mee And further theis deponents say that the parties mencioned in a note or scedule hereunto annexed are or were lately actors in the present Rebellion & bore and carryed armes with and for the Rebells against the Protestants whom they robbed and dispoyled of their goodes & did other outrages are theis vizt Tho: Jones Will: Jones Deposed July 26, 1642. In a further deposition dated 26 July 1642, the said Thomas Jones of Drumminnion, Kildallan parish stated- that on the 17th of November 1641 the deponent Thomas Jones by the procurement of Phillip mac Hugh mac Shane Rely, Edmond Rely, Hugh mac Shane mac Phillip Rely and Hugh mac Molmore Rely, was robbed by Patt Sheridan of Rillaigh, Donell Oge McKernan and his nephew heire of Aighaveny, Laighlen Oge O'Rorke de Killnemarue and Bryan O'Rorke of the same, of the goods following, viz. eightene melch Cowes price 36 li. ster, six heffers in calfe, six pownds sterling; three yearelings 30 s. sterling, foure horsses 12 li. sterling, Corne & hay price 4 0li. sterling, in ready mony x li. 10 s. sterling, in househould stuffe as plate pewter brasse, lynen wollen beddinge and apparell with other necessaries 40 li. sterling, in proffitts of lands per annum in the said County 16 li. sterling,.

In the Hearth Money Rolls compiled on 29 September 1663 there was one Hearth Tax payer in Eulaghbegg- Brian McKernan.

In the Cavan Poll Book of 1761, there were two people registered to vote in Evelagh Beg in the 1761 Irish general election - Alexander Faires and David Fairis. Each was entitled to cast two votes. The four election candidates were Charles Coote, 1st Earl of Bellomont and Lord Newtownbutler (later Brinsley Butler, 2nd Earl of Lanesborough), both of whom were then elected Member of Parliament for Cavan County. The losing candidates were George Montgomery (MP) of Ballyconnell and Barry Maxwell, 1st Earl of Farnham. Absence from the poll book either meant a resident did not vote or more likely was not a freeholder entitled to vote, which would mean most of the inhabitants of Evlagh Beg.

The townland formed part of the Farnham estate in the 19th century. The estate papers are now in the National Library of Ireland and those papers mentioning Evlagh Beg are at reference 21. F. 118/40 and 21. F. 118/41.

The 1790 Cavan Carvaghs list spells the name as Eulagh-beg.

Ambrose Leet's 1814 Directory spells the name as Evlagh.

In the 1825 Registry of Freeholders for County Cavan there was one freeholder registered in Evelagh-beg: Thomas Crawford. He was a Forty-shilling freeholders holding a lease for lives from his landlord, Lord Farnham.

The Tithe Applotment Books 1823-1837 list four tithepayers in the townland.

The 1836 Ordnance Survey Namebooks state- The soil is good intermixed with limestone which is burned and sold in Killyshandra at 10d per barrell.

The Evlagh Beg Valuation Office books are available for May 1838.

Griffith's Valuation of 1857 lists twelve landholders in the townland.

== Census ==
Year	Population	Males	Females	Total Houses	Uninhabited
1841	46	20	26	8	0
1851	35	15	20	5	0
1861	24	12	12	4	0
1871	26	12	14	5	0
1881	22	8	14	5	0
1891	20	8	12	4	0

In the 1901 census of Ireland, there were six families listed in the townland.

In the 1911 census of Ireland, there were four families listed in the townland.

== Antiquities ==
1. A lime kiln
