= Drumlarah =

Townland in County Cavan, Ireland

Drumlarah (Irish derived place name, either Droim Leath Rátha meaning 'The Hill-Ridge of the Half-Fort' or Droim Láthrach meaning 'The Hill-Ridge of the House-Site' or Droim Lárach meaning 'The Hill-Ridge of the Mare'.) is a townland in the civil parish of Kildallan, barony of Tullyhunco, County Cavan, Ireland.

== Geography ==
Drumlarah is bounded on the west by Evlagh Beg and Killygorman townlands, on the east by Aghnacreevy and Mullaghdoo, Cavan townlands, on the south by Drummany and Tonaloy townlands and on the north by Evlagh More townland. Its chief geographical features are small streams, forestry plantations and spring wells. Drumlarah is traversed by the regional R199 road (Ireland), minor public roads and rural lanes. The townland covers 193 acres,.

== History ==
The Ulster Plantation Baronial map of 1609 depicts the name as Dromlara. The Ulster Plantation grants of 1611 spell the townland name as Dromlare. A 1615 lease spells the name as Dromlara. A 1629 inquisition spells the name as Dromlara. A 1631 grant spells the name as Dromlara. The 1641 Depositions spell it as Dromlara. The 1652 Commonwealth Survey spells the townland as Dromlara. The locals currently pronounce the name as Drum-law-rah.

From medieval times up to the early 1600s, the land belonged to the McKiernan Clan. In the Plantation of Ulster in 1609 the lands of the McKiernans were confiscated, but some were later regranted to them. In the Plantation of Ulster grant dated 4 June 1611, King James VI and I granted 400 acres (160 hectares) or 7 poles (a poll is the local name for townland) of land in Tullyhunco at an annual rent of £4 5s. 4d., to Bryan McKearnan, gentleman, comprising the modern-day townlands of Clontygrigny, Cornacrum, Cornahaia, Derrinlester, Dring, Drumlarah, Ardlougher and Kiltynaskellan. Under the terms of the grant, McKearnan was obliged to build a house on this land. The said Brian 'Bán' Mág Tighearnán (anglicized 'Blonde' Brian McKiernan) was chief of the McKiernan Clan of Tullyhunco, County Cavan, Ireland from 1588 until his death on 4 September 1622. In a visitation by George Carew, 1st Earl of Totnes in autumn 1611, it was recorded, McKyernan removed to his proportion and is about building a house. On 23 March 1615, Mág Tighearnán granted a lease on these lands to James Craig. On 14 March 1630, an Inquisition of King Charles I of England held in Cavan Town stated that Brian bane McKiernan died on 4 September 1622, and his lands comprising seven poles and three pottles in Clonkeen, Clontygrigny, Cornacrum, Derrinlester, Dring, Killygorman, Kiltynaskellan and Mullaghdoo went to his nearest relatives. The most likely inheritors being Cahill, son of Owen McKiernan; Brian, son of Turlough McKiernan and Farrell, son of Phelim McKiernan, all aged over 21 and married. On 26 April 1631 a re-grant was made to Sir James Craige, which included the lands of Dromlara, which also included sub-divisions in the townland called Mullaghdowleghen, Aghamullen, Drumlaremeen, Dromlarregarro and Gurtincorleagh. Sir James Craig died in the siege of Croaghan Castle on 8 April 1642. His land was inherited by his brother John Craig of Craig Castle, County Cavan and of Craigston, County Leitrim, who was chief doctor to King James I and Charles I.

At Cavan, on 26 July 1642, Thomas and William Jones gave the names of rebel leaders in the Cavan Irish Rebellion of 1641, including Donell Rely of Dromlara.

After the Irish Rebellion of 1641 concluded, the rebels vacated the land and the 1652 Commonwealth Survey lists the townland as belonging to Lewis Craig. Lord John Carmichael (b.1710 - d.1787), the 4th Earl of Hyndford of Castle Craig, County Cavan, inherited the lands from the Craig estate.

The 1790 Cavan Carvaghs list spells the townland name as Drumlara.

The Tithe Applotment Books for 1827 list fourteen tithepayers in the townland.

The Drumlarah Valuation Office books are available for April 1838.

Griffith's Valuation of 1857 lists seven landholders in the townland.

The 1930s Dúchas folklore collection states- Sir Ralph Cusack (b. 1820 – d. 1911) was landlord over the townlands of Drumlara (then written Drumlaragh), Aughnacreevy and Relliaugh. He was looked upon as being a good landlord. On one occasion he invited his tenants to Dublin to spend a day and a night in the city. He gave them a good time and bore all expenses. He also encouraged them to improve their land by paying them for draining it in the winter time. His agent, a Mr Faris, Corr, Killeshandra, inspected and reported on the work. To those who wished to raise their house and slate them he allowed half the cost. The aforesaid collection also includes some folk traditions from Drumlarah in the 1930s.

== Census ==
Year	Population	Males	Females	Total Houses	Uninhabited
1841	82	39	43	15	0
1851	44	21	23	7	0
1861	60	28	32	10	0
1871	48	20	28	8	0
1881	40	20	20	8	1
1891	31	18	13	7	0

In the 1901 census of Ireland, there were five families listed in the townland.

In the 1911 census of Ireland, there were eight families listed in the townland.

== Antiquities ==
1. Drumlarah 19th century school
2. A lime kiln
