= Drumminnion =

Townland in County Cavan, Ireland

Drumminnion (Irish derived place name, Droim Mionnáin meaning 'The Hill-Ridge of the Kid-Goat') is a townland in the civil parish of Kildallan, barony of Tullyhunco, County Cavan, Ireland.

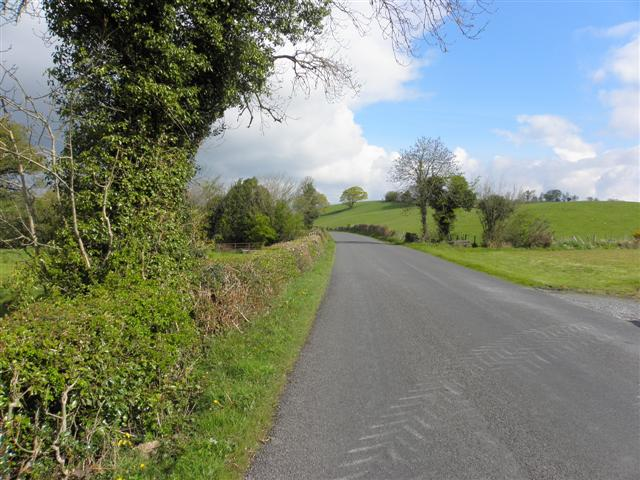
Road at Drumminnion (geograph 2914392)

== Geography ==
Drumminnion is bounded on the west by Cornacrum and Evlagh More townlands, on the east by Clonkeen and Mackan townlands, on the south by Aghnacreevy townland and on the north by Dring townland. Its chief geographical features are the Rag River, small streams and spring wells. Drumminnion is traversed by minor public roads and rural lanes. The townland covers 124 acres.

== History ==
The 1609 Plantation of Ulster Baronial map depicts the townland as Drominon. Plantation of Ulster grants dated 1611 spell the name as Drominon and Dromynan. A 1629 Inquisition spells the name as Dromyna. The 1641 Depositions spell the name as Drominan. The 1652 Commonwealth Survey spells the name as Drominone.

From medieval times up to the early 1600s, the land belonged to the McKiernan Clan.

In the Plantation of Ulster by grant dated 16 August 1611, King James VI and I granted, inter alia, part of Drumminion to Thomas Jones-10/12 of the poll of Drominon to Thomas Johnes, gentleman. On 27 June 1610, the king granted the remaining 2/12 parts of the poll of Dromynan to John Achmootie, a Scottish Groom of the Bedchamber. His brother Alexander Achmootie was granted the neighbouring Manor of Dromheada. On 16 August 1610 John Aghmootie sold his lands in Tullyhunco to James Craig. On 1 May 1611 James Craig leased, inter alia, 1/4 poll of Dromynan to Corhonogho McKernan. An Inquisition held at Ballyconnell on 2 November 1629 stated that the 1/4 poll of Dromyna contained two sub-divisions named Mahernagh and Tawnemeadan.

On 26 July 1642, Thomas Jones of Drumminnion and his son William of Cornacrum made the following deposition about the Irish Rebellion of 1641- Thomas Jones of Drominan in the Countie of Cavan gentleman gent & William Jones of Cornedrum his sonne in the same Countie The Complaynt of Thomas Jones of Dromynen in the County of Cavan gent adged three score and odd sworne & examined sayth that on the 17th of Nouember 1641 the deponent Thomas Jones By the procurement of Phillip mc Hugh mc Shane Rely, Edmond Rely, Hugh mc Shane mc Phillip Rely and Hugh mc Molmore Rely, he this deponent was robbed by Patt Sheridan of Rillaigh, Donell oge mc Kernan and his nephew heire of Aighaveny, Laighlen oge O'Rorke of Killnemarue and Bryan O'Rorke of the same, of those goods following, viz. eightene melch Cowes price £36 sterling, six heffers in calfe six pownds sterling; three yearelings 30 s. sterling, foure horsses £12 sterling, Corne & hay price £40 sterling, in ready mony £10. 10 s. sterling, in househould stuffe as plate pewter, brasse, lynen, wollen beddinge and apparell with other necessaries £40 sterling, in proffitts of in lands per annum in the said County £16 sterling, And in the county of Killdare by lease £20 sterling per annum, all which some amountinge to £182 sterling. the Complaynant is damnified by the Rebells & must loose the future proffitts of the land & farme until a peace be established. And badd him be gone like a traytor out of the kingdome for he should not stay amongst them.

In the 1652 Commonwealth Survey the lands were owned by William James.

In the Cavan Poll Book of 1761, there were four people registered to vote in Drumminnion in the Irish general election, 1761 - Aungier Dobbs, Francis Little, Thomas Little and William Little. They were each entitled to cast two votes. The four election candidates were Charles Coote, 1st Earl of Bellomont and Lord Newtownbutler (later Brinsley Butler, 2nd Earl of Lanesborough), both of whom were then elected Member of Parliament for Cavan County. The losing candidates were George Montgomery (MP) of Ballyconnell and Barry Maxwell, 1st Earl of Farnham. Absence from the poll book either meant a resident did not vote or more likely was not a freeholder entitled to vote, which would mean most of the inhabitants of Drumminnion.

The townland formed part of the Farnham estate in the 19th century. The estate papers are now in the National Library of Ireland and those papers mentioning Drumminnion are at reference MS 41,131 /13 and 21. F. 118/26.

The 1790 Cavan Carvaghs list spells the name as Drominion.

The Tithe Applotment Books 1823-1837 list eight tithepayers in the townland.

The Drumminnion Valuation Office books are available for 1838.

Griffith's Valuation of 1857 lists six landholders in the townland.

== Census ==
Year	Population	Males	Females	Total Houses	Uninhabited
1841	38	19	19	9	1
1851	36	20	16	6	0
1861	43	25	18	6	0
1871	21	12	9	5	0
1881	25	13	12	5	0
1891	14	10	4	6	3

In the 1901 census of Ireland, there were four families listed in the townland.

In the 1911 census of Ireland, there were three families listed in the townland.
