= Mullaghdoo, Cavan =

Townland in County Cavan, Ireland

Mullaghdoo (Irish derived place name, Mullach Dubh meaning 'The Black Summit') is a townland in the civil parish of Kildallan, barony of Tullyhunco, County Cavan, Ireland.

== Geography ==
Mullaghdoo is bounded on the west by Drumlarah and Drummany townlands, on the east by Drumbinnis, Drumgoohy and Mackan townlands, on the south by Makief townland and on the north by Aghnacreevy townland. Its chief geographical features are Mullaghdoo Hill which rises to 334 feet, Mullaghdoo Lough, small streams and spring wells. Mullaghdoo is traversed by the regional R199 road (Ireland), minor public roads and rural lanes. The townland covers 272 acres.

== History ==
The Ulster Plantation Baronial map of 1609 depicts the name as Mollaghdoue. A 1610 grant spells it as Molaghdone. A 1611 lease spells it as Nullaghdow. A 1630 inquisition spells the name as Mullaghduffe. The 1641 Depositions spell the name as Mullaighduffe. The 1652 Commonwealth Survey spells the townland as Mullaghduffe.

From medieval times up to the early 1600s, the land belonged to the McKiernan Clan. In the Plantation of Ulster in 1609 the lands of the McKiernans were confiscated, but some were later regranted to them. In the Plantation of Ulster King James VI and I by grant dated 27 June 1610, granted the Manor of Keylagh, which included one poll in Molaghdone, to John Achmootie, a Scottish Groom of the Bedchamber. His brother Alexander Achmootie was granted the neighbouring Manor of Dromheada. On 29 July 1611 Arthur Chichester, 1st Baron Chichester and others reported that John Auchmothy and Alexander Auchmothye have not appeared at the lands awarded to them. James Craige is their deputy for five years, who has brought 4 artificers of divers sorts with their wives and families and 2 other servants. Stone raised for building a mill and trees felled, a walled house with a smith's forge built, 4 horses and mares upon the grounds with competent arms. On 1 May 1611 the aforesaid James Craig leased, inter alia, 1 poll of Nullaghdow to Corhonogho McKernan. Corhonogho McKernan must have sold his leasehold interest to his chief Brian McKiernan as on 14 March 1630, an Inquisition of King Charles I of England held in Cavan Town stated that Brian bane McKiernan (Brian Bán Mág Tighearnán, the chief of the McKiernan clan from 1588 to 1622) died on September 4, 1622, and his lands (probably a leasehold rather than the freehold) comprising seven poles and three pottles in Clonkeen, Clontygrigny, Cornacrum, Derrinlester, Dring, Killygorman, Kiltynaskellan and Mullaghdoo, Cavan went to his nearest relatives. The most likely inheritors being Cahill, son of Owen McKiernan; Brian, son of Turlough McKiernan and Farrell, son of Phelim McKiernan, all aged over 21 and married. In the Irish Rebellion of 1641 the rebels occupied the townland. In the 1641 Rebellion Depositions for County Cavan, Thomas Jones of Drumminnion townland and his son William Jones gave the names of rebel leaders in the Cavan Irish Rebellion of 1641, including, Farrell Og McKiernan of Mullaighduffe, Turlogh McFarrell McKiernan of same, Owen McFarrell McKiernan of same, Patrick McIlmartin of same and Hugh McIlmartin of same. Sir James Craig died in the siege of Croaghan Castle on 8 April 1642. His land was inherited by his brother John Craig of Craig Castle, County Cavan and of Craigston, County Leitrim, who was chief doctor to both King James I and Charles I.

After the Irish Rebellion of 1641 concluded, the rebels vacated the land and the 1652 Commonwealth Survey lists the townland as belonging to Lewis Craig. In the Hearth Money Rolls compiled on 29 September 1663 there were two Hearth Tax payers in Mullaghdufe- Brian McKernan and Derby Clancy.

The 1790 Cavan Carvaghs list spells the townland name as Mullaghduff.

In the 19th century the townland belonged to the Farnham Estate of Cavan. The estate papers are now in the National Library of Ireland and those papers mentioning Mullaghdoo are at reference numbers 21. F. 118/43; 21. F. 118/44 and 21. F. 118/45.

In the 1825 Registry of Freeholders for County Cavan there was one freeholder registered in Mulladuff: Edward Martin. He was a Forty-shilling freeholders holding a lease for lives from his landlord, James S. Fleming.

The Tithe Applotment Books for 1827 list nine tithepayers in the townland.

The Mullaghdoo Valuation Office books are available for April 1838.

Griffith's Valuation of 1857 lists ten landholders in the townland.

== Census ==
Year	Population	Males	Females	Total Houses	Uninhabited
1841	69	32	37	13	1
1851	52	24	28	10	2
1861	46	22	24	9	0
1871	51	23	28	10	1
1881	46	22	24	10	0
1891	29	12	17	9	1

In the 1901 census of Ireland, there were nine families listed in the townland.

In the 1911 census of Ireland, there were eight families listed in the townland.
