= Greaghacholea =

Townland in County Cavan, Ireland

Greaghacholea (Irish derived place name, Gréach an Chuaille meaning 'The Moorland of the Tall Leafless Tree'.) is a townland in the civil parish of Kildallan, barony of Tullyhunco, County Cavan, Ireland. The townland is also known as Coraghmuck (Irish derived place name, Currach Muc meaning The Moorland of the Pigs).

== Geography ==
Greaghacholea is bounded on the west by Doogary and Tullynabeherny townlands, on the east by Evlagh Beg townland, on the south by Killygorman townland and on the north by Kiltynaskellan and Mullaghmore, Tullyhunco townlands. Its chief geographical features are small streams, forestry plantations, a dug well and spring wells. Greaghacholea is traversed by minor public roads and rural lanes. The townland covers 279 acres.

== History ==
The Ulster Plantation Baronial map of 1609 depicts the name as Corraghtmoght. The Ulster Plantation grants of 1611 spell the townland name as Caraghtmoght. The 1652 Commonwealth Survey spells the townland as Curraghtmoght.

From medieval times up to the early 1600s, the land belonged to the McKiernan Clan. About the year 1600 it was owned by Thomas McKiernan, along with the townlands of Doogary, Killarah and Ned, Tullyhunco, all in Tullyhunco Barony. He sold the land c.1606 to Richard Tyrrell of Tyrrellspass, County Westmeath. A schedule, dated 31 July 1610, of the lands Tyrrell owned in Tullyhunco prior to the Ulster Plantation included: Corromeach, one cartron (a cartron was about 30 acres of arable land). In the Plantation of Ulster, Tyrrell swapped his lands in Greaghacholea for additional land in the barony of Tullygarvey where he lived at the time. Thomas McKiernan died sometime before 1611 and his lands were inherited by his son Owen McKiernan. Owen was worried that his lands would be confiscated under the Plantation of Ulster so he made representations to the Lords of the Council in Whitehall, London. They in turn sent the following note to Arthur Chichester, 1st Baron Chichester, the Lord Deputy of Ireland- April 30, 1610. Recommend to his favourable consideration in the settlement of the natives, the bearer, Owen Carnan, who sued for 800 acres of land lying in the county of Cavan, which have belonged (as he informs them) to his father, uncle, & others his predecessors, time out of mind, without any attainder for matter of disloyalty. Owen McKiernan was only partly successful in his claim as in the Plantation of Ulster, by grant dated 4 June 1611, King James VI and I granted 100 acres or 2 poles (a poll is the local name for townland) of land in Tullyhunco at an annual rent of £1 1s. 4d., to Wony McThomas McKernan, comprising the modern-day townlands of Ned, Doogary and Greaghacholea.

After the Irish Rebellion of 1641 concluded, the townland was confiscated in the Cromwellian Settlement and the 1652 Commonwealth Survey lists it as belonging to William Madders & others, who were also listed as owners of the adjoining townland of Mullaghmore. The townland was later acquired by the Earl Annesley estate which held it up to the end of the 19th century. The Annesley estate papers spell the name as Greaghahollea.

The 1790 Cavan Carvaghs list spells the name as Coramught.

In the 1825 Registry of Freeholders for County Cavan there was one freeholder registered in Greaghnahola- James Brady of Corenea. He was a Forty-shilling freeholders holding the Fee simple himself, worth £20.

The Tithe Applotment Books 1823-1837 list fifteen tithepayers in the townland.

The Greaghacholea Valuation Office books are available for May 1838.

Griffith's Valuation of 1857 lists thirteen landholders in the townland.

== Census ==
Year	Population	Males	Females	Total Houses	Uninhabited
1841	102	55	47	16	0
1851	74	39	35	12	0
1861	61	30	31	12	0
1871	52	29	23	9	0
1881	57	33	24	9	0
1891	34	17	17	8	0

In the 1901 census of Ireland, there were eight families listed in the townland.

In the 1911 census of Ireland, there were nine families listed in the townland.

== Antiquities ==
1. Lime-kilns
