= Ragi =

Ragi may refer to:

- Finger millet, plant producing edible grain
- Ragi (Sikhism), a Sikh person skilled in performing ragas
- Saccharomyces cerevisiae, a yeast also known as ragi yeast

== See also ==
- Raga (disambiguation)
- Rag (disambiguation)
- Ragee
