= Ragman =

Ragman may refer to:

- a rag-and-bone man, a junkdealer
- Ragman (character), a fictional DC Comics mystic vigilante
- The Ragman's Daughter, a 1972 film
- The Ragman's Son, the first autobiography by actor Kirk Douglas
- Ragman Rolls, the collection of instruments by which the nobility and gentry of Scotland subscribed allegiance to King Edward I of England
- Răgman village, Poiana Câmpina Commune, Prahova County, Romania

== See also ==
- Rag (disambiguation)
