= Callaghs =

Townland in County Cavan, Ireland

Callaghs (Irish derived place name, either Calaí, meaning 'The River Meadows', or Cealldrach, meaning 'An Old Burial Place') is a townland in the civil parish of Kildallan, barony of Tullyhunco, County Cavan, Ireland. The locals pronounce the name as The Callas.

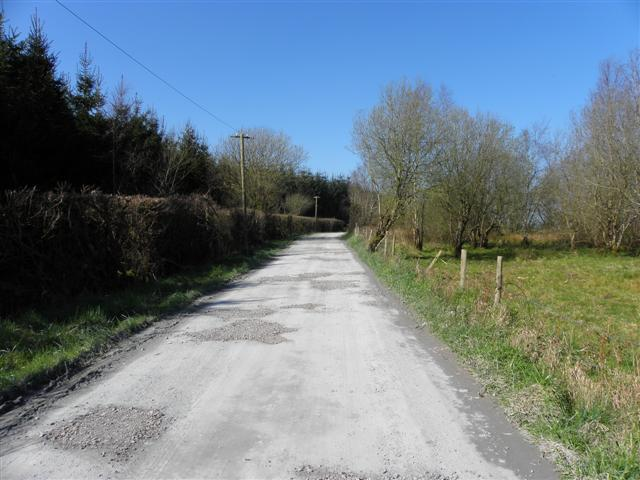
Road at Callaghs (geograph 2870417)

== Geography ==
Callaghs is bounded on the east by Clontygrigny and Mullaghmore, Tullyhunco townlands, on the west by Coologe and Kiltynaskellan townlands and on the north by Killarah townland. Its chief geographical features are the Shannon-Erne Waterway, Dumb Lough, small streams, quarries, sandpits, dug wells and forestry plantations. Callaghs is traversed by minor public roads and rural lanes. The townland covers 336 acres, including 2 acres of water.

== History ==
From medieval times up to the early 1600s, the land belonged to the McKiernan Clan. Until the 18th century, Callaghs formed part of the townland of Aghaweenagh and its history is the same until then. From the 18th century, Callaghs formed part of the Thornton estate of Greenville, County Cavan. The estate papers are held by the Cavan County Archive Service, and those papers mentioning Callaghs are at reference numbers P016/005; P016/016 and P016/018.

The 1790 Cavan Carvaghs list spells the name as Caldragh.

Ambrose Leet's 1814 Directory spells the name as Callaghs.

The 1825 Tithe Applotment Books list three tithepayers in the townland.

The Callaghs Valuation Office books are available for May 1838.

Griffith's Valuation of 1857 lists ten landholders in the townland.

In 1863 Callaghs was sold by the Thornton Estate to Lord Charles Beresford. On 5 July 1870 Beresford sold the townland. Callaghs was described in the sale advert as- LOT No. 1. This Lot comprises the Townland of Callaghs held in fee containing 335 acres and 37 perches statute measure. The Lands are mostly arable and pasture. On this Lot are very valuable Turf Bogs in occupation of owner. The County road from Carrigallen to Ballyconnell Intersects these lands.

== Census ==
Year	Population	Males	Females	Total Houses	Uninhabited
1841	38	15	23	7	0
1851	48	22	26	7	0
1861	40	19	21	6	0
1871	36	14	22	6	0
1881	29	12	17	6	2
1891	25	10	15	6	1

In the 1901 census of Ireland, there are five families listed in the townland.

In the 1911 census of Ireland, there are eight families listed in the townland.

== Antiquities ==
1. A lime kiln
