= Ragam (disambiguation) =

Ragam, or raga, is a melodic framework for musical improvisation.

Ragam may also refer to:

- Ragam (surname), including a list of people with the name
- Ragam (festival), an annual cultural festival hosted by the National Institute of Technology Calicut

== See also ==
- Raga (disambiguation)
- Mouna Ragam (disambiguation)
