= Mouna Ragam (disambiguation) =

Mouna Ragam is a 1986 Indian film.

Mouna Ragam (alternatively Mounaragam, Mounaraagam or Mouna Raagam; transl. Silent Symphony) may also refer to these in Indian entertainment:

- Mouna Ragam (soundtrack), of the 1986 film
- Mouna Raagam (Tamil TV series), a 2017 Tamil TV series
- Mounaraagam (Telugu TV series), a 2018 Telugu TV series
- Mounaragam (Malayalam TV series), a 2019 Malayalam TV series
- Mouna Raagam 2, a 2021 Tamil TV series

== See also ==
- Maun (disambiguation)
- Mauna (disambiguation)
- Ragam (disambiguation)
