= Mackan =

Townland in County Cavan, Ireland

Mackan (Irish derived place name, Meacan meaning 'The Field of Carrots'.) is a townland in the civil parish of Kildallan, barony of Tullyhunco, County Cavan, Ireland.

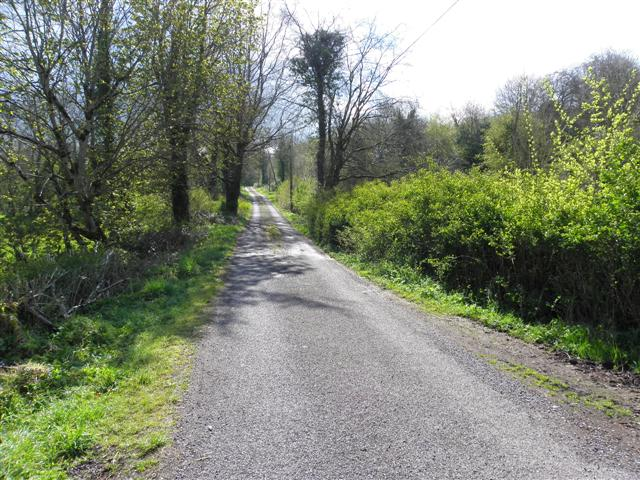
Road at Mackan (geograph 2915438)

== Geography ==
Mackan is bounded on the north by Clonkeen and Drumminnion townlands, on the west by Aghnacreevy townland, on the south by Drumbinnis and Mullaghdoo, Cavan townlands and on the east by Keilagh townland. Its chief geographical features are Mullaghdoo Lough, a fish pond, small streams, spring wells and a wood. Mackan is traversed by minor public roads and rural lanes. The townland covers 179 acres.

== History ==
From medieval times up to the early 1600s, the land belonged to the McKiernan Clan.

The 1609 Plantation of Ulster Map depicts the townland as Mackan. A grant of 1610 spells the name as Markan. A lease of 1611 spells the name as Mockane. An inquisition of 1629 spells the name as Mackan. The 1652 Commonwealth Survey spells it as Macken.

In the Plantation of Ulster King James VI and I by grant dated 27 June 1610, granted the Manor of Keylagh, which included one poll in Markan, to John Achmootie, a Scottish Groom of the Bedchamber. His brother Alexander Achmootie was granted the neighbouring Manor of Dromheada. On 16 August 1610 John Aghmootie sold his lands in Tullyhunco to James Craig. On 1 May 1611 James Craig leased, inter alia, 1 poll of Mockane to Corhonogho McKernan. On 29 July 1611 Arthur Chichester, 1st Baron Chichester and others reported that John Auchmothy and Alexander Auchmothye have not appeared at the lands awarded to them. James Craige is their deputy for five years, who has brought 4 artificers of divers sorts with their wives and families and 2 other servants. Stone raised for building a mill and trees felled, a walled house with a smith's forge built, 4 horses and mares upon the grounds with competent arms. An Inquisition held at Ballyconnell on 2 November 1629 stated that the poll of Mackan contained fifteen sub-divisions named Mullaghbog, Knockne, Gartinrin, Tonelagh, Cappagh, Townevalley, Agh, Shanevallendarragh, Corragh, Knockenea, Knocketalgar, Aghnahowle, Garfadagh, Aghen and Gortinboy. Sir James Craig died in the siege of Croaghan Castle on 8 April 1642. His land was inherited by his brother John Craig of Craig Castle, County Cavan and of Craigston, County Leitrim, who was chief doctor to both King James I and Charles I. The 1652 Commonwealth Survey states the owner was Lady Craig.

In the Hearth Money Rolls compiled on 29 September 1663 there were two Hearth Tax payers in Maken- James Ferrish and William Sharpe.

The will of John Faris of Mackan, County Cavan dated 1 November 1745 was probated on 31 January 1745. (Betham Genealogical Abstracts)

Marriage settlements dated 7 March 1750 and 11 July 1760 relates to the Faris family with lands in Mackan etc.

The 1790 Cavan Carvaghs list spells the townland name as Makeene.

Ambrose Leet's 1814 Directory spells the name as Mackin.

In the 1825 Registry of Freeholders for County Cavan there were two freeholders registered in Mackin- Patt Smythe and William Wiggans. They were both Forty-shilling freeholders, Smythe holding a lease for lives from his landlord, George Faris and Wiggans holding a lease for lives from his landlord, William Faris.

The 1825 Tithe Applotment Books list five tithepayers in the townland.

In the early 1800s a Sunday school was kept in the townland, funded by the Hibernian Sunday School Society. In October 1819 it had an attendance of 34 scholars.

The Mackan Valuation Office Field books are available for 1838.

On 13 November 1851 the following decision was made by the Incumbered Estates Court- The Chief Commissioner sat in the Court, Henrietta-street, Dublin, to-day, for the purpose of selling incumbered property. In the matter of the estates of Williams James Thomas GALBRAITH, owner. Ex parte Morgan CROFTON, petitioner. Lot 1, the house and demesne of Macken, and Drumbinnis, Keilagh, Druminisdill, Drumcartagh, and Drumcannon, county of Cavan, containing £74. 0r. 15p. state measure, held in fee farm, producing a gross annual rental of £484, 11s, 10d., subject to two fee farm rents, one of £131, 18s. 6d., and the other of £62, 6s. 2d. The biddings proceeded from £4000 to £5390, at which sum Mrs. Elizabeth GALBRAITH became the purchaser. Lot 2, the fee simple lands of EVLAGHMORE, containing 140s. 1. 39p. statute measure, and producing an annual rental of £76, 11s, 8d. The first offer was £700., and Mr. W. Galbraith (the owner) was the purchaser for £1000.

Griffith's Valuation of 1857 lists ten landholders in the townland.

The landlord of Mackan in the 19th century was Captain John Johnston.

== Census ==
Year	Population	Males	Females	Total Houses	Uninhabited
1841	42	22	20	6	0
1851	35	16	19	5	0
1861	46	24	22	7	0
1871	41	26	15	7	0
1881	30	19	11	5	0
1891	25	15	10	5	0

In the 1901 census of Ireland, there were five families listed in the townland.

In the 1911 census of Ireland, there were seven families listed in the townland.

== Antiquities ==
1. Mackan House
