= Tonaloy =

Townland in County Cavan, Ireland

Tonaloy (Irish derived place name, Tóin na Láí meaning 'The Low-Lying Meadow of the Spades'.) is a townland in the civil parish of Kildallan, barony of Tullyhunco, County Cavan, Ireland.

== Etymology ==
The townland name derives from the marshy ground along the Laheen river at the southern boundary. An 1853 Report from the Board of Public Works, Ireland states- The improvement of the Laheen River has been completed up to the limit of the district at Longfield Bridge, and one stone accommodation bridge, and two wooden passes erected across the cut; a branch stream from Tonaloy Marsh has also been deepened, and a gullet built across it on the public road at Drumcrow.

== Geography ==
Tonaloy is bounded on the north by Killygorman townland, on the west by Cornahaia and Derrinlester townlands, on the south by Laheen townland and on the east by Drumcrow North, Drumlarah and Drummany townlands. Its chief geographical features are Tonaloy Hill which reaches to 313 feet, the Laheen River, small streams, a quarry, spring wells and forestry plantations. Tonaloy is traversed by minor public roads and rural lanes. The townland covers 326 acres.

== History ==
From medieval times up to the early 1600s, the land belonged to the McKiernan Clan. The 1609 Plantation of Ulster Map depicts the townland as Tonsloy. A grant of 1610 spells the name as Tonyley. A lease of 1611 spells the name as Toneloy. The 1652 Commonwealth Survey spells it as Tonyloy.

In the Plantation of Ulster King James VI and I by grant dated 27 June 1610, granted the Manor of Keylagh, which included one poll in Tonyley, to John Achmootie, a Scottish Groom of the Bedchamber. His brother Alexander Achmootie was granted the neighbouring Manor of Dromheada. On 16 August 1610 John Aghmootie sold his lands in Tullyhunco to James Craig. On 1 May 1611 James Craig leased, inter alia, 1 poll of Toneloy to Briene bane McKernan. The said Brian Bán Mág Tighearnán was chief of the McKiernan clan from 1588 until his death on 4 September 1622. On 29 July 1611 Arthur Chichester, 1st Baron Chichester and others reported that John Auchmothy and Alexander Auchmothye have not appeared at the lands awarded to them. James Craige is their deputy for five years, who has brought 4 artificers of divers sorts with their wives and families and 2 other servants. Stone raised for building a mill and trees felled, a walled house with a smith's forge built, 4 horses and mares upon the grounds with competent arms. Sir James Craig died in the siege of Croaghan Castle on 8 April 1642. His land was inherited by his brother John Craig of Craig Castle, County Cavan and of Craigston, County Leitrim, who was chief doctor to both King James I and Charles I. The 1652 Commonwealth Survey states the owner was Lewis Craig. In the Hearth Money Rolls compiled on 29 September 1663 there were three Hearth Tax payers in Tonyloy- Walter Taylor, Donell O Mulchoill and Patrick McKeay.

Lord John Carmichael (b.1710 - d.1787), the 4th Earl of Hyndford of Castle Craig, County Cavan, inherited the lands from the Craig estate. In 1758 Carmichael sold the lands to the Farnham Estate of Cavan. The estate papers are now in the National Library of Ireland and those papers mentioning Tonaloy are at reference numbers MS 41,114 /2; MS 41,114 /3; MS 41,114 /4; MS 41,114 /10; MS 41,114 /11; MS 41,114 /12; MS 41,114 /16; MS 41,114 /18; MS 41,114 /19; MS 41,126 /11-12; MS 41,126 /13; MS 41,131 /21; 21. F. 118/52 and 21. F. 118/53.

The 1790 Cavan Carvaghs list spells the townland name as Tonneloy.

In the early 1800s a Sunday school was kept in the townland, funded by the Hibernian Sunday School Society. In October 1820 it had an attendance of 27 scholars.

The 1825 Tithe Applotment Books list fifteen tithepayers in the townland.

The Tonaloy Valuation Office books are available for April 1838.

Griffith's Valuation of 1857 lists seven landholders in the townland.

== Census ==
| Year | Population | Males | Females | Total Houses | Uninhabited |
|---|---|---|---|---|---|
| 1841 | 127 | 65 | 62 | 22 | 2 |
| 1851 | 71 | 33 | 38 | 13 | 0 |
| 1861 | 52 | 22 | 30 | 12 | 0 |
| 1871 | 46 | 25 | 21 | 11 | 1 |
| 1881 | 53 | 28 | 25 | 12 | 0 |
| 1891 | 35 | 18 | 17 | 10 | 1 |

In the 1901 census of Ireland, there were nine families listed in the townland.

In the 1911 census of Ireland, there were ten families listed in the townland.

== Antiquities ==
1. Stepping-stones over the stream
2. A ford over the stream
3. Two foot-bridges over the stream
