= Dring =

Dring may refer to:

- Celeste Dring, English comedy writer and actress
- Clive Dring (born 1934), English cricketer
- Edgar Dring (1896–1955), Australian politician
- Sir John Dring (1902–1991), British colonial administrator, Prime Minister Bahawalpur
- Lawrie Dring (1931–2012), British scouter
- Lilian Dring (1908–1998), British artist
- Madeleine Dring (1923–1977), English composer and actress
- Rawlins Dring (fl.1688), English physician
- Ray Dring (1924–2003), English professional footballer
- Simon Dring (1945–2021), English journalist
- Thomas Dring (died 1668), English publisher and bookseller
- William Dring (1904–1990), English portrait painter
- William Arthur Dring (1859–1912), British Army officer

== Other uses ==
- Dring, County Cavan, a townland in the parish of Kildallan, County Cavan, Ireland
