= Rag =

Rag, rags, RAG or The Rag may refer to:

== Common uses ==
- Rag, a piece of old cloth
- Rags, tattered clothes
- Wash rag
- Rag (newspaper), a publication engaging in tabloid journalism
- Rag paper

== Arts and entertainment ==
=== Film ===
- Rags (1915 film), a silent film
- Rags (2012 film), a modernization of the Cinderella fairy tale

=== Music ===
- Rag, a piece of ragtime music
- Rags (musical), a 1986 Broadway musical
- Ruhrpott AG, a German hip hop group
- Rags, a former name of the band Tin Huey
- Rags (EP), by EarthGang, 2017

=== Other uses in arts and entertainment ===
- Rags (novel), a 2001 Doctor Who novel
- Rags, a dog character in TV show Spin City

== Businesses ==
- RAG AG, a German coal mining corporation
- RAG Austria AG, a gas storage operator in Austria

== People ==
- Rags (nickname), a list of people
- Ēriks Rags (born 1975), Latvian javelin thrower

== Places ==
- Rag Island, Seal Islands group, Australia
- Rag River, County Cavan, Ireland
- Rags Brook, a tributary of the River Lea in England

== Other uses ==
- Royal Galician Academy (Galician: Real Academia Galega), A Coruña, Galicia, Spain, dedicated to the study of Galician culture and language
- The Rag, an underground paper in Austin, Texas, 1966–1977
- Rag (student society), a student-run charitable fundraising group
- Rag (typography), the ragged edge of a block of text
- Recombination-activating gene, encoding enzymes RAG-1 and RAG-2
- RAG rating (Red, Amber, Green), a traffic light rating system
- Rags (dog) (1916–1936), 1st Infantry Division (United States) mascot in World War I
- The Rag (club), alternative name for the Army and Navy Club in London
- RAGS International, later Messiah Foundation International, a spiritual organisation
- Ragioniere or rag., an Italian honorific for a school graduate in business economics
- Retrieval-augmented generation, generative artificial intelligence with the addition of information retrieval capabilities

== See also ==
- Raga (disambiguation) or raag, a melodic framework for improvisation in Indian classical music
- Ragging, hazing in higher education institutions in the Indian subcontinent
