= Maun =

Maun may refer to:

== Places ==
- Maun, Botswana, a town in the North-West District
- River Maun, a river in England
- Maun (island), an island in the Adriatic Sea

== People ==
- Caroline Maun (born 1968), American professor, author, poet, lyricist and musician
- Danny Maun (born 1981), English rugby league player
- Ernie Maun (1901–1987), American Major League Baseball pitcher
- Marsal Maun (1913–2000), second Menteri Besar (Chief Minister of Brunei)

== See also ==
- Ma'un, a chapter of the Quran
- Maun Vrata, term for a vow of silence in India
- Mauna (disambiguation)
- Mouna Ragam (disambiguation)
