= Kiltynaskellan =

Townland in County Cavan, Ireland

Kiltynaskellan (Irish derived place name, Coillte na Sceallán meaning 'The Wood of the Small Acorns'.) is a townland in the civil parish of Kildallan, barony of Tullyhunco, County Cavan, Ireland.

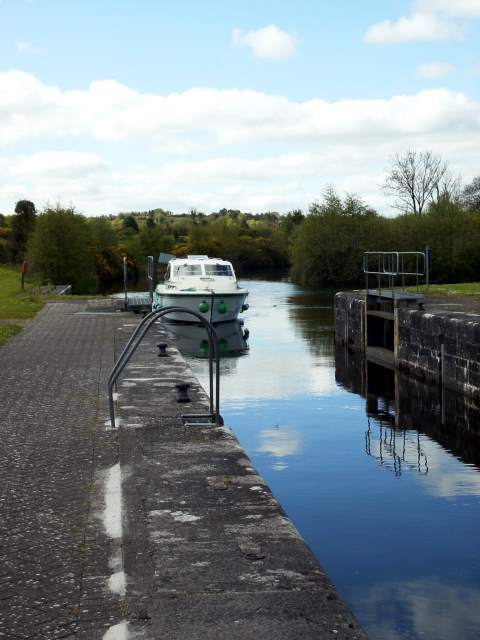
Lock 3, Skellan Lock on the Shannon Erne Waterway - geograph.org.uk - 382691

== Geography ==
Kiltynaskellan is bounded on the west by Burren (townland) and Coologe townlands, on the east by Greaghacholea, Mullaghmore, Tullyhunco and Tullynabeherny townlands, on the south by Doogary townland and on the north by Callaghs townland. Its chief geographical features are the Shannon-Erne Waterway, small streams, forestry plantations and a quarry. Kiltynaskellan is traversed by minor public roads and rural lanes. The townland covers 548 acres, including 7 acres of water.

== History ==
The Ulster Plantation maps of 1609 spell the name as Keilnaskellan. The Ulster Plantation grants of 1611 spell the townland name as Kilteneskelane. A 1615 lease spells the name as Killesneskellan. A 1629 inquisition spells the name as Killesneskellan. A 1630 inquisition spells the name as Killeneskealan. A 1631 grant spells the name as Killneskillen. The 1641 depositions spell the name as Killinescellan. The 1652 Commonwealth Survey spells the townland as Kilteneskelane. The locals currently pronounce the name in an abbreviated form as Skaylan or Skelan.

From medieval times up to the early 1600s, the land belonged to the McKiernan Clan. In the Plantation of Ulster in 1609 the lands of the McKiernans were confiscated, but some were later regranted to them. In the Plantation of Ulster grant dated 4 June 1611, King James VI and I granted 400 acres (160 hectares) or 7 poles (a poll is the local name for townland) of land in Tullyhunco at an annual rent of £4 5s. 4d., to Bryan McKearnan, gentleman, comprising the modern-day townlands of Clontygrigny, Cornacrum, Cornahaia, Derrinlester, Dring, Drumlarah, Ardlougher and Kiltynaskellan. Under the terms of the grant, McKearnan was obliged to build a house on this land. The said Brian 'Bán' Mág Tighearnán (anglicized 'Blonde' Brian McKiernan) was chief of the McKiernan Clan of Tullyhunco, County Cavan, Ireland from 1588 until his death on 4 September 1622. In a visitation by George Carew, 1st Earl of Totnes in autumn 1611, it was recorded, McKyernan removed to his proportion and is about building a house. On 23 March 1615, Mág Tighearnán granted a lease on these lands to James Craig. On 14 March 1630, an Inquisition of King Charles I of England held in Cavan Town stated that Brian bane McKiernan died on 4 September 1622, and his lands comprising seven poles and three pottles in Clonkeen, Clontygrigny, Cornacrum, Derrinlester, Dring townland, Killygorman, Kiltynaskellan and Mullaghdoo, Cavan went to his nearest relatives. The most likely inheritors being Cahill, son of Owen McKiernan; Brian, son of Turlough McKiernan and Farrell, son of Phelim McKiernan, all aged over 21 and married. On 26 April 1631 a re-grant was made to Sir James Craige, which included the lands of Killneskillen. Sir James Craig died in the siege of Croaghan Castle on 8 April 1642. His land was inherited by his brother John Craig of Craig Castle, County Cavan and of Craigston, County Leitrim, who was chief doctor to both King James I and Charles I.

At Cavan, on 26 July 1642, Thomas and William Jones gave the names of rebel leaders in the Cavan Irish Rebellion of 1641, including Thomas mac Shane mac Edmond oge McKernan of Killinescellan, William mac Shane Mc Kernan of same, Bryan mac Shane McKernan of same and Owen mac Shane McKernan of same. After the rebellion concluded, the land was confiscated in the Cromwellian Settlement and the 1652 Commonwealth Survey lists the townland (described therein as wasteland) as belonging to Lewis Craig. In the Hearth Money Rolls compiled on 29 September 1663 there were four Hearth Tax payers in Killeskellan- Philip O Bakachan, Thomas Magawran, Brian Siridin and James Siridin. Lord John Carmichael (b.1710- d.1787), the 4th Earl of Hyndford of Castle Craig, County Cavan, inherited the lands from the Craig estate and by lease dated June 1732 he leased Kiltynaskellan to James Thornton of Aghaweenagh, Tullyhunco, County Cavan at a rent of eighteen pounds sterling per annum.

From the 18th century, Kiltynaskellan formed part of the Thornton estate of Greenville, County Cavan. The estate papers are now in Cavan Archives Service and those papers mentioning Kiltynaskellan are at reference numbers P016/005; P016/006; P016/016 and P016/018.

The 1790 Cavan Carvaghs list spells the townland name as Killynaskellan.

The Tithe Applotment Books for 1827 list fifteen tithepayers in the townland.

The Kiltynaskellan Valuation Office Field books are available for May 1838.

An 1845 report on the canalisation of the Shannon-Erne Waterway states- The river channel retains the same characteristics upwards to the western extremity of the narrow valley formed by the high land approaching on each side of the river, in the townlands of Killynaskeelan and Coologue. Here on the south side of the river in Killynaskeelan townland, there is a large quarry and the limestone is open to the day along the verge of the river; on the north or Coologue townland side it is not so visible; it runs obliquely across the river from north-west to south-east; it is more extensive on the south side, measured parallel to the centre of the river, than on the north, the average length being about 275 feet. The next place in the ascent demanding particular notice is Skeeland ford or shoal; here the river is of great width, and the depth trifling; its course is very tortuous, and numerous small islands divide the stream into several channels. The river is crossed by two lines of stepping-stones, and the materials composing its bed are sand, gravel, and clay, and towards the upper end of the shoal, near Coologue Lough, masses of detached limestone abound.

Griffith's Valuation of 1857 lists nineteen landholders in the townland.

In 1863 Kiltynaskellan formed part of the lands being sold at auction belonging to the estate of Perrot Thornton, deceased of Greenville, County Cavan.

The 1938 Dúchas folklore collection tells a fairy story set in Kiltynaskellan.

== Census ==
| Year | Population | Males | Females | Total Houses | Uninhabited |
|---|---|---|---|---|---|
| 1841 | 103 | 48 | 55 | 18 | 0 |
| 1851 | 73 | 34 | 39 | 10 | 0 |
| 1861 | 61 | 31 | 30 | 10 | 1 |
| 1871 | 52 | 27 | 28 | 9 | 0 |
| 1881 | 54 | 24 | 30 | 13 | 0 |
| 1891 | 43 | 23 | 20 | 11 | 1 |

In the 1901 census of Ireland, there were eight families listed in the townland.

In the 1911 census of Ireland, there were ten families listed in the townland.

== Antiquities ==
1. A stone axe-head found 2.5 feet deep in Kiltynaskellan bog, now in the National Museum of Ireland.
2. A foot-bridge across the river
3. Stepping stones across the river in the 19th century
4. A ford over a stream
5. Lime kilns
