= Mauna =

Mauna or Mouna may refer to:

- Mauna (moth), genus of moths in the family Geometridae
- Mauna (silence), silence in Hindu philosophy
  - Maun Vrata, term for a vow of silence in India
- Mauna, Käbschütztal, village in Käbschütztal, Germany
- A Hawaiian word for mountain, used in the following Hawaiian volcano names:
  - Mauna Loa, on Hawai'i
  - Mauna Kea, on Hawai'i
  - Mauna Ulu, cinder cone of Kīlauea, on Hawai'i
  - Mauna Iki, cinder cone of Kīlauea, on Hawai'i
  - Mauna Haleakalā, on Maui
  - Mauna Hina, cinder cone of Haleakalā

== See also ==
- Maun (disambiguation)
- Mouna Ragam (disambiguation)
