= Rags (nickname) =

Rags is a nickname for:

== People ==
- Ernest Brown (coach), American football player and coach
- Rags Carter (1928–1993), American stock car racing driver
- Rags Faircloth (1892–1953), Major League Baseball pitcher
- John Kelly (rugby union, born 1974) (born 1974), Irish retired rugby union footballer
- Ravi Khote, Indian singer
- Rags Matthews (1905–1999), All-American football player
- Rags Morales, American comic book artist
- Clare Raglan (1927–2002), Canadian National Hockey League player
- Rags Ragland (1905–1946), American character actor
- Sébastien Raguin (born 1980), French rugby league player
- Dave Righetti (born 1958), American Major League Baseball retired pitcher
- Rags Roberts (1895–1963), American Negro league baseball player

== Other uses ==
- New York Rangers (1926–present), National Hockey League team

== See also ==
- Rag (disambiguation)
