= John Maxwell, 2nd Earl of Farnham =

Irish Representative peer and politician

John James Maxwell
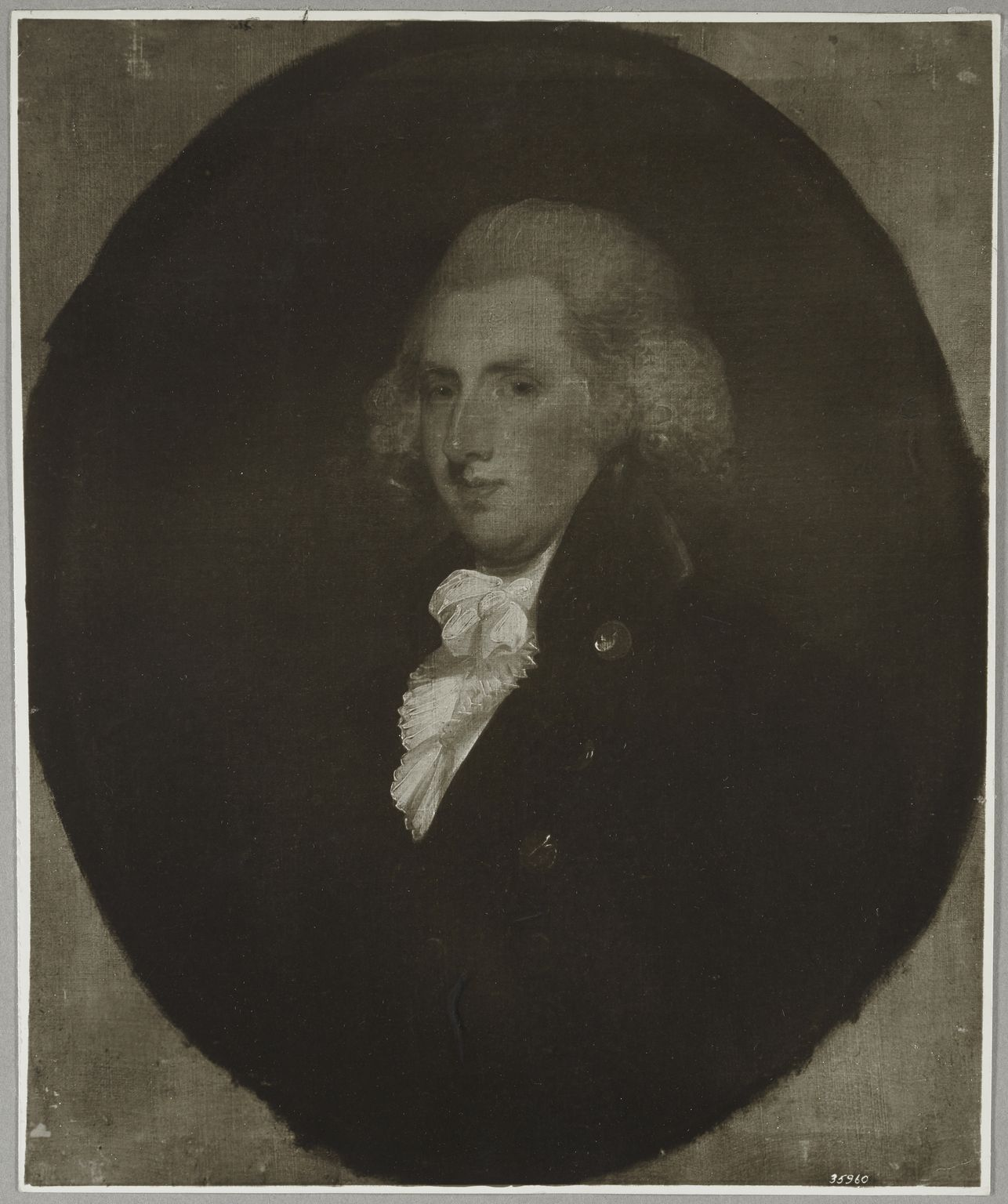
- portrait by Gilbert Stuart

Representative peer for Ireland
- In office 3 March 1816 – 1823
- Preceded by: Barry Maxwell, 1st Earl of Farnham

2nd Earl of Farnham
- In office 17 October 1800 – 1823

Member of the Irish Parliament for County Cavan
- In office 1780–1783
- In office 1793–1800

Personal details
- Born: 5 February 1759
- Died: 23 July 1823
- Spouse: Grace Cuffe

John James Maxwell, 2nd Earl of Farnham (5 February 1759 – 23 July 1823) was an Irish representative peer and politician.

He was the son of Barry Maxwell, 1st Earl of Farnham and Margaret King. He was known as Shane Rua due to his striking head of red hair. In 1784, he married Grace Cuffe, daughter of Thomas Cuffe, however, they had no children. He succeeded as 2nd Earl of Farnham, 2nd Viscount Farnham and 4th Baron Farnham on 17 October 1800, also inheriting the Farnham estate in Cavan. He commissioned Francis Johnston, a Dublin-based architect, to design an extension to Farnham House.

Maxwell sat as a Member of Parliament (MP) for County Cavan from 1780 until 1783 and again from 1793 until 1800. He was elected an Irish representative peer on 3 March 1816. On his death in 1823, the Earldom and the Viscountcy became extinct, whilst the Barony and the Farnham estate passed to his cousin John Maxwell-Barry

== Notes ==
Parliament of Ireland
Preceded by Hon. Barry Maxwell; George Montgomery	Member of Parliament for County Cavan; 1780–1783; With: George Montgomery	Succeeded by George Montgomery; Charles Stewart
Preceded by Charles Stewart; Francis Saunderson	Member of Parliament for County Cavan; 1793–1800; With: Francis Saunderson	Succeeded by Francis Saunderson; Nathaniel Sneyd
Political offices
Preceded by The Earl of Glandore	Representative peer for Ireland; 1816–1823	Succeeded by The Lord Carbery
Peerage of Ireland
Preceded by Barry Maxwell	Earl of Farnham; 1800–1823	Extinct
Preceded by Barry Maxwell	Baron Farnham; 1800–1823	Succeeded by John Maxwell-Barry
