= Mouna Ragam (soundtrack) =

Soundtrack album by Ilaiyaraaja
- Released: 1986
- Genre: Film soundtrack
- Length: 22:43
- Language: Tamil
- Label: Echo
- Producer: Ilaiyaraaja

The soundtrack to the 1986 Tamil-language romantic drama film Mouna Ragam features five songs composed by Ilaiyaraaja and written by Vaali. The album was released through Echo on double LP, which features three songs on each side of the record, with "Nilaave Vaa" appearing twice. The film and its soundtrack was dubbed in Telugu, under the same name, whose adapted lyrics were written by Rajasri.

== Background ==
Mouna Ragam is Ilayaraaja's fourth and Vaali's second collaboration with Mani Ratnam; the composer had previously worked with Ratnam on the latter's debut film Pallavi Anu Pallavi (1983) and the lyricist worked on Pagal Nilavu (1985).

According to Martin Clayton, Trevor Herbert and Richard Middleton's 2003 book The Cultural Study of Music: A Critical Introduction, "Oho Megam Vandhadho" (featuring several teenage girls dancing) is a resemblance of Broadway and MTV style singing-and-dancing, that combined American music with Indian vocals (S. Janaki was the playback singer); the book further added that the song is a reworking of Gene Kelly's "Singin' in the Rain". The instrumental theme was partially inspired by the "Love Theme from Flashdance" from Flashdance (1983).

The majority of songs are set in Carnatic ragas; "Mandram Vandha" is set in Keeravani, with Natabhairavi notes. "Chinna Chinna Vanna Kuyil" is set in Gourimanohari, "Nilaave Vaa" is set in Sankarabharanam, and "Panivizhum Iravu" is set in Natabhairavi. The soundtrack accompanies classical instruments such as sarangi, nadaswaram, sitar used in the background score, while synth instruments and orchestral music is also included.

== Track listing ==
=== Tamil ===
All lyrics are written by Vaalee.

No.	Title	Singer(s)	Length
1.	"Oho Megam Vandhadho"	S. Janaki	4:25
2.	"Nilaave Vaa"	S. P. Balasubrahmanyam	4:36
3.	"Chinna Chinna Vanna Kuyil"	S. Janaki	4:24
4.	"Panivizhum Iravu"	S. P. Balasubrahmanyam, S. Janaki	4:32
5.	"Mandram Vandha"	S. P. Balasubrahmanyam	4:46
Total length:			22:43

=== Telugu ===
All lyrics are written by Rajasri.

No.	Title	Singer(s)	Length
1.	"Thadi Thadi Thalapu"	S. P. Balasubrahmanyam, S. P. Sailaja	4:46
2.	"Cheli Raavaa"	S. P. Balasubrahmanyam	5:00
3.	"Oho Meghamochene"	S. Janaki	4:27
4.	"Chinni Chinni Koyilale"	S. Janaki	4:27
5.	"Mallepoola Challagaali"	S. P. Balasubrahmanyam	4:48
Total length:			23:28

== Reception ==
A review from Ananda Vikatan named Ilaiyaraaja's music as one of the main aspects, beside the cinematography and performances. The duo Jayamanmadhan's review for Kalki was however critical of the song "Panivizhum Iravu" as one of the film's minus points, due to its pacing. (Note: In their review, the duo did not mention the name of the song, but mentioned that it was shot in Agra.) However, Shruti Ramakrishnan of The Hindu praised its composition as "brilliant" with the "percussion gets you hooked and the chorus is almost eerie". Rakesh Mehar of The News Minute said that "Ilaiyaraaja's wonderful songs stay with you long after the film fades from memory". On the film's 30th anniversary, Sify's Mahesh Pallavoor Raghunathan praised Ilayaraaja for using silence as music "to bring about an impact within the minds of the viewers". Pavithra Srinivasan of Rediff.com described the music as "impeccable".

== Other versions ==
"Mandram Vandha" was later adapted by Ilaiyaraaja and used twice in the 2007 Hindi film, Cheeni Kum as its title track and "Sooni Sooni".
