= Ragam (surname) =

Family name

Ragam (Surname)
- Ragam
- Religions: Hinduism
- Languages: Telugu
- Country: India
- Region: Andhra Pradesh; Telangana

Ragam surname (in Telugu రాగం) is a commonly used surname by Telgu people of the Telaga subcaste Kapu caste.

The people with Ragam surname belong to Palangula Gotra who lives in coastal regions of Andhra Pradesh in the Guntur and Krishna districts on the banks of Krishna River.

In Kapu culture, surnames have more importance compared to caste names when recognizing people.

In recent days, most of the population does not use caste titles in their names, but only uses surnames to denote their lineage.
