= Kildallan =

Civil parish in County Cavan, Ireland

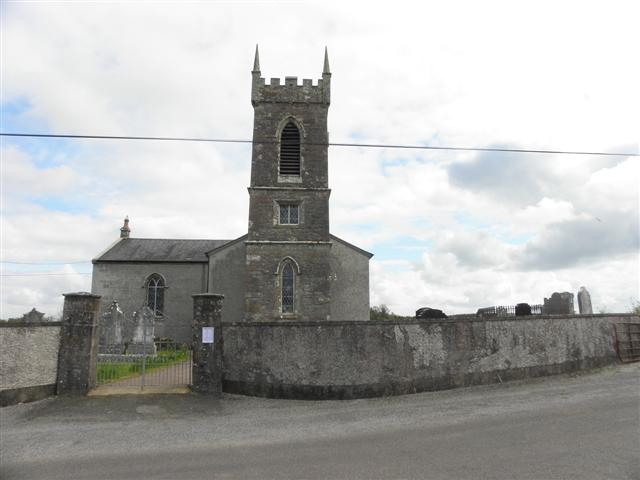
Kildallan Church of Ireland church

Kildallan is a civil parish in the historical barony of Tullyhunco, County Cavan, Ireland.

== Etymology ==
The name of the parish derives from Kildallan townland which is an Anglicisation of the Gaelic Cill Dalláin meaning the 'Church of Dallán Forgaill'. The earliest surviving reference to the name is for the year 1475 in the 'Calendar of Papal Registers Relating To Great Britain and Ireland: Volume 13, 1471-1484', where it is spelled Kylldallan. Another mention is in the Life of Saint Máedóc of Ferns complied 1536, where it is spelled as Cill Dalláin.

== Townlands ==
The townlands of Kildallan civil parish include: Aghabane; Aghaweenagh; Aghnacreevy; Ardlougher; Bellaheady or Rossbressal; Bocade Glebe; Breandrum; Callaghs; Carn; Claragh; Claraghpottle Glebe; Cloncose; Clonkeen; Clontygrigny; Clooneen; Coolnashinny or Croaghan; Coragh; Cormeen; Cornaclea or Tawlagh; Cornacrum; Cornahaia; Cornasker; Derrinlester; Disert; Doogary; Dring; Drumbagh; Drumbinnis; Drumbo; Drumcanon; Drumcartagh or Diamondhill; Drumcase; Drumerdannan; Drumgoohy; Druminiskill; Drumlarah; Drummany; Drumminnion; Drummully East; Drummully West; Evlagh Beg; Evlagh More; Glasstown or Port; Gorteen (Gorteenagarry); Gortnacleigh; Greaghacholea; Keilagh; Kildallan townland; Killarah; Killygorman; Killygowan; Killygreagh; Kilnacross; Kiltynaskellan; Listiernan; Mackan; Makief; Mullaghdoo; Mullaghmore; Mullaghmullan; Raleagh; Tonaloy; Tullynabeherny;
