= Clive Dring =

English cricketer

Clive Frederick Dring (born 30 June 1934) is a former English cricketer who played one first-class cricket match for Kent County Cricket Club. He was a right-handed batsman.

Dring was born in Shooter's Hill in metropolitan Kent in 1934. He was first spotted as a potential cricketer as a schoolboy and was selected for the Evening News Colts programme. He made four Minor Counties Championship appearances for the Kent Second XI between 1951 and 1955. His only first-class appearance came in 1955 against Lancashire at Old Trafford.
