= Raga (disambiguation) =

A raga is a melodic framework in Indian classical music.

Raga or raaga may also refer to:

== People ==
- Raageshwari Loomba (nicknamed Raaga; born 1977), Indian singer, actress, model, mindfulness speaker

== Places ==
- Raga, Arunachal Pradesh, a tehsil in India
- Raga, Bhutan, a town in Bhutan
- Ray, Iran, a city known in Old Persian as Ragā
- Raga, South Sudan, a town in South Sudan

== Surname ==
- Adam Raga (born 1982), Catalan Motorcycle trials rider
- Aliah Raga (born 2004), American gymnast

== Other uses ==
- Raga (Sanskrit term), a Buddhist and Hindu concept of character affliction or poison
- Rāga, one of three daughters of the Buddhist malignant celestial king Mara
- Raga rock, rock or pop music with a pronounced Indian influence
- Raaga.com, an Indian music streaming service
- Raga (film), a 1971 documentary film
- Raaga (film), a 2017 Indian film
- Raaga (radio station), a Malaysian Tamil-language radio station
- RaGa, nickname of Rahul Gandhi
- Raga language, a language of Vanuatu
- Republican Attorneys General Association

== See also ==
- Ragam (disambiguation)
- Ragi (disambiguation)
- Ragga, abbreviated term for Raggamuffin music, a subgenre of dancehall music or reggae
