= Cornahaia =

Townland in County Cavan, Ireland

Coordinates: 54°1′23″N 7°37′12″W

Cornahaia (Irish derived place name, Corr na hÁithe meaning 'The Round Hill of the Lime-Kiln') is a townland in the civil parish of Kildallan, barony of Tullyhunco, County Cavan, Ireland.

== Geography ==
Cornahaia is bounded on the west by Drumercross and Ned, Tullyhunco townlands, on the east by Killygar, Laheen and Tonaloy townlands, on the south by Ballynamony townland and on the north by Derrinlester and Raleagh townlands. Its chief geographical features are streams and a spring well. Minor public roads and rural lanes traverse Cornahaia. The townland covers 139 acres.

== History ==
The Ulster Plantation Baronial map of 1609 depicts the name as Cornahaha. Until the 18th century, the present-day townland of Cornasker formed part of Cornahaia. The Ulster Plantation grants of 1611 spell the townland name as Cornahah. A 1615 lease spells the name as Cornehae. A 1629 inquisition spells the name as Cornehae. A 1631 grant spells the name as Cornehae. The 1652 Commonwealth Survey spells the townland as Cornehah.

From medieval times up to the early 1600s, the land belonged to the McKiernan Clan. In the Plantation of Ulster in 1609, the lands of the McKiernans were confiscated, but some were later regranted to them. In the Plantation of Ulster grant dated 4 June 1611, King James VI and I granted 400 acres (160 hectares) or 7 poles (a poll is the local name for townland) of land in Tullyhunco at an annual rent of £4 5s. 4d., to Bryan McKearnan, gentleman, comprising the modern-day townlands of Clontygrigny, Cornacrum, Cornahaia, Derrinlester, Dring, Drumlarah, Ardlougher and Kiltynaskellan. Under the terms of the grant, McKearnan was obliged to build a house on this land. Brian 'Bán' Mág Tighearnán (anglicized 'Blonde' Brian McKiernan) was chief of the McKiernan Clan of Tullyhunco, County Cavan, Ireland, from 1588 until his death on 4 September 1622. In a visitation by George Carew, 1st Earl of Totnes, in autumn 1611, it was recorded that McKyernan was removed to his proportion and is about building a house. On 23 March 1615, Mág Tighearnán granted James Craig a lease on these lands. On 14 March 1630, an Inquisition of King Charles I of England held in Cavan Town stated that Brian bane McKiernan died on 4 September 1622, and his lands comprising seven poles and three pottles in Clonkeen, Clontygrigny, Cornacrum, Derrinlester, Dring, Killygorman, Kiltynaskellan and Mullaghdoo went to his nearest relatives. The most likely inheritors are Cahill, son of Owen McKiernan; Brian, son of Turlough McKiernan and Farrell, son of Phelim McKiernan, all aged over 21 and married. On 26 April 1631, a re-grant was made to Sir James Craige, which included the lands of Cornehae, which also included sub-divisions in the townland called Knocktullester, Carlea, Corneskear and Aghacarneagh. Sir James Craig died in the siege of Croaghan Castle on 8 April 1642. His land was inherited by his brother John Craig of Craig Castle, County Cavan and of Craigston, County Leitrim, who was chief doctor to both King James I and Charles I.

After the Irish Rebellion of 1641 concluded, the rebels vacated the land, and the 1652 Commonwealth Survey lists the townland as belonging to James Thornton.

The 1790 Cavan Carvaghs list spells the townland name as Cornaha.

The Cornahaia Valuation Office Field books are available for May 1838.

In the 19th century, the landlord of Cornahaia was the Reverend Francis Saunderson (b.1786), who was Church of Ireland rector of Kildallan from 1828 until his death on 22 December 1873.

Griffith's Valuation of 1857 lists ten landholders in the townland.

== Census ==
Year	Population	Males	Females	Total Houses	Uninhabited
1841	54	33	21	10	0
1851	53	31	22	8	0
1861	34	18	16	8	0
1871	32	19	13	6	0
1881	34	20	14	5	0
1891	30	18	12	5	1

In the 1901 census of Ireland, four families were listed in the townland.

In the 1911 census of Ireland, five families were listed in the townland.

== Antiquities ==
1. Leslie's river ford
