= Rag River =

River in County Cavan, Ireland

Coordinates: 54°08′02″N 7°28′01″W

The Rag River is a river in County Cavan, Ireland. It rises in Mullaghdoo Lough, in the townland of Aghnacreevy, parish of Kildallan, and flows in a north-easterly direction through the lakes of Clonty Lough, Togher Lough, Lough Rud, Aghavoher Lough, Killywilly Lough, Cuillaghan Lough, Tomkinroad Lough, Lough Tee Lower and Corraback Lough. It discharges into the Shannon–Erne Waterway in the townland of Corraback. It has a fish population of pike, bream, rudd, roach, gudgeon and perch. Archaeological finds in the river include dugout canoes, socketed bronze axes and Irish elk antlers. The structures of interest along the river include Ardlougher Bridge, Greenville Corn Mill, Togher Bridge, Cranaghan Bridge, Killywilly Cavan & Leitrim Railway Level Crossing, Killywilly Corn Mill , Killywilly Bleach Mill, Killywilly Bridge, Tomkinroad Cavan & Leitrim Railway Bridge, Tomkinroad Cavan & Leitrim Railway Station & Level Crossing, Tomkinroad Creamery, Drumrush Corn Mill & Weir, Droghill Bridge, Feedarragh Bridge & Stepping Stones.

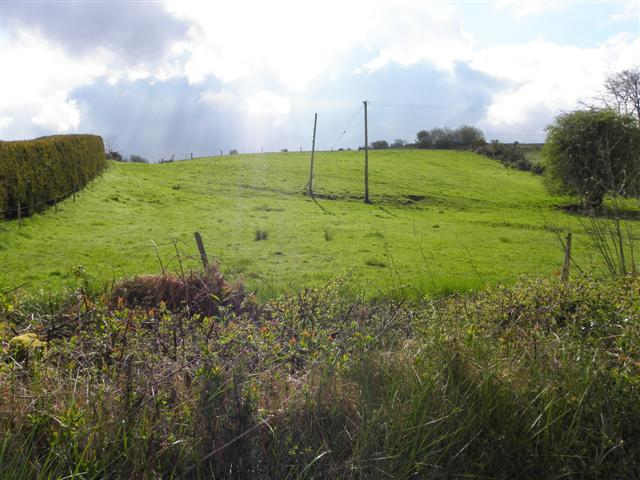
Aghnacreevy Townland (geograph 2914398)
