= Brinsley Butler, 2nd Earl of Lanesborough =

Irish politician and peer

Brinsley Butler, 2nd Earl of Lanesborough, PC (Ire) (4 March 1728 – 24 January 1779), styled The Honourable until 1756 and Lord Newtown-Butler from 1756 to 1768, was an Irish politician and peer.

He was the son of Humphrey Butler, 1st Earl of Lanesborough and Mary Berry, daughter of Richard Berry. He succeeded his father as 2nd Earl of Lanesborough in 1768.

From 1751 until 1768, he was a Member of Parliament (MP), or Knight of the Shire, for County Cavan in the Irish House of Commons, and was High Sheriff of Westmeath in 1763. He was educated at Trinity College Dublin.

As a Freemason, he was Deputy Grand Master of the Grand Lodge of Ireland from 1753 to 1756, and was elected Grand Master in 1757, a post he held until the next year.

== Family ==
He married Lady Jane Rochfort, daughter of Robert Rochfort, 1st Earl of Belvedere and his second wife Mary Molesworth. Their children were :

- Robert Butler, 3rd Earl of Lanesborough
- Hon. Augustus, father of George Butler-Danvers, 5th Earl of Lanesborough
- Lady Mary, who married George Ponsonby, Lord Chancellor of Ireland
- Lady Catherine, who married George Marlay, an army officer, only son of George Marlay, Bishop of Dromore
- Lady Charlotte, who married Hugh Debbing
- Lady Caroline
- Lady Sophia, who married Luigi, Marquis Marescotti of Milan.

His widow moved to Italy with her unmarried daughters, and there she gained an unenviable reputation for immorality and extravagance: in 1786 she fled from Naples to avoid being arrested for debt. When her daughter Sophia married a Milanese nobleman, the Marquis Marescotti, Emma, Lady Hamilton asked unkindly if the mother had sold the daughter off to pay her debts. She remarried John King, who had reputedly been her lover for some time, and died in 1828.

== Arms ==
Coat of arms of Brinsley Butler, 2nd Earl of Lanesborough

Coronet
A Coronet of an Earl
Crest
1st: A Wyvern with wings elevated and tail nowed Or the dexter paw supporting a Shield Argent thereon a Bend Gules charged with three Martlets Gold (Danvers); 2nd: A Demi Cockatrice couped Vert wings elevated Argent combed beaked wattled and ducally gorged Or (Butler)
Escutcheon
Quarterly: 1st and 4th, Gules a Chevron wavy between three Mullets of six points radiant Or pierced Azure (Danvers); 2nd and 3rd, Argent three Covered Cups in bend between two Bendlets engrailed Sable (Butler)
Supporters
On the dexter side a Cockatrice Vert with wings elevated Argent combed beaked wattled and ducally gorged Or, and on the sinister side a Wyvern Vert gorged with a Plain Collar and chained Or
Motto
Liberte Tout Entiere (Liberty entire)

Parliament of Ireland
Preceded by Charles Coote I John Maxwell	Member of Parliament for County Cavan; 1751–1768; With: John Maxwell 1751–1756; Hon. Barry Maxwell 1756–1761; Charles Coote II 1761–1766; William Stewart 1766–1768	Succeeded by Hon. Barry Maxwell; George Montgomery
Masonic offices
Preceded by Hon. Thomas George Southwell	Grandmaster of the Grand Lodge of Ireland; 1757–1758	Succeeded by The Earl of Drogheda
Peerage of Ireland
Preceded by Humphrey Butler	Earl of Lanesborough; 1768–1779	Succeeded by Robert Butler
