= Barry Maxwell, 1st Earl of Farnham =

Irish politician

The Earl of Farnham
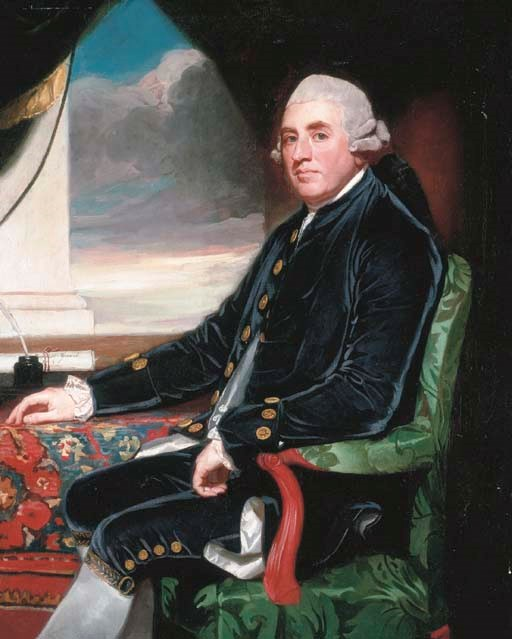
- portrait by George Romney

1st Earl of Farnham
- In office 1785–1800

Member of the Irish Parliament for Cavan Borough
- In office 1756–1760
- In office 1768–1779

Member of the Irish Parliament for Armagh Borough
- In office 1761–1768

Personal details
- Born: 1723
- Died: 7 October 1800 (aged 76–77)
- Spouses: Margaret King; Grace Burdett
- Children: 5, including John James Maxwell, 2nd Earl of Farnham
- Parents: John Maxwell, 1st Baron Farnham; Judith Barry

Barry Maxwell, 1st Earl of Farnham PC (Ire) (1723 – 7 October 1800), styled The Honourable Barry Maxwell from 1756 to 1779, was an Irish peer and politician. He succeeded as the 3rd Baron Farnham in 1779, and was later created the 1st Viscount Farnham in 1781 and, in 1785, he was further advanced in the Peerage of Ireland as the 1st Earl of Farnham.

== Background ==
He was the son of John Maxwell, 1st Baron Farnham and Judith Barry.

== Political career ==
He was Prothonotary of the Court of Common Pleas between 1741 and 1800, was called to the Irish Bar in 1748 and was appointed a Bencher in 1757. On his brother's death in November 1779, he succeeded as the 3rd Baron Farnham, inheriting the Farnham estate. He commissioned James Wyatt, one of the most fashionable architects of the time, to design a new house. These plans are now housed in the Metropolitan Museum of Art in New York.

Lord Farnham was created Viscount Farnham on 10 January 1781, Earl of Farnham on 22 June 1785, and became a Privy Councillor in Ireland on 6 June 1796. From 1756 to 1760 and again from 1768 to 1779, he sat in the Irish House of Commons for Cavan Borough. Between 1761 and 1768, he represented Armagh Borough.

== Family ==
He married twice, firstly in January 1757 to Margaret King, daughter of Robert King of Drewstown. They had the following children:

- John James Maxwell, 2nd Earl of Farnham (5 February 1760 – 23 July 1823).
- Anne Maxwell; she married Richard Fox of Fox Hall in 1787.
- Judith Maxwell, died unmarried in 1818.

He then married secondly on 5 August 1771 to Grace Burdett, daughter of Arthur Burdett of Ballymaney. They had the following issue:

- Grace Maxwell (died 19 June 1866); she married Sir Ralph St George, 7th Baronet (1758–1842)
- Elizabeth Maxwell, died unmarried in January 1782.

On his death, he was succeeded by his son John James.

== Notes ==
Parliament of Ireland
Preceded by John Maxwell; Hon. Brinsley Butler	Member of Parliament for Cavan Borough; 1756–1761; With: Lord Newtown-Butler	Succeeded by Brinsley Butler, Lord Newtown-Butler; Charles Coote
Preceded by Robert Cuninghame; Hon. John Ponsonby	Member of Parliament for Armagh Borough; 1761–1768; With: Robert Cuninghame	Succeeded by George Macartney; Philip Tisdall
Preceded by Lord Newtown-Butler; William Stewart	Member of Parliament for Cavan Borough; 1768–1780; With: George Montgomery	Succeeded by George Montgomery; Hon. John James Maxwell
Peerage of Ireland
New creation	Earl of Farnham; 1785–1800	Succeeded by John Maxwell
New creation	Viscount Farnham; 1781–1800	Succeeded by John Maxwell
Preceded by Robert Maxwell	Baron Farnham; 1779–1800	Succeeded by John Maxwell
