= Tullyhunco =

Barony in County Cavan, Ireland

Tullyhunco Teallach Dhúnchadha (Irish)
- Barony
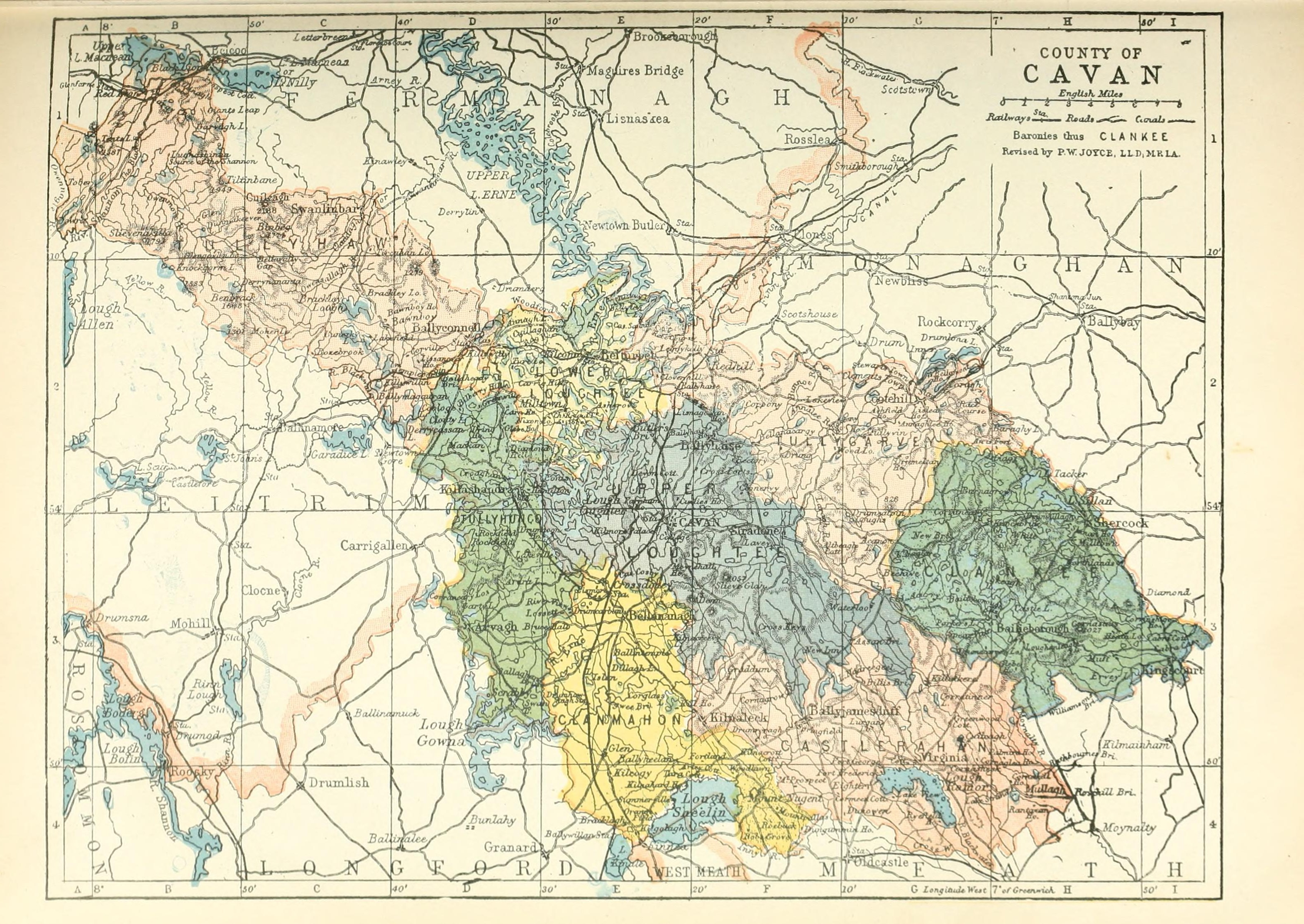
- Barony map of County Cavan, 1900; Tullyhunco is in the west, coloured green.

- Location within Ireland
- Coordinates: 54°0′N 7°33′W
- Sovereign state: Ireland
- Province: Ulster
- County: Cavan

Area
  - Total: 160.35 km^{2} (61.91 sq mi)

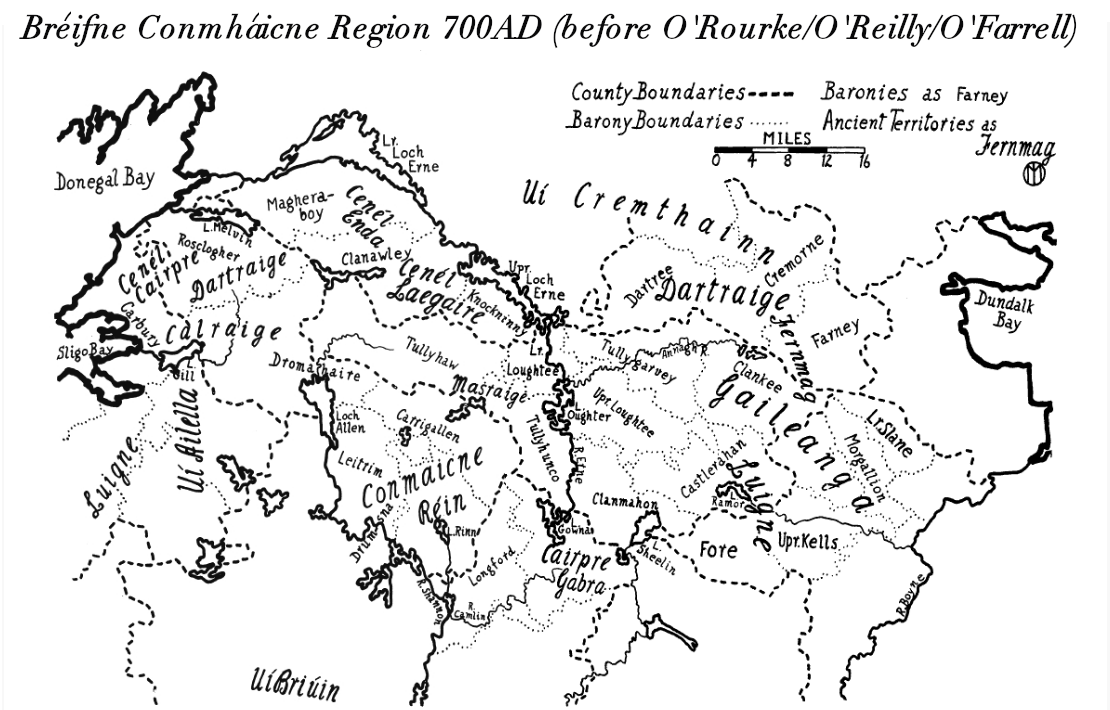
Map of Breifne in AD 700; Tullyhunco is seen to the west of the Erne, near the Masraige territory.

Tullyhunco (Irish: Teallach Dhúnchadha) is a barony in County Cavan, Ireland. It comprises the civil parishes of Kildallan, Killeshandra and Scrabby.

== Location ==
Tullyhunco is located in western County Cavan. It borders County Leitrim to the west and County Longford to the south. At 165.5 km2 (40,872 acres), Tullyhunco is the second smallest of Cavan's eight baronies after Loughtee Lower.

== History ==
The territory was historically known as Teallach Dhúnchadha and was ruled by clan Mág Tighearnán. Another name for it was Clonballykernan. For centuries it was part of the Kingdom of Breifne, a loose union of chiefdoms that the O'Rourkes ruled as overlords. Following the dissolution of the kingdom, the area was still in the orbit of the O'Rourke kingdom of West Breifne until the early 1500s, when the Mág Tighearnáns switched allegiance to the O'Reilly of East Breifne. In 1579 the area was subsumed into the newly formed county of Cavan. In 1584 the barony of Tullyhunco was officially demarcated and granted to clan Mág Tighearnán by the Kingdom of Ireland.

== List of settlements ==
Settlements in Tullyhunco include:

- Arvagh
- Killeshandra
- Cornafean
