= Camalier =

Townland in Ardue, County Cavan, Ireland

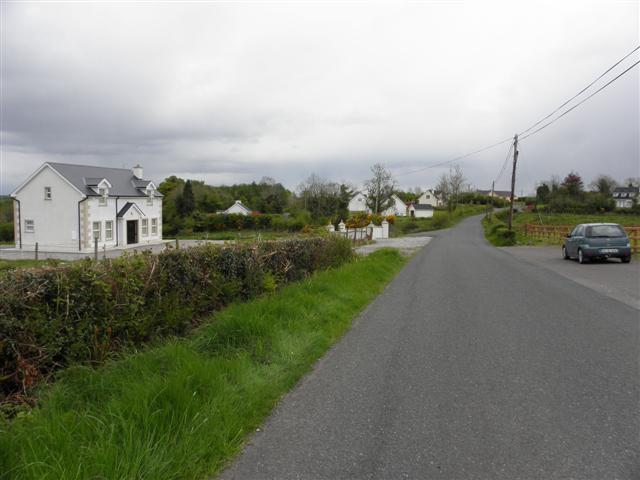
Road at Camalier - geograph.org.uk - 1855044

Camalier is a townland in the civil parish of Drumlane, Barony of Loughtee Lower, County Cavan, Ireland.

== Etymology ==
The townland name is an anglicisation of a Gaelic placename, Cam Ladhar, meaning "The Crooked Fork" (either of a river or a road). The local pronunciation is Kam-Ah-Leer. The earliest surviving mention of the townland is on the 1609 Ulster Plantation map of the Barony of Loughtee, where it is spelled Camlier. A 1610 grant spells it as Camlier. The 1641 Rebellion Depositions spell it as Comliere. The 1654 Commonwealth Survey spells it as Camleyer. The 1660 Books of Survey and Distribution spell it as Camleare. The 1661 Inquisitions spell it as Camleer.

== Geography ==
Camalier is bounded on the north by Corraquill and Tirgormly townlands, on the east by Drumrush townland, on the south by Tomassan townland and on the west by Cuillaghan townland. Its chief geographical features are a small rivulet, woods & plantations, several drumlin hills which reach heights over 200 feet above sea-level and dug wells. The townland is traversed by the local L1506 Road (known locally as the 'Yellow Road', so named because it was originally surfaced with yellow gravel and sandstone), minor roads and lanes. Camalier has an area of 99 acres.

== History ==
From medieval times until 1606, the townland formed part of the lands owned by the O'Reilly clan. William Tyrrell, the brother of Richard Tyrrell of Tyrrellspass, County Westmeath, purchased Camalier c.1606 from the O'Reillys. A schedule, dated 31 July 1610, of the lands William Tyrrell owned in Loughtee prior to the Ulster Plantation included: Camleye, one pole. The Commissioners of the Plantation stated: We find that Mr William Tirrell hath had ye possession of these polls some 4 years, of some a lesse tyme without title but only by agreement with some of the natives for protection. In the Plantation of Ulster, Tyrrell swapped his lands in Camalier for additional land in the barony of Tullygarvey where he lived at the time.

An Ulster Plantation grant of the 'Manor of Monaghan', dated 21 June 1610, from King James VI and I to Sir Hugh Wyrral, a native of Enfield, Essex, England, included one poll of Camlier. On 2 December 1628 the Manor of Monaghan, which included Camalier, was re-granted to Sir Edward Bagshawe of Finglas, who then renamed the estate as Castle Bagshaw.

On 8 January 1642, Jane Taylor of Camalier made the following deposition about the Irish Rebellion of 1641:

"Jane Taylor, the wife of Benjamin Taylor of Comliere in the parish of Drumlane and the County of Cavan, beinge sworne uppon the holy Evangelists; saith that her husband Benjamin Taylor was possessed att the time of the Risinge of the Rebellious Irish in the North of Ireland, vizt the 23th of October last, of leases of howses and lands in & belonginge to the towne of Belturbat for 900 & odd yeares beinge better then the rents he paid

£6 per annum worth £60

Redy money taken from him £10

twenty mylch Cowes & a bull taken from him £40

ten 3 yeare old heyfers next May with calfe £16-6s-8d

5 tow yeare old heyfers next May & a young bull £7-10s

one faire bredinge mare within foale £5

In houshold goods and weareinge clothes £20

In tanhouse & tanyard in hydes & Leather worth £20

In all taken from him and dispossessed of £178-16s-8d by Phillip mc Hugh O'Rely, Mulmore O'Rely then high Shiriffe of the County of Cavan, there followers & assistants the 1th day of November followinge, and moreover the said Benjamin, his wife & three Children in there Journey towards Dublin were stripped of all there clothes and provision att or neare vnto the towne of Oghill, uppon the 2d of November, beinge there assalted with multitudes of confederats of the said O'Relys, the said Rebells beinge armed with pikes, swords, pitchforks, and skeanes and the like. "

After the Rebellion was defeated, Sir Edward Bagshaw's daughter, Anne, married Thomas Richardson of Dublin, son of John Richardson, bishop of Ardagh, and the marriage settlement dated 28 May 1654 transferred the estate to the married couple. The 1654 Commonwealth Survey states the proprietor of Camleyer was 'Mr Thomas Richardson'. On 7 May 1661 the Richardsons sold part of the estate, including Camleer, to Major Humphrey Perrott of Drumhome townland, Ballyhaise, County Cavan.

A deed dated 4 March 1708 includes the lands of Camiliar.

A deed dated 10 March 1709 includes the lands of Camalier.

A deed dated 27 March 1709 includes the lands of Camillar.

A deed dated 2 December 1709 includes the lands of Camalier.

A lease dated 10 April 1777 demised lands, including Camalier, to James Berry for the term of 300 years. On 12 April 1850 the Berry Estate was ordered to be sold.

The Tithe Applotment Books for 1833 list six tithepayers in the townland.

The Camalier Valuation Office Field books are available for September 1838.

Griffith's Valuation of 1857 lists ten occupiers in the townland.

== Camalier Fife & Drum Band ==
This marching band was founded in the 1860s. The first bandmaster was James McHugh of Drumbarlum, who died in 1926. There were about forty band members and they travelled to events all over Cavan, Fermanagh and Monaghan. A hall was opened in the townland in 1932 and the band practised there. The band was disbanded in 1958 due to emigration. The last bandmaster was P.J. Flood of Cuillaghan, who died 8 November 2014.

== Census ==
Year	Population	Males	Females	Total Houses	Uninhabited
1841	69	31	38	12	0
1851	46	19	27	10	2
1861	36	16	20	8	0
1871	30	18	12	6	0
1881	28	14	14	5	0
1891	21	11	10	5	0

In the 1901 census of Ireland, there were four families listed in the townland.

In the 1911 census of Ireland, there were five families listed in the townland.

In 1995 there was one family in the townland.

== Antiquities ==
There are no known antiquities in the townland.
