= Tomkinroad =

Townland in County Cavan, Ireland

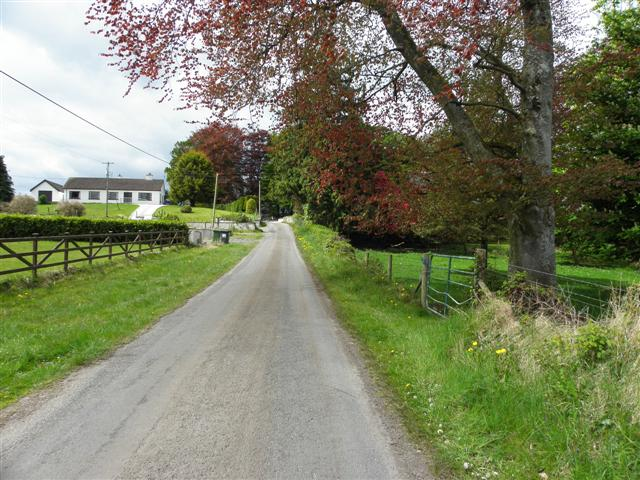
Road_at_Tomkinroad

Tomkinroad is a townland in the civil parish of Drumlane, Barony of Loughtee Lower, County Cavan, Ireland.

== Etymology ==
The townland name is an anglicisation of a Gaelic placename, the meaning of which is unclear. It could be either Tom Chinn Róid, meaning 'The Bush at the Head of the Road', or Tuaim Chinn Róid, meaning 'The Tomb at the Head of the Road', or Tuaim Chinn Ruadh, meaning 'The Tomb of the Three Redheads', an allusion to the men who killed the Irish hero, Conall Cernach at nearby Ballyconnell. The earliest surviving mention of the townland is on the 1609 Ulster Plantation map of the Barony of Loughtee, where it is spelled Tomchonro. A 1610 grant spells it as Tomchouro. A 1611 grant spells it as Tomchouroe. The 1654 Commonwealth Survey spells it as Tomcherrode. The 1660 Books of Survey and Distribution spell it as Tomkinerode. The 1661 Inquisitions spell it as Temconrode. The 1790 Cavan Carvaghs list spells the name as Tomkinrode.

== Geography ==
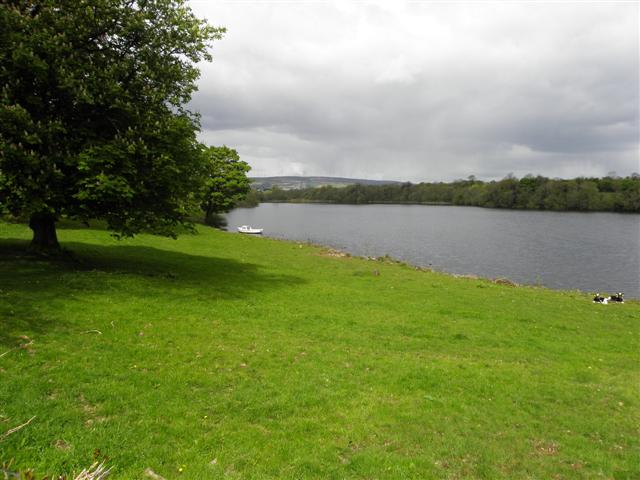
Tomkinroad Lough

Tomkinroad is bounded on the north by Drumrush townland, on the east by Carrowfarnaghan and Keenaghan townlands, on the south by Clowney townland and on the west by Ardue and Tomassan townlands. Its chief geographical features are Tomkinroad Lough, which contains a wide variety of coarse fish, Holy Lough, which is stocked with rainbow trout, the Rag River and a drumlin hill which reaches a height of 210 feet above sea-level. The townland is traversed by minor roads & lanes and the disused Cavan and Leitrim Railway. Tomkinroad Railway Station and Level Crossing were actually located in Drumrush townland, not in Tomkinroad townland. The area of the townland is 146 acres, including 36 acres of water.

== History ==
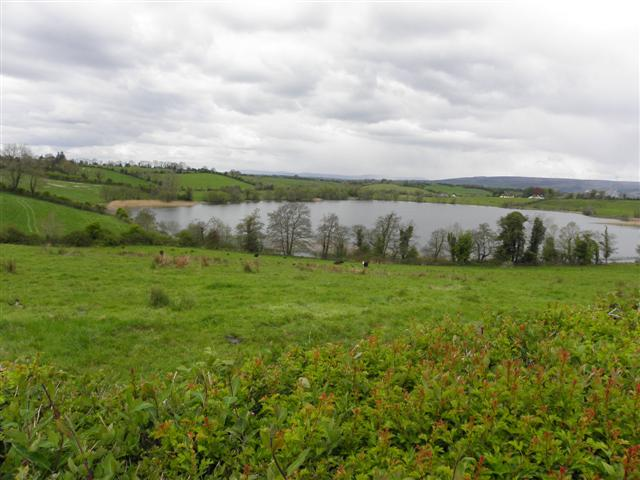
Holy Lough

An Ulster Plantation grant of the 'Manor of Monaghan', dated 21 June 1610, from King James VI and I to Sir Hugh Wyrral, a native of Enfield, Essex, England, included one poll of Tomchouro. On 2 December 1628 the Manor of Monaghan, including Tomkinroad, was re-granted to Sir Edward Bagshawe of Finglas, who then renamed the estate as Castle Bagshaw. Bagshaw's daughter, Anne, married Thomas Richardson of Dublin, son of John Richardson, bishop of Ardagh, and the marriage settlement dated 28 May 1654 transferred the estate to the married couple. The 1654 Commonwealth Survey states the proprietor of Tomcherrode was 'Mr Thomas Richardson'. On 7 May 1661 the Richardsons sold part of the estate, including Temconrode, to Major Humphrey Perrott of Drumhome townland, Ballyhaise, County Cavan.

The Tithe Applotment Books for 1833 list the landlord as Reverend William Grattan and the tithepayers as Phillips, Walsh, Walsh and Patterson.

The Ordnance Survey Name Books for 1836 give the following description of Holy Lough in the townland: The water contained in this Lough is remarkable clear, it receives no streams but is the source of a small one, its Bottom consists of shels and white marl which are used as manure; Lieut. J. Nixon states that he measured the depth of this Lough...20–30 ft. The water is so highly esteemed for its medicinal qualities in curing cattle they are brought from a considerable distance to it and to those not able to come the water is taken.

The Tomkinroad Valuation Office Field books are available for October 1838.

Griffith's Valuation of 1857 lists four occupiers in the townland, Phillips, Griffith, Walsh and McGovern.

In June 1921 an IRA volunteer, John McIntyre, was killed when blowing up the house of David Griffith in Tomkinroad.

The 1938 Dúchas Folklore Collection relates a story about Holy Lough.

A musical march for brass bands is named 'Tomkin Road' after the townland.

== Census ==
Year	Population	Males	Females	Total Houses	Uninhabited
1841	48	24	24	8	0
1851	24	12	12	5	0
1861	24	10	14	4	0
1871	10	3	7	3	1
1881	10	3	7	2	0
1891	6	3	3	1	0

In the 1901 census of Ireland, there were three families listed in the townland.

In the 1911 census of Ireland, there were four families listed in the townland.

In 1995 there were four families in the townland.

== Antiquities ==
1. Tomkinroad Creamery. Founded on 22 February 1898 as an auxiliary branch of Killeshandra Co-Op. In 1950 the original site at Tomkinroad Railway station was replaced by a new site on the land of William Goodwin and was finally closed in the 1970s. The managers were John Fitzpatrick 1898–1930; Dick Johnston 1930-1940 & Paddy Reilly 1940–1970.
2. Tomkinroad House, built c.1900.
3. A medieval crannóg in Holy Lough (Site number 1606, page 189, Tomkinroad townland, in "Archaeological Inventory of County Cavan", Patrick O’Donovan, 1995, where it is described as: Not marked on any OS ed. Oliver Davies in his National Museum of Ireland Survey of 1942 described an apparently artificial promontory rising about 0.3m above the water-level and jutting into Holy Lough in the Tomkin Road area. He noted that at the west the promontory was composed entirely of peat. At the east he identified a grey sandy clay at about 0.15m below water-level, and slight traces of a habitation layer at water-level containing charcoal and burnt and unburnt bones.)
