= Ardue =

Townland in County Cavan, Ireland

- Townland
- Interactive map of Ardue
- Coordinates: 54°6′19″N 7°32′2″W
- Country: Ireland

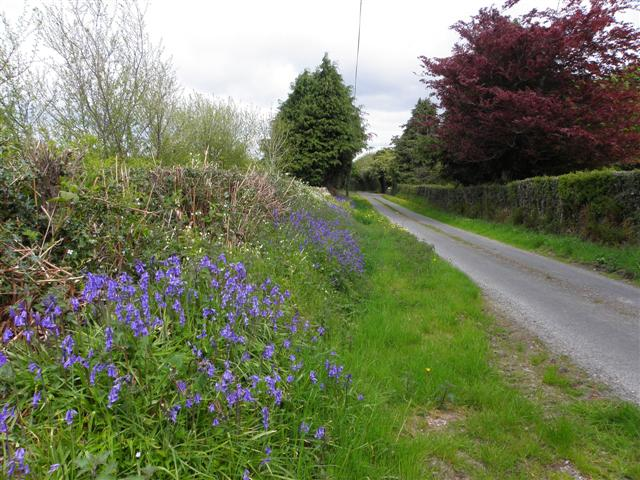
The Beeches, Ardue - geograph.org.uk - 1854919

Ardue is a townland in the civil parish of Drumlane, Barony of Loughtee Lower, County Cavan, Ireland.

== Etymology ==
The townland name is an anglicisation of a Gaelic placename, Ard Aodha, meaning 'The Height of Hugh'. The local pronunciation is ' Are-Dew '. The earliest surviving mention of the townland is on the 1609 Ulster Plantation map of the Barony of Loughtee, where it is spelled Ardea. A 1610 grant spells it as Ardea. A 1611 grant spells it as Ardea. The 1654 Commonwealth Survey spells it as Ardy. The 1660 Books of Survey and Distribution spell it as Ardy. The 1661 Inquisitions spell it as Ardea and Ardeagh. The 1790 Cavan Carvaghs list spells the name as Ardue.

A sub-division of the townland was named Culnagolly (Gaelic, possibly Cúil na Gualaigh, meaning 'The Corner of the Charcoal', or Coill na Gualaigh, meaning 'The Wood of the Charcoal'). On the 1609 Baronial map it formed a separate townland from Ardue. An Inquisition dated 30 September 1628 describes it as one poll in Culvagallye. The 1661 Inquisitions spell it as Callenegeally and it was merged into Ardue at that time as Ardue then consisted of two polls of land rather than the one poll it had in 1610.

== Geography ==
Ardue is bounded on the north by Cuillaghan townland, on the east by Clowney, Drumrush, Tomassan and Tomkinroad townlands, on the south by Ture, Drumlane townland and on the west by Cranaghan and Killywilly townlands. Its chief geographical features are Tomkinroad Lough,

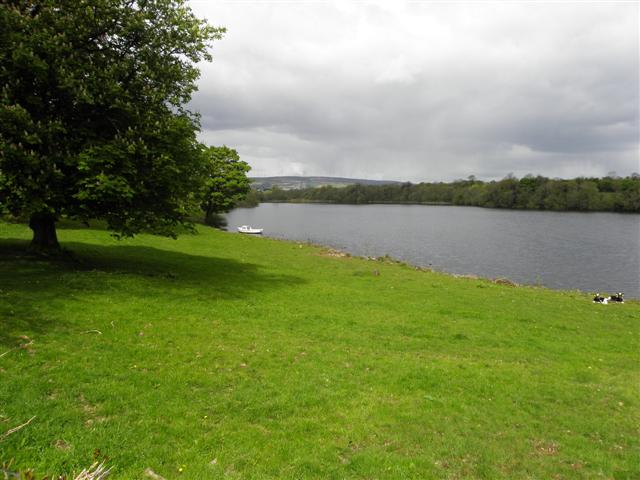
Tomkinroad Lough - geograph.org.uk - 1854986

Killywilly Lough,

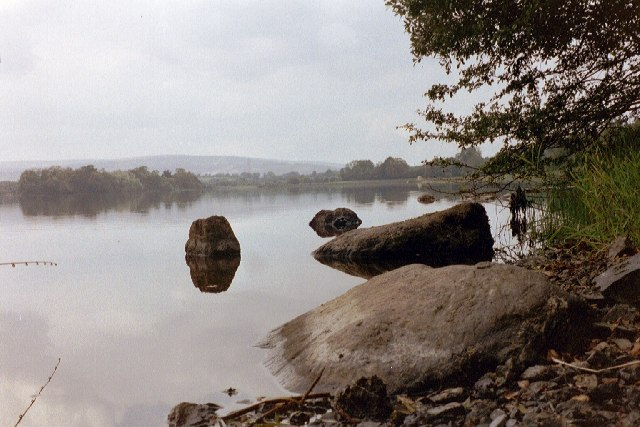
Killywilly - geograph.org.uk - 24715

Cuillaghan Lough all of which lakes contain a wide variety of coarse fish, the Rag River, a drumlin hill which reaches a height of 210 feet above sea-level, a spring well and a dug well. The townland is traversed by minor roads & lanes and the disused Cavan and Leitrim Railway. Ardue has an area of 210 acres, including 56 acres of water.

== History ==
From medieval times until 1606, the townland formed part of the lands owned by the O'Reilly clan. William Tyrrell, the brother of Richard Tyrrell of Tyrrellspass, County Westmeath, purchased Ardue c. 1606 from the O'Reillys. A schedule, dated 31 July 1610, of the lands William Tyrrell owned in Loughtee prior to the Ulster Plantation included: Ardhwe, one gallon (a gallon was half a poll, about 30 acres of arable land). The Commissioners of the Plantation stated: We find that Mr William Tirrell hath had ye possession of these polls some 4 years, of some a lesse tyme without title but only by agreement with some of the natives for protection. In the Plantation of Ulster, Tyrrell swapped his lands in Ardue for additional land in the barony of Tullygarvey where he lived at the time.

An Ulster Plantation grant of the 'Manor of Monaghan', dated 21 June 1610, from King James VI and I to Sir Hugh Wyrral, a native of Enfield, Essex, England, included one poll of Ardea. On 2 December 1628 the Manor of Monaghan, including Ardue, was re-granted to Sir Edward Bagshawe of Finglas, who then renamed the estate as Castle Bagshaw. Bagshaw's daughter, Anne, married Thomas Richardson of Dublin, son of John Richardson, bishop of Ardagh, and the marriage settlement dated 28 May 1654 transferred the estate to the married couple. The 1654 Commonwealth Survey states the proprietor of Ardy was 'Mr Thomas Richardson'. On 30 April 1661 the Richardsons sold part of the estate, including two polls of Ardea, to Captain Ambrose Bedell of Carn, Tullyhunco, County Cavan. Bedell, by his will dated 20 June 1682 and proved in Dublin 20 October 1683, devised, inter alia his lands in Ardue, first to his nephew James Bedell and his heirs male; and failing such to his nephew Ambrose Bedell (James Bedell's next brother) and his heirs male; and, failing such, to his (the testator's) heirs next in blood to his father William Bedell, late Lord Bishop of Kilmore.

In the Cavan Poll Book of 1761, there were two people registered to vote in Ardue in the Irish general election, 1761: Henry Patterson and Thomas Wood. They were each entitled to cast two votes. The four election candidates were Charles Coote, 1st Earl of Bellomont and Lord Newtownbutler (later Brinsley Butler, 2nd Earl of Lanesborough), both of whom were then elected Member of Parliament for Cavan County. The losing candidates were George Montgomery (MP) of Ballyconnell and Barry Maxwell, 1st Earl of Farnham. Absence from the poll book either meant a resident did not vote or, more likely, was not a freeholder entitled to vote, which would mean most of the inhabitants of Ardue.

Ambrose Leet's 1814 Directory states that the occupier of Ardue was Mr. Clemenger.

The Registry of Freeholders for County Cavan states that on 10 January 1825 there was one freeholder registered in Ardue: Alexander Clemenger. He held a fee-simple valued at £50.

The Tithe Applotment Books for 1833 list four tithepayers in the townland: Montgomery, Storey, Clemenger and Berry.

The Ardue Valuation Office Field books are available for September 1838.

Griffith's Valuation of 1857 lists four occupiers in the townland, Clemenger, Walsh, Lee and Berry.

== Census ==
| Year | Population | Males | Females | Total Houses | Uninhabited |
|---|---|---|---|---|---|
| 1841 | 35 | 20 | 15 | 17 | 0 |
| 1851 | 17 | 11 | 6 | 3 | 0 |
| 1861 | 12 | 7 | 5 | 2 | 0 |
| 1871 | 10 | 5 | 5 | 2 | 0 |
| 1881 | 8 | 4 | 4 | 2 | 0 |
| 1891 | 14 | 9 | 5 | 4 | 0 |

In the 1901 census of Ireland, there were five families listed in the townland.

In the 1911 census of Ireland, there were three families listed in the townland.

In 1995, there were six families in the townland.

== Antiquities ==
1. Killywilly Bridge. Stone bridge erected over the Rag River on border with Killywilly townland.
2. Corn Mill. Site of a 19th century mill owned by the Morrow family, but which existed from at least the 17th century. Part of the Rag River was converted into a Mill Race at this location. On the 1836 OS map it was located in Ardue townland, but the later maps changed the boundary, so it was then located in Killywilly townland.
3. Bleach and Flax Mill. On the 1836 Ordnance Survey map, it is shown as a bleach mill. It was owned by John Thomas Montgomery of Ture Lodge who converted it into a flax mill some time before 1869 at the cost of £180,000. It was totally destroyed by fire on 12 October 1868. On the 1836 OS map it was located in Ardue townland but the later maps changed the boundary, so it was then located in Killywilly townland.
4. A medieval earthen rath. (Site number 230, page 43, Ardue townland, in "Archaeological Inventory of County Cavan", Patrick O’Donovan, 1995, where it is described as: Marked 'Fort' on OS 1836 and 1876 eds. Raised circular area (int. diam. 43.6m) enclosed by a low earthen bank and a fosse identifiable only from ESE-SSE. Perimeter has been levelled from SSW-N-ESE but its outline is still clearly identifiable. Original entrance not recognisable. Internal area greatly disturbed.)
5. A medieval earthen rath. (Site number 231, page 43, Ardue townland, in "Archaeological Inventory of County Cavan", Patrick O’Donovan, 1995, where it is described as: Raised D-shaped area [int. dims. c. 72m NW-SSE; c. 53m ENE-WSW] enclosed from SE-W-NNE by a substantial earthen bank and a wide, shallow fosse, and elsewhere by Tomkinroad Lough. Traces of a possible counterscarp bank at the external lip of the fosse. An earlier report (OPW 1974) suggested that the original entrance may have been at SSW. Densely overgrown with vegetation.)
6. Cavan and Leitrim Railway Level Crossing. It is called the "Killywilly Crossing" but is actually located in Ardue townland. It was managed by the Geelan family. There are also two railway bridges over the Rag River, one of which has collapsed.
7. Ardue House & Lodge. This was the residence of the Clemenger family. Their pedigree is in the National Library of Ireland.
