= Agharaskilly =

Townland in County Cavan, Ireland

- townland

Irish transcription(s)
  - Derivation: Achadh Ros Cille
  - Meaning: "Field of the Church's Wood"
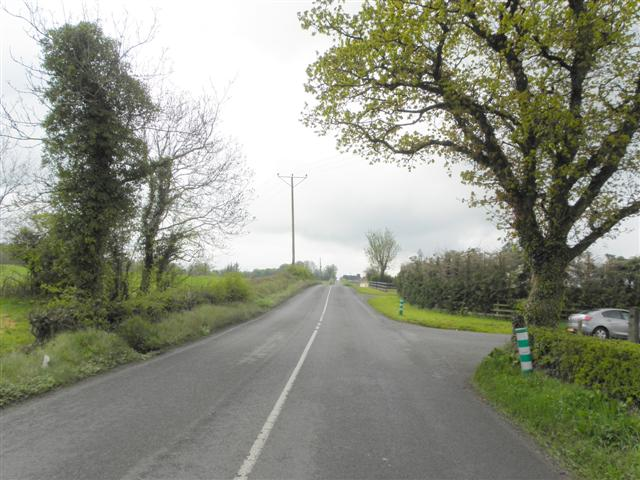
- Agharaskilly townland, Ballyconnell, county Cavan, Ireland. looking east south-east.

- Agharaskilly shown within Ireland
- Coordinates: 54°06′00″N 7°35′32″W
- Country: Ireland
- County: County Cavan
- Barony: Loughtee Lower
- Civil parish: Tomregan

Area
  - Total: 220 ha (550 acres)

Agharaskilly (from Irish Achadh Ros Cille, meaning 'Field of the Church's Wood') is a townland in the civil parish of Tomregan, County Cavan, Ireland. It lies within the former barony of Loughtee Lower.

== Etymology ==
The derivation of Agharaskilly is uncertain but the likeliest explanation is that it is an Anglicization of the Irish placename Achadh Ros Cille meaning the Field of the Church's Wood, as the land belonged to Tomregan Church and was wooded. It has also been suggested that it may come from an anglicisation of the Irish placename Achadh Chroise Coille meaning "The Field of the Cross of the Wood" or Achadh Ros Choille which means "Field of the Grove of Trees". Alternative meanings which have been suggested are "Cattlefield of the Cross of the Church", "Field of the Boar's Wood", "Field of the Crossroads in the Wood" and "Field of the Fighting-Cocks". The local pronunciation is Awr-sa-cullia.

The earliest surviving mention of the townland is in a grant dated 10 August 1607 from King James I to Sir Garret Moore, 1st Viscount Moore of Mellifont where it is spelled Aghcrossekille. On the 1609 Plantation of Ulster Baronial map of the barony of Loughtee, it is spelt Reskellew. A 1627 grant spells it as Aghocrossekeillie. The 1641 Rebellion Depositions spell it variously as Aghroskilly, Agheraskilly and Aighroskillow. The 1654 Commonwealth Survey spells it as Aghowraskillow and Aghowroskillow. A 1728 lease spells it as Aghyroskillew. The will of Terence Donocky dated 1735 spells it as Augharaskillane. A deed dated 1767 spells it as Agharisakella and Agharassakella. The 1790 Cavan Carvaghs list spells the name as Aghuraskillow.

== Geography ==
A sub-division of the townland is Derryliffe which is an anglicisation of the Gaelic placename Doire Life, meaning "The Oak-Wood of Liffey".

Agharaskilly is bounded on the north by Cullyleenan townland, on the east by Cavanagh (townland) and Mullaghduff townland, on the south by Cloncollow, Slievebrickan, Fartrin and Killarah townlands and on the west by Cormeen and Lecharrownahone townlands.

Its chief geographical features are the Shannon–Erne Waterway, which flows north along the western boundary of the townland, and several small drumlin hills reaching to 200 feet (61 m) above sea-level. Agharaskilly is traversed by the Killeshandra road and some minor lanes. The townland covers 550 acres (2.2 km^{2}), including 8 acres (32,000 m^{2}) of water.

== History ==
In the aforementioned grant dated 10 August 1607 from King James I to Sir Garret Moore, 1st Viscount Moore of Mellifont, the townland was described as the farm, termon or hospital of Aghcrossekille containing 2 polls at an annual rent of 6 ½ shillings. The two polls now form the two modern townlands of Agharaskilly and Fartrin.

On the death of Thomas Moigne, the Church of Ireland Bishop of Kilmore, on 1 January 1629, Sir Edward Bagshawe of Finglas, County Dublin, owner of the Manor of Castle Bagshawe, Belturbet, took adverse possession of Agharaskilly. William Bedell, who succeeded Moigne as Bishop of Kilmore disputed this act of Bagshaw's. Bedell petitioned Lord Viscount Falkland, the Lord Deputy of Ireland in August 1629 as follows:

Sir Edward Bagshaw, Knight, since the death of the late bishop, in the vacancy of the said sees hath entered upon two poles of land called Agarosikilly, parcel of the Termon of the see of Kilmore, whereof your petitioner's predecessor died seised. Your Petitioner humbly prayeth that he may be restored to the possession of the said lands enjoyed by his predecessor, and kept in the same, till the said Sir Edward Bagshaw shall show reason to the contrary to this Board.

The 1641 Rebellion Depositions give the names of Irish rebels living in Agharaskilly as: Conor Realy of Aighroskillow in the parish of Kildallen, gentleman; Torlough Manahan Rely of same, gentleman; Edmond Rely of same, gentleman; Owen Rely of same, gentleman; Hugh Rely of same, gentleman; Cahyre Rely of same, gentleman; Phillip Rely of same, gentleman; Bryan Rely of same, gentleman. On 19 September 1643, James Gardiner of Aghabane gave the following deposition about the Irish Rebellion of 1641 in Cavan:

James Gardiner late of Taghabane in the parrish of Kildallan in the County of Cavan, gent and tanner, sworne and examined sayth that in the beginning of the present Rebellion he this deponent at Taghabane aforesaid and alsoe at Correnery in the Parrish of Killasandra & County of Cavan was deprived robbed or otherwise dispoyled of his goodes & chattells consisting of horses, Mares a Coult beasts, Cattle, sheepe, corne, Malt, howshold goods provition, his stock in his tannhowse in Killisandra & of the possession Rents and proffitts of 2 farmes. All of the value & to his present losse of five hundred & twenty powndes sterling. And this deponent is like to be deprived of and lose the future profits of his said farmes (worth £20 per annum) until a peace be established: And further saith that the persons that so deprived & despoiled him of his said goods were actors in the present Rebellion and are named as followeth vizt.- Connor O’Rely of Aghroskilly in the same County, gentleman; John Mac Mulmore Rely of Killicrannah in the same County, gent; Gillernew McGaverran of Talloghagh, gente, and Charles Mc Gaverran of the same, gent; Keire O’Rourke of - in the County of Leitrim, gent; Myles O’Rely, then high sherriff of the said County of Cavan; Ferrall Mac Call O’Rely of Cashell in the same County of Cavan, gent, & divers others whose names he knows not, being their souldjers, Complicees and assistants.

Henry Baxter (the son of Martin Baxter, the first Protestant Vicar of Kildallan & Tomregan) also gave a deposition about the same O'Reillys: This deponent further sayth that Knogher Mac Farrell Oge O'Rely of Tomragin in the Barrony of Talloghknohoe, gentleman; Phillip Mac Farrell Oge, his brother; Laughlin McEnrow of BallymacEnrow, yeoman, all of the County of Cavan; Hugh Brady of Kildallon in the same County, gentleman; Turlogh Maergagh Ó Rely of Tomasin of the Barrony of Loughty & parrish of Lowghty, gent, were the Rebells that soe robbed and dispoyled him of his goods.

The aforesaid Conor Realy, Edmond Rely, Owen Rely, Hugh Rely and Phillip Rely were all brothers. They are mentioned in the genealogy of the O'Reillys as Conchobhar, Émonn, Eóghan, Aodh Riabhach and Phillip, the sons of Fearghal Óg, son of Fearghal, son of Phillip an Prióir, son of Maol Mórdha (Chief of the O'Reillys, died 1565), son of Seaán O'Raghallaigh (Chief, died 1516).

On 28 May 1654 Sir Edward Bagshaw gave the townland to his daughter Anne as part of her dowry on her marriage to Thomas Richardson of Dublin, son of John Richardson, bishop of Ardagh. The 1654 Commonwealth Survey states the proprietor of Aghowroskillow was 'Mr Thomas Richardson'. By a deed dated 30 April 1661 Thomas Richardson granted Aghacrossikilley alias Aghacrussacully to Captain Thomas Gwyllym, the landlord of Ballyconnell. Thomas Gwyllym died in 1681 and his son Colonel Meredith Gwyllym inherited the Ballyconnell estate, including Agharaskilly. Colonel Meredith Gwyllym died in 1711 and the Ballyconnell estate passed to his eldest son, Meredith Gwyllym.

A deed dated 2 May 1724 by the aforesaid Meredith Gwyllym includes the townland as Aghocrossikilly.

The Gwyllym estate was sold for £8,000 in 1724 to Colonel Alexander Montgomery (1686–1729) of Convoy House, County Donegal, M.P. for Donegal Borough 1725 to 1727 & for Donegal County 1727 to 1729.

A lease dated 14 May 1728 by the aforesaid Alexander Montgomery included Aghyroskillew.

Montgomery died in 1729 and left the Ballyconnell estate to his nephew George Leslie, who then assumed the name of George Leslie Montgomery. George Leslie Montgomery was M.P. for Strabane, County Tyrone from 1765 to 1768 and for County Cavan from 1770 to 1787, when he died and left the Ballyconnell estate to his son George Montgomery, whose estate was administered by the Court of Chancery as he was a lunatic. George Montgomery died in 1841 and his estate went to his Enery cousins of Bawnboy. In 1856 they sold the estate to take advantage of its increased value owing to the opening of the Woodford Canal through the town in the same year. The estate, including Agharaskilly, was split up among different purchasers and maps & details of previous leases of the sold parts are still available.

The Registry of Freeholders for County Cavan states that on 27 January 1825 there was one freeholder registered in Arisakilla - John Donoghoe. He was one of the Forty-shilling freeholders and held the land on a lease for lives from the Ballyconnell Estate.

The Tithe Applotment Books for 1827 list the following tithepayers in the townland- Reilly, Kernan, Donahey, Fitzpatrick, McKernan, Benison, Taylor, Browne, Jones, Sturdy, Cox.

The Ordnance Survey Name Books for 1836 give the following description of the townland- Achadh chroise coille, 'field of the cross of the wood'. It sits in the west of the parish. The property of Montgomery Esq. The land agent is Mr. Whitely of Ballyconnell. The property is in care of the Chancery Court. The land is held by a lease of lives or for 21 years. The rent per arable acre is 16 shillings to 21 shillings. It is then sublet at rents of 30 shillings to 38 shillings per arable acre. The county cess rate is 2s/6d per acre. The tithe is 9d an acre. The soil is light and produces oats, rye and potatoes. The houses are mostly of stone. The inhabitants are farmers and comfortable.

The Agharaskilly Valuation Office Field books are available for December 1838.

Griffith's Valuation of 1857 lists the landlords of the townland as representatives of William Enery, Seaton, McAdam, Donohoe, Cox and Jones and the tenants as Benson, Enery, Kiernan, Reilly, Fitzpatrick, McAdam, Donohoe, Cox, Hunt, Flanagan, Maguire, Kane, Reilly, Gregory, Latimer and Jones.

In the 1938 Dúchas Folklore Collection, there is a description of Agharaskilly in 1938 by James Reilly and another one by Philip Fitzsimons. There is also a list of Agharaskilly field-names in the collection.

== Census ==
Year	Population	Males	Females	Total Houses	Uninhabited
1841	95	45	50	19	0
1851	103	53	50	20	1
1861	89	41	48	19	1
1871	90	43	47	18	1
1881	84	46	38	17	0
1891	68	38	30	17	2

In the 1901 census of Ireland, there are twenty-one families listed in the townland.

In the 1911 census of Ireland, there are nineteen families listed in the townland.

== Antiquities ==
1. A medieval earthen ringfort situate in the south-east corner near the boundary with Cavanagh (townland). (Site number 201, Agharaskilly townland, page 39 in Archaeological Inventory of County Cavan, Patrick O’Donovan, 1995, where it is described as- Raised circular area (int. dims. 29.1m NNE-SSW; 26.4m WNW-ESE) enclosed by an earthen bank. From SSW-NNW bank has been modified and incorporated into the field boundary. Elsewhere it has been levelled but its outline is still identifiable. An earlier report (OPW 1969) recorded traces of an outer fosse and suggested that the original entrance may have been at SE).
2. A medieval earthen ringfort situate near the western boundary with Cormeen.(Archaeological Inventory of County Cavan where it is described as- Situated on level low-lying ground on the W bank of the Woodford River, with a small relict channel of the river just to its W. This is a circular grass-covered raised area (diam. c. 22m) defined by an overgrown earthen bank (at N: Wth 3.1m; int. H 0.7m) which is largely reduced to an overgrown scarp (H 0.7m) S-NW, but the perimeter has been removed elsewhere.).
3. In 1936 a wooden firkin of Bog butter was found in the bog at a depth of eight feet. It was probably deposited over 1,000 years ago.
