= Carrigan =

Townland in County Cavan, Ireland

Coordinates: 53°53′N 7°24′W

Carrigan is a townland in the Parish of Tomregan, Barony of Loughtee Lower, County Cavan, Ireland.

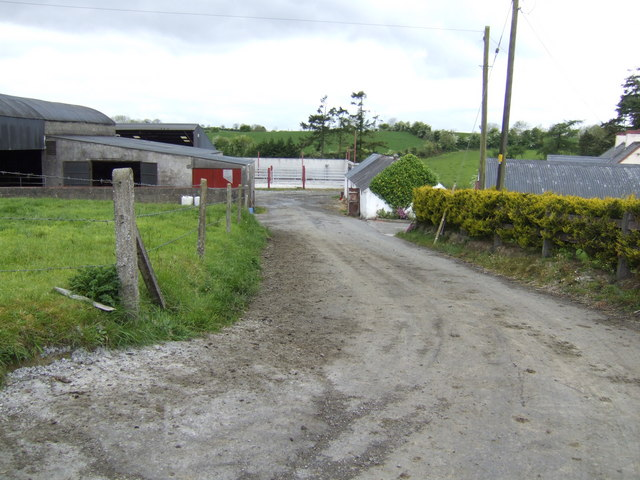
Farm near Carrigan, Co. Cavan - geograph.org.uk - 436974

== Etymology ==
The townland name is an anglicisation of the Gaelic placename Cairrig-ín which means 'A little rock or a rocky surface'. The oldest surviving mention of the name is in a 1790 list of Cavan townlands, where it is spelled Cargin.

== Geography ==
It is bounded on the north by Cavanagh & Cranaghan townlands, on the east by Aghavoher townland, on the south by Mullynagolman townland and on the west by Cloncollow townland. Its chief geographical features are Lough Rud, the Rag River and a drumlin hill reaching to 200 feet (61 m) above sea-level. Carrigan is traversed by Slievebrickan lane. The townland covers 104 statute acres, including 4 acres (16,000 m^{2}) of water.

== History ==
It formed part of the termon lands belonging to Tomregan Roman Catholic Church which were granted to the Protestant Bishop of Kilmore in 1610 as part of the Plantation of Ulster. By a lease dated 6 April 1612 the said bishop granted the lands to Sir Oliver Lambart of Kilbeggan, County Westmeath and Sir Garret Moore, 1st Viscount Moore of Mellifont, County Louth. On 17 July 1639 the bishop re-granted the lands to Charles Lambart, 1st Earl of Cavan. In the 1740s the bishop leased the land to John Jones for 21 years. This lease was renewed to his descendant John Copeland Jones on 20 May 1843. In the 1860s the holder of the lease was David Fielding Jones.

Ambrose Leet's 1814 Directory spells the name as Carrigan with the resident being Mr. Lanauze.

The Tithe Applotment Books for 1827 lists only one tithepayer in the townland- Andrew Lanauze.

The Ordnance Survey Name Books for 1836 give the following description of the townland- Cairrigín, 'a little rock'. 2 miles south of Ballyconnell. Bishop's land, held by Jones in perpetuity. Rent 5 shillings and 6d to bishop. Produces wheat, oats, barley and potatoes. Houses are made of stone.

The Carrigan Valuation Office Field books are available for 1838.

Griffith's Valuation of 1857 lists the landlord of the townland as Jones & the tenant as Morton.

== Census ==
| Year | Population | Males | Females | Total Houses | Uninhabited |
|---|---|---|---|---|---|
| 1841 | 17 | 10 | 7 | 3 | 0 |
| 1851 | 18 | 11 | 7 | 3 | 0 |
| 1861 | 18 | 10 | 8 | 4 | 0 |
| 1871 | 6 | 3 | 3 | 3 | 0 |
| 1881 | 5 | 3 | 2 | 2 | 1 |
| 1891 | 6 | 4 | 2 | 2 | 0 |

In the 1901 census of Ireland, there are two families listed in the townland.

In the 1911 census of Ireland, there are three families listed in the townland.
