= Tomassan =

Townland in County Cavan, Ireland

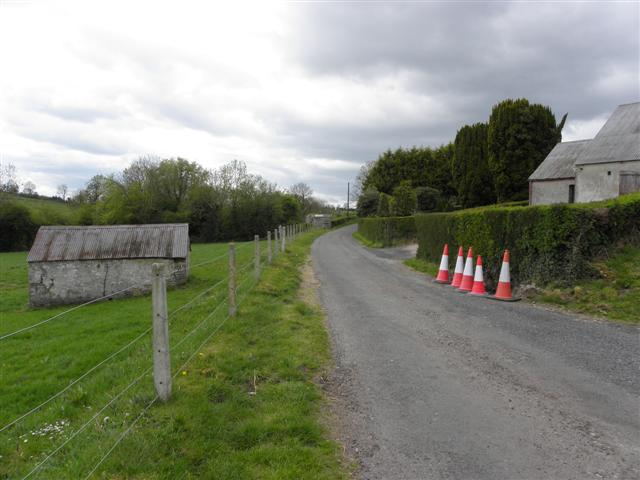
Road at Tomassan - geograph.org.uk - 1855017

Tomassan is a townland in the civil parish of Drumlane, Barony of Loughtee Lower, County Cavan, Ireland.

== Etymology ==
The townland name is an anglicisation of a Gaelic placename, Tuaim Easain, meaning either 'The Tomb of Easan' or "The Tomb of the Little Waterfall". The earliest surviving mention of the townland is on the 1609 Ulster Plantation map of the Barony of Loughtee, where it is spelt Tomasan. A 1610 grant spells it as Tomassan. The 1641 Rebellion Depositions spell it as Tomasin. The 1654 Commonwealth Survey spells it as Tuomashan. The 1660 Books of Survey and Distribution spell it as Tommassen. The 1661 Inquisitions spell it as Tumason. The 1790 Cavan Carvaghs list spells the name as Tomessan.

== Geography ==
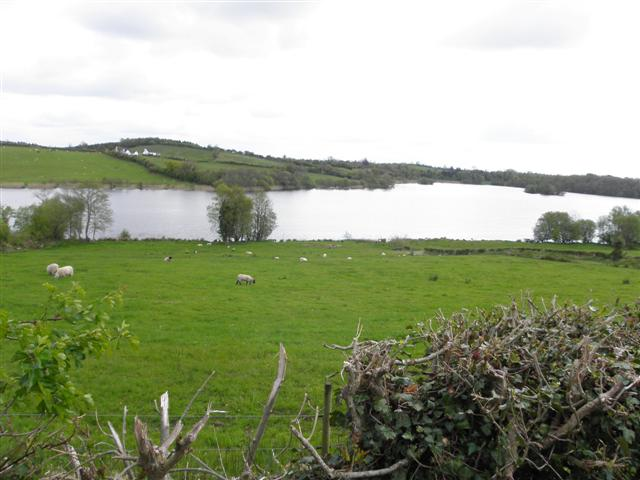
Cullaghan Lough - geograph.org.uk - 1854897

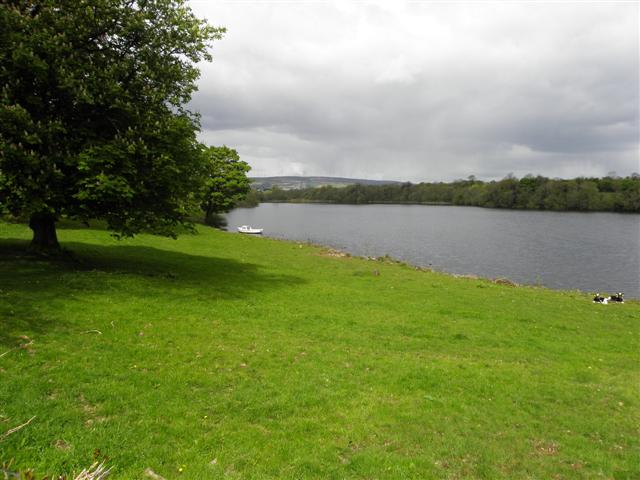
Tomkinroad Lough

Tomassan is bounded on the north by Camalier townland, on the east by Drumrush townland, on the south by Ardue and Tomkinroad townlands and on the west by Cuillaghan townland. Its chief geographical features are the Rag River, Cuillaghan Lough, and Tomkinroad Lough, both of which lakes contain a wide variety of coarse fish, a small rivulet, a small island in Cuillaghan Lough, woods & plantations, several drumlin hills which reach heights over 200 feet above sea level, a gravel pit, spring wells and a dug well. The townland is traversed by minor roads & lanes and the disused Cavan and Leitrim Railway. Tomassan has an area of 127 acres, including 26 acres of water.

== History ==
From medieval times until 1606, the townland formed part of the lands owned by the O'Reilly clan. William Tyrrell, the brother of Richard Tyrrell of Tyrrellspass, County Westmeath, purchased Tomassan c.1606 from the O'Reillys. A schedule, dated 31 July 1610, of the lands William Tyrrell owned in Loughtee prior to the Ulster Plantation included: Tomassani, one gallon (a gallon was half a poll or about 30 acres of arable land). The Commissioners of the Plantation stated: We find that Mr William Tirrell hath had ye possession of these polls some 4 years, of some a lesse tyme without title but only by agreement with some of the natives for protection. In the Plantation of Ulster, Tyrrell swapped his lands in Tomassan for additional land in the barony of Tullygarvey where he lived at the time.

An Ulster Plantation grant of the 'Manor of Monaghan', dated 21 June 1610, from King James VI and I to Sir Hugh Wyrral, a native of Enfield, Essex, England, included one poll of Tomassan. On 2 December 1628 the Manor of Monaghan, which included Tomassan, was re-granted to Sir Edward Bagshawe, who then renamed the estate as Castle Bagshaw.

At Cavan Town on 21 June 1643, Henry Baxter, the son of Martin Baxter the first Protestant rector of Tomregan parish, stated that during the Irish Rebellion of 1641, he was robbed by several rebels including Turlogh Maergagh ô Rely of Tomasin of the Barrony of Loughty & parrish of Lowghty gent. This was probably "Toirdhealbhach 'Meirgeach' (meaning freckled) O'Reilly", son of Cathal, son of Maol Mórdha. His grandfather was chief of 'An Bolgán', an old name for Drumlane.

After the Rebellion was defeated, Sir Edward Bagshawe's daughter, Anne, married Thomas Richardson of Dublin, son of John Richardson, bishop of Ardagh, and the marriage settlement dated 28 May 1654 transferred the estate to the married couple. The 1654 Commonwealth Survey states the proprietor of Tuomashan was 'Mr Thomas Richardson'. On 7 May 1661, the Richardsons sold part of the estate, including Tumason, to Major Humphrey Perrott of Drumhome townland, Ballyhaise, County Cavan.

A deed dated 4 March 1708 includes the lands of Tomassin.

A deed dated 10 March 1709 includes the lands of Tomasin.

A deed dated 27 March 1709 includes the lands of Tomassin.

A deed dated 2 December 1709 includes the lands of Tomasin.

A lease dated the 10th day of April 1777 demised lands, including Thomasson, to James Berry for a term of 300 years. On 12 April 1850, the Berry Estate was ordered to be sold.

The Tithe Applotment Books for 1833 list three tithe payers in the townland.

The Tomassan Valuation Office Field books are available for September 1838.

Griffith's Valuation of 1857 lists five occupiers in the townland.

== Census ==
Year	Population	Males	Females	Total Houses	Uninhabited
1841	29	12	17	4	0
1851	32	13	19	5	0
1861	22	11	11	4	0
1871	19	10	9	3	0
1881	26	11	15	4	0
1891	22	9	13	4	2

In the 1901 census of Ireland, there were five families listed in the townland.

In the 1911 census of Ireland, there were five families listed in the townland.

In 1995 there was one family in the townland.

== Antiquities ==
1. A medieval crannog on the island in Cuillaghan Lough, (Site number 1605, page 189, Tomassan townland, in "Archaeological Inventory of County Cavan", Patrick O’Donovan, 1995, where it is described as: Small circular island in Cuillaghan Lough, c. 150m from the shoreline. Marked on all OS editions. In 1907 Thomas Hall recorded ['Crannoge near Belturbet' in JRSAI, Vol. 37, 1907, pp.240-241] digging into a mound at the centre of the island and finding a substantial bed of ashes and debris incorporating coarse black sherds of pottery, fragments of quernstones, large quantities of broken bones and a grooved stone. An oak dugout canoe was discovered at that time on the SE shore).
2. A railway bridge and footbridge over the Rag River.
3. A ford and stepping-stones over the rivulet.
