= Cuillaghan =

Townland in County Cavan, Ireland

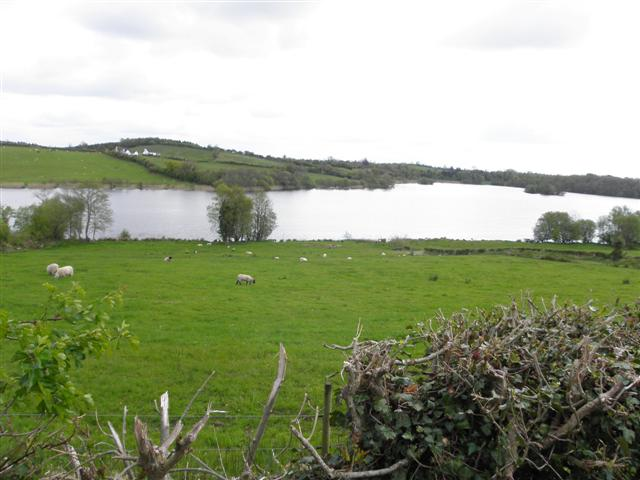
Cullaghan Lough

Cuillaghan is a townland in the civil parish of Drumlane, Barony of Loughtee Lower, County Cavan, Ireland.

== Etymology ==
The townland name is an anglicisation of a Gaelic placename, Coilleachán, meaning 'The Underwood' (i.e. a place full of shrubs). The local pronunciation is 'Kull-Ya-Han'. The earliest surviving mention of the townland is on the 1609 Ulster Plantation Baronial map of the Barony of Loughtee, where it is spelled Cullagan. A 1610 grant spells it as Cullagan. The 1654 Commonwealth Survey spells it as Quillaghan. The 1660 Books of Survey and Distribution spell it as Quillehan. The 1661 Inquisitions spell it as Callaghan alias Callagan and Quillaghan.

== Geography ==
Cuillaghan is bounded on the north by Corraquill and Dernagore townlands (both situated in the Northern Ireland part of the United Kingdom), on the east by Camalier and Tomassan townlands, on the south by Ardue townland and on the west by Annagh, County Cavan, Cloncoohy, which is situated in the Northern Ireland part of the United Kingdom and Killywilly townlands. Its chief geographical features are the Shannon-Erne Waterway, the Dhoogue stream, Annagh Lough,

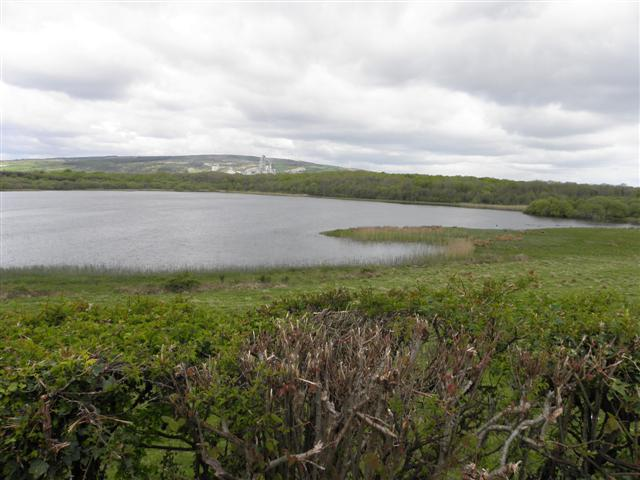
Annagh

and Cuillaghan Lough, which lakes contain a wide variety of coarse fish, woods & plantations, a drumlin hill which reaches a height of 271 feet above sea-level and dug wells. The townland is traversed by the local L1506 Road (known locally as the 'Yellow Road', so named because it was originally surfaced with yellow gravel and sandstone), minor roads & lanes. Cuillaghan has an area of 399 acres, including 38 acres of water.

== History ==
An Ulster Plantation grant of the 'Manor of Monaghan', dated 21 June 1610, from King James VI and I to Sir Hugh Wyrral, a native of Enfield, Essex, England, included two polls of Cullagan. On 2 December 1628 the Manor of Monaghan, including Cuillaghan, was re-granted to Sir Edward Bagshawe of Finglas, who then renamed the estate as Castle Bagshaw. Bagshaw's daughter, Anne, married Thomas Richardson of Dublin, son of John Richardson, bishop of Ardagh, and the marriage settlement dated 28 May 1654 transferred the estate to the married couple. The 1654 Commonwealth Survey states the proprietor of Quillaghan was 'Mr Thomas Richardson'. By a deed dated 30 April 1661 Thomas Richardson granted Quillaghan to Captain Thomas Gwyllym, the landlord of Ballyconnell. Thomas Gwyllym died in 1681 and his son Colonel Meredith Gwyllym inherited the Ballyconnell estate, including Cuillaghan. Colonel Meredith Gwyllym died in 1711 and the Ballyconnell estate passed to his eldest son, Meredith Gwyllym.

A deed dated 2 May 1724 by the aforesaid Meredith Gwyllym includes the townland as Quillaghan.

The Gwyllym estate was sold for £8,000 in 1724 to Colonel Alexander Montgomery (1686–1729) of Convoy House, County Donegal, M.P. for Donegal Borough 1725 to 1727 & for Donegal County 1727 to 1729.

A lease dated 14 May 1728 by the aforesaid Alexander Montgomery included Quillaghane.

Montgomery died in 1729 and left the Ballyconnell estate to his nephew George Leslie, who then assumed the name of George Leslie Montgomery. George Leslie Montgomery was M.P. for Strabane, County Tyrone from 1765 to 1768 and for County Cavan from 1770 to 1787, when he died and left the Ballyconnell estate to his son George Montgomery, whose estate was administered by the Court of Chancery as he was a lunatic. George Montgomery died in 1841 and his estate went to his Enery cousins of Bawnboy. In 1856 they sold the land to take advantage of its increased value owing to the opening of the Woodford Canal through the town in the same year. The estate, including Cuillaghan, was split up among different purchasers and maps & details of previous leases of the sold parts are still available.

The Tithe Applotment Books for 1833 list twenty-five tithepayers in the townland.

The Cuillaghan Valuation Office Field books are available for September 1838.

Griffith's Valuation of 1857 lists forty-four occupiers in the townland.

== Schools ==
In 1826 there were two hedge-schools in the townland. One was located on the left side of the Yellow Road at the lane entrance just before you enter Camalier townland. It was constructed of mud-walls with a thatched roof and clay floor. There were no desks and the pupils sat on handmade stools. The headmaster was Mr. Elliott, a Protestant, who also lived in the school. The curriculum was reading, writing and arithmetic, which the pupils wrote on slates using slate pencils. The older girls had to help with the cooking and cleaning. By 1833 the school had closed down and the Spotten family lived in the house for many years afterwards. The other school was also on the Yellow Road. The headmaster was Mr. Whyte. He has no house but stayed with a different family every night and also held night-classes therein. He was paid four shillings per annum from each pupil. They sat on a long plank resting on two big stones. Slates and paper were both used. The pens were quills and slate pencils. The pupils often had to sit on the clay floor.

== Census ==
Year	Population	Males	Females	Total Houses	Uninhabited
1841	185	95	90	32	0
1851	177	92	85	32	0
1861	106	55	51	21	0
1871	94	54	40	18	0
1881	92	55	37	16	0
1891	80	47	33	16	2

In the 1901 census of Ireland, there were twenty-four families listed in the townland.

In the 1911 census of Ireland, there were eighteen families listed in the townland.

In 1995 there were eleven families in the townland.

== Antiquities ==
1. A medieval earthen rath.
2. A medieval earthen enclosure.
