= Fartrin =

Townland in County Cavan, Ireland

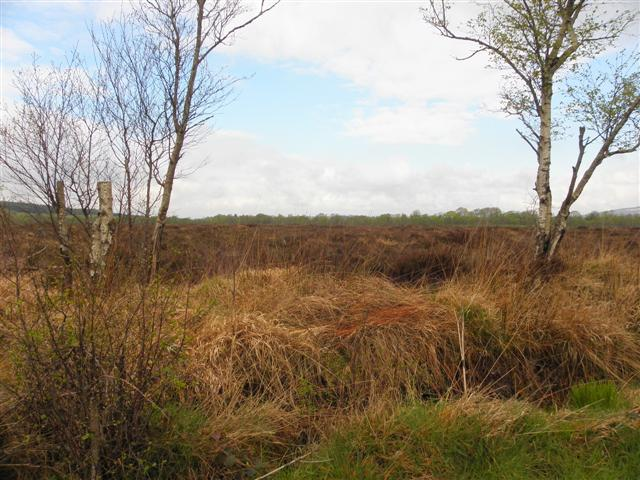
Fartrin townland, Tomregan, County Cavan, Ireland, looking WNW.

Fartrin is a townland in the parish of Tomregan, barony of Loughtee Lower, County Cavan, Ireland. It is 3 km south of Ballyconnell.

== Etymology ==
The townland name is an anglicisation of the Gaelic placename Far Druim which means 'The Outer or External Hill or Ridge". Alternative meanings which have been suggested are Fert-in meaning "The Small Tumulus" or 'The Grave Point or Portion'. The earliest surviving mention of the townland name is in the Cavan Poll Book of 1761, which spells it as Fartrin. Leets Directory of 1814 spells it as Fartren and an 1830 sketch map spells it as Farterum.

== Geography ==
It is bounded on the north by Slievebrickan townland, on the east by Cloncollow and Mullynagolman townlands, on the south by Aghaweenagh and Clontygrigny townlands and on the west by Killarah and Agharaskilly townlands. Its chief geographical features are Togher Lough on its eastern boundary and several small drumlin hills reaching to 200 feet (61 m) above sea-level. Fartrin is traversed by the Killeshandra road, the Bellaheady road and some minor lanes. The townland covers 280 acres (1.1 km^{2}) statute, including 10 acres (40,000 m^{2}) of water.

== History ==
In the Ulster Plantation Fartrin formed one of the two polls of Agharaskilly.

In a grant dated 10 August 1607 from King James I to Sir Garret Moore, 1st Viscount Moore of Mellifont, the townland was described as the farm, termon or hospital of Aghcrossekille containing 2 polls at an annual rent of 6 ½ shillings. The two polls now form the two modern townlands of Agharaskilly and Fartrin. It therefore must have been regarded as belonging to Tomregan Church. However, in the Ulster Plantation of 1609, Agharaskilly it is depicted on the Baronial Map as a separate townland from the Tomregan Church lands.

On the death of Thomas Moigne, the Protestant Bishop of Kilmore, on 1 January 1629, Sir Edward Bagshaw of Finglas, County Dublin owner of the Manor of Castle Bagshawe, Belturbet then took adverse possession of Agharaskilly. William Bedell, who succeeded Moigne as Bishop of Kilmore disputed this act of Bagshaw's. Bedell petitioned Lord Viscount Falkland, The Lord Deputy of Ireland in August 1629 as follows: Sir Edward Bagshaw, Knight, since the death of the late bishop, in the vacancy of the said sees hath entered upon two poles of land called Agarosikilly, parcel of the Termon of the see of Kilmore, whereof your petitioner's predecessor died seised. Your Petitioner humbly prayeth that he may be restored to the possession of the said lands enjoyed by his predecessor, and kept in the same, till the said Sir Edward Bagshaw shall show reason to the contrary to this Board.

However Bedell's suit either must have failed or the intervening 1641 Rebellion prevented it continuing because we find on 28 May 1654 Sir Edward Bagshaw gave the townland to his daughter Anne as part of her dowry on her marriage to Thomas Richardson of Dublin, son of John Richardson, Bishop of Ardagh (1580–1654). By a deed dated 30 April 1661 Thomas Richardson granted Aghacrossikilley alias Aghacrussacully to Captain Thomas Gwyllym, the landlord of Ballyconnell and ever since it has been passed down with the Ballyconnell estate.

In the Cavan Poll Book of 1761, there were three people registered to vote in Fartrin in the Irish general election, 1761: Andrew Higginbottom, Patrick Seaman and Samuel Seaman. They were each entitled to cast two votes. The four election candidates were Charles Coote, 1st Earl of Bellomont and Lord Newtownbutler (later Brinsley Butler, 2nd Earl of Lanesborough), both of whom were then elected Member of Parliament for Cavan County. The losing candidates were George Montgomery (MP) of Ballyconnell and Barry Maxwell, 1st Earl of Farnham. Absence from the poll book either meant a resident did not vote or, more likely, was not a freeholder entitled to vote, which would mean most of the inhabitants of Fartrin.

The Tithe Applotment Books for 1827 list the following tithepayers in the townland- Early, McKernan, McPartland, Gillece, Smyth, Reilly, Maxwell, Halliday, McGuire, O'Donnell.

The Ordnance Survey Name Books for 1836 give the following description of the townland-Fardruim, 'external ridge, outer hill. South-east of parish. Property of Major Bailey. No land-agent. Rent 20 shillings to £2 per arable acre. Soil gravelly. Produces wheat, oats, rye and potatoes. Poor natives. Road from Ballyconnell to Killeshandra.

The Fartrin Valuation Office Field books are available for December 1838.

Griffith's Valuation of 1857 lists the landlords of the townland as Major J.Bayley and Jones & the tenants as Bayley, Smith, Donohoe, Reilly, O'Donnell, Galeese, Murphy, Halliday, Gately, Coaboy, Early and McGinn.

== Census ==
Year	Population	Males	Females	Total Houses	Uninhabited
1841	105	49	56	17	0
1851	83	37	46	17	0
1861	80	32	48	17	1
1871	62	29	33	14	0
1881	52	27	25	13	0
1891	50	25	25	12	0

In the 1901 census of Ireland, there are twelve families listed in the townland.

In the 1911 census of Ireland, there are eleven families listed in the townland.

== Antiquities ==
There are no historic sites in the townland apart from a prehistoric dug-out canoe buried under several feet of bog which was discovered in the 1940s by men cutting turf in Fartrin Bog. However the townland is an important area of ecological interest. Due to parts of it being low-lying it was once the bed of a lake and many shells and fossils litter the ground. The habitat supports a rich variety of rare wildlife and plants, including lizards, dragonflies and bogmoss (Sphagnum Imbricatum and Sphagnum austinii Sull. ex Aust.)
