= Bricín =

Irish abbot

Saint Bricín (c. 590–650; also known as Bricin, Briccine, DaBreccoc, Da-Breccocus) was an Irish abbot of Tuaim Dreccon in Breifne (modern Tomregan, County Cavan), a monastery that flourished in the 7th century.

== Túaim Dreccon ==
The history of Bricín centres on the abbey of Túaim Dreccon in the Bréifne territory. The Gaelic place name meant "tumulus (burial mound) of Dreacon", referring to a pre-Christian chieftain who ruled the district around the Woodford river.

In early Christian times, Tuaim Dreccon was the site of a monastic school. Investigations by the Breffni Antiquarian and Historical Society show that the present townland of Mullynagolman (located about two miles southeast of Ballyconnell) corresponds to the original site. All traces of the building have disappeared, as have any remnants of the mound of Dreacon.

== Bricín and Cenn Fáelad ==
In the early years of the 7th century, Bricin was attached to this scholarly establishment, distinguishing himself as a scholar and surgeon.

His most distinguished surgical achievement relates to his care of a serious skull wound on an Ulster noble of royal blood named Cenn Fáelad mac Aillila. Following the Battle of Magh Rath fought near Moira, County Down in 636 AD, the wounded Cenn Fáelad was rushed to Bricín at Tomregan for treatment. After surgery, Cennfaelad remained at the academy for a period of convalescence under Bricín's care. As a result, Cenn Fáelad developed an almost perfect memory and a keen interest in study at the three colleges of the university—Brehon Law, History and Poetry, and Classical Learning—going on to become its most distinguished scholar and poet. Following his studies Cenn Fáelad produced three famous works, on law, Irish grammar and history, which include references to exploits of the Ulster Red Branch Knights.

A Romanesque sculpture depicting Bricin performing the operation on Cenn Fáelad still survives from the medieval church of Tomregan.

== Baile Bricín ==
In a later Millennium Prophecy called Baile Bricín, he is stated to be in his house at Tomregan when he receives a vision.

Regarding Saint Bricin's later years, he would seem to have left Ireland for missionary work in Scotland according to a dubious entry in the Félire Óengusso but it may have confused him with another saint of the same name. The Scottish Kalendar of Drummond has the following entry for 4 September: "Apud Hiberniam natale sanctorum confessorum Bulaig et Bricin". The personal name Maolbhricin or Mael Bricín, Mal Bricín, Maíl Bricín (meaning 'Servant of Bricin') occurs in medieval Scottish records so it may indicate traces of a Bricin cult there.

Bricin, like Saint Patrick, seems to have become a saint by popular canonisation. He is mentioned in the Book of Fenagh, page 412, as being a companion of Saint Caillin of Fenagh, County Leitrim, which indicates that he was venerated at the time of the original composition of the Book of Fenagh.

He is also mentioned in the Life of Saint Naile of Kinawley, County Fermanagh, which again indicates his veneration at the time of the composition of that Life.

== Commemoration ==
The Félire Óengusso records his feast day on 5 September but the earlier Martyrology of Tallaght records it as 9 May. The mistake probably arose in copying, when 9/5 would have been miscopied as 5/9. Bricin's name survives in local place-names like Slievebrickan ("Bricin's mountain"), a townland west of Mullynagolman. This indicates that in earlier times, his name and fame were well-remembered in the district.

The vocational school in Belturbet, County Cavan is called St. Bricin's VEC. The Irish Military Hospital is named in his honour, St Bricin's Military Hospital.
