= Slievebrickan =

Townland in Carn, County Cavan, Ireland

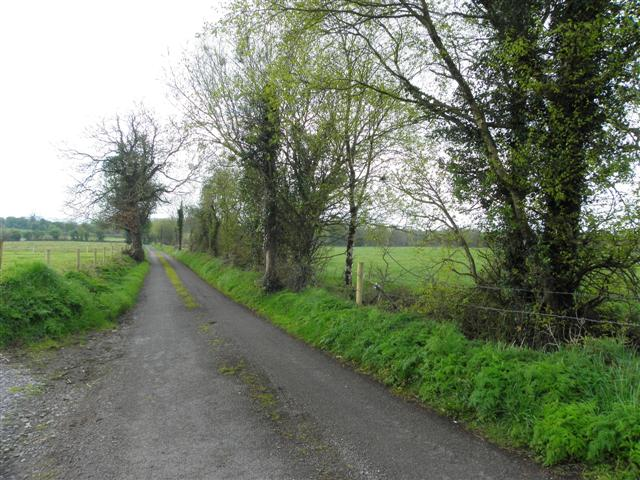
Road at Slievebrickan townland, Tomregan, County Cavan, Ireland, heading SSE.

Slievebrickan is a townland in the Parish of Tomregan, Barony of Loughtee Lower, County Cavan, Ireland.

== Etymology ==
The townland name is an anglicisation of the Gaelic placename Sliabh Bricín which means 'The Hill of Saint Bricín'. It derives its name from St. Bricín who was the abbot of Tomregan University in 637 AD which was in the nearby townland of Mullynagolman. The oldest surviving mention of the name is in a patent of King James I dated 7 July 1613 (Pat. 11 James I – LXXI – 38), where it is spelled Slewbricken.

== Geography ==
It is bounded on the north & west by Agharaskilly townland, on the east by Cloncollow townland, on the south by Fartrin townland. Its chief geographical feature is a drumlin hill reaching to 235 feet above sea-level. Slievebrickan is traversed by the Killeshandra Road and Slievebrickan Lane. The townland covers 132 statute acres.

== History ==
In the 1609 Plantation of Ulster, Slievebrickan formed part of lands which were granted to John Sandford of Castle Doe, Co. Donegal by letters patent dated 7 July 1613 (Pat. 11 James I – LXXI – 38, Slewbricken). It was later sold by Sandford to his wife's uncle Toby Caulfeild, 1st Baron Caulfeild, Master of the Ordnance and Caulfield had the sale confirmed by letters patent of 12 July 1620 (Pat. 19 James I. XI. 45 Slewbreckin). Coincidentally the townland was later part owned by John Sandford's daughter, Magdalen Gwyllym the wife of Thomas Gwyllym, the owner of the Ballyconnell estate.

Ambrose Leet's 1814 Directory spells the name as Slubrickan.

The Tithe Applotment Books for 1827 list the following tithepayers in the townland- Donahy, Wynne.

The Ordnance Survey Name Books for 1836 give the following description of the townland-Slievebrickan. Brecon's mountain. South-west of parish. Property of Mr. Bailey. Rent 16 shillings per arable acre. Soil poor. 18 acres of bog. Good road. Stone houses. Poor natives.

The Slievebrickan Valuation Office Field books are available for December 1838.

Griffith's Valuation of 1857 lists the landlords of the townland as Jones, Griffith and Donohoe & the tenants as Wynne, Donohoe and Griffith.

== Census ==
| Year | Population | Males | Females | Total Houses | Uninhabited |
|---|---|---|---|---|---|
| 1841 | 19 | 8 | 11 | 3 | 0 |
| 1851 | 19 | 9 | 10 | 4 | 0 |
| 1861 | 18 | 12 | 6 | 3 | 0 |
| 1871 | 15 | 9 | 6 | 3 | 0 |
| 1881 | 19 | 11 | 8 | 3 | 0 |
| 1891 | 12 | 7 | 5 | 3 | 1 |

In the 1901 census of Ireland, there are two families listed in the townland.

In the 1911 census of Ireland, there are five families listed in the townland.

== Antiquities ==
1. A medieval earthen ringfort on the east side of the Killeshandra Road (Site number 1110, page 137, Slievebrickan townland, in "Archaeological Inventory of County Cavan", Patrick O’Donovan, 1995 where it is described as- Raised circular area (int. diam. 25.8m) enclosed by a low earthen bank. An earlier report (OPW 1969) suggested that the original entrance may have been at SSW.)
2. A Penal Law Mass Rock and an upright Standing Stone reputed to have been blessed by Saint Patrick on his visit to the parish in 435 AD. A description of the antiquities in the townland in 1938 is found in the Dúchas Schools' Collection.
