= Aghaweenagh =

Townland in Ireland

Coordinates: 54.075°N 7.581°W

Aghaweenagh (Irish derived place name, either Achadh an Bhuí Eanaigh meaning 'The Field of the Yellow Bog' or Achadh Mhuimhneach meaning 'The Field of the Munstermen'.) is a townland in the civil parish of Kildallan, barony of Tullyhunco, County Cavan, Ireland.

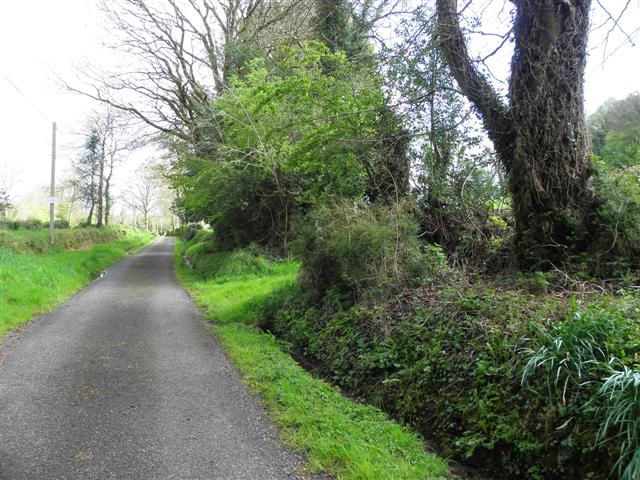
Lane, Aghaweenagh (geograph 2914377)

== Geography ==
Aghaweenagh is bounded on the west by Clontygrigny townland, on the east by Berrymount and Killygreagh townlands, on the south by Ardlougher townland and on the north by Fartrin and Mullynagolman townlands. Its chief geographical features are Togher Lough, Greenville Lough, the Rag River, small streams, forestry plantations, a dug well and spring wells. Aghaweenagh is traversed by minor public roads and rural lanes. The townland covers 375 acres, including 16 acres of water. Until the 18th century the townland of Callaghs formed a sub-division of Aghaweenagh.

== History ==
A 1587 petition spell the name as Aghewehan. The 1609 Plantation of Ulster Baronial map depicts the townland as split into two parts Teyriah (Irish derived place name, probably Tuath Riabhach meaning the Grey-Striped Land) and Mollachsifine. A Plantation of Ulster grant dated 1611 spells the names as Owtony otherwise Tewreagh and Mullaghsiffin. A 1624 inquisition spells the name as Aghewynaghe otherwise Tevereoghe. The 1641 Depositions spell the townland as Aighavenaigh and Aighaveny. The 1652 Commonwealth Survey spells the townland as Aghoinagh. The 1665 Down Survey map depicts it as Aughweenah and Aughwenagh. William Petty's map of 1685 depicts it as Aghwonod and Aghwonoh and Aghweengh.

From medieval times up to the early 1600s, the land belonged to the McKiernan Clan. On 7 November 1587 John McKiernan, the under-sheriff of County Westmeath, a native of Aghaweenagh, petitioned the government to appoint him the seneschal of Tullyhunco in order to civilise the natives.

Nov. 7. 4. Petition of John Kernan to Burghley. Humbly beseecheth your honourable Lordship, your orator, John Kernan, of Aghewehan, in the territory or cantred of Tolconchoe, alias M'Kernan's country, in the county of the Cavan, within the realm of Ireland, that it may please your Lordship with your favour to further his petition to Her Majesty for the grant of the reversion of the office of Clerk of Common Pleas in the Exchequer for his life, and of the seneschalship of the said cantred to him and to his heirs males of his body, in consideration of his endeavours in Her Majesty's service in the government of Sir William Fytzwylliams, Arthur Lord Grey, and the Lords Justices [Loftus and Wallop], and the rather that your said orator, through the entreaty of his kinsmen, the inhabitants of the said cantred, has left the English Pale to dwell among them, hoping, if convenient countenance be afforded to him by the said grant, to bring them, through dutiful exhortation, and examples of husbandry and other civil trades, from their disorders and disobedience to the due regard of loyalty and obedience. Your said orator presenteth unto your honourable Lordship the opinion and testimony of the Lord Grey and Sir William Fytzwylliams touching your orator by their several letters unto Mr. Secretary Walsyngham, being required so to do by his Honour, at his last being at the Court, since which time your orator hath dutifully attended your Honours and the other Lords of Her Majesty's most honourable Council for Her Majesty's most gracious pleasure in his said suit, and yet some seeking the disgrace of your orator have rumoured that he is suitor for the seneschalship of Meath and Westmeath long since, with the liberty and jurisdiction palatine of the said counties determined and annulled by parliament. Your orator's poor suit is none other than as hereby is declared, a matter of small profit to your orator and less charge to Her Majesty, and in regard thereof moved rather than anything more chargeable to Her Highness, whereof your orator hopeth that your Honour in your grave judgment will think him worthy.

John McKiernan was granted the position by Fiant No. 5156 on 20 March 1588

Grant to John Kearnan, gent; of the office of seneschal of the territory of Upper Talconchoe alias M’Kearnans country in co. Cavan. To hold during good behavior, with all accustomed profits. With power to raise the inhabitants, and command them for defence of the territory, the public weal of the inhabitants, and the punishment of malefactors; to prosecute, banish, and punish by all means malefactors, rebels, vagabonds, rymors, Irish harpers, bards, bentules, carrowes, idle men and women, and those who assist such; and twice a year within a month after Easter and Michaelmas respectively to hold a court and law day. He shall not take any unlawful Irish exactions from the inhabitants, as to cess them with kern, nor impose coney or livery, without direction of the Lord Deputy.

At the beginning of the 17th century, Aghaweenagh belonged to Donald McKiernan, the son of Farrell Oge McKiernan. In an inquisition held at Cavan on 25 September 1609, one of the jurors was the said Donell McFerrall oge McKernan. In the Plantation of Ulster by grant dated 4 June 1611, King James VI and I granted part of Aghaweenagh containing 2 plowlands or 100 acres in Tewreagh otherwise Owtony to Donell mac Farrall Oge McKernan, gentleman, at an annual rent of £1-1s-4d. An inquisition held at Cavan on 21 October 1624 stated that- Donald mac Ferrall Oge McKiernan, late of Tevereoghe alias Aghewynaghe in County Cavan was seised of two polls of land called Tevereoghe alias Aghewynaghe. He died 1 March 1623. John McKiernan, his son and heir, was then aged 15 years old and unmarried.

In the Plantation of Ulster by grant dated 27 February 1610, along with other lands, King James VI and I granted one poll of Mullaghsiffin to William O'Shereden, gentleman, Cheefe of his Name. William Sheridan was the chief of the Sheridan Clan in County Cavan. He was the son of the previous chief, Hugh Duff O'Sheridan of Togher townland, Kilmore parish, County Cavan. William was the ancestor of the famous Sheridan theatrical family. William died sometime before 1638 leaving two sons, Owen (of Mullaghmore, Tullyhunco townland, Kildallan parish) and Patrick (of Raleagh townland, Kildallan parish). Owen Sheridan succeeded to his father's lands and this was confirmed by a grant to him by Charles I of England dated 6 March 1637. Owen's son Denis was born in 1612 and became a Catholic priest in charge of Kildrumferton parish, County Cavan. He later converted to Protestantism and on 10 June 1634 William Bedell, the Protestant Bishop of Kilmore, ordained him as a Minister of the Church of Ireland and two days later Denis was collated to the Vicarage of Killasser in the Diocese of Kilmore. Denis had several children, including William Sheridan (Bishop of Kilmore and Ardagh) 1682-1691 (his son Donald kept up the Templeport connection by marrying Mrs Enery of Bawnboy); Patrick Sheridan, Cloyne, Protestant Bishop of Cloyne (1679-1682) and Sir Thomas Sheridan (politician) Chief Secretary of State for Ireland (1687-1688).

The aforesaid Owen Sheridan took part in the Irish Rebellion of 1641. At Cavan, on 26 July 1642, Thomas Jones and his son William Jones stated- The Complaynt of William Jones gent. and Tho: Jones, his father, of Cornecrom in the County of Cavan, gent. sayth sworne & examined saith that on the seavententh of November last 1641 there came unto the habitacion of the deponent William Jones, [Weny] Sheridan of Molloughmore, Ffarrell mac Donell mac Ffarrell Oge McKernan of Aighavenaigh, Donell Oge McKernan of same and their nephew, which was freehoulders of the foresaid Aighavenaigh and violently with other assistants tooke away from the complayneant William Jones, fiftye English cowes price 125 li. ster, ten heffers 20 li. ster, eight yeare-olds 4 li. ster, five horsses and mares 10 li. ster, in corne & hay 40 li sterling, in apparell and househould stuffe 30 li. ster, all which sume amountinge to were worth 229 li. ster and sayd when they tooke away the foresaid goods that the said William Jones, the Complayneant, was a traytor and bade him goe for his Country England & further sayth mee And further theis deponents say that the parties mencioned in a note or scedule hereunto annexed are or were lately actors in the present Rebellion & bore and carryed armes with and for the Rebells against the Protestants whom they robbed and dispoyled of their goodes & did other outrages are theis vizt Tho: Jones Will: Jones Deposed July 26, 1642.

In the Plantation of Ulster by grant dated 16 August 1611, King James VI and I granted, inter alia, part of Aghaweenagh to Thomas Jones-1 poll in Tewrevy to Thomas Johnes, gentleman. At Cavan, on 26 July 1642, The aforesaid Thomas Jones and his son William Jones gave the names of rebel leaders in the Cavan Irish Rebellion of 1641, including Farrell McKernan of Aighavenaigh, Donell Oge McKernan of same, Farrell Rely of same, Farrell mac Donough mac Une McKernan of same, James mac Donough mac Une McKernan of same, Une mac Donough McKernan of same, Owen mac Edmond mac Torlaigh McKernan of same, Bryan McEllpatricke of same. They also stated- The Complaynt of William Jones gent. and Tho: Jones, his father, of Cornecrom in the County of Cavan, gent. sayth sworne & examined saith that on the seavententh of November last 1641 there came unto the habitacion of the deponent William Jones, [Weny] Sheridan of Molloughmore, Ffarrell mac Donell mac Ffarrell Oge McKernan of Aighavenaigh, Donell Oge McKernan of same and their nephew, which was freehoulders of the foresaid Aighavenaigh and violently with other assistants tooke away from the complayneant William Jones, fiftye English cowes price 125 li. ster, ten heffers 20 li. ster, eight yeare-olds 4 li. ster, five horsses and mares 10 li. ster, in corne & hay 40 li sterling, in apparell and househould stuffe 30 li. ster, all which sume amountinge to were worth 229 li. ster and sayd when they tooke away the foresaid goods that the said William Jones, the Complayneant, was a traytor and bade him goe for his Country England & further sayth mee And further theis deponents say that the parties mencioned in a note or schedule hereunto annexed are or were lately actors in the present Rebellion & bore and carryed armes with and for the Rebells against the Protestants whom they robbed and dispoyled of their goodes & did other outrages are theis vizt Tho: Jones Will: Jones Deposed July 26, 1642. In a further deposition dated 26 July 1642, the said Thomas Jones of Drumminnion, Kildallan parish stated- that on the 17th of November 1641 the deponent Thomas Jones by the procurement of Phillip mac Hugh mac Shane Rely, Edmond Rely, Hugh mac Shane mac Phillip Rely and Hugh mac Molmore Rely, was robbed by Patt Sheridan of Rillaigh, Donell Oge McKernan and his nephew heire of Aighaveny, Laighlen Oge O'Rorke de Killnemarue and Bryan O'Rorke of the same, of the goods following, viz. eightene melch Cowes price 36 li. ster, six heffers in calfe, six pownds sterling; three yearelings 30 s. sterling, foure horsses 12 li. sterling, Corne & hay price 4 0li. sterling, in ready mony x li. 10 s. sterling, in househould stuffe as plate pewter brasse, lynen wollen beddinge and apparell with other necessaries 40 li. sterling, in proffitts of lands per annum in the said County 16 li. sterling,.

After the Irish Rebellion of 1641 concluded, the townland was confiscated from the McKiernans and Sheridans in the Cromwellian Settlement and the 1652 Commonwealth Survey lists it as belonging to James Thornton. A confirming grant dated 30 January 1668 from King Charles II of England to James Thornton included 156 acres and 6 perches in Aghweenagh. A grant dated 9 September 1669 from King Charles II of England to Arthur Annesley, 1st Earl of Anglesey included, inter alia, part of Aughweenagh containing 71 acres and one rood at an annual rent of £0-19s-1 1/2d. The townland remained as part of the estate of the Thorntons of Greenville House, Aghaweenagh until 5 September 1863 when they were sold. Greenville House was described in the sale advert as- On this Property there is a large, substantial, and modern built house, with suitable Offices, and walled-in Garden, fit for the residence of a Gentleman's family; also a handsome Demesne, well planted with useful and ornamental Timber of full growth. The Thornton estate papers are now in Cavan Archives Service and those papers mentioning Aghaweenagh are at reference numbers P016/005; P016/006 and P016/018. In the Hearth Money Rolls compiled on 29 September 1663, there was one Hearth Tax payer in Aghowynagh- William Soath.

A Lease dated 1 October 1731 for two poles of Achaweenagh, Parish of Killdallan, Co. Cavan was made between James Thornton, Achaweenagh, Co. Cavan and Luke Standford of Belturbett. Witnessed by Daniel Winslow of Derrymore, Co. Fermanagh and Robert Stanford of Belturbett.

In the Cavan Poll Book of 1761, there was one person registered to vote in Aghaweenagh in the Irish general election, 1761 - Abraham Brown. He was entitled to cast two votes. The four election candidates were Charles Coote, 1st Earl of Bellomont and Lord Newtownbutler (later Brinsley Butler, 2nd Earl of Lanesborough), both of whom were then elected Member of Parliament for Cavan County. The losing candidates were George Montgomery (MP) of Ballyconnell and Barry Maxwell, 1st Earl of Farnham. Absence from the poll book either meant a resident did not vote or more likely was not a freeholder entitled to vote, which would mean most of the inhabitants of Aghaweenagh.

The 1790 Cavan Carvaghs list spells the name as Aghuenagh.

The Tithe Applotment Books 1823-1837 list five tithepayers in the townland. and

The Aghaweenagh Valuation Office books are available for 1838.

Griffith's Valuation of 1857 lists eleven landholders in the townland.

In 1863, the townland of Aghaweenagh was sold by the Thornton estate to Lord Charles Beresford, who subsequently sold it on 5 July 1870. The 1870 sale advertisement described the property as Lot No. 4, comprising 375 acres, 0 roods, and 38 perches in Aghaweenagh, along with portions of Killygreagh and Ardlogher. The lot included the Greenville estate, which featured a residential house, outbuildings, a walled garden, and timber grounds. The property was situated near the Ardlogher post office, within proximity to railway connections and the market towns of Ballyconnell, Killeshandra, and Belturbet. The lot also contained a turf bog and commercial timber.

The 1938 Dúchas folklore collection mentions a treasure hunt by Mr. Berry from Greenville c.1740.

== Census ==
Year	Population	Males	Females	Total Houses	Uninhabited
1841	53	24	29	6	0
1851	36	15	21	6	1
1861	37	19	18	7	0
1871	35	20	15	7	1
1881	46	28	18	6	1
1891	38	17	21	7	1

In the 1901 census of Ireland, there are eight families listed in the townland.

In the 1911 census of Ireland, there are eleven families listed in the townland.

== Antiquities ==
1. Greenville House.
