= Breandrum, Tullyhunco =

Townland in County Cavan, Ireland

Breandrum (Irish derived place name, either Brea an Droim meaning 'The Fine Hill-Ridge' or Bréan Droim meaning 'The Filthy Hill-Ridge'.) is a townland in the civil parish of Kildallan, barony of Tullyhunco, County Cavan, Ireland.

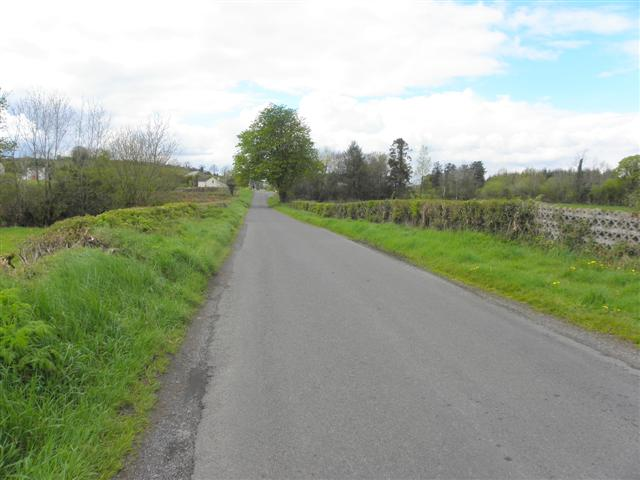
Road at Breandrum (geograph 2915583)

== Geography ==
Breandrum is bounded on the east by Carn, Tullyhunco townland, on the west by Berrymount, Clifton, County Cavan and Killygreagh townlands and on the north by Aghavoher townland. Its chief geographical features are a quarry, a spring well and a dug well. Breandrum is traversed by minor public roads and rural lanes. The townland covers 63 acres.

== History ==
Up until the 19th century, Breandrum formed part of the townland of Killygreagh and its history is the same until then.

The 1825 Tithe Applotment Books list four tithepayers in the townland.

In 1832 one person in Brendrum was registered as a keeper of weapons- Phill Kiernan, who had one gun.

The Breandrum Valuation Office books are available for April 1838.

Griffith's Valuation of 1857 lists three landholders in the townland.

In the 19th century Breandrum was owned by Captain Bedel Stanford. The Stanford Estate papers are in the National Archives of Ireland.

== Census ==
Year	Population	Males	Females	Total Houses	Uninhabited
1841	37	15	22	4	0
1851	21	12	9	3	0
1861	14	6	8	3	0
1871	17	9	8	3	0
1881	12	6	6	3	0
1891	13	9	4	3	0

In the 1901 census of Ireland, there are three families listed in the townland.

In the 1911 census of Ireland, there are four families listed in the townland.
