= Baile Bricín =

Baile Bricín ("The Vision of Bricín") is a late Old Irish or Middle Irish prose tale, in which St Bricín(e), abbot of Túaim Dreccon (Tomregan), is visited by an angel, who reveals to him the names of the most important future Irish churchmen. The text can be regarded as an ecclesiastical counterpart to Baile in Scáil, which provided a model for the structure of the tale and which is referred to in § 58.

== Summary ==
One night, Bricín of Túaim Dreccon heard the noise of an Easter celebration in heaven and asked God for any news. An angel descended from heaven and revealed to him the names of the most famous future churchmen in Ireland as well as the outlines of Bricín's future career. Most of the text is occupied by this list, which includes a variety of details about the clerics in question. The text ends with a brief note on St Patrick's intervention for the Irish on Judgment Day.

== Manuscripts ==
- London, British Library, Harley MS 5280, fols. 44b–48a.
- London, British Library, Egerton MS 1782, fols. 17a–19a.

== Edition ==
- Meyer, Kuno (ed.). "Baile Bricín." Zeitschrift für celtische Philologie 9 (1913): 449–57. Edition available from CELT
