= Cloncollow =

Townland in County Cavan, Ireland

Cloncollow (Irish: Cluain Colbhaigh, IPA: [ˌklˠuənʲ ˈkɔlˠəwiː]) is a townland in the Parish of Tomregan, Barony of Loughtee Lower, County Cavan, Ireland.

== Etymology ==
The townland name is an anglicisation of the Gaelic placename Cluain Colbhaigh which means 'Calva's Meadow'. Alternative meanings are Cluain Colbha meaning 'The border meadow' or Cluain Calmhagh meaning "The meadow in the narrow plain". The oldest surviving mention of the name is in the 1790 Cavan Carvaghs list which spells the name as Cloncallow.

== Geography ==
It is bounded on the north by Cavanagh (townland) and Agharaskilly townlands, on the east by Carrigan & Mullynagolman townlands, on the south by Togher Lough and on the west by Fartrin & Slievebrickan townlands. Its chief geographical features are Togher Lough, Lough Rud, the Rag River connecting the two Loughs and a drumlin hill reaching to 238 feet (73 m) above sea-level. Cloncollow is traversed by Slievebrickan lane. The townland covers 140 statute acres, including 6 acres (24,000 m^{2}) of water.

== History ==
Cloncollow formed part of the termon lands belonging to Tomregan Roman Catholic Church which were granted to the Protestant Bishop of Kilmore in 1610 as part of the Plantation of Ulster. By a lease dated 6 April 1612 the said bishop granted the lands to Sir Oliver Lambart of Kilbeggan, County Westmeath and Sir Garret Moore, 1st Viscount Moore of Mellifont, County Louth. On 17 July 1639 the bishop re-granted the lands to Charles Lambart, 1st Earl of Cavan. In the 1740s the bishop leased the land to John Jones for 21 years. This lease was renewed to his descendant John Copeland Jones on 20 May 1843. In the 1860s the holder of the lease was David Fielding Jones.

Ambrose Leet's 1814 Directory spells the name as Clencollow.

The Tithe Applotment Books for 1827 list the following tithepayers in the townland- Best, Banot, Neil, Graham, Morton, Brady.

The Ordnance Survey Name Books for 1836 give the following description of the townland- Cluain Calbhaigh, 'Calvagh's lawn or meadow'. Lies in the South of the parish. Bishop's land. Held on lease by Miss Davis. Land agent is Mr. R. Paterson, Killyshandra. Lease rent 32 shillings & 6d per arable acre. The county cess rate is 3 shillings. The tithe is 10d. The tenants are Protestants. The soil produces oats, potatoes and barley.

The Cloncollow Valuation Office Field books are available for December 1838.

Griffith's Valuation of 1857 lists the landlord of the townland as Davis & the tenants as Morton, Lee, Best, Berry and Davis.

== Census ==
Year	Population	Males	Females	Total Houses	Uninhabited
1841	44	27	17	8	0
1851	44	18	26	6	0
1861	29	15	14	6	1
1871	30	18	12	6	0
1881	37	20	17	5	0
1891	33	14	19	5	0

In the 1901 census of Ireland, there are five families listed in the townland.

In the 1911 census of Ireland, there are eight families listed in the townland.

== Antiquities ==
1. A medieval Togher or causeway at the Rag River outlet of Togher Lake (Site number 176, page 33, Cloncollow/Mullynagolman townland, "Archaeological Inventory of County Cavan", Patrick O’Donovan, 1995, where it is described as- Marked 'Togher Br.' on OS 1836 and 1876 eds. A modern concrete bridge now spans 'The Rag River' at this location).
