= Ardlougher =

Townland in Bilberry, County Cavan, Ireland

Coordinates: 54°04′N 7°35′W

Ardlougher (from Irish Ard Luachar, meaning 'rushy height') is a townland in the civil parish of Kildallan, barony of Tullyhunco, County Cavan, Ireland.

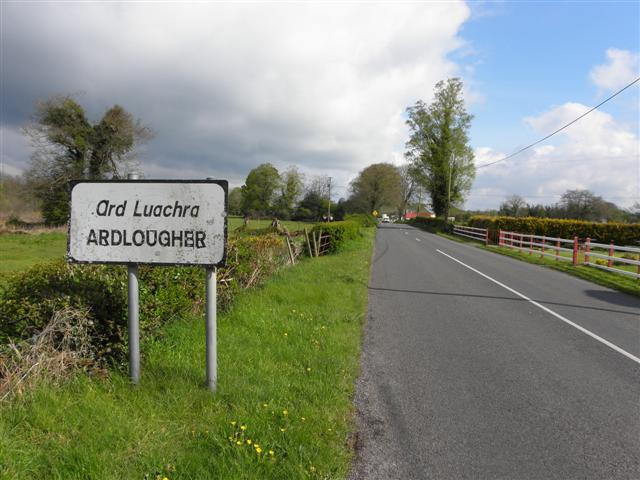
Ard Luachra (Ardlougher) (geograph 2914387)

== Geography ==
Ardlougher is bounded on the west by Clontygrigny townland, on the east by Kildallan townland, on the south by Dring townland and on the north by Aghaweenagh and Killygreagh townlands. Its chief geographical features are the Rag River, small streams, forestry plantations and dug wells. Ardlougher is traversed by minor public roads and rural lanes. The townland covers 141 acres.

== Public transport ==
Bus Éireann route 465 connects Ardlougher to Cavan on Tuesdays only via Killashandra, Arva and Ballinagh.

== History ==
The Ulster Plantation Baronial map of 1609 depicts the name as Ardlogher. The Ulster Plantation grants of 1611 spell the townland name as Ardloagher. A 1615 lease spells the name as Ardlogher. A 1629 inquisition spells the name as Ardlogher. A 1631 grant spells the name as Ardlogher. The 1641 Depositions spell the name as Ardloher. The 1652 Commonwealth Survey spells the townland as Ardlogher. The locals currently pronounce the name Ard-Low-Her.

From medieval times up to the early 1600s, the land belonged to the McKiernan Clan. In the Plantation of Ulster in 1609 the lands of the McKiernans were confiscated, but some were later regranted to them. In the Plantation of Ulster grant dated 4 June 1611, King James VI and I granted 400 acres (160 hectares) or 7 poles (a poll is the local name for townland) of land in Tullyhunco at an annual rent of £4 5s. 4d., to Bryan McKearnan, gentleman, comprising the modern-day townlands of Clontygrigny, Cornacrum, Cornahaia, Derrinlester, Dring, Drumlarah, Ardlougher and Kiltynaskellan. Under the terms of the grant, McKearnan was obliged to build a house on this land. The said Brian 'Bán' Mág Tighearnán (anglicized 'Blonde' Brian McKiernan) was chief of the McKiernan Clan of Tullyhunco, County Cavan, Ireland from 1588 until his death on 4 September 1622. In a visitation by George Carew, 1st Earl of Totnes in autumn 1611, it was recorded, McKyernan removed to his proportion and is about building a house. On 23 March 1615, Mág Tighearnán granted a lease on these lands to James Craig. On 14 March 1630, an Inquisition of King Charles I of England held in Cavan Town stated that Brian bane McKiernan died on 4 September 1622, and his lands comprising seven poles and three pottles in Clonkeen, Clontygrigny, Cornacrum, Derrinlester, Dring, Killygorman, Kiltynaskellan and Mullaghdoo went to his nearest relatives. The most likely inheritors being Cahill, son of Owen McKiernan; Brian, son of Turlough McKiernan and Farrell, son of Phelim McKiernan, all aged over 21 and married. On 26 April 1631 a re-grant was made to Sir James Craige, which included the lands of Ardlogher, which also included sub-divisions in the townland called Lismole, Gortinfadlany, Aghemorelismole, Mullaghnelaroen, Derryvehin, Gatinetunner, Tawnenaltan, Cathrasnea and Boylenane. Sir James Craig died in the siege of Croaghan Castle on 8 April 1642. His land was inherited by his brother John Craig of Craig Castle, County Cavan and of Craigston, County Leitrim, who was chief doctor to both King James I and Charles I.

At Cavan, on 26 July 1642, Thomas and William Jones gave the names of rebel leaders in the Cavan Irish Rebellion of 1641, including Tegg Reaigh McKernan of Ardloher, Hugh Grome McKernan of same, Donell Grana McKernan of same, Conor Crone McKernan of same.

After the Irish Rebellion of 1641 concluded, the rebels vacated the land and the 1652 Commonwealth Survey lists the townland as belonging to Lewis Craig. Lord John Carmichael (b.1710 - d.1787), the 4th Earl of Hyndford of Castle Craig, County Cavan, inherited the lands from the Craig estate. In 1758 Carmichael sold the lands to the Farnham Estate of Cavan. The estate papers are now in the National Library of Ireland and those papers mentioning Ardlougher are at reference numbers MS 41,153 /2 and MS 11,491.

From the 18th century, Ardlougher formed part of the Thornton estate of Greenville, County Cavan. The estate papers are now in Cavan Archives Service and those papers mentioning Kiltynaskellan are at reference numbers P016/005; P016/015; P017/0069 and P017/0099.

The 1790 Cavan Carvaghs list spells the townland name as Ardlogher.

Ambrose Leet's 1814 Directory spells the name as Ardlougher.

The Tithe Applotment Books for 1827 list thirteen tithepayers in the townland.

The Ardlougher Valuation Office books are available for 1838.

On 4 November 1844 a party of armed men attacked the house of Patt Curnien of Adhlogher, from which they carried off a gun.

Griffith's Valuation of 1857 lists fifteen landholders in the townland.

== Census ==
Year	Population	Males	Females	Total Houses	Uninhabited
1841	135	71	64	23	3
1851	75	37	38	17	4
1861	63	34	29	9	0
1871	49	27	22	10	0
1881	31	17	14	9	2
1891	37	19	18	9	0

In the 1901 census of Ireland, there are eighteen families listed in the townland.

In the 1911 census of Ireland, there are ten families listed in the townland.

== Antiquities ==
1. 19th century corn-mill
2. Ardlougher triple-arch stone road bridge, built c.1780.
3. Ardlougher House
4. Ardlougher Cottage
5. Ardlougher Creamery
6. Cattle pound
7. Lime kiln
