= Clifton, County Cavan =

Townland in County Cavan, Ireland

Coordinates: 54°4′50.57″N 7°33′43.88″W

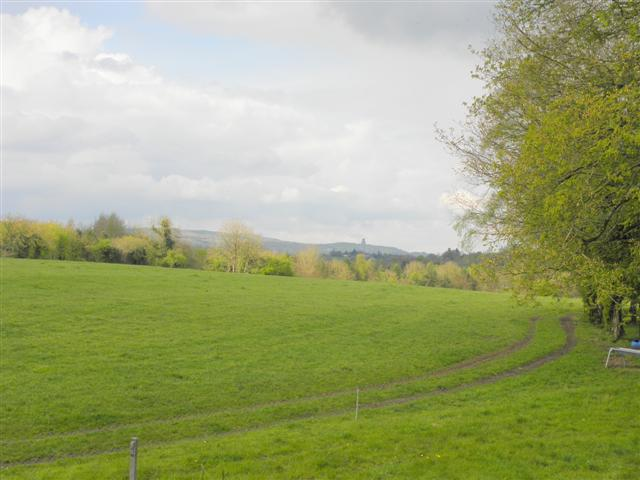
Clifton townland, Tomregan, County Cavan, Ireland, looking NNW in the direction of Carrigan townland.

Clifton is a townland in the Parish of Tomregan, Barony of Loughtee Lower, County Cavan, Ireland.

== Etymology ==
The townland name is an anglicisation of the Gaelic placename Clochán which means "A small beehive-shaped stone house". The 1790 Cavan Carvaghs list spells the name as Cloghan.

== Geography ==
It is bounded on the north and east by Aghavoher townland, on the south by Breandrum, Tullyhunco and Berrymount townlands and on the west by Mullynagolman townland. Its chief geographical features are some small drumlin hills reaching to 300 feet (91 m) above sea-level. Clifton is passed through by Ardlougher lane. The townland covers 82 statute acres.

== History ==
Clifton formed part of the termon lands belonging to Tomregan Roman Catholic Church which were granted to the Protestant Bishop of Kilmore in 1610 as part of the Plantation of Ulster. By a lease dated 6 April 1612 the said bishop granted the lands to Sir Oliver Lambart of Kilbeggan, County Westmeath and Sir Garret Moore, 1st Viscount Moore of Mellifont, County Louth. On 17 July 1639 the bishop re-granted the lands to Charles Lambart, 1st Earl of Cavan. In the 1740s the bishop leased the land to John Jones for 21 years. This lease was renewed to his descendant John Copeland Jones on 20 May 1843. In the 1860s the holder of the lease was David Fielding Jones.

The Tithe Applotment Books for 1827 list the following tithepayers in the townland, who are Berry, Faris, and Pringle.

The Ordnance Survey Name Books for 1836 give the following description of the townland, “Lies in the South of the parish, 3 miles from Ballyconnell. Bishop's land. Held on lease by Jones. Lease rent 5 shillings & 6d per arable acre. The houses are built of mud. The soil produces oats and potatoes.”

The Clifton Valuation Office Field books are available for December 1838.

Griffith's Valuation of 1857 lists the landlord of the townland as Jones and the tenants as Faris, Pringle and Griffith.

== Census ==
Year	Population	Males	Females	Total Houses	Uninhabited
1841	36	16	20	5	0
1851	27	12	15	3	0
1861	24	12	12	3	0
1871	20	12	8	3	0
1881	21	13	8	3	0
1891	15	8	7	3	0

In the 1901 census of Ireland, there are four families listed in the townland.

In the 1911 census of Ireland, there are three families listed in the townland.

== Antiquities ==
1. A Bronze-Age ring-barrow on the border with Aghavoher (Site number 94, page 20, Aghavoher townland, in "Archaeological Inventory of County Cavan", Patrick O’Donovan, 1995, where it is described as “Marked 'Fort' on OS 1836 and 1876 eds. Sited on the S slope of a steep hill. Raised circular area (int. diam. 11.8m) enclosed by a low earthen bank with a wide, deep internal fosse. The internal area is greatly disturbed by a modern field boundary running NNW-SSE which divides the site into two roughly equal portions. Original entrance not recognisable.)”
