= Berrymount =

Townland in County Cavan, Ireland

Coordinates: 54.076377°N 7.569171°W

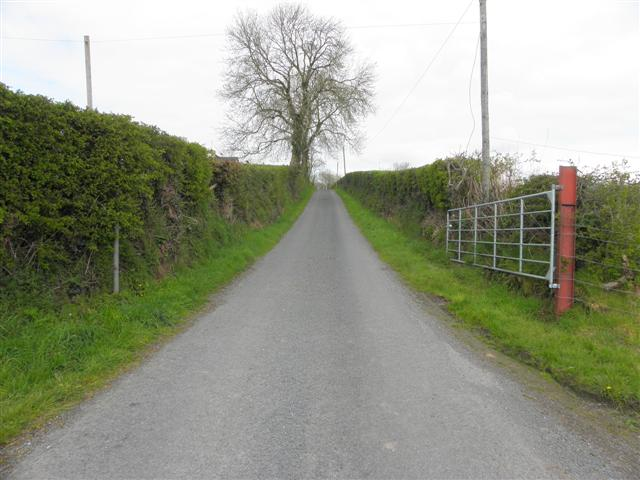
Road at Berrymount townland, Tomregan, County Cavan, Ireland, heading north towards Clifton townland.

Berrymount is a townland in the Parish of Tomregan, Barony of Loughtee Lower, County Cavan, Ireland.

== Etymology ==
The townland name means 'The Hill of James Berry', who took a lease of the land in 1753 and erected a mansion there. The earliest recorded mention of the townland name is in the will of James Berry of Berrymount dated 1793. The older Irish name of the townland was Guberishan which was an anglicisation of the Gaelic placename Gub ar Ros-in, which means 'Headland or Point of the Little Wood'. A marriage settlement dated 15 September 1762 is witnessed by James Barry of Goberrushing and Elizabeth Berry of Goberushin.

== Geography ==
It is bounded on the north by Mullynagolman and Clifton townlands, on the east & south by Breandrum, Tullyhunco and Killygreagh townlands and on the west by Aghaweenagh townland. Its chief geographical features area drumlin hill reaching to 200 feet above sea-level and the Rag River. Berrymount is traversed by Ardlougher lane. The townland covers 134 statute acres. A sub-division of the townland is Featherbed Lane, supposedly named after over-hanging trees on the lane.

== History ==
It formed part of the termon lands belonging to Tomregan Roman Catholic Church which were granted to the Protestant Bishop of Kilmore in 1610 as part of the Plantation of Ulster. By a lease dated 6 April 1612 the said bishop granted the lands to Sir Oliver Lambart of Kilbeggan, County Westmeath and Sir Garret Moore, 1st Viscount Moore of Mellifont, County Louth. On 17 July 1639 the bishop re-granted the lands to Charles Lambart, 1st Earl of Cavan. In the 1740s the bishop leased the land to John Jones for 21 years. This lease was renewed to his descendant John Copeland Jones on 20 May 1843. In 1753 Alexander Faris leased the land to James Berry. A bundle of deeds relating to James Berry's land are in the PRONI. In the 1860s the holder of the lease was David Fielding Jones.

Ambrose Leet's 1814 Directory spells the name as Berry-mount with the resident being James Berry, Esq..

The Tithe Applotment Books for 1827 list only one tithepayer in the townland- James Berry. An affidavit dated 29 January 1827 signed by him in his role as Commissioner of Tithes for Tomregan parish can be viewed at-

In 1833 there was a dispute between Berry and his landlord about payments.

The Ordnance Survey Name Books for 1836 give the following description of the townland- Lies in South-East of the parish. Protestant Bishop's land belonging to the See of Kilmore. Held on lease by J.C. Jones. Land Agent is Mr. Knipe. Rent per arable acre is 5 shillings & 6 pence to the bishop and 5 shillings to Jones. The soil is good and produces wheat, oats, barley and potatoes. The inhabitants are in good circumstances. Berrymount House is the residence of Mr. Berry. A neat house with planting.

The Berrymount Valuation Office Field books are available for December 1838.

A deed dated 28 December 1839 now in the Cavan Archives Service (ref P017/0050) is described as-

Assignment made between Thomas Berry, Rockfield, County Cavan, esquire, and Alexander Berry, Drumany, County Cavan, esquire. Thomas Berry, in consideration of James Berry, his father, having conveyed to him his interest in the lands of Rockfield, Corramahon and Loughnafin, assigns to his brother, Alexander Berry, his interest in the lands of Berrymount otherwise Guberishan, all in the parish of Tomregan, County Cavan. Lands to be held by Alexander Berry from the death of his father forever in pursuance of covenant for perpetual renewal in the original lease for the lands under the see of Kilmore. He covenants to pay to Mary Anne Berry, otherwise Lahy, out of the lands of Berrymount the sum of £10 sterling yearly during her life. Assignment begins by reciting ownership of the property from Thomas Berry, formerly of Rockfield, County Cavan, grandfather to the parties hereto. It is noted that a memorial of the deed was entered at the Registry Office, city of Dublin, on 8 December 1844 in book 20, number 88.

Griffith's Valuation of 1857 lists the landlords of the townland as Jones and Berry & the tenants as Berry, Prophet and McKiernan.

The Irish artist Paul Henry (painter) was descended from the Berry family of Berrymount.

== Census ==
| Year | Population | Males | Females | Total Houses | Uninhabited |
|---|---|---|---|---|---|
| 1841 | 9 | 5 | 4 | 1 | 0 |
| 1851 | 15 | 7 | 8 | 3 | 0 |
| 1861 | 15 | 7 | 8 | 3 | 0 |
| 1871 | 13 | 7 | 6 | 2 | 0 |
| 1881 | 10 | 5 | 5 | 2 | 0 |
| 1891 | 6 | 5 | 1 | 2 | 0 |

In the 1901 census of Ireland, there are four families listed in the townland.

In the 1911 census of Ireland, there are four families listed in the townland.
