= Killygreagh =

Townland in County Cavan, Ireland

Killygreagh (Irish derived place name, Coill an Ghréich meaning 'The Wood of the Bog'.) is a townland in the civil parish of Kildallan, barony of Tullyhunco, County Cavan, Ireland.

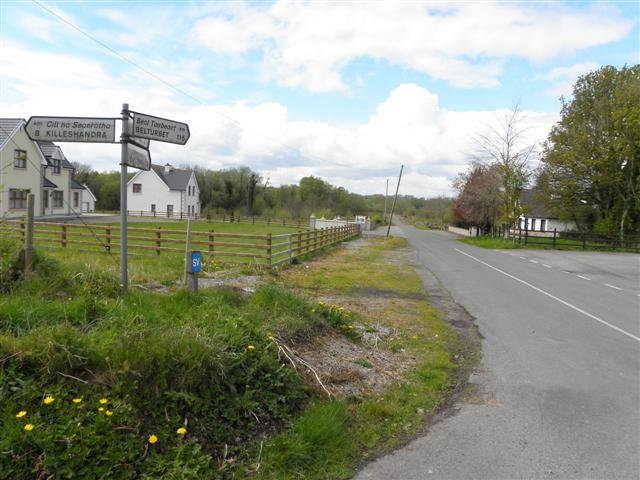
Road at Killygreagh (geograph 2915665)

== Geography ==
Killygreagh is bounded on the east by Breandrum, Tullyhunco, Carn, Tullyhunco and Kildallan townlands, on the west by Aghaweenagh and Ardlougher townlands and on the north by Berrymount townland. Its chief geographical features are the Rag River, small streams, quarries and forestry plantations. Killygreagh is traversed by minor public roads and rural lanes. The townland covers 166 acres.

== History ==
From medieval times up to the early 1600s, the land belonged to the McKiernan Clan.

The 1609 Plantation of Ulster Map depicts the townland as Keilnagraghan. A grant of 1610 spells the name as Kilnegreighan. A lease of 1611 spells the name as Kilnegrahan.

In the Plantation of Ulster King James VI and I by grant dated 27 June 1610, granted the Manor of Keylagh, which included one poll in Kilnegreighan, to John Achmootie, a Scottish Groom of the Bedchamber. His brother Alexander Achmootie was granted the neighbouring Manor of Dromheada. On 16 August 1610 John Aghmootie sold his lands in Tullyhunco to James Craig. On 1 May 1611 James Craig leased, inter alia, 1 poll of Kilnegrahan to Ferrall oge McKernan. On 29 July 1611 Arthur Chichester, 1st Baron Chichester and others reported that John Auchmothy and Alexander Auchmothye have not appeared at the lands awarded to them. James Craige is their deputy for five years, who has brought 4 artificers of divers sorts with their wives and families and 2 other servants. Stone raised for building a mill and trees felled, a walled house with a smith's forge built, 4 horses and mares upon the grounds with competent arms. Sir James Craig died in the siege of Croaghan Castle on 8 April 1642. His land was inherited by his brother John Craig of Craig Castle, County Cavan and of Craigston, County Leitrim, who was chief doctor to both King James I and Charles I.

In the Cavan Poll Book of 1761, there were two people registered to vote in Killygreagh in the Irish general election, 1761 - John Brown and Edward Devinport. They were each entitled to cast two votes. The four election candidates were Charles Coote, 1st Earl of Bellomont and Lord Newtownbutler (later Brinsley Butler, 2nd Earl of Lanesborough), both of whom were then elected Member of Parliament for Cavan County. The losing candidates were George Montgomery (MP) of Ballyconnell and Barry Maxwell, 1st Earl of Farnham. Absence from the poll book either meant a resident did not vote or more likely was not a freeholder entitled to vote, which would mean most of the inhabitants of Killygreagh.

In the lead-up to the Irish Rebellion of 1798, John Faris of Windsor, Ballyconnell, reported to the Chief Secretary for Ireland, Thomas Pelham, 2nd Earl of Chichester, as follows: Stating that upon the information of James Coulter, of Killigreagh, Cooper, the writer has committed Charles Brady of Ballyconnell to Cavan gaol on a charge of treason.

The 1825 Tithe Applotment Books list six tithepayers in the townland.

The Killygreagh Valuation Office books are available for 1838.

Griffith's Valuation of 1857 lists seven landholders in the townland.

In the 19th century Killygreagh was owned by Captain Bedel Stanford. The Stanford Estate papers are in the National Archives of Ireland. Stanford leased 38 acres in Killygreagh to the Thornton Estate. In 1863 this leasehold was sold by the Thornton Estate to Lord Charles Beresford. It was described as-IN THE LANDED ESTATES COURT IRELAND COUNTY OF CAVAN: In the Matter of the Estate of WILLIAM ROBERT THORNTON, Esquire, Owner and Petitioner TO BE SOLD in Lots, on an early day hereafter to be named, the Estate of the late Perrot THORNTON, Esquire, of Greenville, in aid COUNTY OF CAVAN consisting of the Townland of Callaghs, Kiltynaskellan, Roy, Aughaweenagh, Killygreagh, and Ardlogher, situate in the baronies of Tullyhunco and Tullyhaw, and County of Cavan. The Estate contains over 1400 acres statute measure. On this Property there is a large, substantial, and modern built house, with suitable Offices, and walled-in Garden, fit for the residence of a Gentleman's family; also a handsome Demesne, well planted with useful and ornamental Timber of full growth. The Estate is situated midway between Killeshandra and Belturbet. Further particulars will be state in future advertisements. Application to be made to HENRY GREENE KELLY, Solicitor, having carriage of the proceedings, No. 39, Lower Ormand Quay, Dublin. WILLIAM COCHRANE, Esq., Dromard, Clones, County Monaghan, and to MOSES NETTERFIELD, Esq., Agent of the Estate, Ballyconelly, County of Cavan. On 5 July 1870 Beresford sold his part of the townland. Killygreagh was described in the sale advert as- LOT No. 4. A portion of the Townland of Killygreagh containing 38 acres 3 roods and 24 perches statute measure, held under fee-farm grants.

== Census ==
Year	Population	Males	Females	Total Houses	Uninhabited
1841	37	19	18	9	1
1851	38	19	19	9	1
1861	39	17	22	10	1
1871	38	15	23	7	0
1881	28	8	20	7	0
1891	22	9	13	8	1

In the 1901 census of Ireland, there were ten families listed in the townland.

In the 1911 census of Ireland, there were eight families listed in the townland.

== Antiquities ==
1. St. Dallan's Roman Catholic Church.
2. Kildallan Community Centre, formerly Kildallan Roman Catholic Church from 1843 to 1975.
3. Killygreagh House
4. A foot-bridge over the stream
5. A foot-stick over the stream
