= Cavanagh (townland) =

- townland

Irish transcription(s)
  - Derivation: Cabhanach
  - Meaning: "Abounding in hollows"
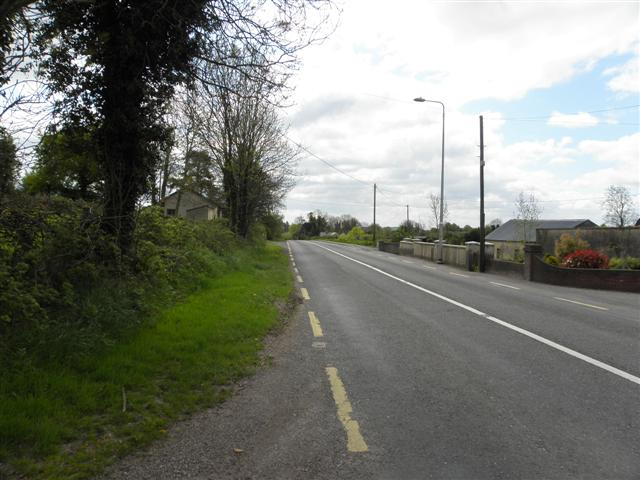
- N87 road at Cavanagh townland, heading south-east

- Cavanagh shown within Republic of Ireland
- Country: Ireland
- County: County Cavan
- Barony: Tullyhaw
- Civil parish: Tomregan
- First recorded: 1609

Area
  - Total: 111 ha (275 acres)

Cavanagh (from Irish Cabhanach, meaning 'abounding in hollows') is a townland in the civil parish of Tomregan, County Cavan, Ireland. It lies within the former barony of Tullyhaw.

== Etymology ==
The townland derives its name from the low-lying areas between its drumlin hills. The oldest surviving mention of the name is in the 1609 Ulster Plantation Baronial map where it is spelled Cavan. A 1610 grant spells it as Cavan. A 1630 Inquisition spells it as Cavan. The 1652 Commonwealth Survey spells the name as Aghtrecavan and Ightercavan (Irish 'Cabhanach Uachtar' and 'Cabhanach Íochtar' meaning Upper Cavanagh and Lower Cavanagh). The 1659 Down Survey map spells it as Caven. A 1666 grant spells it as Cavan alias Caven. William Petty's 1685 map spells it as Caven. The 1790 Cavan Carvaghs list spells the name as Cavans. Ambrose Leet's 1814 Directory spells the name as Cavans.

== Geography ==
Cavanagh is bounded on the north by Mullaghduff townland, on the east by Cranaghan townland, on the south by Cloncollow townland and on the west by Agharaskilly townland. Its chief geographical features are Lough Rud (Loch Roda = The Red Lake) and a drumlin hill reaching to 219 feet (67 m) above sea-level. Cavanagh is traversed by the N87 road (Ireland), Cavanagh lane and the disused Cavan and Leitrim Railway. The townland covers 275 statute acres, including 9 acres (36,000 m^{2}) of water.

== History ==
In the Plantation of Ulster by grant dated 23 June 1610, along with other lands, King James VI and I granted two polls in Cavan to Hugh Culme, esquire, as part of the Manor of Calva. Culme then surrendered his interest in Cavanagh to Walter Talbot of Ballyconnell. Walter Talbot died on 26 June 1625 at Ballyconnell and his son James Talbot succeeded to the Cavanagh lands aged just 10 years. An Inquisition held in Cavan Town on 20 September 1630 stated that Walter Talbot's lands included two polls in Cavan. James Talbot married Helen Calvert, the daughter of George Calvert, 1st Baron Baltimore of Maryland, USA, in 1635 and had a son Colonel George Talbot who owned an estate in Cecil County, Maryland which he named Ballyconnell in honour of his native town in Cavan. George Talbot was appointed Surveyor-General of Maryland in 1683. In the aftermath of the Irish Rebellion of 1641, James Talbot's estate in Ballyconnell was confiscated in the Cromwellian Act for the Settlement of Ireland 1652 because he was a Catholic and he was granted an estate in 1655 at Castle Rubey, County Roscommon instead. He died in 1687.

By 1652 the Irish rebels in the Ballyconnell area had been defeated and the area was put under the control of the Cromwellian captain Thomas Gwyllym. He was a native of Glenavy, County Antrim where his father, Rev. Meredith Gwyllym, was vicar of the parishes of Glenavy, Camlin, Tullyrusk, Ballinderry & Magheragall from 1622 until sometime after 1634. Gwyllym's name first appears in the area as the owner in the 1652 Commonwealth Survey, which lists the townland as belonging to Captain Gwilliams. Gwyllym was also a Cavan Commissioner in the 1660 Hearth Money Ordinances and in the 1664 Hearth Money Rolls he has five hearths in Ballyconnell. After the restoration of King Charles II to the throne in 1660, James Talbot tried to have the Ballyconnell estate restored to him but a final grant was made to Thomas Gwyllym in August 1666, which included 39 acres-2 roods-8 perches of land in Cavan alias Caven. Thomas Gwyllym died in 1681 and his son Colonel Meredith Gwyllym inherited the Ballyconnell estate, including Cavanagh. Colonel Meredith Gwyllym died in 1711 and the Ballyconnell estate passed to his eldest son, Meredith Gwyllym.

A deed by the aforesaid Meredith Gwyllym dated 2 May 1724 includes the townland as: Cavan alias Caven.

The Gwyllym estate was sold for £8,000 in 1724 to Colonel Alexander Montgomery (1686–1729) of Convoy House, County Donegal, M.P. for Donegal Borough 1725 to 1727 & for Donegal County 1727 to 1729.

A lease dated 14 May 1728 by the aforesaid Alexander Montgomery included Cavan alias Caven.

Montgomery died in 1729 and left the Ballyconnell estate to his nephew George Leslie, who then assumed the name of George Leslie Montgomery. George Leslie Montgomery was M.P. for Strabane, County Tyrone from 1765 to 1768 and for County Cavan from 1770 to 1787, when he died and left the Ballyconnell estate to his son George Montgomery, whose estate was administered by the Court of Chancery as he was a lunatic. George Montgomery died in 1841 and his estate went to his Enery cousins of Bawnboy. In 1856 they sold the estate to take advantage of its increased value owing to the opening of the Woodford Canal through the town in the same year. The estate, including Cavanagh, was split up among different purchasers and maps & details of previous leases of the sold parts are still available.

In the Cavan Poll Book of 1761, there was one person registered to vote in Cavanagh in the Irish general election, 1761: William Smith. He was entitled to cast two votes. The four election candidates were Charles Coote, 1st Earl of Bellomont and Lord Newtownbutler (later Brinsley Butler, 2nd Earl of Lanesborough), both of whom were then elected Member of Parliament for Cavan County. The losing candidates were George Montgomery (MP) of Ballyconnell and Barry Maxwell, 1st Earl of Farnham. Absence from the poll book either meant a resident did not vote or, more likely, was not a freeholder entitled to vote, which would mean most of the inhabitants of Cavanagh.

In 1766 Cavanagh was one of the first Methodist communities founded in County Cavan. A Methodist Pioneer: or the Life and Labours of John Smith (1885), by Charles Henry Crookshank, states on page 196- In 1766, however, in connection with the zealous and faithful labours of John Smith, a large number of Societies were formed, including those at Mullalougher, Killashandra, Bawnboy, Belturbet, Cavanagh, Ballyconnell, Swanlinbar, Furnaceland and Gortnaleg.

The Tithe Applotment Books for 1827 list the following tithepayers in the townland- Patterson, Armstrong, Core, Taylor, Hacket.

The Ordnance Survey Name Books for 1836 give the following description of the townland- Cabhanach, 'abounding in hollows'. Belongs to Montgomery. Tithe 10d per arable acre. 90 acres of bog and pasture. Produces oats and potatoes. Soil light. Houses are built of mud. The inhabitants are mostly Protestants.

The Cavanagh Valuation Office books are available for February 1840.

Griffith's Valuation of 1857 lists the landlord of the townland as Vernon & the tenants as Faris, Taylor, Kells, Netterfield, Pattison, Armstrong and Stokes.

In the Dúchas Folklore Collection, a story by James Taylor relates a fairytale that occurred in Cavanagh in the 1850s. In the same collection there is a description of Cavanagh in 1938.

== Census ==
Year	Population	Males	Females	Total Houses	Uninhabited
1841	74	32	42	16	0
1851	51	25	26	11	1
1861	69	33	36	12	0
1871	64	31	33	12	0
1881	79	39	40	11	0
1891	67	36	31	11	0

In the 1901 census of Ireland, there are eleven families listed in the townland.

In the 1911 census of Ireland, there are eleven families listed in the townland.

== Antiquities ==
The only historic site in the townland is the disused track and Level Crossing of the Cavan and Leitrim Railway.
