= Mullynagolman =

Townland in County Cavan, Ireland

Coordinates: 54°4′56″N 7°34′44.5″W

Mullynagolman is a townland in the Parish of Tomregan, Barony of Loughtee Lower, County Cavan, Ireland.

== Etymology ==
The townland name is an anglicisation of the Gaelic placename Mullach na gColmán which means 'Summit of the Pigeons'. The oldest surviving mention of the name is in the will of John Armstrong dated 1757 where it is spelled Mullinagollinan. The will of Alexander Faris dated 1766 spells it as Mullinagolinan. The 1790 Cavan Carvaghs list spells the name as Mullagh. Ambrose Leet's 1814 Directory spells the name as Mullinagorman.

== Geography ==
It is bounded on the north by Cloncollow and Carrigan townlands, on the east by Aghavoher and Clifton, County Cavan townlands, on the south by Berrymount and Aghaweenagh townlands and on the west by Fartrin townland. Its chief geographical features are Togher Lough, the Rag River and a drumlin hill reaching to 300 feet (91 m) above sea-level. Mullynagolman is traversed by Slievebrickan Lane and Ardlougher Lane. The townland covers 109 statute acres, including 11 acres (45,000 m^{2}) of water.

== History ==
It formed part of the termon lands belonging to Tomregan Roman Catholic Church which were granted to the Protestant Bishop of Kilmore in 1610 as part of the Plantation of Ulster. By a lease dated 6 April 1612 the said bishop granted the lands to Sir Oliver Lambart of Kilbeggan, County Westmeath and Sir Garret Moore, 1st Viscount Moore of Mellifont, County Louth. On 17 July 1639 the bishop re-granted the lands to Charles Lambart, 1st Earl of Cavan. In the 1740s the bishop leased the land to John Jones for 21 years. This lease was renewed to his descendant John Copeland Jones on 20 May 1843. In the 1860s the holder of the lease was David Fielding Jones.

The Tithe Applotment Books for 1827 list the following tithepayers in the townland- Armstrong, Story.

In 1829 a Sunday school was kept in the townland, funded by the Hibernian Sunday School Society.

The Ordnance Survey Name Books for 1836 give the following description of the townland-Mullach na g-colman, 'hill of the pigeons'. South of parish. Protestant bishop's land. Lease held by Jones. Rent 16 shillings to £1 per arable acre. Comfortable inhabitants. Produce oats, flax and potatoes.

The Mullynagolman Valuation Office Field books are available for December 1838.

Griffith's Valuation of 1857 lists the landlords of the townland as Jones and Armstrong & the tenants as Armstrong and Givin.

== Census ==
Year	Population	Males	Females	Total Houses	Uninhabited
1841	60	30	30	9	1
1851	17	7	10	3	0
1861	15	8	7	3	0
1871	22	10	12	3	0
1881	12	5	7	2	0
1891	9	4	5	2	0

In the 1901 census of Ireland, there are five families listed in the townland.

In the 1911 census of Ireland, there are four families listed in the townland.

== Antiquities ==
1. The remains of Tomregan Monastery, Church, Round Tower and Graveyard famous for their association with St. Bricín and Cenn Fáelad mac Aillila. The County Cavan Ordnance Survey Memoirs of 1835 state- Before the present church was erected at Ballyconnell about 80 years ago, there existed a former church, the ruins of which, consisting of a few stones, may be seen in a field in the lands of Mr.Berry. (Site number 1689, page 205, Mullynagolman townland, "Archaeological Inventory of County Cavan", Patrick O’Donovan, 1995, where it is described as- Locally known as 'Church Meadow', this site is traditionally believed to be St Brecin's monastic settlement which formerly comprised a round tower, church and cemetery. According to Davies (1948, 116-7) traces of both church and round tower were evident as late as 1948, in addition to a number of cut stones, querns, and a large lump of iron slag which may have been a furnace bottom. The 'Tomregan Stone' (CV010-012002-) situated at the Church of Ireland chapel in Ballyconnell village is traditionally believed to have originated from here. No trace of monastic site at ground level. (Barrow 1979, 58).) The Ordnance Survey Ortho map dated 1995 seems to show underlying structures in the soil.
2. A medieval Togher or causeway at the Rag River outlet of Togher Lake (Site number 176, page 33, Cloncollow/Mullynagolman townland, "Archaeological Inventory of County Cavan", Patrick O’Donovan, 1995, where it is described as- Marked 'Togher Br.' on OS 1836 and 1876 eds. A modern concrete bridge now spans 'The Rag River' at this location).
3. A medieval crannóg in Togher Lough (Site number 1585, page 188, Mullynagolman townland, "Archaeological Inventory of County Cavan", Patrick O’Donovan, 1995, where it is described as- Small roughly circular island (dims. c. 18m) adjacent to the SW shore of Togher Lough, marked on OS 1836 and 1876 eds.)
4. Mullynagolman House.
5. Mullynagolman Hedge School. In 1835 the headmaster was John Graham, who taught reading, writing, arithmetic and English grammar. There were 55 pupils, 41 boys and 14 girls. The school was supported by the Kildare Place Society, with an annual subscription of £7 and payments of 6s per annum by the pupils.
