= John Richardson (bishop of Ardagh) =

English bishop (1580–1654)

John Richardson (1580–1654) was an English bishop of the Church of Ireland.

He was nominated Bishop of Ardagh on 8 April 1633 and consecrated in September that year. He was also Archdeacon of Derry from 1622 to 1634; and Archdeacon of Connor from 1639 to 1654. He left Ireland before the Rebellion of 1641 and died in London on 11 August 1654.

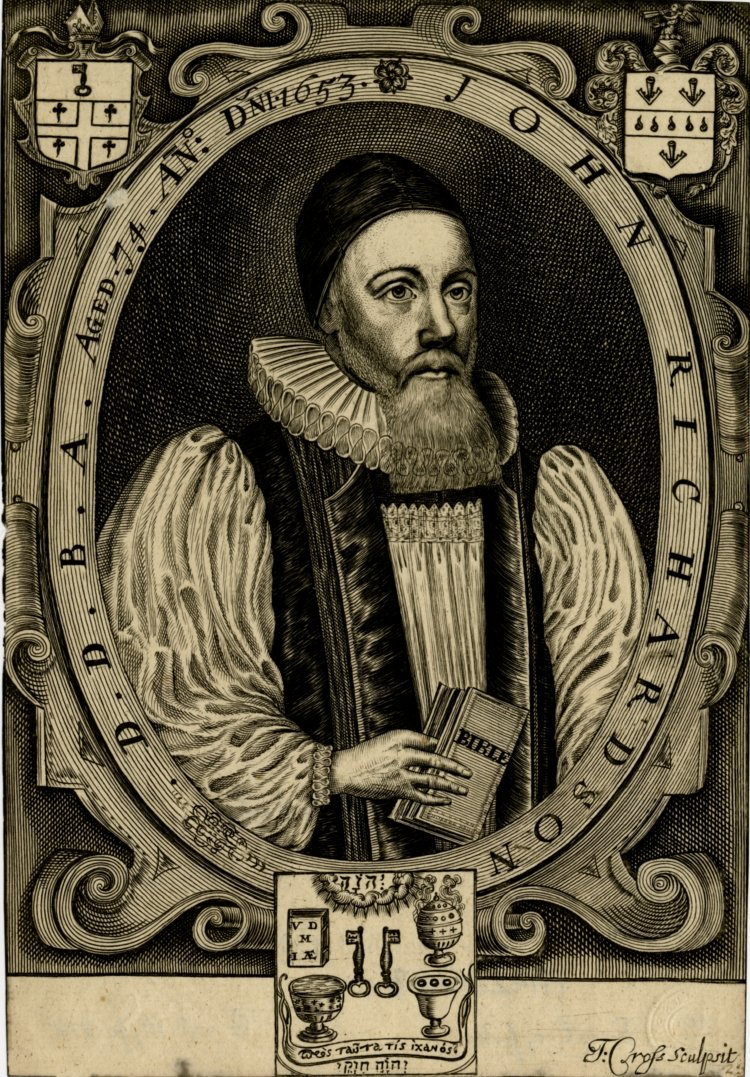
John Richardson.

== Life ==
He was born near Chester, entered Trinity College, Dublin, graduated M.A., and became a fellow in 1600. In the same year he was selected with James Ussher and another as lay preacher at Christ Church Cathedral, Dublin. Richardson's part was to preach on Wednesdays, and explain the prophecies of Isaiah. He later took holy orders, and was created D.D. in 1614.

Richardson held many preferments. He was appointed vicar of Granard, in Ardagh, in 1610; rector of Ardsrath, Derry, in 1617; Archdeacon of Derry in 1622 (reappointed in the new charter of 1629); Prebendary of Mullaghbrack at St Patrick's Cathedral, Armagh on 14 May 1633; and Bishop of Ardagh that same day (in succession to William Bedell who had resigned the see because he disapproved of pluralities); and Archdeacon of Down in 1640. Richardson, however, obtained leave to hold the archdeaconry in commendam; but he was shortly afterwards deprived of his rectory and archdeaconry by Bishop John Bramhall, who found his titles unsound.

On the outbreak of the Irish rebellion in 1641, Richardson left for England, and settled in London, where he died. He bequeathed money to Trinity College, Dublin.

== Family ==
Richardson married Elizabeth (baptised 1595), second daughter of Sir Henry Bunbury of Bunbury and Stanney by his first wife Elizabeth Anne Shakerley. Through her, he was uncle to Sir Thomas Bunbury, 1st Baronet. John and Elizabeth had at least one child, Thomas: in 1654, the township of Fartrin, County Cavan was part of the dowry on his marriage to Anne, younger daughter of Sir Edward Bagshawe of Castle Bagshawe, and widow of George Ryves.

== Works ==
Richardson's major work, published posthumously by Archbishop Ussher, was Choice Observations and Explanations of the Old Testament … to which are added further and larger Observations upon the whole Book of Genesis, London, 1655. He also contributed remarks on Ezekiel, Daniel, and the lesser prophets to the second edition of the Westminster Assembly's Annotations, published in 1657. His portrait, engraved by T. Cross, is prefixed to his Choice Observations.
