= Edward Bagshawe of Finglas =

Sir Edward Bagshawe (or Bagshaw) (died 6 October 1657) of Finglas, County Dublin, was knighted in 1627, reappointed a comptroller of customs in 1629 and was a member of parliament for the borough of Banagher in Strafford's parliament of 1634−1635. During the Commonwealth (1650s) he was a commissioner of the revenue.

== Biography ==
Little is known of Edward Bagshawe until 1624, when he appears as a customer of the ports of Dublin, Skerries, Malahide, and Wicklow, but his services to the government must have been considerable, as in 1627 he received a knighthood and was given a grant of lands, afterwards known as the manor of Castle Bagshawe, Belturbet in County Cavan.

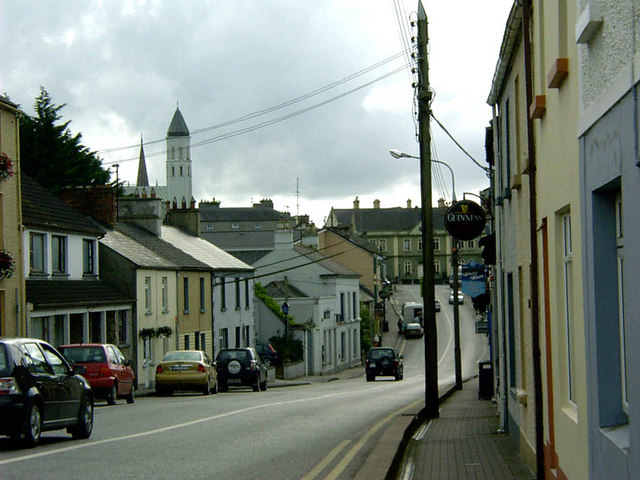
Belturbet, present day

At this time the government of Ireland farmed out the collection of customs duties to a consortium. That is the English consortium paid the government a fixed amount of money for the right to collect the customs duties and to keep the profits. The government benefited because it was guaranteed money while the consortium if their methods of collection were efficient, could profit from the agreement. The previous agreement was due to come to an end in 1629, so Sir Edward, who was the comptroller of the customs in Dublin, went to England in March 1629 to confer with the executors of the Duke of Buckingham's estate to see if the arrangement was to be renewed. It was between 1629 and 1631 the Duchess of Buckingham paid £6,000 for the farm and kept half the profits that accrued by the arrangement. The rest went to the consortium who managed the farm. In September of that year Sir Edward was reappointed and made joint comptroller of the customs in Dublin with Philip Perceval.

According to his own account, he tried to reform as customer a state of things in which everyone did as seemed right in their own eyes, and found that the more honest and faithful he became the less he was trusted, until finally he was so misjudged as to be committed to Dublin Castle. He emerged from there with less zeal and more discretion to become in Strafford's Parliament of 1634-5 member for the borough of Banagher, and under the Commonwealth, a commissioner of the revenue. He died 6 October 1657.

== Family ==
Sir Edward married a Miss Armstrong and had at least two daughters:

- Elizabeth, who married William Ryves (died 1642), son of Sir William Ryves, judge of the Court of King's Bench (Ireland), and had four sons;
- Ann, who married George Ryves (younger brother of William), a judge of the Prerogative Court and one of the masters of the chancery-in-ordinary. George died on 27 March 1647, and their two daughters Mary and Dorothy died the following January. In 1654 Anne remarried. She married Thomas Richardson, who came to Ireland in 1651, and held a number of Commonwealth government positions before being returned as a member for County Cavan in the Irish Convention of 1660 (This was just an assembly, not an official parliament). He was the son of John Richardson, Bishop of Ardagh and Elizabeth Bunbury. They were a Cheshire family, from near Chester.

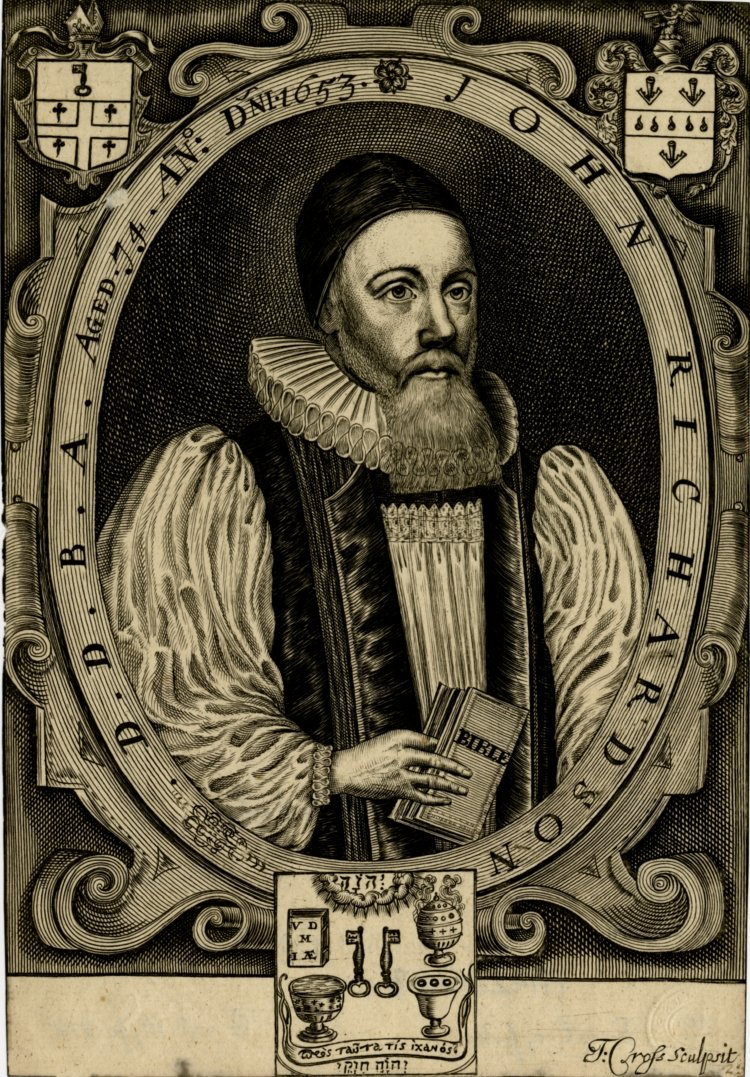
John Richardson, Bishop of Ardagh, father-in-law of Sir Edward's daughter Anne Bagshawe
