= Aghabane =

Townland in County Cavan, Ireland

Coordinates: 54.0235°N 7.560°W

Aghabane (Irish derived place name, Achadh Bán meaning 'The White Field'.) is a townland in the civil parish of Kildallan, barony of Tullyhunco, County Cavan, Ireland.

== Geography ==
Aghabane is bounded on the north by Killygowan townland, on the west by Coragh and Drumgoohy townlands, on the south by Derrindrehid townland and on the east by Coolnashinny and Disert, Tullyhunco townlands. Its chief geographical features are Aghabane Lough, Disert Lough, small streams, spring wells and a wood. Aghabane is traversed by the regional R199 road (Ireland), the local L5559 road, minor public roads and rural lanes. The townland covers 120 acres, including 18 acres of water.

== History ==
From medieval times up to the early 1600s, the land belonged to the McKiernan Clan. The present-day townlands of Drumgoohy and Makief formed part of Aghabane until the 1650s.

The 1609 Plantation of Ulster Map depicts the townland as Tagabane. A grant of 1610 spells the name as Taghabane. A lease of 1611 spells the name as Teighabane. An inquisition of 1629 spells the name as Taghabane. The 1652 Commonwealth Survey spells it as Aghobane.

In the Plantation of Ulster King James VI and I by grant dated 27 June 1610, granted the Manor of Keylagh, which included one poll in Taghabane, to John Achmootie, a Scottish Groom of the Bedchamber. His brother Alexander Achmootie was granted the neighbouring Manor of Dromheada. On 16 August 1610 John Aghmootie sold his lands in Tullyhunco to James Craig. On 1 May 1611 James Craig leased, inter alia, 1 poll of Teighabane to Corhonogho McKernan. On 29 July 1611 Arthur Chichester, 1st Baron Chichester and others reported that John Auchmothy and Alexander Auchmothye have not appeared at the lands awarded to them. James Craige is their deputy for five years, who has brought 4 artificers of divers sorts with their wives and families and 2 other servants. Stone raised for building a mill and trees felled, a walled house with a smith's forge built, 4 horses and mares upon the grounds with competent arms. An Inquisition held at Ballyconnell on 2 November 1629 stated that the poll of Taghabane contained six sub-divisions named Donnatt, Cargenevennage, Mackeif, Corvemna, Carevem and Tenforte. Sir James Craig died in the siege of Croaghan Castle on 8 April 1642. His land was inherited by his brother John Craig of Craig Castle, County Cavan and of Craigston, County Leitrim, who was chief doctor to both King James I and Charles I.

On 19 September 1643, James Gardiner of Aghabane gave the following deposition about the Irish Rebellion of 1641 in Cavan - James Gardiner late of Taghabane in the parrish of Kildallan in the County of Cavan, gent and tanner, sworne and examined sayth that in the begining of the present Rebellion he this deponent at Taghabane aforesaid and alsoe at Correnery in the Parrish of Killasandra & County of Cavan was deprived robbed or otherwise dispoyled of his goodes & chattells consisting of horses, Mares a Coult beasts, Cattle, sheepe, corne, Malt, howshold goods provition, his stock in his tannhowse in Killisandra & of the possession Rents and proffitts of 2 farmes. All of the value & to his present losse of five hundred & twenty powndes sterling. And this deponent is like to be deprived of and lose the future profits of his said farmes (worth £20 per annum) until a peace be established: And further saith that the persons that so deprived & despoiled him of his said goods were actors in the present Rebellion and are named as followeth vizt.- Connor O’Rely of Aghroskilly in the same County gentleman, John mcMulmore Rely of Killicrannah in the same County, gent, Gillernew McGaverran of Talloghagh, gente, and Charles Mc Gaverran of the same, gent, Keire O’Rourke of - in the County of Leitrim, gent, Myles O’Rely then high sherriff of the said County of Cavan, Ferrall mc Call O’Rely of Cashell in the same County of Cavan, gent, & divers others whose names he knows not, being their souldjers, Complicees and assistants.

The 1652 Commonwealth Survey states the owner was Lewis Craig. In the Hearth Money Rolls compiled on 29 September 1663 there were three Hearth Tax payers in Aghaban- John Charlton, George Hucheson and Thomas McCleland. Charlton had three hearths, which indicates a large house, while the rest had one hearth each.

Lord John Carmichael (1710–1787), the 4th Earl of Hyndford of Castle Craig, County Cavan, inherited the lands from the Craig estate. In 1758 Carmichael sold the lands to the Farnham Estate of Cavan. The estate papers are now in the National Library of Ireland and those papers mentioning Aghabane are at reference numbers MS 41,114 /6; MS 41,114 /9; MS 41,114 /16 and MS 41,114 /20.

The 1790 Cavan Carvaghs list spells the townland name as Aghubane.

The 1825 Tithe Applotment Books list one tithepayer in the townland.

The Aghabane Valuation Office books are available for 1838.

Griffith's Valuation of 1857 lists one landholder in the townland.

== Census ==
Year	Population	Males	Females	Total Houses	Uninhabited
1841	23	12	11	4	0
1851	26	10	16	5	0
1861	19	10	9	4	0
1871	11	6	5	3	0
1881	11	6	5	3	0
1891	22	7	15	4	0

In the 1901 census of Ireland, there are seven families listed in the townland.

In the 1911 census of Ireland, there are two families listed in the townland.

== Antiquities ==
1. A medieval crannog in Disert Lough. The Architectural Survey of County Cavan describes it as- The Small circular island (diam. c.12m) in Disert Lough, c. 100m from the shoreline. Very overgrown with vegetation.
2. A castle. The Architectural Survey of County Cavan describes it as- Davies (1948a, 124) recorded a tradition of a castle formerly situated on the lawn of Aghabane House on the downward slope to Aghabane lake. Not visible at ground level. The precise location of this feature is not known.
3. Aubawn House, built c. 1750.
