= Drummully (disambiguation) =

Drummully may refer to the following places in Ulster in Ireland:

Counties Monaghan and Fermanagh

- Drummully (civil parish), a civil parish in baronies of Dartree (Monaghan), Clankelly and Coole (both Fermanagh)

County Monaghan

- Drummully, electoral division in Clones No. 1 rural district — comprising the Monaghan (Dartree) portion of the civil parish of Drummully
- Drummully, Saint Tierney, townland in Clones civil parish, Dartree barony — Saint Tierney electoral division, Clones No.1 rural district
- Drummully, Trough, townland in Donagh civil parish, Trough barony — Anketell Grove electoral division, Monaghan rural district

County Fermanagh

- Drummully, Coole, townland in Drummully civil parish, Coole barony — in Derrysteaton electoral division, Clones No.2 (later Lisnaskea) rural district
- Drummully, Knockninny, townland and electoral division; townland in Kinawley civil parish, Knockninny barony — electoral division in Lisnaskea rural district

County Cavan

- Drummully East, townlands in Kildallan civil parish, Tullyhunco barony — Killashandra electoral division, Cavan rural district
- Drummully West, beside Drummully East
- Oakwood or Drummully, townland in Castleterra civil parish, Loughtee Upper barony — Ballyhaise electoral division, Cavan rural district
