= Killygowan =

Townland in County Cavan, Ireland

Killygowan (Irish derived place name, Coill Uí Ghabhann meaning either ‘The Wood of O’Gowan’ or ‘The Wood of the Blacksmith’.) is a townland in the civil parish of Kildallan, barony of Tullyhunco, County Cavan, Ireland.

== Geography ==
Killygowan is bounded on the north by Druminiskill townland, on the west by Drumbinnis and Drumgoohy townlands, on the south by Aghabane, Coolnashinny and Disert, Tullyhunco townlands and on the east by Mullaghmullan townland. Its chief geographical features are Aghabane Lough, small streams and a wood. Killygowan is traversed by the regional R199 road (Ireland), minor public roads and rural lanes. The townland covers 121 acres.

== History ==
From medieval times up to the early 1600s, the land belonged to the McKiernan Clan. Up until the 1650s, Killygowan formed part of Coolnashinny or Croaghan townland and its history is the same until then.

An inquisition of 1629 spells the name as Killegowne.

An Inquisition held at Ballyconnell on 2 November 1629 stated that Sir James Craig owned the four polls of Craghan which contained, inter alia, a sub-division named Killegowne. Sir James Craig died in the siege of Croaghan Castle on 8 April 1642. His land was inherited by his brother John Craig of Craig Castle, County Cavan and of Craigston, County Leitrim, who was chief doctor to both King James I and Charles I.

Lord John Carmichael (1710–1787), the 4th Earl of Hyndford of Castle Craig, County Cavan, inherited the lands from the Craig estate. In 1758 Carmichael sold the lands to the Farnham Estate of Cavan. The estate papers are now in the National Library of Ireland. The documents mentioning Killygowan are at reference numbers MS 41,114 /7 and MS 41,114 /17.

In the Cavan Poll Book of 1761, there was one person registered to vote in Killygowan in the Irish general election, 1761 - Thomas Burrows, who was entitled to cast two votes. The four election candidates were Charles Coote, 1st Earl of Bellomont and Lord Newtownbutler (later Brinsley Butler, 2nd Earl of Lanesborough), both of whom were then elected Member of Parliament for Cavan County. The losing candidates were George Montgomery (MP) of Ballyconnell and Barry Maxwell, 1st Earl of Farnham. Absence from the poll book either meant a resident did not vote or more likely was not a freeholder entitled to vote, which would mean most of the inhabitants of Killygowan.

The 1790 Cavan Carvaghs list spells the townland name as Killigown.

The 1825 Tithe Applotment Books list four tithepayers in the townland.

The Killygowan Valuation Office books are available for April 1838.

Griffith's Valuation of 1857 lists thirteen landholders in the townland.

In the 19th century the landlord of most of Killygowan was Richard Carson.

== Census ==
Year	Population	Males	Females	Total Houses	Uninhabited
1841	83	42	41	17	1
1851	52	25	27	11	1
1861	26	15	11	9	1
1871	19	10	9	7	0
1881	16	7	9	7	1
1891	20	10	10	6	0

In the 1901 census of Ireland, there were eight families listed in the townland.

In the 1911 census of Ireland, there were six families listed in the townland.
