= Drumgoohy =

Townland in County Cavan, Ireland

Drumgoohy' (Irish derived place name, either Droim gCuaiche meaning 'The Hill-Ridge of the Cuckoo' or Droim Guthaidhe meaning 'The Hill-Ridge of the Voices'.) is a townland in the civil parish of Kildallan, barony of Tullyhunco, County Cavan, Ireland.

== Geography ==
Drumgoohy is bounded on the north by Drumbinnis townland, on the west by Coragh, Makief and Mullaghdoo, Cavan townlands and on the east by Aghabane and Killygowan townlands. Its chief geographical features are small streams, spring wells and small woods. Drumgoohy is traversed by the regional R199 road (Ireland), the local L5559 road, minor public roads and rural lanes. The townland covers 106 acres.

== History ==
From medieval times up to the early 1600s, the land belonged to the McKiernan Clan. Until the 1650s, Drumgoohy formed part of the modern-day townland of Aghabane and its history is the same up until then.

The 1652 Commonwealth Survey spells it as Droomgoohy.

In the Plantation of Ulster in 1610 the land was granted to Sir James Craig who later died in the siege of Croaghan Castle on 8 April 1642. His land was inherited by his brother John Craig of Craig Castle, County Cavan and of Craigston, County Leitrim, who was chief doctor to both King James I and Charles I.

The 1652 Commonwealth Survey states the owner was Lewis Craig.

Lord John Carmichael (1710–1787), the 4th Earl of Hyndford of Castle Craig, County Cavan, inherited the lands from the Craig estate.

The 1790 Cavan Carvaghs list spells the townland name as Drumguhy.

The 1825 Tithe Applotment Books list five tithepayers in the townland.

The Drumgoohy Valuation Office books are available for April 1838.

Griffith's Valuation of 1857 lists six landholders in the townland.

The landlord of Drumgoohy in the 19th century was Richard Fox.

== Census ==
Year	Population	Males	Females	Total Houses	Uninhabited
1841	25	13	12	4	0
1851	14	7	7	3	0
1861	12	4	8	4	0
1871	15	9	6	4	1
1881	14	8	6	3	0
1891	17	9	8	3	0

In the 1901 census of Ireland, there were four families listed in the townland.

In the 1911 census of Ireland, there were three families listed in the townland.
