= Disert, Tullyhunco =

Townland in Kildallan, Tullyhunco, County Cavan, Ireland

Disert (from Irish Diseart 'The Hermitage') is a townland in the civil parish of Kildallan, barony of Tullyhunco, County Cavan, Ireland.

== Geography ==
Disert is bounded on the north by Coolnashinny townland; on the west by Aghabane, Derrindrehid, and Killygowan townlands; on the south by Bawn townland; and on the east by Killytawny townland.

Its chief geographical features are Aghabane Lough, Disert Lough, the Croghan river, small streams, a spring well, and a wood. Disert is traversed by the regional R199 road, minor public roads, and rural lanes. The townland covers 106 acres, including 18 acres of water.

== Etymology ==
The earliest surviving reference to the townland appears to be in the medieval Irish manuscript An Leabhar Breac, compiled in c.1409. Page 238C is a copy of the Amra Coluim Chille, written by Saint Dallán Forgaill of Kildallan, and refers to "Dallan o Disirt Dallain" (Dallan from the Hermitage of Dallan).

The 1609 Plantation of Ulster Map depicts the townland as Disert. A government grant of 1610 spells the name as Disert. A 1629 Inquisition also gives the name as Disert. John Colgan's 1645 book Acta Sanctorum Hiberniae, under 29 January, spells the name as Disert Dallain, Diseart Dallain and Deserto Sanctus Dallani. The 1652 Commonwealth Survey spells the name as Deeshert.

== History ==
It would seem from the early 15th century reference in An Leabhar Breac that Dallan Forgaill used the townland as a retreat at the end of the 6th century, perhaps because it would have been surrounded by water at the time. A sub-division of the townland is called Corredonagh, which is a corruption of Cor Domhnach, meaning 'the round hill of the church', which may confirm the etymology. From medieval times until the early 1600s, the land belonged to the McKiernan Clan. The present-day townland of Coragh formed part of Disert until the 1650s.

In the Plantation of Ulster, by letters patent dated 23 July 1610 King James VI and I granted the Manor of Clonyn or Taghleagh, which included one poll of Disert, to Sir Alexander Hamilton of Innerwick, Scotland. On 29 July 1611, Arthur Chichester, 1st Baron Chichester and others reported that:

Sir Alexander Hamilton, Knt, 2,000 acres in the county of Cavan; has not appeared: his son Claude took possession, and brought three servants and six artificers; is in hand with building a mill; trees felled; raised stones and hath competent arms in readiness. Besides the above named there are arrived upon that portion since our return from the journey (as we are informed) twelve tenants and artificers who intend to reside there and build upon the same.

An Inquisition held at Cavan on 10 June 1629 stated that the poll of Disert contained two sub-divisions named Corrach and Corredonagh. It also described the boundary of the townland:

> Disert 1/2 a pole meered all upon the southe and east by the logh and river, and upon the north, boundinge upon the Croghin, by a boge betwixt the river and the logh on the west, and from that logh over to the logh and river upon the west side, by an edge betwixt Tachubane, Disert-Corrogh and Corredomahe; the other 1/2 pole of Disert bounding to the Rushskein and Leachin, on the south, thorowe a boge to a logh, and bounding upon the west to Machie thorowe a woode on drye grounde to Tachabane, on the north and east meered by a boge and runninge brooke into the river, belowe the foorde of Bellaghinfin.

The 1652 Commonwealth Survey states that the owner was Sir Francis Hamilton.

In the Hearth Money Rolls compiled on 29 September 1663 there was one Hearth Tax payer in Disert- William Lotartty.

The 1790 Cavan Carvaghs list spells the townland name as Disart.

The 1825 Tithe Applotment Books list three tithepayers in the townland.

The Disert Valuation Office books are available for April 1838.

There is an estate map and detailed description of Disert in 1849.

Griffith's Valuation of 1857 lists two landholders in the townland.

The landlord of Disert in the 19th century was James Hamilton.

The Cavan Archives Service holds an assignment dated 12 March 1903 (reference number P017/0164):

Assignment made between Robert Claude Hamilton, Drummany House, County Cavan, esquire, of the first part, William Joseph Hamilton, Castlehamilton, County Cavan, D.L., of the second part, and Richard Allen and William Henry Halpin, both Cavan, County Cavan, solicitors, the trustees, of the third part. States that Robert Claude Hamilton holds part of the lands of Disert (Dysart or Desert), barony of Tullyhunco, County Cavan, containing 42 acres, 3 roods and 31 perches statute measure, as tenant from year to year of William Joseph Hamilton at annual rent of £30. Robert Claude Hamilton has agreed to sell his interest in the tenancy of William Joseph Hamilton for sum of £250. Latter is a limited owner of the lands. In order to avoid a merger of the tenancy it has been agreed that the lands should be assigned to the parties of the third part in trust.

== Census ==
Year	Population	Males	Females	Total Houses	Uninhabited
1841	5	4	1	2	1
1851	13	8	5	2	0
1861	7	3	4	2	0
1871	12	7	5	2	0
1881	14	8	6	2	0
1891	2	1	1	1	0

In the 1901 census of Ireland, there was one family listed in the townland.

In the 1911 census of Ireland, there was one family listed in the townland.

== Antiquities ==
1. Croaghan Bridge.
