= Drumcanon =

Townland in County Cavan, Ireland

- Townland
- Location in Ireland
- Coordinates: 54°02′42″N 7°32′49″W
- Country: Ireland
- County: County Cavan
- Parish: Kildallan

Drumcanon (Irish derived place name, Droim Ceann Fhionn meaning 'The Hill-Ridge of the White Top'.) is a townland in the civil parish of Kildallan, barony of Tullyhunco, County Cavan, Ireland.

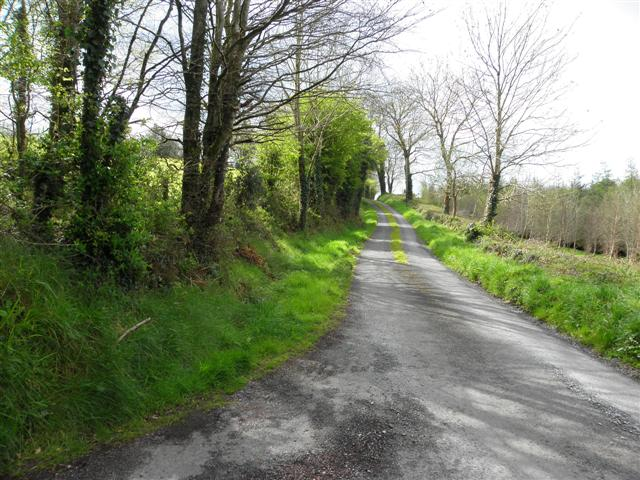
Road at Drumcanon (geograph 2915454)

== Geography ==
Drumcanon is bounded on the north by Claraghpottle Glebe townland, on the west by Claragh and Keilagh townlands, on the south by Druminiskill townland and on the east by Bocade Glebe and Drumcartagh townlands. Its chief geographical features are small streams and spring wells. Drumcanon is traversed by minor public roads and rural lanes. The townland covers 81 acres.

== History ==
From medieval times up to the early 1600s, the land belonged to the McKiernan Clan. The 1652 Commonwealth Survey spells the name as Dromchanon.

Up until the 1650s Drumcanon formed part of the modern-day townland of Drumcartagh and its history is the same till then.

Sir James Craig received the lands as part of his estate in the Plantation of Ulster and he died in the siege of Croaghan Castle on 8 April 1642. His land was inherited by his brother John Craig of Craig Castle, County Cavan and of Craigston, County Leitrim, who was chief doctor to both King James I and Charles I. The 1652 Commonwealth Survey lists the owner as Lewis Craig. In the Hearth Money Rolls compiled on 29 September 1663 there was one Hearth Tax payer in Dromcanan- James Anderson.

Lord John Carmichael (1710–1787), the 4th Earl of Hyndford of Castle Craig, County Cavan, inherited the lands from the Craig estate. In 1758 Carmichael sold the lands to the Farnham Estate of Cavan. The estate papers are now in the National Library of Ireland and those mentioning Drumcanon are listed under reference MS 41,114 /7 and MS 41,114 /17.

A marriage settlement dated 7 March 1750 relates to the Faris family with lands in Drumcommon etc.

The 1790 Cavan Carvaghs list spells the townland name as Dromcannon.

The 1825 Tithe Applotment Books list five tithepayers in the townland.

The Drumcanon Valuation Office books are available for April 1838.

On 13 November 1851 the following decision was made by the Incumbered Estates Court- The Chief Commissioner sat in the Court, Henrietta-street, Dublin, to-day, for the purpose of selling incumbered property. In the matter of the estates of Williams James Thomas GALBRAITH, owner. Ex parte Morgan CROFTON, petitioner. Lot 1, the house and demesne of Macken, and Drumbinnis, Keilagh, Druminisdill, Drumcartagh, and Drumcannon, county of Cavan, containing £74. 0r. 15p. state measure, held in fee farm, producing a gross annual rental of £484, 11s, 10d., subject to two fee farm rents, one of £131, 18s. 6d., and the other of £62, 6s. 2d. The biddings proceeded from £4000 to £5390, at which sum Mrs. Elizabeth GALBRAITH became the purchaser. Lot 2, the fee simple lands of EVLAGHMORE, containing 140s. 1. 39p. statute measure, and producing an annual rental of £76, 11s, 8d. The first offer was £700., and Mr. W. Galbraith (the owner) was the purchaser for £1000.

Griffith's Valuation of 1857 lists six landholders in the townland.

The landlord of most of Drumcanon in the 19th century was Captain John Johnston.

== Census ==
| Year | Population | Males | Females | Total Houses | Uninhabited |
|---|---|---|---|---|---|
| 1841 | 24 | 13 | 11 | 5 | 0 |
| 1851 | 43 | 18 | 25 | 7 | 0 |
| 1861 | 34 | 17 | 17 | 5 | 0 |
| 1871 | 26 | 16 | 10 | 4 | 0 |
| 1881 | 21 | 13 | 8 | 4 | 0 |
| 1891 | 18 | 10 | 8 | 4 | 0 |

In the 1901 census of Ireland, there were five families listed in the townland.

In the 1911 census of Ireland, there were five families listed in the townland.
