= Mullaghmullan =

Townland in County Cavan, Ireland

Mullaghmullan (Irish derived place name, Mullach Maoiláin meaning either ‘The Summit of the Hillock’ or ‘The Summit of Maolán’) is a townland in the civil parish of Kildallan, barony of Tullyhunco, County Cavan, Ireland.

== Geography ==
Mullaghmullan is bounded on the north by Druminiskill townland, on the west by Killygowan townland and on the east by Coolnashinny, Drummully West and Drummully East townlands. Its chief geographical features are Mullaghmullan Hill which reaches a height of 310 feet, small streams, spring wells and a dug well. Mullaghmullan is traversed by the local L5503 road, minor public roads and rural lanes. The townland covers 104 acres.

== History ==
From medieval times up to the early 1600s, the land belonged to the McKiernan Clan. Up until the 1650s, Mullaghmullan formed part of Coolnashinny or Croaghan townland and its history is the same until then.

An inquisition of 1629 spells the name as Mullaghnemullin.

An Inquisition held at Ballyconnell on 2 November 1629 stated that Sir James Craig owned the four polls of Craghan which contained, inter alia, a sub-division named Mullaghnemullin. Sir James Craig met his demise during the siege of Croaghan Castle on 8 April 1642. Following his death, his land passed on to his brother, John Craig of Craig Castle, County Cavan, and of Craigston, County Leitrim. John Craig held the esteemed position of chief doctor to both King James I and Charles I.

Lord John Carmichael (1710–1787), the 4th Earl of Hyndford of Castle Craig, County Cavan, inherited the lands from the Craig estate. In 1758 Carmichael sold the lands to the Farnham Estate of Cavan. The estate papers are now in the National Library of Ireland. The documents mentioning Mullaghmullan are at reference numbers MS 41,114 /7 and MS 41,114 /17.

In the Cavan Poll Book of 1761, there was one person registered to vote in Mullaghnamullen in the Irish general election, 1761 - Reverend George Carson who resided in Crohan and was entitled to cast two votes. George Carson was the Presbyterian minister at Coolnashinny from 1735 to 1780. He died on 10 January 1782. The four election candidates in 1761 were Charles Coote, 1st Earl of Bellomont and Lord Newtownbutler (later Brinsley Butler, 2nd Earl of Lanesborough), both of whom were then elected Member of Parliament for Cavan County. The losing candidates were George Montgomery (MP) of Ballyconnell and Barry Maxwell, 1st Earl of Farnham. Absence from the poll book either meant a resident did not vote or more likely was not a freeholder entitled to vote, which would mean most of the inhabitants of Mullaghmullan.

The 1790 Cavan Carvaghs list spells the townland name as Mullaghamullin.

The 1825 Tithe Applotment Books list one tithepayer in the townland.

The Mullaghmullan Valuation Office books are available for April 1838.

Griffith's Valuation of 1857 lists five landholders in the townland.

The will of John Burns of Mullaghnamullen died 9 May 1897.

In the 19th century the landlord of Mullaghmullan was Richard Carson.

== Census ==
Year	Population	Males	Females	Total Houses	Uninhabited
1841	21	13	8	4	0
1851	44	21	23	6	1
1861	32	17	15	5	1
1871	21	13	8	5	0
1881	8	4	4	3	0
1891	14	5	9	3	0

In the 1901 census of Ireland, there were six families listed in the townland.

In the 1911 census of Ireland, there were four families listed in the townland.
