= R199 =

R199 may refer to:

- Mercedes-Benz SLR McLaren, a car
- R199 road (Ireland), a regional road in Ireland
