= Claragh =

Townland in County Cavan, Ireland

Claragh (from Irish Clárach, meaning 'level place') is a townland in the civil parish of Kildallan, barony of Tullyhunco, County Cavan, Ireland.

== Geography ==
Claragh is bounded on the north by Kildallan townland, on the west by Clonkeen townland, on the south by Drumcanon and Keilagh townlands and on the east by Bocade Glebe and Claraghpottle Glebe townlands. Its chief geographical features are a pond, small streams, a spring well and a dug well. Claragh is traversed by minor public roads and rural lanes. The townland covers 111 acres.

== History ==
From medieval times up to the early 1600s, the land belonged to the McKiernan Clan.

The 1609 Plantation of Ulster Map depicts the townland as Clarhagh. A grant of 1610 spells the name as Clarhagh. A lease of 1611 spells the name as Clovagh. An inquisition of 1629 spells the name as Claragh. The 1652 Commonwealth Survey spells it as Cleighragh.

In the Plantation of Ulster King James VI and I by grant dated 27 June 1610, granted the Manor of Keylagh, which included three-quarters of the poll of Clarhagh, to John Achmootie, a Scottish Groom of the Bedchamber. His brother Alexander Achmootie was granted the neighbouring Manor of Dromheada. The remaining quarter of Claragh was given to the Church of Ireland and is now the townland of Claraghpottle Glebe. On 16 August 1610 John Aghmootie sold his lands in Tullyhunco to James Craig. On 1 May 1611 James Craig leased 3/4 of the poll of Clovagh to Donatio McKernan. On 29 July 1611 Arthur Chichester, 1st Baron Chichester and others reported that John Auchmothy and Alexander Auchmothye have not appeared at the lands awarded to them. James Craige is their deputy for five years, who has brought 4 artificers of divers sorts with their wives and families and 2 other servants. Stone raised for building a mill and trees felled, a walled house with a smith's forge built, 4 horses and mares upon the grounds with competent arms. An Inquisition held at Ballyconnell on 2 November 1629 stated that 3/4 of the poll of Claragh contained seven sub-divisions named Tonevollie, Aghbellenefinny, Tawnebegg, Coolenesellagh, Aghemore, Tawnemillegh and Moneynesnagh. Sir James Craig died in the siege of Croaghan Castle on 8 April 1642. His land was inherited by his brother John Craig of Craig Castle, County Cavan and of Craigston, County Leitrim, who was chief doctor to both King James I and Charles I.

The 1652 Commonwealth Survey states the owner was the Church of Ireland, Gleabland. In the Hearth Money Rolls compiled on 29 September 1663 there was one Hearth Tax payer in Cleragh- James Cranston.

Lord John Carmichael (1710–1787), the 4th Earl of Hyndford of Castle Craig, County Cavan, inherited the lands from the Craig estate. In 1758 Carmichael sold the lands to the Farnham Estate of Cavan. The estate papers are now in the National Library of Ireland.

The 1790 Cavan Carvaghs list spells the townland name as Claragh.

The 1825 Tithe Applotment Books list ten tithepayers in the townland.

In the 1825 Registry of Freeholders for County Cavan there was one freeholder registered in Claragh- James McAllister. He was a Forty-shilling freeholders holding a lease for lives from his landlord, George Faris.

The Claragh Valuation Office books are available for April 1838.

Griffith's Valuation of 1857 lists nine landholders in the townland.

== Census ==
Year	Population	Males	Females	Total Houses	Uninhabited
1841	103	50	53	17	0
1851	61	30	31	11	0
1861	44	17	27	8	0
1871	42	20	22	7	0
1881	36	18	18	8	1
1891	30	18	12	6	1

In the 1901 census of Ireland, there are seven families listed in the townland.

In the 1911 census of Ireland, there are five families listed in the townland.
