= Druminiskill =

Townland in County Cavan, Ireland

Druminiskill (Irish derived place name, Droim Fhionn Ascaill meaning ‘The Hill-Ridge of the White Hollow’.) is a townland in the civil parish of Kildallan, barony of Tullyhunco, County Cavan, Ireland.

== Geography ==
Druminiskill is bounded on the north by Drumcanon townland, on the south by Mullaghmullan townland, on the west by Drumbinnis, Keilagh and Killygowan townlands and on the east by Drumcartagh and Drummully West townlands. Its chief geographical features are small streams, spring wells and a forestry plantation. Druminiskill is traversed by minor public roads and rural lanes. The townland covers 151 acres.

== History ==
From medieval times up to the early 1600s, the land belonged to the McKiernan Clan. Up until the 1650s, Druminiskill formed part of Coolnashinny or Croaghan townland and its history is the same until then.

An inquisition of 1629 spells the name as Dromenisklein. The 1652 Commonwealth Survey spells the name as Dromeniselyn.

An Inquisition held at Ballyconnell on 2 November 1629 stated that Sir James Craig owned the four polls of Craghan which contained, inter alia, a sub-division named Dromenisklein. Sir James Craig died in the siege of Croaghan Castle on 8 April 1642. His land was inherited by his brother John Craig of Craig Castle, County Cavan and of Craigston, County Leitrim, who was chief doctor to both King James I and Charles I.

The 1652 Commonwealth Survey lists the landowner as Lady Craig.

Lord John Carmichael (1710–1787), the 4th Earl of Hyndford of Castle Craig, County Cavan, inherited the lands from the Craig estate. In 1758 Carmichael sold the lands to the Farnham Estate of Cavan. The estate papers are now in the National Library of Ireland. The documents mentioning Druminiskill are at reference numbers MS 41,114 /7 and MS 41,114 /17.

A marriage settlement dated 7 March 1750 relates to the Faris family with lands in Drummershill etc.

The 1790 Cavan Carvaghs list spells the townland name as Drominiskil.

The 1825 Tithe Applotment Books list six tithepayers in the townland.

The Druminiskill Valuation Office books are available for 1838.

On 13 November 1851 the following decision was made by the Incumbered Estates Court- The Chief Commissioner sat in the Court, Henrietta-street, Dublin, to-day, for the purpose of selling incumbered property. In the matter of the estates of Williams James Thomas GALBRAITH, owner. Ex parte Morgan CROFTON, petitioner. Lot 1, the house and demesne of Macken, and Drumbinnis, Keilagh, Druminisdill, Drumcartagh, and Drumcannon, county of Cavan, containing £74. 0r. 15p. state measure, held in fee farm, producing a gross annual rental of £484, 11s, 10d., subject to two fee farm rents, one of £131, 18s. 6d., and the other of £62, 6s. 2d. The biddings proceeded from £4000 to £5390, at which sum Mrs. Elizabeth GALBRAITH became the purchaser. Lot 2, the fee simple lands of EVLAGHMORE, containing 140s. 1. 39p. statute measure, and producing an annual rental of £76, 11s, 8d. The first offer was £700., and Mr. W. Galbraith (the owner) was the purchaser for £1000.

Griffith's Valuation of 1857 lists five landholders in the townland.

In the 19th century the landlord of Druminiskill was Captain John Johnston.

== Census ==
Year	Population	Males	Females	Total Houses	Uninhabited
1841	25	10	15	4	1
1851	21	9	12	3	0
1861	17	9	8	3	0
1871	13	6	7	4	0
1881	11	5	6	3	0
1891	8	5	3	3	1

In the 1901 census of Ireland, there were two families listed in the townland.

In the 1911 census of Ireland, there were two families listed in the townland.
