= Drumcartagh =

Townland in County Cavan, Ireland

- Townland
- Location in Ireland
- Coordinates: 54°02′28″N 7°32′32″W
- Country: Ireland
- County: County Cavan
- Parish: Kildallan

Drumcartagh (Irish derived place name, either Droim Cartha meaning 'The Hill-Ridge of the Standing Stone' or Droim Cartach meaning the 'Hill-Ridge of the Carts'.) is a townland in the civil parish of Kildallan, barony of Tullyhunco, County Cavan, Ireland. It is also called Diamondhill.

== Geography ==
Drumcartagh is bounded on the north by Bocade Glebe townland, on the west by Drumcanon and Druminiskill townlands, on the south by Drummully West townland and on the east by Drumbagh townland. Its chief geographical features are Drumcartagh Hill which reaches a height of 351 feet, a forestry plantation, small streams and spring wells. Drumcartagh is traversed by minor public roads and rural lanes. The townland covers 68 acres.

== History ==
From medieval times up to the early 1600s, the land belonged to the McKiernan Clan.

The 1609 Plantation of Ulster Map depicts the townland as Dromchartagh. Government grants of 1610 spells the name as Dromcartagh. A lease of 1611 spells the name as Dromartagh. Inquisitions in 1629 spell the name as Dromcartagh and Dromkartagh.

In the Plantation of Ulster King James VI and I by grant dated 27 June 1610, granted the Manor of Keylagh, which included 11/12 parts of the poll of Dromcartagh, to John Achmootie, a Scottish Groom of the Bedchamber. His brother Alexander Achmootie was granted the neighbouring Manor of Dromheada. On 23 July 1610 the king granted the Manor of Clonyn or Taghleagh, which included the remaining 1/12 part of Drumcartagh, to Sir Alexander Hamilton of Innerwick, Scotland and this 1/12 part was called Dromacho. On 16 August 1610 John Aghmootie sold his lands in Tullyhunco to James Craig. On 1 May 1611 James Craig leased Dromartragh to Brien Oge McKernan. On 29 July 1611 Arthur Chichester, 1st Baron Chichester and others reported that John Auchmothy and Alexander Auchmothye have not appeared at the lands awarded to them. James Craige is their deputy for five years, who has brought 4 artificers of divers sorts with their wives and families and 2 other servants. Stone raised for building a mill and trees felled, a walled house with a smith's forge built, 4 horses and mares upon the grounds with competent arms. Chichester also reported that- Sir Alexander Hamilton, Knt, 2,000 acres in the county of Cavan; has not appeared: his son Claud took possession, and brought three servants and six artificers; is in hand with building a mill; trees felled; raised stones and hath competent arms in readiness. Besides there are arrived upon that portion since our return to Dublin from the journey, as we are informed, twelve tenants and artificers who intend to reside there and build upon the same. An Inquisition held at Cavan on 10 June 1629 stated that The 12th part of the pole of Dromkartagh lyinge next to the potle of Dromdromucho, being parcel of the 2 poles of Drumwillies. An Inquisition held at Ballyconnell on 2 November 1629 stated that 11/12 of the poll of Dromcartagh contained six sub-divisions named Tonnecure, Knockeglisse, Tawnaghgarrone, Cospur, Leggennammer and Tagheware. Sir James Craig died in the siege of Croaghan Castle on 8 April 1642. His land was inherited by his brother John Craig of Craig Castle, County Cavan and of Craigston, County Leitrim, who was chief doctor to both King James I and Charles I.

In the Hearth Money Rolls compiled on 29 September 1663 there was one Hearth Tax payer in Dromohacha- Phillip Brady.

Lord John Carmichael (1710–1787), the 4th Earl of Hyndford of Castle Craig, County Cavan, inherited the lands from the Craig estate. In 1758 Carmichael sold the lands to the Farnham Estate of Cavan. The estate papers are now in the National Library of Ireland and those mentioning Drumcartagh are listed under reference MS 41,114 /7.

A marriage settlement dated 7 March 1750 relates to the Faris family with lands in Drumcartagh etc.

The 1825 Tithe Applotment Books list four tithepayers in the townland. The Drumcartagh Valuation Office books are available for April 1838.

On 13 November 1851 the following decision was made by the Incumbered Estates Court- The Chief Commissioner sat in the Court, Henrietta-street, Dublin, to-day, for the purpose of selling incumbered property. In the matter of the estates of Williams James Thomas GALBRAITH, owner. Ex parte Morgan CROFTON, petitioner. Lot 1, the house and demesne of Macken, and Drumbinnis, Keilagh, Druminisdill, Drumcartagh, and Drumcannon, county of Cavan, containing £74. 0r. 15p. state measure, held in fee farm, producing a gross annual rental of £484, 11s, 10d., subject to two fee farm rents, one of £131, 18s. 6d., and the other of £62, 6s. 2d. The biddings proceeded from £4000 to £5390, at which sum Mrs. Elizabeth GALBRAITH became the purchaser. Lot 2, the fee simple lands of EVLAGHMORE, containing 140s. 1. 39p. statute measure, and producing an annual rental of £76, 11s, 8d. The first offer was £700., and Mr. W. Galbraith (the owner) was the purchaser for £1000.

Griffith's Valuation of 1857 lists seven landholders in the townland.

The landlord of most of Drumcartagh in the 19th century was Captain John Johnston.

== Census ==
Year	Population	Males	Females	Total Houses	Uninhabited
1841	44	25	19	9	0
1851	33	16	17	6	1
1861	36	19	17	6	0
1871	34	14	20	6	0
1881	18	9	9	5	0
1891	19	10	9	4	0

In the 1901 census of Ireland, there were five families listed in the townland.

In the 1911 census of Ireland, there were four families listed in the townland.

== Antiquities ==
A prehistoric or early medieval musical trumpet was found at Drumcartagh in the 19th century.
