= Makief =

Townland in County Cavan, Ireland

Makief (Irish derived place name, Magh Caoimh meaning ‘The Beautiful Plain’.) is a townland in the civil parish of Kildallan, barony of Tullyhunco, County Cavan, Ireland. It is also called Hill or ‘The Hill’.

== Geography ==
Makief is bounded on the north by Mullaghdoo, Cavan townland, on the west by Drummany townland, on the south by Coragh and Laheen townlands and on the east by Drumgoohy townland. Its chief geographical features are Patterson's Lough (which is named after John Patterson of Hill House who owned the townland in the early 19th century), small streams and a wood. Makief is traversed by minor public roads and rural lanes. The townland covers 98 acres.

== History ==
From medieval times up to the early 1600s, the land belonged to the McKiernan Clan. Up until the 1650s, Makief formed part of Aghabane townland and its history is the same until then.

An Inquisition held at Ballyconnell on 2 November 1629 stated that the poll of Taghabane, owned by Sir James Craig, contained six sub-divisions which included one named Mackeif. Sir James Craig died in the siege of Croaghan Castle on 8 April 1642. His land was inherited by his brother John Craig of Craig Castle, County Cavan and of Craigston, County Leitrim, who was chief doctor to both King James I and Charles I. Lord John Carmichael (1710–1787), the 4th Earl of Hyndford of Castle Craig, County Cavan, inherited the lands from the Craig estate.

The 1790 Cavan Carvaghs list spells the townland name as Makeef.

The 1825 Tithe Applotment Books list three tithepayers in the townland.

In 1832 one person in Hill was registered as a keeper of weapons- John Patterson, who had one gun and one blunderbuss.

The Makief Valuation Office books are available for 1838.

Griffith's Valuation of 1857 lists one landholder in the townland.

== Census ==
Year	Population	Males	Females	Total Houses	Uninhabited
1841	41	22	19	7	0
1851	4	2	2	2	1
1861	4	2	2	1	0
1871	4	2	2	2	1
1881	14	6	8	2	0
1891	15	7	8	2	0

In the 1901 census of Ireland, there were three families listed in the townland.

In the 1911 census of Ireland, there were four families listed in the townland.

== Antiquities ==
1. The Hill House
