= Laheen =

Townland in County Cavan, Ireland

Laheen (Irish derived place name, Loch Caoin meaning 'The Beautiful Lake' (referring to Patterson’s Lough in the townland).) is a townland in the civil parish of Killashandra, barony of Tullyhunco, County Cavan, Ireland.

== Geography ==
Laheen is bounded on the north by Makief townland, on the west by Drumcrow North, Drummany and Dunaweel townlands and on the east by Coragh and Derreskit townlands. Its chief geographical features are Patterson’s Lough (which is named after John Patterson of Hill House who owned the townland in the early 19th century), the Cullies River, small streams, a gravel pit, spring wells and a wood. Laheen is traversed by the local L1520 road, minor public roads and rural lanes. The townland covers 241 acres.

== History ==
From medieval times up to the early 1600s, the land belonged to the McKiernan Clan.

The 1609 Plantation of Ulster Map depicts the townland as Loghchin. A grant of 1610 spells the name as Loughchinn. A lease of 1611 spells the name as Laghin. An inquisition of 1629 spells the name as Raghin. The 1652 Commonwealth Survey spells it as Laghine. In the Plantation of Ulster King James VI and I by grant dated 27 June 1610, granted the Manor of Keylagh, which included one poll in Loughchinn, to John Achmootie, a Scottish Groom of the Bedchamber. His brother Alexander Achmootie was granted the neighbouring Manor of Dromheada. On 16 August 1610 John Aghmootie sold his lands in Tullyhunco to James Craig. On 1 May 1611 James Craig leased, 1 poll of Laghin to Eugene Boy O’Rely. On 29 July 1611 Arthur Chichester, 1st Baron Chichester and others reported that John Auchmothy and Alexander Auchmothye have not appeared at the lands awarded to them. James Craige is their deputy for five years, who has brought 4 artificers of divers sorts with their wives and families and 2 other servants. Stone raised for building a mill and trees felled, a walled house with a smith's forge built, 4 horses and mares upon the grounds with competent arms. An Inquisition held at Ballyconnell on 2 November 1629 stated that the poll of Raghin contained six sub-divisions named- Dromchroe, Killcryn, Rissin, Gartingallenowtragh, Knockduffe and Leggmoyen. Sir James Craig died in the siege of Croaghan Castle on 8 April 1642. His land was inherited by his brother John Craig of Craig Castle, County Cavan and of Craigston, County Leitrim, who was chief doctor to both King James I and Charles I.

The 1652 Commonwealth Survey states the owner was Lewis Craig and it is described as wasteland. In the Hearth Money Rolls compiled on 29 September 1663 there were two Hearth Tax payers in Lacheen- Farrell McKernan and Donogh Baccachan. Lord John Carmichael (1710–1787), the 4th Earl of Hyndford of Castle Craig, County Cavan, inherited the lands from the Craig estate. In 1758 Carmichael sold the lands to the Farnham Estate of Cavan. The estate papers are now in the National Library of Ireland and those papers mentioning Laheen are at reference numbers MS 41,114 /7; MS 41,114 /17; 21. F. 118/34 and 21. F. 118/42.

The 1790 Cavan Carvaghs list spells the townland name as Lachin. The 1825 Tithe Applotment Books list eight tithepayers in the townland.

In 1829 a Sunday school was kept in the townland, funded by the Hibernian Sunday School Society. The Laheen Valuation Office books are available for 1837-1838. The 1841 census of Ireland lists thirty-seven families in the townland.

Griffith's Valuation of 1857 lists thirteen landholders in the townland. The 1901 census of Ireland lists seven families in the townland. The 1911 census of Ireland lists three families in the townland.

== Antiquities ==
1. A Ford across the Cullies River
