= Keilagh =

Townland in County Cavan, Ireland

Keilagh (Irish derived place name, Caol Achadh meaning 'The Narrow Field'.) is a townland in the civil parish of Kildallan, barony of Tullyhunco, County Cavan, Ireland. It is sometimes confused with the nearby townland of Keelagh in which the town of Killeshandra is situate.

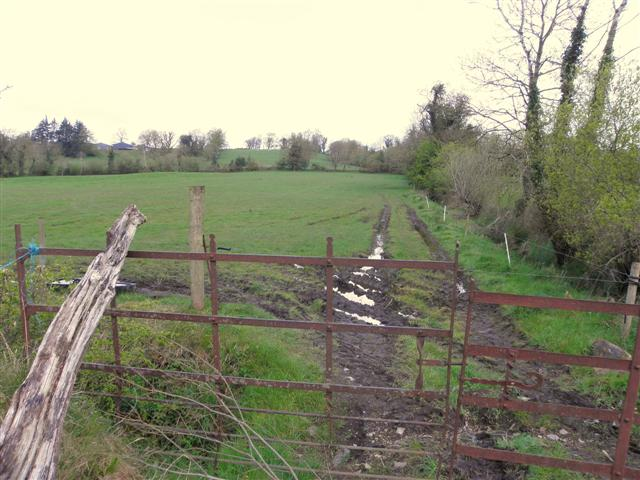
Keilagh Townland (geograph 2915442)

== Geography ==
Keilagh is bounded on the north by Claragh, Claraghpottle Glebe and Clonkeen townlands, on the west by Mackan townland, on the south by Drumbinnis and Druminiskill townlands and on the east by Drumcanon townland. Its chief geographical features are small streams, a quarry, a gravel pit and a dug well. Keilagh is traversed by minor public roads and rural lanes. The townland covers 166 acres.

== History ==
From medieval times up to the early 1600s, the land belonged to the McKiernan Clan.

The 1609 Plantation of Ulster Map depicts the townland as Keylagh. A grant of 1610 spells the name as Keylagh. A lease of 1611 spells the name as Keylough. An inquisition of 1629 spells the name as Keylagh. The 1652 Commonwealth Survey spells it as Killagh.

In the Plantation of Ulster King James VI and I by grant dated 27 June 1610, granted the Manor of Keylagh, which included one poll in Keylagh (after which townland the entire Manor was named), to John Achmootie, a Scottish Groom of the Bedchamber. His brother Alexander Achmootie was granted the neighbouring Manor of Dromheada. On 16 August 1610 John Aghmootie sold his lands in Tullyhunco to James Craig. On 1 May 1611 James Craig leased, inter alia, 1 poll of Keylough to McKernan. On 29 July 1611 Arthur Chichester, 1st Baron Chichester and others reported that John Auchmothy and Alexander Auchmothye have not appeared at the lands awarded to them. James Craige is their deputy for five years, who has brought 4 artificers of divers sorts with their wives and families and 2 other servants. Stone raised for building a mill and trees felled, a walled house with a smith's forge built, 4 horses and mares upon the grounds with competent arms. An Inquisition held at Ballyconnell on 2 November 1629 stated that the poll of Keylagh contained seven sub-divisions named Toynelodabraranie, Knockelinahan, Gortinagripp, Moneneweek, Rassorin, Townelubban and Monynshellagagh. Sir James Craig died in the siege of Croaghan Castle on 8 April 1642. His land was inherited by his brother John Craig of Craig Castle, County Cavan and of Craigston, County Leitrim, who was chief doctor to both King James I and Charles I.

The 1652 Commonwealth Survey states the owner was Lady Craig. A grant dated 30 January 1668 from King Charles II of England to James Thornton included a 1/2 poll containing 124 acres 1 rood and 8 perches in Kealagh.

The 1790 Cavan Carvaghs list spells the townland name as Kilagh.

The 1825 Tithe Applotment Books list nine tithepayers in the townland.

The Keilagh Valuation Office books are available for 1838.

Griffith's Valuation of 1857 lists ten landholders in the townland.

On 13 November 1851 the following decision was made by the Incumbered Estates Court- The Chief Commissioner sat in the Court, Henrietta-street, Dublin, to-day, for the purpose of selling incumbered property. In the matter of the estates of Williams James Thomas GALBRAITH, owner. Ex parte Morgan CROFTON, petitioner. Lot 1, the house and demesne of Macken, and Drumbinnis, Keilagh, Druminisdill, Drumcartagh, and Drumcannon, county of Cavan, containing £74. 0r. 15p. state measure, held in fee farm, producing a gross annual rental of £484, 11s, 10d., subject to two fee farm rents, one of £131, 18s. 6d., and the other of £62, 6s. 2d. The biddings proceeded from £4000 to £5390, at which sum Mrs. Elizabeth GALBRAITH became the purchaser. Lot 2, the fee simple lands of EVLAGHMORE, containing 140s. 1. 39p. statute measure, and producing an annual rental of £76, 11s, 8d. The first offer was £700., and Mr. W. Galbraith (the owner) was the purchaser for £1000.

In the 19th century the landlord of most of Keilagh was Captain John Johnston.

== Census ==
Year	Population	Males	Females	Total Houses	Uninhabited
1841	57	28	29	10	0
1851	42	20	22	9	1
1861	33	18	15	6	1
1871	36	17	19	6	0
1881	26	12	14	6	0
1891	29	12	17	6	1

In the 1901 census of Ireland, there were five families listed in the townland.

In the 1911 census of Ireland, there were six families listed in the townland.

== Antiquities ==
1. An earthen ringfort. The Archaeological Survey of Cavan states- Raised oval area (int. dims. 37m NNE-SSW; 32m WNW-ESE) enclosed by two earthen banks with outer fosses. The inner bank and fosse have been largely levelled as have the outer bank and fosse from N-E-SSW. Original entrance was probably at South.
