= Coragh =

Townland in County Cavan, Ireland

Coragh (Irish derived place name, Currach meaning ‘The Moor’.) is a townland in the civil parish of Kildallan, barony of Tullyhunco, County Cavan, Ireland.

== Geography ==
Coragh is bounded on the north by Drumgoohy townland, on the west by Laheen and Makief townlands and on the east by Aghabane, Derreskit and Derrindrehid townlands. Its chief geographical features are Coragh Hill which reaches to a height of 269 feet, Patterson’s Lough (which is named after John Patterson of Hill House who owned the townland of Makief in the early 19th century), small streams and a spring well. Coragh is traversed by minor public roads and rural lanes. The townland covers 128 acres.

== History ==
Up until the 1650s, Coragh formed part of the townland of Disert, Tullyhunco and its history is the same until then. A 1629 Inquisition spells the name as Corrach and Disert-Corrogh. The 1652 Commonwealth Survey spells the name as Corgagh.

From medieval times up to the early 1600s, the land belonged to the McKiernan Clan.

An Inquisition held at Cavan on 10 June 1629 stated that the poll of Disert, owned by Sir Alexander Hamilton, contained two sub-divisions, one of which was named Corrach. It also described the boundary of Disert as- half a pole meered all upon the southe and east by the logh and river, and upon the north, boundinge upon the Croghin, by a boge betwixt the river and the logh on the west, and from that logh over to the logh and river upon the west side, by an edge betwixt Tachubane, Disert-Corrogh and Corredomahe; the other half pole of Disert bounding to the Rushskein and Leachin, on the south, thorowe a boge to a logh, and bounding upon the west to Machie thorowe a woode on drye grounde to Tachabane, on the north and east meered by a boge and runninge brooke into the river, belowe the foorde of Bellaghinfin.

The 1652 Commonwealth Survey states the owner was Sir Francis Hamilton.

In the Hearth Money Rolls compiled on 29 September 1663 there was one Hearth Tax payer in Coragh- Mortagh McKeny.

The 1790 Cavan Carvaghs list spells the townland name as Coragh.

Ambrose Leet's 1814 Directory spells the name as Coragh.

The 1825 Tithe Applotment Books list seven tithepayers in the townland.

The Coragh Valuation Office books are available for April 1838.

Griffith's Valuation of 1857 lists six landholders in the townland.

The landlord of Coragh in the 19th century was Hugh Wallace.

== Census ==
Year	Population	Males	Females	Total Houses	Uninhabited
1841	58	31	27	11	0
1851	40	23	17	8	0
1861	31	20	11	7	1
1871	33	18	15	8	1
1881	28	13	15	6	0
1891	19	12	7	6	1

In the 1901 census of Ireland, there are five families listed in the townland.

In the 1911 census of Ireland, there are four families listed in the townland.

== Antiquities ==
1. A wooden bridge.
