= Drumbagh =

Townland in County Cavan, Ireland

- Townland
- Location in Ireland
- Coordinates: 54°02′35″N 7°32′13″W
- Country: Ireland
- County: County Cavan
- Parish: Kildallan

Drumbagh (Irish derived place name, Droim Beach meaning ‘The Hill-Ridge of the Bees’.) is a townland in the civil parish of Kildallan, barony of Tullyhunco, County Cavan, Ireland.

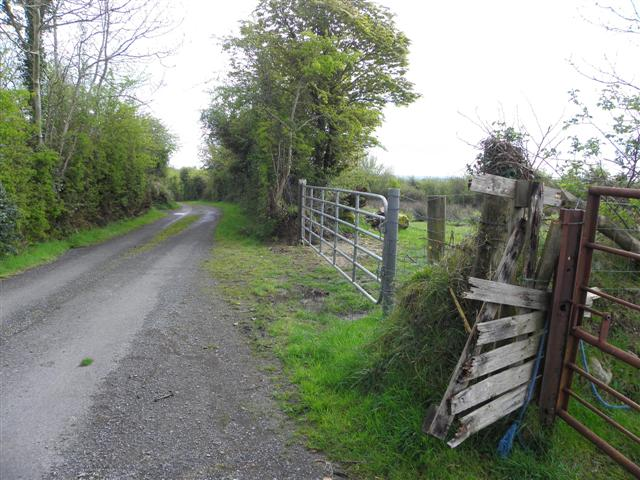
Road at Drumbagh (geograph 2915458)

== Geography ==
Drumbagh is bounded on the north by Bocade Glebe and Feugh (Bishops) townlands, on the west by Drumcartagh townland, on the south by Drummully West townland and on the east by Drumbo (Tullyhunco) townland. Its chief geographical features are small streams and a spring well. Drumbagh is traversed by minor public roads and rural lanes. The townland covers 49 acres.

== History ==
From medieval times up to the early 1600s, the land belonged to the McKiernan Clan.

A 1629 Inquisition spells the name as Drombeach. The 1652 Commonwealth Survey spells it as Drombee.

Up until the 1650s, Drumbagh formed part of the present-day townland of Drummully West and its history is the same till then.

In the Plantation of Ulster King James VI and I by grant dated 23 July 1610 granted the Manor of Clonyn or Taghleagh, which included the two polls of Dromoligh (now comprising the townlands of Drummully East, Drummully West and Drumbagh), to Sir Alexander Hamilton of Innerwick, Scotland. On 29 July 1611 Arthur Chichester, 1st Baron Chichester and others reported that- Sir Alexander Hamilton, Knt, 2,000 acres in the county of Cavan; has not appeared: his son Claud took possession, and brought three servants and six artificers; is in hand with building a mill; trees felled; raised stones and hath competitent arms in readiness. Besides there are arrived upon that portion since our return to Dublin from the journey, as we are informed, twelve tenants and artificers who intend to reside there and build upon the same. An Inquisition held at Cavan on 10 June 1629 stated that the 2 polls called Dromoligh are otherwise called Drumwillies and that they contained eight sub-divisions, one of which was named Drombeach. It also described the boundary of the townland as- Drommaleigh bounding upon the south to Croghin, meered thorow a greate boige, and upon the north to the Feache, meered thorowe a greate boige, and upon the west bounding to Drummenuskilan, meered by a runninge brooke.

The 1652 Commonwealth Survey lists the owner as Sir Francis Hamilton and describes it as wasteland.

The 1825 Tithe Applotment Books list five tithepayers in the townland.

The Drumbagh Valuation Office books are available for April 1838.

Griffith's Valuation of 1857 lists six landholders in the townland.

The landlord of Drumbagh in the 19th century was Hugh Wallace.

== Census ==
Year	Population	Males	Females	Total Houses	Uninhabited
1841	46	24	22	8	0
1851	29	16	39	6	1
1861	20	9	11	4	0
1871	20	11	9	4	0
1881	20	11	9	4	0
1891	22	12	10	4	0

In the 1901 census of Ireland, there were five families listed in the townland.

In the 1911 census of Ireland, there were five families listed in the townland.
