= Newtowngore =

Village in County Leitrim, Ireland

Newtowngore An Dúcharraig
- Village
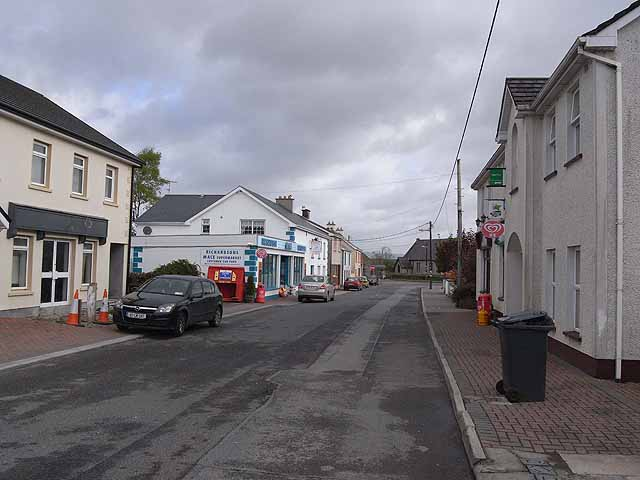
- Shop and post office in Newtowngore

- Location in Ireland
- Coordinates: 54°02′35″N 7°40′23″W
- Country: Ireland
- Province: Connacht
- County: County Leitrim
- Time zone: UTC+0 (WET)
  - Summer (DST): UTC-1 (IST (WEST))

Newtowngore or Newtown Gore, known before the Plantations of Ireland as Ducarrick (Irish: An Dúcharraig, meaning 'the black rock'), is a village on the R199 regional road in the south-east of County Leitrim. The village is in the north of the parish of Carrigallen.

== History ==
=== Early history ===
There is evidence of a number of ringforts in the immediate vicinity of the village, in the townlands of Carrickateane, Mullyaster, Tully North and Killydrum.

According to the 9th-century Tripartite Life of St Patrick, when Saint Patrick was on his way to Magh Slecht to destroy Crom Cruaich, he founded a church and ordained a priest named Bruscus to look after it. The site of this Patrician church is thought to have been near Newtowngore. The ruins in the grounds of the present Church of Ireland church in Newtowngore are likely the medieval church of Moy, which was dedicated to Saint Patrick. Apart from this, nothing is known of the early ecclesiastical history of Carrigallen. There are two holy wells dedicated to the saint, one in Aughawillan and the second in Beaghmore. Nearby, the latter is a wart stone where people used to make the cure of the warts by washing them in the water which lay in a hollow in the stone in Moy Abbey in 1345.

=== 19th century ===
As of the mid-19th century, and as recorded in Samuel Lewis's Topographical Dictionary of Ireland (1837), the parish was then made up of 1,500 statute acres, including a "great quantity of bog". At that time, the village contained about 100 houses and had a "market for grain and provisions on Monday" with fairs "held in April, 4 May, 9 August, 8 October, and the last Friday in December". Throughout at least the 19th and 20th centuries, a number of fair days were held at Newtowngore on- 25 February, 25 May, 26 June (or 28th), 25 August, 15 October, and 25 November.

As of the mid-19th century, there was "penny post to Killeshandra and Ballinamore; and a constabulary police force [had] been stationed here".

=== Woodford Estate ===
Woodford (Estate) Collins – Robert Collins was the lessor of several townlands in the parishes of Drumreilly and Oughteragh, baronies of Carrigallen and Mohill, at the time of Griffith's Valuation.

(Estate) de Courcey – The de Courcey family held land in the parish of Drumreilly, barony of Dromahaire, in the mid-nineteenth century.

The de Courcey family held land in the parish of Drumreilly, barony of Dromahaire in the mid-nineteenth century.

(Estate) Palmer (Leitrim) – The Palmer family were resident at Sriff or Shriff from at least the end of the eighteenth century. They held lands in the parishes of Drumlease and Drumreilly, barony of Dromahaire in the mid-nineteenth century. Henry Manly Palmer of Sriff was a member of the Grand Jury for Leitrim in 1851. Isabella Palmer of Drumkeel is recorded as owning over 1,300 acres (5.3 km^{2}) in Leitrim in 1876. Thomas Robert Palmer, living at Friarstown in the 1870s, owned over 1,600 acres (6.5 km^{2}) in County Leitrim at that time. This family intermarried with the Cullen family of County Leitrim on a number of occasions.

== Amenities ==
Newtowngore has a Church of Ireland church (dedicated to Saint Patrick), a national (primary) school, a small number of shops, and (as of early 2019) a post office.

== Public transport ==
Bus Éireann route 462 serves the village on Saturdays providing a link to Sligo via Ballinamore and Drumshanbo.

== See also ==
- List of towns and villages in Ireland
