= Drumbo (Tullyhunco) =

Townland in County Cavan, Ireland

Drumbo (Irish derived place name, Droim Bó meaning 'The Hill-Ridge of the Cows'.) is a townland in the civil parish of Kildallan, barony of Tullyhunco, County Cavan, Ireland.

== Geography ==
Drumbo is bounded on the north by Feugh (Bishops) townland, on the west by Drumbagh and Drummully West townlands, on the south by Drummully East townland and on the east by Gorteen (Gorteenagarry) townland. Its chief geographical features are small streams and a well. Drumbo is traversed by the local L5503 road, minor public roads and rural lanes. The townland covers 157 acres.

== History ==
From medieval times up to the early 1600s, the land belonged to the McKiernan Clan.

The 1609 Plantation of Ulster Map depicts the townland as Drombo. A government grant of 1610 spells the name as Drombo. A 1629 Inquisition spells the name as Drombo and Dromboe.

In the Plantation of Ulster King James VI and I by grant dated 23 July 1610 granted the Manor of Clonyn or Taghleagh, which included one poll of Drombo, to Sir Alexander Hamilton of Innerwick, Scotland. On 29 July 1611 Arthur Chichester, 1st Baron Chichester and others reported that- Sir Alexander Hamilton, Knt, 2,000 acres in the county of Cavan; has not appeared: his son Claud took possession, and brought three servants and six artificers; is in hand with building a mill; trees felled; raised stones and hath competitent arms in readiness. Besides there are arrived upon that portion since our return to Dublin from the journey, as we are informed, twelve tenants and artificers who intend to reside there and build upon the same. An Inquisition held at Cavan on 10 June 1629 stated that the poll of Drombo contained four sub-divisions named Shanwillebanne, Coultubber, Achininvekille and Achinnebrouke. It also described the boundary of the townland as- bounding upon the Feach on the north, meered thorow a greate boge.

In the Hearth Money Rolls compiled on 29 September 1663 there was one Hearth Tax payer in Drombo- James Moore.

The 1790 Cavan Carvaghs list spells the townland name as Drumboe.

The 1825 Tithe Applotment Books list ten tithepayers in the townland.

In 1832 one person in Drumboe was registered as a keeper of weapons- Joshua Finlay who had one gun and one pistol.

The Drumbo Valuation Office books are available for April 1838.

Griffith's Valuation of 1857 lists eleven landholders in the townland.

The landlord of Drumbo in the 19th century was Hugh Wallace.

== Census ==
| Year | Population | Males | Females | Total Houses | Uninhabited |
|---|---|---|---|---|---|
| 1841 | 68 | 40 | 28 | 12 | 0 |
| 1851 | 53 | 32 | 21 | 10 | 0 |
| 1861 | 57 | 28 | 29 | 10 | 0 |
| 1871 | 50 | 29 | 21 | 10 | 0 |
| 1881 | 41 | 23 | 18 | 8 | 0 |
| 1891 | 33 | 18 | 15 | 6 | 0 |

In the 1901 census of Ireland, there were six families listed in the townland.

In the 1911 census of Ireland, there were seven families listed in the townland.

== Antiquities ==
1. A holy well call Tobar Patrick (St. Patrick’s Well). The townland sub-division Coultubber means the 'Corner of the Well'. The Archaeological Survey of County Cavan states- Marked on all OS eds. Dense growth of vegetation precluded investigation of the site. Situated in low-lying ground adjacent to a stream. The 1937 Dúchas folklore collection states- Tobar Padraig. This well is situated between the townlands of Drumbo and Drummully, Killeshandra, Co. Cavan, and in the parish of Kildallon. It is situated on the left hand side of the road leading from Glasstown to Drummully. It is at a place called the "Broad Slap" near the Drumbagh road. It is partly surrounded by a thick hedge of large bushes. There is an opening to the well from the road. There are ten steps leading down to it. The water has covered two of them. The well is about five feet deep, and six feet wide. It never goes dry. The water is coming from the rock, at the back of the well. St. Patrick is the Saint connected with it. It is said that he shook his staff at it while he was passing. It is also said that a mass was celebrated at the rock, during the Penal Days. There used to be rounds and prayers done at it long ago. At first, the well was on the opposite side of the road. It is said that a woman washed her feet in this well, and that it dried up. Another well burst forth where the well is at present. It is said that there was a cure for rheumatism, and other pains in it. There is the trace of an altar on a rock near the well.
