= Cornaclea =

Townland in County Cavan, Ireland

Cornaclea (Irish derived place name, Corr na Cléithe meaning 'The Round-Hill of the Palisade'.) is a townland in the civil parish of Kildallan, barony of Tullyhunco, County Cavan, Ireland. It is also called Tawlagh (Irish derived place name, Tamhlacht meaning ‘The Plague-Grave’).

== Geography ==
Cornaclea is bounded on the north by Drummully East townland, on the west by Coolnashinny and Shancroaghan townlands and on the east by Derrygid townland. Its chief geographical features are Dumb Lough, Town Lake, the Castle River and small streams. Cornaclea is traversed by minor public roads and rural lanes. The townland covers 63 acres.

== History ==
From medieval times up to the early 1600s, the land belonged to the McKiernan Clan.

The 1609 Plantation of Ulster Map depicts the townland as Taulaght. A government grant of 1610 spells the name as Towlaght. A 1629 Inquisition spells the name as Tawlaght and Carclea. The 1652 Commonwealth Survey spells the name as Tawlaght.

In the Plantation of Ulster King James VI and I by grant dated 23 July 1610 granted the Manor of Clonyn or Taghleagh, which included one poll of Towlaght, to Sir Alexander Hamilton of Innerwick, Scotland. On 29 July 1611 Arthur Chichester, 1st Baron Chichester and others reported that- Sir Alexander Hamilton, Knt, 2,000 acres in the county of Cavan; has not appeared: his son Claud took possession, and brought three servants and six artificers; is in hand with building a mill; trees felled; raised stones and hath competitent arms in readiness. Besides there are arrived upon that portion since our return to Dublin from the journey, as we are informed, twelve tenants and artificers who intend to reside there and build upon the same. An Inquisition held at Cavan on 10 June 1629 stated that the poll of Tawlaght contained four sub-divisions named Coulnahinsin, Carclea, Curragh and Coulnemuckelagh. It also described the boundary of the townland as- bounding upon Snakeill on the east, from the river, on the south, over thorowe the woods betwixt Coulnachuissin and Snakeill to a boge and a mosse on the north, and upon the south boundinge to Shancrahim meered thorow a greate boge.

The 1652 Commonwealth Survey lists the owner as Sir Francis Hamilton.

The 1790 Cavan Carvaghs list spells the townland name as Tawlagh.

The 1825 Tithe Applotment Books list one tithepayer in the townland.

The Cornaclea Valuation Office books are available for April 1838.

There is an estate map and detailed description of Cornaclea in 1849.

Griffith's Valuation of 1857 lists one landholder in the townland.

The landlord of Cornaclea in the 19th century was James Hamilton.

== Census ==
Year	Population	Males	Females	Total Houses	Uninhabited
1841	9	6	3	2	0
1851	4	3	1	1	0
1861	3	2	1	1	0
1871	3	2	1	1	0
1881	6	4	2	1	0
1891	8	3	5	1	0

In the 1901 census of Ireland, there is one family listed in the townland.

In the 1911 census of Ireland, there is one family listed in the townland.
