= Drumbinnis =

Townland in County Cavan, Ireland

- Townland
- Location in Ireland
- Coordinates: 54°02′10″N 7°33′45″W
- Country: Ireland
- County: County Cavan
- Parish: Kildallan

Drumbinnis (Irish derived place name, Droim Binnis meaning either ‘The Pleasant Hill-Ridge’ or ‘The Hill-Ridge of Melody’ or Droim Bainis meaning ‘The Hill-Ridge of the Banquet’.) is a townland in the civil parish of Kildallan, barony of Tullyhunco, County Cavan, Ireland.

== Geography ==
Drumbinnis is bounded on the north by Keilagh and Mackan townlands, on the west by Mullaghdoo, Cavan townland, on the south by Drumgoohy townland and on the east by Druminiskill and Killygowan townlands. Its chief geographical features are small streams, a forestry plantation, a sand pit and a spring well. Drumbinnis is traversed by minor public roads and rural lanes. The townland covers 90 acres.

== History ==
From medieval times up to the early 1600s, the land belonged to the McKiernan Clan. Up until the 1650s, Drumbinnis formed part of Coolnashinny or Croaghan townland and its history is the same until then.

An inquisition of 1629 spells the name as Drombivise. The 1652 Commonwealth Survey spells it as Drombinis.

An Inquisition held at Ballyconnell on 2 November 1629 stated that Sir James Craig owned the four polls of Craghan which contained, inter alia, a sub-division named Drombivise. Sir James Craig died in the siege of Croaghan Castle on 8 April 1642. His land was inherited by his brother John Craig of Craig Castle, County Cavan and of Craigston, County Leitrim, who was chief doctor to both King James I and Charles I.

The 1652 Commonwealth Survey states the owner was Lady Craig.

A marriage settlement dated 7 March 1750 relates to the Faris family with lands in Drumbinniss etc.

The 1790 Cavan Carvaghs list spells the townland name as Drombinis.

The 1825 Tithe Applotment Books list three tithepayers in the townland.

The Drumbinnis Valuation Office books are available for April 1838.

On 13 November 1851 the following decision was made by the Incumbered Estates Court- The Chief Commissioner sat in the Court, Henrietta-street, Dublin, to-day, for the purpose of selling incumbered property. In the matter of the estates of Williams James Thomas GALBRAITH, owner. Ex parte Morgan CROFTON, petitioner. Lot 1, the house and demesne of Macken, and Drumbinnis, Keilagh, Druminisdill, Drumcartagh, and Drumcannon, county of Cavan, containing £74. 0r. 15p. state measure, held in fee farm, producing a gross annual rental of £484, 11s, 10d., subject to two fee farm rents, one of £131, 18s. 6d., and the other of £62, 6s. 2d. The biddings proceeded from £4000 to £5390, at which sum Mrs. Elizabeth GALBRAITH became the purchaser. Lot 2, the fee simple lands of EVLAGHMORE, containing 140s. 1. 39p. statute measure, and producing an annual rental of £76, 11s, 8d. The first offer was £700., and Mr. W. Galbraith (the owner) was the purchaser for £1000.

Griffith's Valuation of 1857 lists five landholders in the townland.

In the 19th century the landlord of Drumbinnis was Captain John Johnston.

== Census ==
Year	Population	Males	Females	Total Houses	Uninhabited
1841	12	6	6	2	0
1851	16	9	7	5	0
1861	15	10	5	3	1
1871	5	3	2	1	0
1881	8	5	3	1	0
1891	7	3	4	1	0

In the 1901 census of Ireland, there was one family listed in the townland.

In the 1911 census of Ireland, there was one family listed in the townland.
