= Claraghpottle Glebe =

Townland in Carn, County Cavan, Ireland

Claraghpottle Glebe (Irish and English derived place name, Clárach Poitéil meaning 'The Level Place of the Quarter Townland' and Glebe meaning 'Land for the Upkeep of the Church'.) is a townland in the civil parish of Kildallan, barony of Tullyhunco, County Cavan, Ireland.

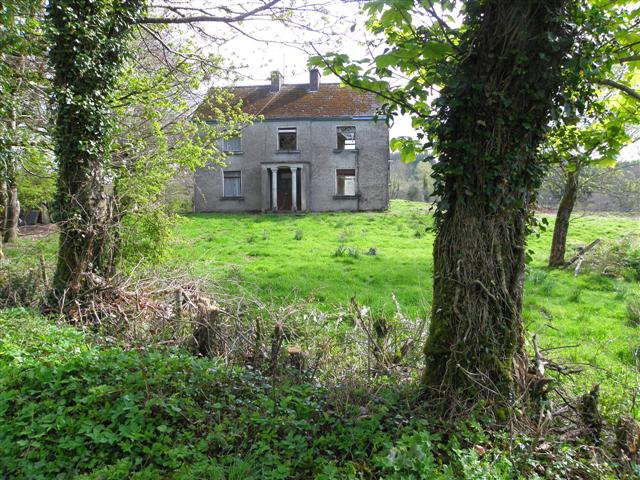
Derelict house, Claraghpottle (geograph 2915445)

== Geography ==
Claraghpottle Glebe is bounded on the north by Claragh townland, on the west by Keilagh townland, on the south by Drumcanon townland and on the east by Bocade Glebe townland. Its chief geographical features are a gravel pit, small streams and a spring well. It is traversed by minor public roads and rural lanes. The townland covers 40 acres.

== History ==
From medieval times up to the early 1600s, the land belonged to the McKiernan Clan.

The 1609 Plantation of Ulster Map depicts it as part of the townland of Clarhagh. A grant of 1610 spells the name as One fourth of the poll of Clarhagh. A lease of 1611 spells the name as Clovagh. A grant of 1627 spells the name as Clarhagh. The 1652 Commonwealth Survey spells it as Cleighragh. The 1665 Down Survey map depicts it as Pottles Claragh. William Petty's map of 1685 depicts it as Clara Pottles.

In the Plantation of Ulster King Charles I of England by grant dated 25 January 1627, granted, inter alia, a fourth part of the pole of Clarhagh, to Martin Baxter, the Church of Ireland rector of Kildallan and Tomregan. Martin Baxter was the first Church of Ireland rector of Kildallan and Tomregan parish and since then the townland has passed down as part of the glebe lands belonging to the Rectory of Kildallan. He held the post from 1 November 1626 until March 1642 when he died of pestilential fever at Sir James Craig's besieged castle at Croaghan, Killeshandra. In a deposition dated 22 September 1642 about the Irish Rebellion of 1641 in Cavan, Martin Baxter's son, William Baxter, stated, inter alia- William Baxter late of Rathmoran in the halfe Barony of Clankelly and County of ffarmannagh, gent, eldest sonne and heire apparent of Martin Baxter late of Carndallan in the County of Cavan, Clarke deceased: being duily sworne and examined, deposeth & saith that on the 23 day of October last, this deponent's said father was lawfully possessed as in his owne right as of his owne proper goods of and in six-score head of Catle in the mannour of Armagh on the lands of Rathmoran in the County of ffarmannagh worth £180, of 20 horses and mares worth £40, of howsehould Stuffe at Rathmoran aforsaid worth £10, of Corne sowne worth £100, of corne in the hagyard at Rathmoran aforsaid worth £30, of debts & areares of rent in the said County due from such as are in rebellion or robbed by the Rebells and unable to make satisfacteon £48... This deponent further saith that his said father was robbed and dispoiled in the County of Cavan by the Rebells, his neghbours at and of the land of the Carne of househould goods to the value of £40, corne in the Hagyard £100, horses worth £25, Cowes worth £30, but the names and number of the rebells that soe robbed him he knoweth not, for that he, this deponent, hearing of theyr approch before, they came to the Carne aforesaid fledd away. This deponent further saith that his father's bookes being worth about £40 were carried to the house of Denish o Shraiden, minister Clerke in the said Countie where hee feareth they will be lost, and never recovered out of that Rebellious County, and that hee this deponent left in the County of Cavan at the house of James Gray of the said towne of Cauan at such time as this deponent with others bee plate which hee had made up in the cariages of one that came out of the said Castle but turned backe worth 10 s. This deponent further saith that their was taken from his unckele, John Warren of Belturbet, as he was comming towards Dublin neare the Cavan, cloath stuffe and wearing apparrell belonging to this deponent and his sister worth £10 soe that his whole certayne losses in the County of Cauan susteyned amounteth to £280. 10 s. in both Counties to £1048 verily feareth he shall susteyne to £583-10s. in all in that county to £197 of his uncertayne losses which he besides his losse of the rent of his lands till a peace be settled and which will not then answer to neare the value that it stands him in.

The 1652 Commonwealth Survey states the owner was the Church of Ireland, Gleabland.

The 1825 Tithe Applotment Books list two tithepayers in the townland.

The Claraghpottle Glebe Valuation Office books are available for April 1838.

Griffith's Valuation of 1857 lists one landholder in the townland.

== Census ==
Year	Population	Males	Females	Total Houses	Uninhabited
1841	22	14	8	4	0
1851	8	7	1	1	0
1861	7	4	3	1	0
1871	3	2	1	1	0
1881	10	4	6	2	0
1891	14	6	8	2	0

In the 1901 census of Ireland, there are two families listed in the townland.

In the 1911 census of Ireland, there are two families listed in the townland.
