= Bocade Glebe =

Townland in Country Cavan, Ireland

Bocade Glebe (Irish and English derived place name, 'Both Céad' meaning 'The Hut of the Land Division' and Glebe meaning 'Land for the Upkeep of the Church'.) is a townland in the civil parish of Kildallan, barony of Tullyhunco, County Cavan, Ireland.

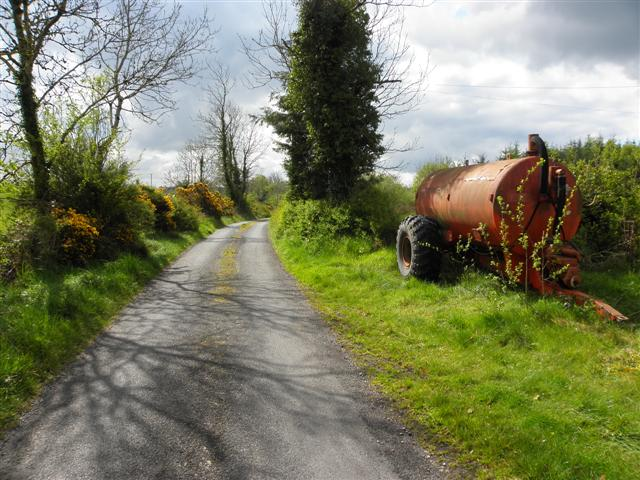
Road at Bocade (geograph 2915452)

== Geography ==
Bocade Glebe is bounded on the north by Kildallan townland and Listiernan townland, on the west by Claragh townland, on the south by Claraghpottle Glebe, Drumbagh, Drumcanon and Drumcartagh townlands and on the east by Feugh (Bishops) townland. Its chief geographical features are a forestry plantation, small streams, a gravel pit, a pond and spring wells. Bocade Glebe is traversed by minor public roads and rural lanes. The townland covers 269 acres.

== History ==
From medieval times up to the early 1600s, the land belonged to the McKiernan Clan.

The 1609 Plantation of Ulster Map depicts it as Boched. A grant of 1610 spells the name as Boched. A grant of 1627 spells the name as Boched. The 1641 Depositions spell the name as Bokedd. The 1652 Commonwealth Survey spells it as Bocheade. The 1665 Down Survey map depicts it as Boghead. William Petty's map of 1685 depicts it as Boghead.

In the Plantation of Ulster King Charles I of England by grant dated 25 January 1627, granted, inter alia, the poll of Boched, to Martin Baxter, the Church of Ireland rector of Kildallan and Tomregan. Martin Baxter was the first Church of Ireland rector of Kildallan and Tomregan parish and since then the townland has passed down as part of the glebe lands belonging to the Rectory of Kildallan. He held the post from 1 November 1626 until March 1642 when he died of pestilential fever at Sir James Craig's besieged castle at Croaghan, Killeshandra. In a deposition dated 22 September 1642 about the Irish Rebellion of 1641 in Cavan, Martin Baxter's son, William Baxter, stated, inter alia:

William Baxter late of Rathmoran in the halfe Barony of Clankelly and County of ffarmannagh, gent, eldest sonne and heire apparent of Martin Baxter late of Carndallan in the County of Cavan, Clarke deceased: being duily sworne and examined, deposeth & saith that on the 23 day of October last, this deponent's said father was lawfully possessed as in his owne right as of his owne proper goods of and in six-score head of Catle in the mannour of Armagh on the lands of Rathmoran in the County of ffarmannagh worth £180, of 20 horses and mares worth £40, of howsehould Stuffe at Rathmoran aforsaid worth £10, of Corne sowne worth £100, of corne in the hagyard at Rathmoran aforsaid worth £30, of debts & areares of rent in the said County due from such as are in rebellion or robbed by the Rebells and unable to make satisfacteon £48... This deponent further saith that his said father was robbed and dispoiled in the County of Cavan by the Rebells, his neghbours at and of the land of the Carne of househould goods to the value of £40, corne in the Hagyard £100, horses worth £25, Cowes worth £30, but the names and number of the rebells that soe robbed him he knoweth not, for that he, this deponent, hearing of theyr approch before, they came to the Carne aforesaid fledd away. This deponent further saith that his father's bookes being worth about £40 were carried to the house of Denish o Shraiden, minister Clerke in the said Countie where hee feareth they will be lost, and never recovered out of that Rebellious County, and that hee this deponent left in the County of Cavan at the house of James Gray of the said towne of Cauan at such time as this deponent with others bee plate which hee had made up in the cariages of one that came out of the said Castle but turned backe worth 10 s. This deponent further saith that their was taken from his unckele, John Warren of Belturbet, as he was comming towards Dublin neare the Cavan, cloath stuffe and wearing apparrell belonging to this deponent and his sister worth £10 soe that his whole certayne losses in the County of Cauan susteyned amounteth to £280. 10 s. in both Counties to £1048 verily feareth he shall susteyne to £583-10s. in all in that county to £197 of his uncertayne losses which he besides his losse of the rent of his lands till a peace be settled and which will not then answer to neare the value that it stands him in.

At Cavan, on 26 July 1642, Thomas and William Jones gave the names of rebel leaders in the Cavan Irish Rebellion of 1641, including Phillip mc Donell bane Rely of Bokedd and Owen mc Phillip Rely of same.

The 1652 Commonwealth Survey states the owner was the Church of Ireland, Gleabland

In the Hearth Money Rolls compiled on 29 September 1663 there were two Hearth Tax payers in Boked- Owen Farrelly and Phillip Reilly.

In the Cavan Poll Book of 1761, there was one person registered to vote in Bocade Glebe in the Irish general election, 1761: Reverend Walter Lyndsay, who was the Church of Ireland rector of Tomregan parish from 1758 to 1767. He was entitled to cast two votes. The four election candidates were Charles Coote, 1st Earl of Bellomont and Lord Newtownbutler (later Brinsley Butler, 2nd Earl of Lanesborough), both of whom were then elected Member of Parliament for Cavan County. The losing candidates were George Montgomery (MP) of Ballyconnell and Barry Maxwell, 1st Earl of Farnham. Absence from the poll book either meant a resident did not vote or, more likely, was not a freeholder entitled to vote, which would mean most of the inhabitants of Bocade Glebe.

The 1790 Cavan Carvaghs list spells the townland name as Boched.

Ambrose Leet's 1814 Directory spells the name as Bocade.

The 1825 Tithe Applotment Books list fifteen tithepayers in the townland.

The Bocade Glebe Valuation Office Field books are available for 1838.

Griffith's Valuation of 1857 lists twenty-nine landholders in the townland.

'Haphazard' is a book by Edward Joseph King (August 1894 – 13 November 1971) about growing up in Bocade Glebe with his siblings Marjory and Richard in the early 1900s where his father, Albert Edward King (1866 – 24 August 1938), was the Church of Ireland rector from 1899 to 1931 and later Dean of Kilmore.

== Census ==
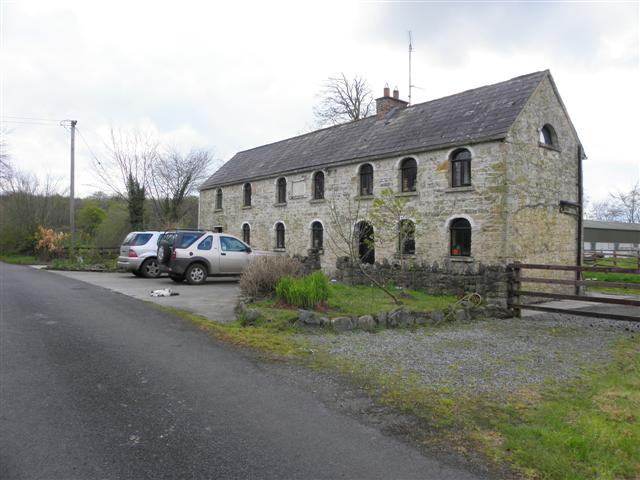
Old School House, Bocade Upper (geograph 2915449)

Year	Population	Males	Females	Total Houses	Uninhabited
1841	120	61	59	21	2
1851	100	49	51	20	0
1861	83	42	41	19	1
1871	65	31	34	15	0
1881	61	32	29	17	2
1891	63	32	31	16	1

In the 1901 census of Ireland, there are nineteen families listed in the townland.

In the 1911 census of Ireland, there are twenty families listed in the townland.

== Antiquities ==
1. Bocade Protestant School. Built c.1800.
2. Kildallan Glebe house, built 1816–1821.
