= Drummully East =

Townland in County Cavan, Ireland

Drummully East (Irish and English derived place name, Droim Mullaigh meaning ‘The Hill-Ridge of the Summit’, East meaning the eastern part of the original Drummully townland before it was sub-divided.) is a townland in the civil parish of Kildallan, barony of Tullyhunco, County Cavan, Ireland.

== Geography ==
Drummully East is bounded on the north by Drumbo (Tullyhunco) townland, on the west by Coolnashinny, Drummully West and Mullaghmullan townlands, on the south by Cornaclea and Shancroaghan townlands and on the east by Derrygid, Gorteen (Gorteenagarry) and Snakeel townlands. Its chief geographical features are Drummully Hill which reaches a height of 328 feet, Dumb Lough, the Castle River, small streams, small woods and spring wells. Drummully East is traversed by the regional R201 road (Ireland), the local L5503 road, minor public roads and rural lanes. The townland covers 212 acres, including 4 acres of water.

== History ==
From medieval times up to the early 1600s, the land belonged to the McKiernan Clan.

The 1609 Plantation of Ulster Map depicts the townland as Dromoligh. A government grant of 1610 spells the name as Dromoligh. A 1629 Inquisition spells the name as Dromoligh, Drommaleigh and Drumwillies. The 1652 Commonwealth Survey spells it as Dromuliig.

In the Plantation of Ulster King James VI and I by grant dated 23 July 1610 granted the Manor of Clonyn or Taghleagh, which included the two polls of Dromoligh (now comprising the townlands of Drummully East, Drummully West and Drumbagh), to Sir Alexander Hamilton of Innerwick, Scotland. On 29 July 1611 Arthur Chichester, 1st Baron Chichester and others reported that- Sir Alexander Hamilton, Knt, 2,000 acres in the county of Cavan; has not appeared: his son Claud took possession, and brought three servants and six artificers; is in hand with building a mill; trees felled; raised stones and hath competitent arms in readiness. Besides there are arrived upon that portion since our return to Dublin from the journey, as we are informed, twelve tenants and artificers who intend to reside there and build upon the same. An Inquisition held at Cavan on 10 June 1629 stated that the 2 polls called Dromoligh are otherwise called Drumwillies and that they contained eight sub-divisions named Choiscaple, Coulcovead, Leag, Ruddaghedrom, Dromacho, Drombeach, Tonerassin and Carriglas. It also described the boundary of the townland as- Drommaleigh bounding upon the south to Croghin, meered thorow a greate boige, and upon the north to the Feache, meered thorowe a greate boige, and upon the west bounding to Drummenuskilan, meered by a runninge brooke.

The 1652 Commonwealth Survey lists the owner as Sir Francis Hamilton.

In the Hearth Money Rolls compiled on 29 September 1663 there were two Hearth Tax payers in- Dromlhyest- Jeffry Hansly and John Dens.

The 1790 Cavan Carvaghs list spells the townland name as Dromully East.

The 1825 Tithe Applotment Books list nine tithepayers in the townland.

The Drummully East Valuation Office books are available for 1838.

There is an estate map and detailed description of Drummully East in 1849.

Griffith's Valuation of 1857 lists one landholder in the townland.

Cavan Archives Service holds a lease dated 25 July 1857 (Reference No. P017/0070) which states- Counterpart lease made between James Bright, [Carrilidge] Square, County of Middlesex, esquire, of the first part, Catherine Isabella Dickson, Westbourne Grove, County of Middlesex, widow, of the second part, and Matthew Lough, Cavan, County Cavan, gentleman, of the third part. James, with the consent of Dickson, and by virtue of leases dated 19 February 1847 and 5 August 1847 leases to Lough that part of the town and lands of Drummully East, parish of Kildallan, barony of Tullyhunco, county Cavan, containing 215 acres statute measure. Lease to run for term of 31 years at annual rent of £225 sterling. Map of leased premises attached. Shows positions of buildings and fort on the property.

The Public Record Office of Northern Ireland holds a Rent Account book dating from 1893 - 1924 for the tenants of James H. Dickson of Drummully East (Reference No. 'Cav D 3480add').

== Census ==
Year	Population	Males	Females	Total Houses	Uninhabited
1841	46	27	19	9	0
1851	30	16	14	6	0
1861	33	17	16	4	0
1871	20	15	5	3	0
1881	33	17	16	4	0
1891	11	8	3	4	2

In the 1901 census of Ireland, there were ten families listed in the townland.

In the 1911 census of Ireland, there were ten families listed in the townland.

== Antiquities ==
1. An earthen rath. The Archaeological Survey of County Cavan (Site No. 639) states- Raised circular area (internal diameter 57.6 metres) enclosed by a substantial earthen bank. The outer fosse has been levelled. An earlier report (OPW 1968) described it as being wide and deep. Break in bank at SW may represent original entrance.
2. The New Bridge, built 1877 by James Browne. The bridge replaced an earlier bridge of the same name shown on the Ordnance Survey map of 1836.
3. Stepping stones across a stream
4. Drom Mullac House, Lodge and Convent. Built in 1860 by Arthur Lough who formed the Drummully Farm and Garden Society along with his brother Thomas Lough. At a meeting held on the tennis-courts of the house on 3 September 1896 it was decided that this co-operative would widen its scope to include agricultural and dairy interests and thus was born the Drummully Co-operative Agricultural and Dairy Society Ltd. This meeting was attended by 1,500 people. In 1898 Killeshandra would replace Drummully in the title of the co-operative. Killeshandra emerged within a few years as the largest and most successful co-operative society in Ireland. The co-op is now part of Lakeland Dairies. As the Dairy expanded, Drummully House was sold to the Missionary Sisters of the Holy Rosary in 1924 for use as a convent. The convent buildings were extended twice during the first twenty-five years. Part of the convent was opened as a retreat and conference centre in 1976, however the number of vocations continued to decline and eventually the convent was abandoned in 1985.
5. A Wind-Pump.
6. A Bronze Age spearhead which was found in the Cullies River above New Bridge on the river bed. It is now in the National Museum of Ireland (Reference No. 'NMI 1937:89').
