= Drummully West =

Townland in County Cavan, Ireland

Drummully West (Irish and English derived place name, Droim Mullaigh meaning ‘The Hill-Ridge of the Summit’, West meaning the western part of the original Drummully townland before it was sub-divided.) is a townland in the civil parish of Kildallan, barony of Tullyhunco, County Cavan, Ireland.

== Geography ==
Drummully West is bounded on the north by Drumbagh and Drumcartagh townlands, on the west by Druminiskill townland, on the south by Coolnashinny and Mullaghmullan townlands and on the east by Drumbo (Tullyhunco) and Drummully East townlands. Its chief geographical features are small streams, a forestry plantation and spring wells. Drummully West is traversed by the local L5503 road, minor public roads and rural lanes. The townland covers 113 acres.

== History ==
From medieval times up to the early 1600s, the land belonged to the McKiernan Clan. Until the 1650s the present-day townland of Drumbagh formed part of Drummully West.

The 1609 Plantation of Ulster Map depicts the townland as Dromoligh. A government grant of 1610 spells the name as Dromoligh. A 1629 Inquisition spells the name as Dromoligh, Drommaleigh and Drumwillies. The 1652 Commonwealth Survey spells it as Dromully west.

In the Plantation of Ulster King James VI and I by grant dated 23 July 1610 granted the Manor of Clonyn or Taghleagh, which included the two polls of Dromoligh (now comprising the townlands of Drummully East, Drummully West and Drumbagh), to Sir Alexander Hamilton of Innerwick, Scotland. On 29 July 1611 Arthur Chichester, 1st Baron Chichester and others reported that- Sir Alexander Hamilton, Knt, 2,000 acres in the county of Cavan; has not appeared: his son Claud took possession, and brought three servants and six artificers; is in hand with building a mill; trees felled; raised stones and hath competitent arms in readiness. Besides there are arrived upon that portion since our return to Dublin from the journey, as we are informed, twelve tenants and artificers who intend to reside there and build upon the same. An Inquisition held at Cavan on 10 June 1629 stated that the 2 polls called Dromoligh are otherwise called Drumwillies and that they contained eight sub-divisions named Choiscaple, Coulcovead, Leag, Ruddaghedrom, Dromacho, Drombeach, Tonerassin and Carriglas. It also described the boundary of the townland as- Drommaleigh bounding upon the south to Croghin, meered thorow a greate boige, and upon the north to the Feache, meered thorowe a greate boige, and upon the west bounding to Drummenuskilan, meered by a runninge brooke.

The 1652 Commonwealth Survey lists the owner as Sir Francis Hamilton and describes it as wasteland.

In the Hearth Money Rolls compiled on 29 September 1663 there were two Hearth Tax payers in Dromlhyest- Jeffry Hansly and John Dens.

The 1790 Cavan Carvaghs list spells the townland name as Dromully West.

The 1825 Tithe Applotment Books list nine tithepayers in the townland.

The Drummully West Valuation Office books are available for April 1838.

Griffith's Valuation of 1857 lists fifteen landholders in the townland.

== Census ==
Year	Population	Males	Females	Total Houses	Uninhabited
1841	39	18	21	8	0
1851	46	23	23	9	0
1861	40	17	23	8	0
1871	35	19	16	8	0
1881	34	18	16	8	0
1891	37	15	22	8	1

In the 1901 census of Ireland, there were eight families listed in the townland.

In the 1911 census of Ireland, there were eight families listed in the townland.
