= R199 road (Ireland) =

Road in Ireland

R199 road
- Bóthar R199
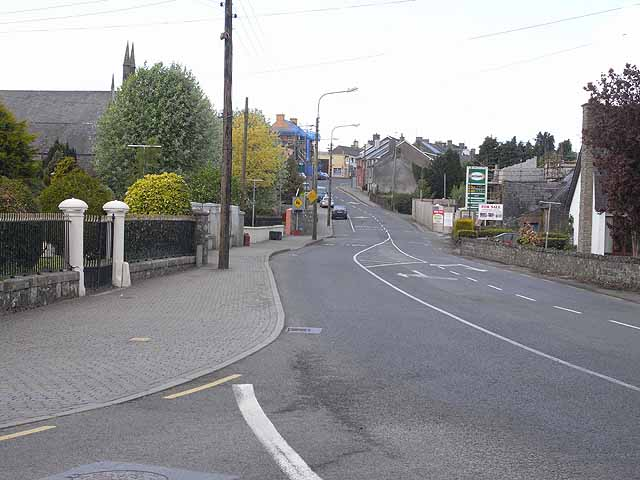
- R199 on Main Street, Killeshandra

Route information
- Length: 28.9 km (18.0 mi)

Major junctions
- From: R198 at Drummora Great, County Cavan
- R201 in Killeshandra; Enter County Leitrim; Cross Shannon–Erne Waterway; R205 at Kilnacreevy
- To: R202 at High Street, Ballinamore

Location
- Country: Ireland

Highway system
- Roads in Ireland; Motorways; Primary; Secondary; Regional

The R199 road is a regional road in Ireland linking the R198 and R202 roads in Counties Cavan and Leitrim. It is a key road for access to the Shannon–Erne Waterway.

From the R198, the road goes north to Killeshandra. Leaving Killeshandra, the road passes Town Lough before turning west. Entering County Leitrim the road passes through Newtowngore. The road then crosses the Ballinamore Canal (a section of the Shannon–Erne Waterway) and passes the eastern shore of Garadice Lough. Passing near to Drumlonan Lough the R199 later ends in Ballinamore, joining the R202. The R199 is 28.9 kilometres (18.0 mi) long.

== See also ==
- Roads in Ireland
