= Earl of Hyndford =

Coat of arms of the Earl of Hyndford, Lord Carmichael and the Carmichael of Carmichael, chief of Clan Carmichael

Earl of Hyndford was a title in the Peerage of Scotland. It was created in 1701 for John Carmichael, 2nd Lord Carmichael, Secretary of State from 1696 to 1707. He was made Lord Carmichael and Viscount of Inglisberry and Nemphlar at the same time, also in the Peerage of Scotland. He was the grandson of James Carmichael, who had been created a Baronet, of Westraw in the County of Lanark, in the Baronetage of Nova Scotia in 1627, and raised to the Peerage of Scotland as Lord Carmichael in 1647. The third Earl was a prominent diplomat. The titles became dormant on the death of the sixth Earl in 1817, and were later unsuccessfully claimed by James Carmichael Smyth and his great-grandson James Morse Carmichael.

== Lords Carmichael (1647) ==
- James Carmichael, 1st Lord Carmichael (1579–1672)
- John Carmichael, 2nd Lord Carmichael (1638–1710) (created Earl of Hyndford in 1701)

== Earls of Hyndford (1701) ==
- John Carmichael, 1st Earl of Hyndford (1638–1710)
- Brig.-General James Carmichael, 2nd Earl of Hyndford (died 1737)
- John Carmichael, 3rd Earl of Hyndford (1701–1766) (succeeded by his uncle's son)
- John Carmichael, 4th Earl of Hyndford (1710–1787) (succeeded by his uncle's grandson)
- Thomas Carmichael, 5th Earl of Hyndford (c. 1750–1811) (unmarried, succeeded by brother)
- Andrew Carmichael, 6th Earl of Hyndford (1758–1817) (unmarried)
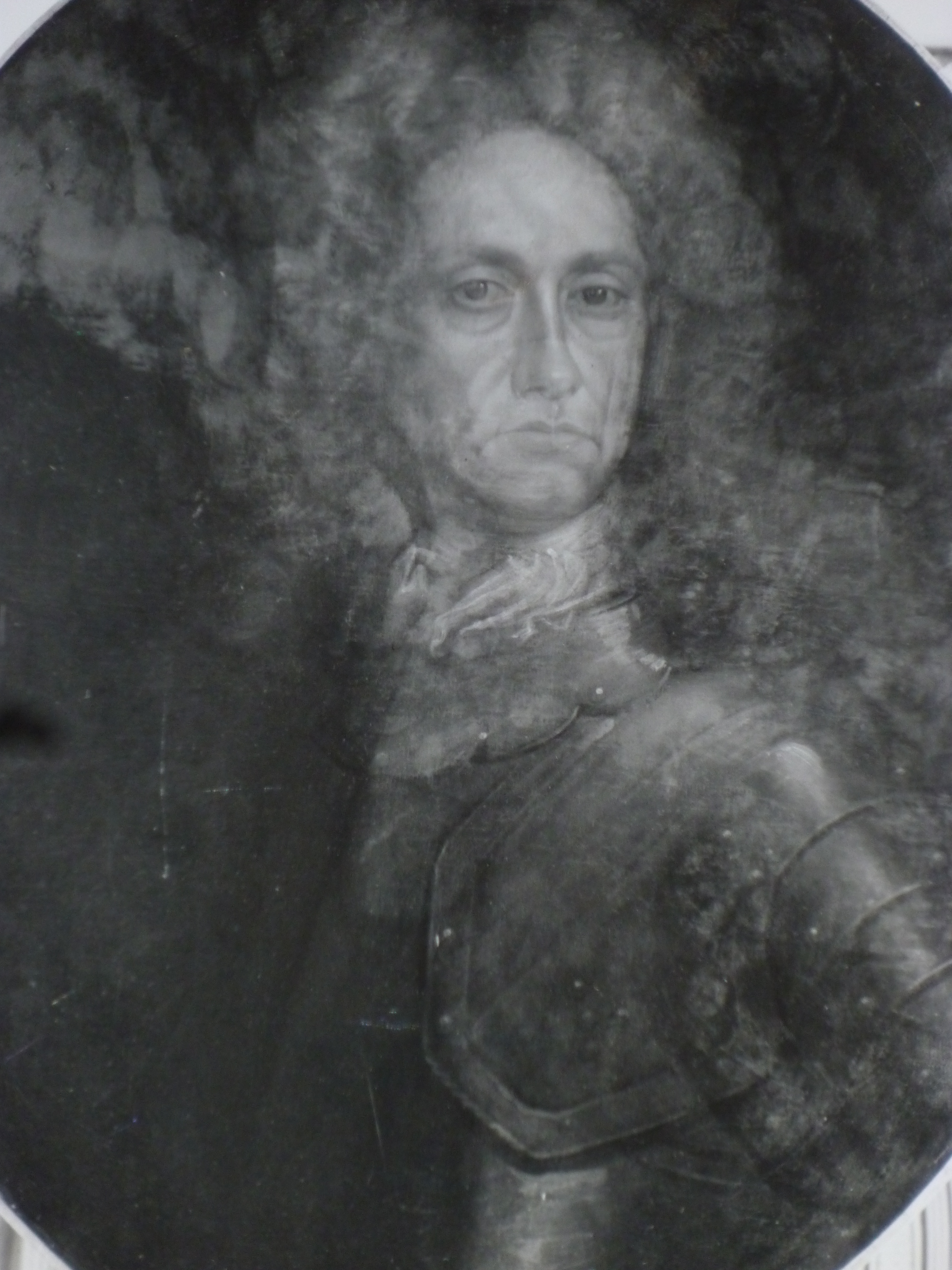
2nd Earl of Hyndford (by Medina)

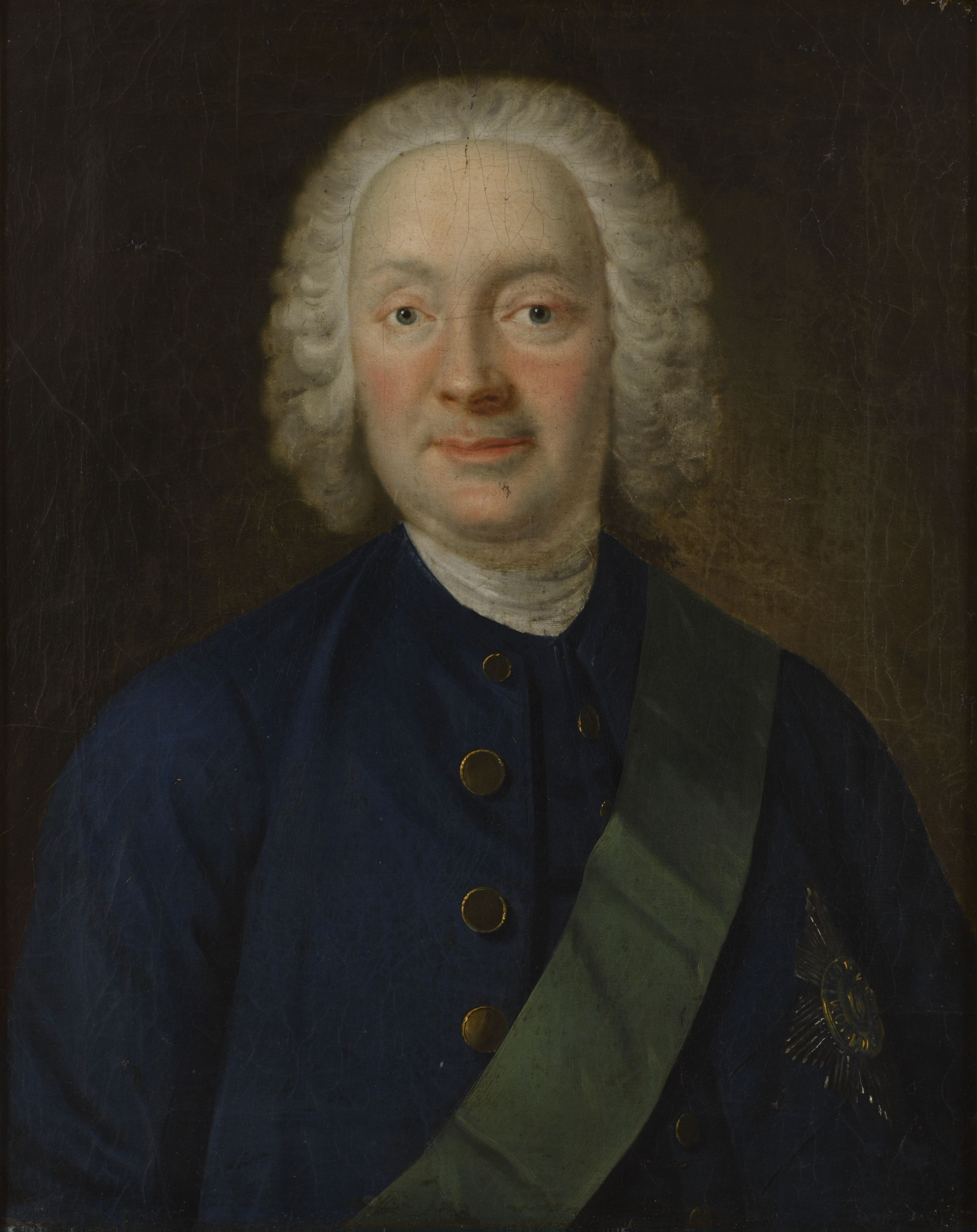
3rd Earl of Hyndford (by Cosmo Alexander)

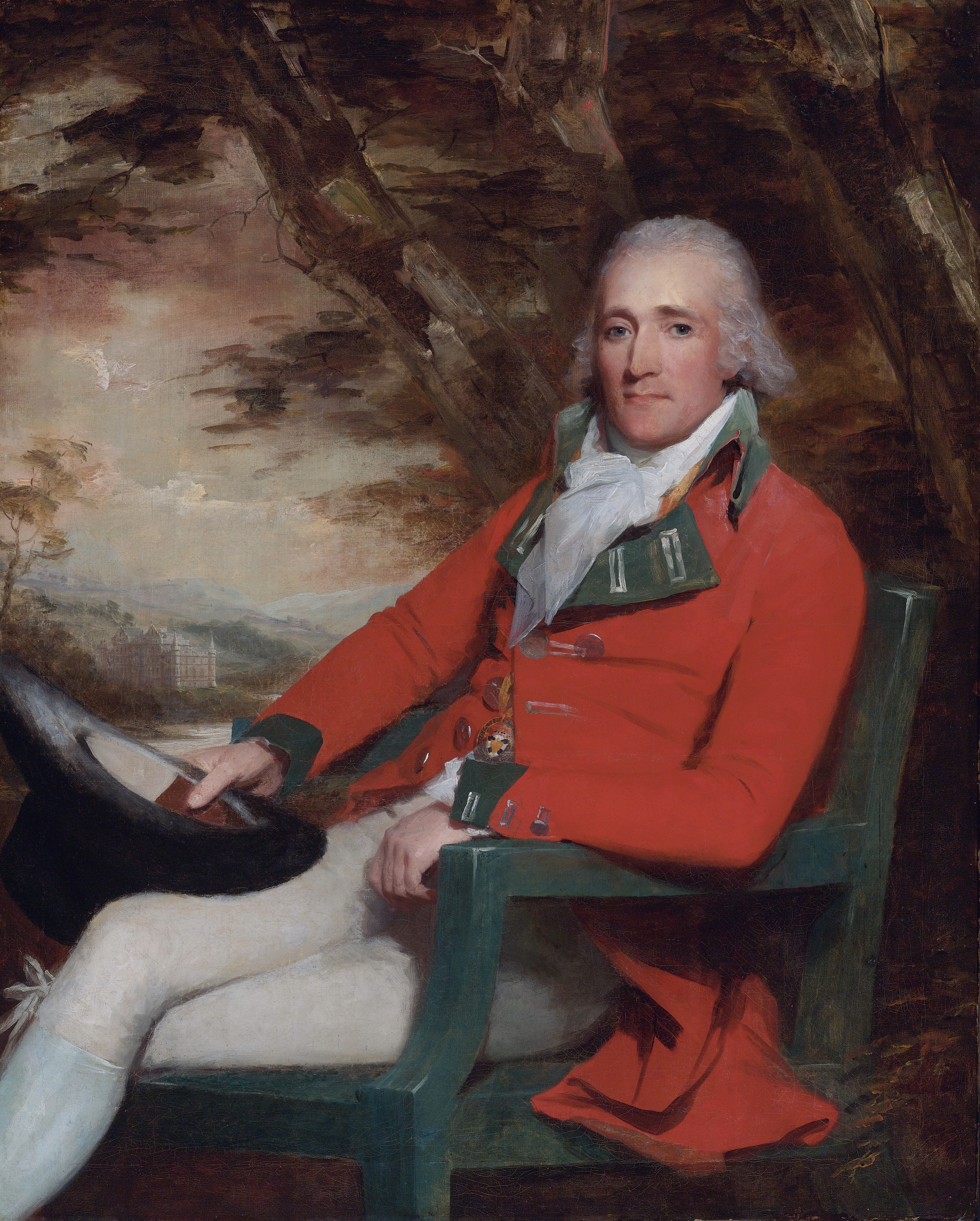
5th Earl of Hyndford (by Henry Raeburn)
