= Killarah =

Townland in County Cavan, Ireland

Killarah (Irish derived place name either Coill an Rátha meaning 'The Wood of the Fort' or Coill Leath Ráth = 'The Wood of the Half-Fort' or Coill Áth Ráth meaning 'The Wood of the Ford of the Rath') is a townland in the civil parish of Kildallan, barony of Tullyhunco, County Cavan, Ireland.

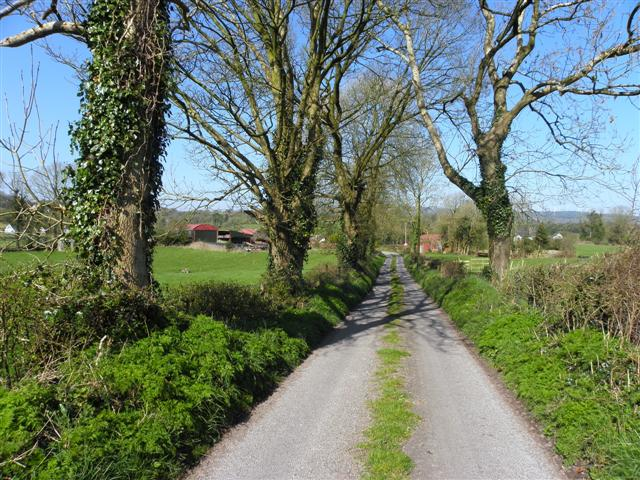
Road at Killarah (geograph 2870446)

== Geography ==
Killarah is bounded on the west by Bellaheady, Coologe and Toberlyan Duffin townlands, on the east by Agharaskilly, Clontygrigny and Fartrin townlands, on the south by Callaghs townland and on the north by Crossmakelagher and Cormeen townlands. Its chief geographical features are Bellaheady Mountain which rises to 328 feet, Lough Andoul (Loch an Diabhail = The Devil’s Lake), the Shannon-Erne Waterway, small streams, forestry plantations, sand pits, gravel pits and dug wells. Killarah is traversed by minor public roads and rural lanes. The townland covers 688 acres. It is around 4 km south-west of Ballyconnell.

== History ==
Until the 1650s Killarah was paired with the townland of Bellaheady. Locals and the Ordnance Survey still refer to part of Killarah as Bellaheady Mountain. The land was split by the river but the names of the two parts were interchangeable, being called either Bellheady, Rossbressal or Killarah.

The townland was occupied in prehistoric times as is evident from the number of cairns therein.

From medieval times up to the early 1600s, the land belonged to the McKiernan Clan. About 1600 it was owned by Thomas McKiernan, along with the townlands of Ned, Coraghmuck and Doogary, all in Tullyhunco Barony. He sold the land c.1606 to Richard Tyrrell of Tyrrellspass, County Westmeath. A schedule, dated 31 July 1610, of the lands Tyrrell owned in Tullyhunco prior to the Ulster Plantation included: Rosbressaill, one cartron (a cartron was about 30 acres of arable land). In the Plantation of Ulster, Tyrrell swapped his lands in Killarah for additional land in the barony of Tullygarvey where he lived at the time.

The Plantation of Ulster 1609 Baronial Map depicts Rosbrazill on the west side of the river but does not depict the townland of Killarah on the east side, because the lands in Tullyhunco were supposed to be set aside for English servitors but Killarah was granted to an Irish native in contravention of the rules, so the mappers avoided the problem by not mapping Killarah. Thomas McKiernan died sometime before 1611 and his son Owen McKiernan inherited his lands. Owen was worried that his lands would be confiscated under the Plantation of Ulster so he made representations to the Lords of the Council in Whitehall, London. They in turn sent the following note to Arthur Chichester, 1st Baron Chichester, the Lord Deputy of Ireland- April 30, 1610. Recommend to his favourable consideration in the settlement of the natives, the bearer, Owen Carnan, who sued for 800 acres of land lying in the county of Cavan, which have belonged (as he informs them) to his father, uncle, & others his predecessors, time out of mind, without any attainder for matter of disloyalty. Owen McKiernan was only partly successful in his claim as the part of Rosbrazill on the west side of the river (now the townland of Bellheady) was granted to Hugh Culme on 23 June 1610. However Owen succeeded in the rest of his claim. In the Plantation of Ulster by grant dated 4 June 1611, King James VI and I granted four polls of land containing 200 acres, including Killarah, Ned, Tullyhunco, Coraghmuck (alias Greaghacholea) and Doogary to Wony McThomas McKernan (alias Owen Carnan). In an inquisition of King Charles I held at Cavan on 20 April 1629, it stated that Owny McThomas McKiernan, late of Rossbressell in Co. Cavan, was seised of 2 polls of land in Rossbressell and he died on 20 October 1626. John alias Shane McKiernan, his son and heir, was then aged 30 years and married. At Cavan on 26 July 1642 Thomas and William Jones gave the names of rebel leaders in Cavan in the Irish Rebellion of 1641, including Owen Mc William of Rosbreske, Donogh Mc Kernan of same and William Mc Kernan of same. After the rebellion concluded, the land was confiscated in the Cromwellian Settlement and the 1652 Commonwealth Survey lists the townland as belonging to Lieutenant-Colonel Tristam Beresford and by a further confirming grant from King Charles II on 6 November 1666, the lands of Rospressell containing 2 poles or 431 acres & 31 perches was granted to the aforementioned Sir Tristram Beresford, 1st Baronet at an annual rent of £5-16s-5d. On 11 September 1670 Respressol was created as part of the Manor of Beresford. The Hearth Money Rolls of 1664 list five taxpayers in the townland- John Hakins, Philip Reilly, Philip O'Mane, Shane McLaghlyn & Tirlagh O'Cuillin.

The 1652 Commonwealth Survey lists the townland as Killarah.

The 1665 Down Survey map depicts it as Rossepressell.

William Petty's map of 1685 depicts it as Rosspressell.

In 1739 Dean John Richardson (the rector of Annagh Parish, County Cavan 1709-1747) stated- At Kilara in the Parish of Kildallan there are three large cairns, 30 yards diameter, vitz: Carn na mban fion, i.e., the monument of the fair woman, and Leabui Doarmud and Leabui Graniu, that is Dermot’s bed and Granny’s bed. The two last had small apartments and urns in them. In the first there was found about 40 years ago (1700) a golden chalice of considerable value by a farmer, who thinking it to be brass made a present of it to Capt. Ellis his landlord.

In the Cavan Poll Book of 1761 there was one person registered to vote in Ballyheady in the Irish general election, 1761 - Gore Ellis who lived in the townland but who also had a freehold in Burren (townland) . He was entitled to cast two votes. The four election candidates were Charles Coote, 1st Earl of Bellomont and Lord Newtownbutler (later Brinsley Butler, 2nd Earl of Lanesborough), both of whom were then elected Member of Parliament for Cavan County. The losing candidates were George Montgomery (MP) of Ballyconnell and Barry Maxwell, 1st Earl of Farnham. Ellis voted for Coote and Montgomery. Absence from the poll book either meant a resident did not vote or more likely was not a freeholder entitled to vote, which would mean most of the inhabitants of Bellaheady.

The 1790 Cavan Carvaghs list spells the name as Killara.

The Tithe Applotment Books for 1827 lists twelve tithepayers in the townland

The Killarah Valuation Office Field books are available for May 1838.

In 1841 the population of the townland was 95, being 44 males and 51 females. There were twelve houses in the townland, all were inhabited.

In 1851 the population of the townland was 90, being 48 males and 42 females. There were thirteen houses in the townland and all were inhabited.

Griffith's Valuation of 1857 lists twenty-four occupiers in the townland.

In 1861 the population of the townland was 66, being 42 males and 24 females. There were eleven houses in the townland and all were inhabited.

In 1871 the population of the townland was 74, being 43 males and 31 females. There were twelve houses in the townland, of which one was uninhabited.(page 298 of census)

In 1881 the population of the townland was 66, being 36 males and 30 females. There were eleven houses in the townland, of which one was uninhabited.

In 1891 the population of the townland was 66, being 31 males and 35 females. There were eleven houses in the townland, all were inhabited.

In the 1901 census of Ireland, there are eleven families listed in the townland.

In the 1911 census of Ireland, there are thirteen families listed in the townland.

== Antiquities ==
1. A prehistoric stone cairn called Leaba Dhiarmada (The Bed of Dermot). The 'Archaeological Inventory of County Cavan' (Site No. 149) describes it as- First noted by Richardson in the early 18th century (Paterson, Gaffikin and Davies 1938, 147). Marked 'Fort' on OS 1836 and 1876 eds. Situated on the summit of a low hill. A much-denuded circular cairn of small stones (diam. 20.7m ENE-WSW; H 0.4m). The site is divided into two unequal portions by a field boundary aligned ENE-WSW. Only the outline of the perimeter is identifiable on the SSE side of the boundary.
2. A prehistoric stone cairn called Leaba Ghráinne (The Bed of Gráinne). The 'Archaeological Inventory of County Cavan' (Site No. 150) describes it as- First noted by Richardson in the early 18th century (Paterson, Gaffikin and Davies 1938, 147). Marked on all OS eds. Situated on the summit of a low hill. It would appear from its depiction on the OS to have been originally oval in plan (dims. c. 37m NE-SW; c. 22m NW-SE). The site is thickly overgrown with vegetation. Nonetheless a much-denuded apparently circular cairn of small stones (diam. 14m; H 0.8m) is identifiable. A modern field boundary aligned NNE-SSW divides the site into two roughly equal portions. A second bank of earth and stone runs from WNW-SSW and its outline can also be traced from ENE-SE.
3. A prehistoric stone cairn called Cairn na mBan Fionn (The Cairn of the White Women). The 'Archaeological Inventory of County Cavan' (Site No. 151) describes it as- First noted by Richardson in the early 18th century (Paterson, Gaffikin and Davies 1938, 147). Marked on all OS eds. Situated on a natural terrace, a short distance NE of the summit of Ballyheady Mountain, surrounded by a plantation of coniferous trees. A much-denuded, large, circular, now almost flat-topped cairn of large and small stones (dims. 28m NW-SE; 27.2m NE-SW; H 3.2m). A large slab is visible within a hole which has been dug into the lower edge of the cairn at ENE. It apparently formed part of the cist burial (CV014-043002-) investigated by Ó Ríordáin in 1932 (Ó Ríordáin 1933, 167-71). This monument is subject to a preservation order made under the National Monuments Acts 1930 to 2014 (PO no. 7/1932). Local tradition states that the Ulaid hero Conall Cernach is buried there.
4. Cist. The 'Archaeological Inventory of County Cavan' (Site No. 163) describes it as- Discovered at the E end of Killarah cairn (CV014-043002-). Investigated by Ó Ríordáin (1933, 167-71) in 1932. The grave comprised a limestone slab c. 2.14m x 1.21m 'which rested in a sloping position on a stone placed beneath it. The front or eastern end of the grave was closed by a low, roughly built, dry-stone wall which formed the arc of a circle of which the eastern end of the slab was the chord. The space between the wall and the slab was closed by flat stones, some of which had collapsed into the grave'. Within the cist he found both inhumed and cremated human remains but no grave-goods. He believed that the cist represented a secondary burial 'built at some time after the cairn and somewhat outside its periphery' and suggested a tentative Middle Bronze Age date for it. A large slab is visible within a hole which has been dug into the lower edge of the cairn at ENE, which is possibly the covering stone of the cist noted above. This monument is subject to a preservation order made under the National Monuments Acts 1930 to 2014 (PO no. 7/1932).
5. Enclosure. The 'Archaeological Inventory of County Cavan' (Site No. 1386) describes it as- Depicted as a circular enclosure on OS 1836 and 1876 eds. Situated within a dense plantation of coniferous trees, close to the summit of Ballyheady Mountain.
