= Killycluggin =

Townland in County Cavan, Ireland

Coordinates: 54.07514°N 7.810271°W

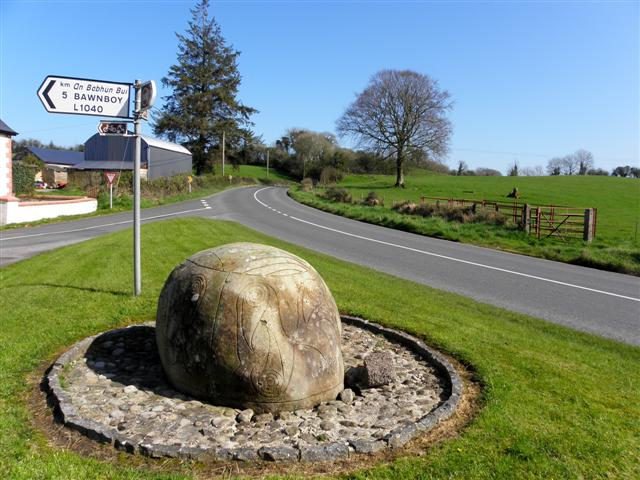
Killycluggin Stone

Killycluggin (from Irish 'Coil a Chlogáin', meaning "the Wood of the Bell-Shaped Stone") is a townland in the civil parish of Templeport, in the baroney of Tullyhaw, County Cavan, Republic of Ireland. The nearest town to Killycluggin at about 5km distance is Ballyconnell on the R205 road.

== Geography ==
Killycluggin is bounded on the north by Tonyhallagh townland, on the west by Lissanover townland, on the east by Tonyrevan townland and on the south by Bellaheady townland in Kildallan parish and by Kilnavert and Corran, County Cavan townlands. Killycluggin's chief geographical features are a stream, a stone quarry and a gravel pit. Killycluggin is traversed by the R205 road just 5km from Ballyconnell town. Nearby is the remains of the old railway track Cavan and Leitrim Railway. The townland covers 76 statute acres.

== History ==
From medieval times the McGuaran tuath of the baroney of Tullyhaw was divided into economic taxation areas called ballibetoes, from the Irish Baile Biataigh (Anglicized as 'Ballybetagh'), meaning 'A Provisioner's Town or Settlement'. The original purpose was to enable the farmer, who controlled the baile, to provide hospitality for those who needed it, such as poor people and travellers. The ballybetagh was further divided into townlands farmed by individual families who paid a tribute or tax to the head of the ballybetagh, who in turn paid a similar tribute to the clan chief. The steward of the ballybetagh would have been the secular equivalent of the erenagh in charge of church lands. There were seven ballibetoes in the parish of Templeport. Killycluggin was located in the ballybetagh of Bally Cooleigie (alias 'Bally Cowleg'). In Irish this was Baile Cúl Ó nGuaire meaning "The Town of Guaire's Corner", or possibly Baile Cúl Ó Gabhair, meaning "The Town of the Goats' Corner".

Until the 1652 Cromwellian Settlement of Ireland, the modern townland of Tonyrevan formed part of the townland of Killycluggin. The 1609 Ulster Plantation Baronial Map depicts the townland as Killcloggin. A 1610 grant spells it as Kilclogen. A 1630 Inquisition spells it as Kilcloghan. The 1652 Commonwealth Survey spells the name as Killerluggin. The 1665 Down Survey map depicts it as Killycraggan.

Killycluggin was the site of the pre-Christian pagan god of Ireland Crom Cruach, the Killycluggin Stone, situated in a stone circle on Bannon's farm in the townland.

In the Plantation of Ulster by grant dated 23 June 1610, along with other lands, King James VI and I granted two polls of Kilclogen to Hugh Culme, esquire, as part of the Manor of Calva. Culme then surrendered his interest in Killycluggin to Walter Talbot of Ballyconnell. Walter Talbot died on 26 June 1625 at Ballyconnell and his son James Talbot succeeded to the Killycluggin lands aged just 10 years. An Inquisition held in Cavan Town on 20 September 1630 stated that Walter Talbot's lands included two polls in Kilcloghan. James Talbot married Helen Calvert, the daughter of George Calvert, 1st Baron Baltimore of Maryland, USA, in 1635 and had a son Colonel George Talbot who owned an estate in Cecil County, Maryland which he named Ballyconnell in honour of his native town in Cavan. George Talbot was appointed Surveyor-General of Maryland in 1683. In the aftermath of the Irish Rebellion of 1641, James Talbot's estate in Ballyconnell was confiscated in the Cromwellian Act for the Settlement of Ireland 1652 because he was a Catholic and he was granted an estate in 1655 at Castle Rubey, County Roscommon instead. He died in 1687. The Talbot lands in Killycluggin were distributed as follows-

The 1652 Commonwealth Survey lists the townland as belonging to Captain Gwilliams (i.e. the landlord of Ballyconnell, Captain Thomas Gwyllym) and the tenants as Edward Rely & Others.

In the Hearth Money Rolls compiled on 29 September 1663 there were three Hearth Tax payers in- Kilclagan- Dorby Don, John Reade and Thomas Teddy.

Gwyllym later sold the land to John Blachford who was born in 1598 in Ashmore, Dorset, England, the son of Richard and Frances Blachford. He became a merchant in Dorchester, Dorset but fled to France in 1633 when facing a warrant from the Exchequer for not paying customs. He married Mary Renald from Devon and died at Lissanover, County Cavan in 1661 and was buried at St. Orvins in Dublin (probably St. Audoen's Church, Dublin (Church of Ireland)), despite wishing to be buried back in Dorchester. His will was published on 9 January 1665 leaving his son John Blachford as his sole heir. An Inquisition held in Cavan on 21 May 1667 found that his widow Mary Blachford and his heir John were seized of, inter alia, the land of Killeclogine alias Killecragan. He had sons John, Thomas, Ambrose and William (who became a Major) and daughters Mary and Frances. Major William Blachford was born in 1658 and died at Lissanover on 28 March 1727. The Blachford family gravestones in Templeport Church read as follows- This monument was erected by MAJOR WILLIAM / BLASHFORD of Lisnover in 1721 to the memory of / his father, JOHN BLASHFORD, late of the same Esqr. but / from Dorchester in Dorsetshire, the place of his / nativity, who in his lifetime chose this for a burying / place, for himself and family, but died in Dublin / was buried in St. Orvins Church but his wife, MARY / RENALD of a Devonsheire family is buried here / as also three sons and two daughters, viz JOHN / AMBROSE AND THOMAS; MARY AND FRANCES / Here likewise lies buried two wives of MAJOR WILLIAM BLASHFORD, son to the said JOHN BLASHFORD viz / MARY MAGHEE of an ancient Family in Lincolnsheire. CORNET CHIDLEY BLACHFORD, son to MAJOR WILLIAM BLACHFORD, leys buried here who dyed August ye 29th, 1722. This aboue MAJOR WILLIAM BLACHFORD. / That erected this monument, died the 28th of March 1727, aged 69 years.

A deed dated 10 May 1744 spells the name as Killiclogan.

The 1790 Cavan Carvaghs list spells the name as Kilclogan.

The Tithe Applotment Books for 1827 list four tithe payers in the townland.

The Killycluggin Valuation Office Field books are available for 1839–1841.

Griffith's Valuation of 1857 lists sixteen tenant landholders in the townland under landlord William Blashford

== Killycluggin School ==
In 1833 a lease of one acre in Killycluggin was given by the landlord William Blackford to the Anglican Rector of Templeport, Rev. William Bushe, for the purpose of setting up a school for Church of Ireland children. It was still in operation in August 1860 as the then rector, Rev. John Brougham, wrote a letter to his archbishop stating- Two schools in his Parish, one partly and the other wholly, supported by the Archbishop. These are in poor repair and have no supplies of maps, books, etc. The teachers are both good but are getting discouraged at the lack of materials and the poor state of the schools. Asks for financial assistance. Killycluggin school came under the auspices of the Irish Church Education Society.

== Census ==
Year	Population	Males	Females	Total Houses	Uninhabited
1841	62	31	31	13	0
1851	56	29	27	12	1
1861	53	29	24	11	0
1871	36	22	14	9	1
1881	53	28	25	9	0
1891	51	27	24	8	1

In the 1901 census of Ireland, there were ten families listed in the townland, and in the 1911 census of Ireland, there were just nine families listed in the townland.

== Antiquities ==
1. A Neolithic Stone Circle (Site number 62 in Archaeological Inventory of County Cavan, Patrick O'Donovan, 1995, where it is described as- Situated 10m WNW of the site of the celebrated Killycluggin Stone (93). Much disturbed. Subcircular raised area (int. dims. 22m E-W; 18.6m N-S) enclosed by a total of eighteen stones, all but five of which have fallen. The site is divided into two unequal portions by a field boundary running N-S. The smaller portion, W of this, is defined by four orthostats still in position. The largest stone (now fallen) is at NNE (L 3.93m; dims. 1.45m x 0.68m). (Ó Ríordáin 1979, 155; Killanin and Duignan 1989, 61).)
2. A La Tène decorated standing stone called the Killycluggin Stone or the Crom Cruach Stone which was originally situated in the above stone circle but is now in Cavan County Museum (Site number 93 in Archaeological Inventory of County Cavan, Patrick O’Donovan, 1995, where it is described as- The Killycluggin stone is a fragmentary decorated monolith of Iron Age date that was first brought to general public notice in 1922 (Macalister 1922). At that time the stone was in the same broken state in which it now appears and was situated some 10m SE of a stone circle (CV013-026002-). Macalister recorded local traditions which alleged that the damage to the stone had been carried out in living memory by local farmers in order to remove an obstruction to agricultural activities. Macalister also stated that people of the vicinity had dug around the stone in a vain search for buried treasure and in so doing had apparently destroyed a 'cist burial'. He did not, however, actually see this 'cist burial'. Some thirty years later a second decorated stone fragment, probably a portion of the same monolith, was discovered a short distance down-slope from the main piece. In the early summer of 1974 it was decided to remove the weathered and overgrown fragments to the National Museum of Ireland. A limited excavation was undertaken in its immediate vicinity which revealed that 'the stone stood in a flat-bottomed pit which had been deliberately sunk 80cm into the subsoil to receive it' (Raftery 1978, 51-2). Immediately E of the stone were two pits one of which may be identified as the remains of the cist burial identified by Macalister as it contained tiny fragments of burnt bone (CV013-026003-). The two fragments of the Killycluggin Stone are on display in the Cavan County Museum, Ballyjamesduff, while a replica stands at the cross-roads c. 250m NW of the original site. The following description of the stone is derived from Raftery (1978, 49-51). The main fragment has been worked to more-or-less cylindrical form on its surviving upper portion. That part which was intended to be below ground level is rough and irregular and projects awkwardly in one direction so that the stone as a whole is crudely L-shaped. The base of the stone slopes obliquely to its vertical axis. The entire upper surface of this stone had been smashed by deliberate and systematic hammering. This destruction continued along one side, whereby the ornament, down to the base of the stone was totally obliterated. The surviving ornament, which comprises combinations of sweeping curves and tight, hair-spring spirals – classic La Tène motifs – is chiseled deeply and crisply into the prepared surface of the stone. The curvilinear patterns have been divided into rectangular panels by straight vertical lines and by horizontal lines at right angles to them which define the basal extremity of the ornamented area. The precise original width of only one such panel can now be ascertained (c. 0.9m wide and 0.75m high) but it may be estimated that four such panels of decoration once existed on the stone giving an original circumference of 3.6m. The smaller decorated fragment appears to represent a portion of the dome-shaped top of the original monolith and, in this regard, would have resembled that of the best known of the Irish aniconic stones, the stele from Turoe, Co. Galway (GA097-152----). The decoration on this fragment is of two types. Along one edge slight remains of curvilinear patterns, similar to those on the portion just described, survive. Sufficient remains to show that the upper limits of this decoration are defined by a straight line as is the case at the base of the stone, and traces of one of the lines which divide the ornament into vertical, rectangular panels are present here too. The convex upper surface of this fragment is decorated by a series of deeply chiseled, parallel lines which extend across the surface of the stone. The surviving edges of this panel of ornament are defined by a straight line which is incised at an oblique angle to the line which forms the boundary to the zones of curvilinear ornament. Thus there occurs what is now a triangular area, devoid of ornament between the ornament on the apex of the stone and the ornament on the surviving cylindrical part. The two decorated fragments do not join so that neither the original height of the stone nor the precise overall disposition of its ornamentation can now be ascertained. (O'Donovan 1995, no. 93 with further references) The Killycluggin Ornamented stones are subject to a preservation order made under the National Monuments Acts 1930 to 2014 (PO no. 17/1933). References: 1. Macalister, R.A.S. 1922 On a stone with La Tène decoration recently discovered in Co. Cavan. Journal of the Royal Society of Antiquaries of Ireland 52, 113-16. 2. O'Donovan, P.F. 1995 Archaeological inventory of county Cavan. Dublin. Stationery Office. 3. Raftery, B. 1978 Excavations at Killycluggin, county Cavan. Ulster Journal of Archaeology 41, 49-54..)
3. A Bronze Age stone cist discovered when excavating the Killycluggin Stone (Site number 165 in Archaeological Inventory of County Cavan, Patrick O'Donovan, 1995)
4. A Megalithic Tomb (Site number 46 in Archaeological Inventory of County Cavan, Patrick O'Donovan, 1995, where it is described as- There are three set stones here. A large stone, 1.8m by 0.25m by 1m high, is aligned E-W. To the S and at right angles to its W end is a second stone, 1.25m by 0.25m by 0.4m in exposed height. The third stone, 0.7m W of the S end of the last, is aligned E-W and measures 0.6m by 0.4m by 0.6m high. This configuration of stones may represent the remains of some form of megalithic monument. Field-clearance debris has been heaped around it. (Davies, ITA Survey, Co. Cavan 1941).)
5. An earthen ring-fort (Site number 775 in Archaeological Inventory of County Cavan, Patrick O'Donovan, 1995, where it is described as- Raised oval area (int. dims. c. 56m NNE-SSW; c. 40m WNW-ESE) enclosed by two substantial earthen banks with wide, deep, partly waterlogged intermediate fosse. From E-S-SW the external bank has been modified and incorporated into the field boundary. From NNW-N-NE the inner bank has been removed and replaced by a modern field boundary. An earlier report (OPW 1969) suggested that the original entrance may have been at WSW. Densely overgrown with vegetation.)
6. An earthen ring-fort (Site number 774 in Archaeological Inventory of County Cavan, Patrick O'Donovan, 1995, where it is described as- Not marked on any OS ed. Raised oval area (int. dims. 35m E-W; 29.2m N-S) divided into two roughly equal portions by the now disused Cavan-Leitrim railway. The portion WNW of this is enclosed by a low much-disturbed bank of earth and stone. Projecting into the internal area from the inner face of the bank at WNW are possible remains of a souterrain (CV013-027002-). The portion ESE of the railway has been largely levelled but its outline is readily identifiable. Original entrance not recognisable.)
7. An underground Souterrain discovered in ring-fort No. 774 above (Site number 1244 in Archaeological Inventory of County Cavan, Patrick O'Donovan, 1995, where it is described as- Situated within Killycluggin rath (CV013-027001-). A long, deep depression (L7.7m; Wth 1.8m; D 1m) projecting into the interior from the inner face of the bank of the rath at WNW, may represent a collapsed souterrain.)
8. A Lime kiln
