= Tonyrevan =

Townland in the civil parish of Templeport, County Cavan, Ireland

Coordinates: 54.07514°N 7.810271°W

Tonyrevan (from Irish either Tonnaigh Riabhain, meaning 'The Pasture of the Grey Hill' or 'Tonnaigh Craobhach, meaning 'The Bushy Pasture', or Tonnaigh Riabháin', meaning 'Revan's Pasture') is a townland in the civil parish of Templeport, County Cavan, Ireland. It lies in the Roman Catholic parish of Templeport and barony of Tullyhaw.

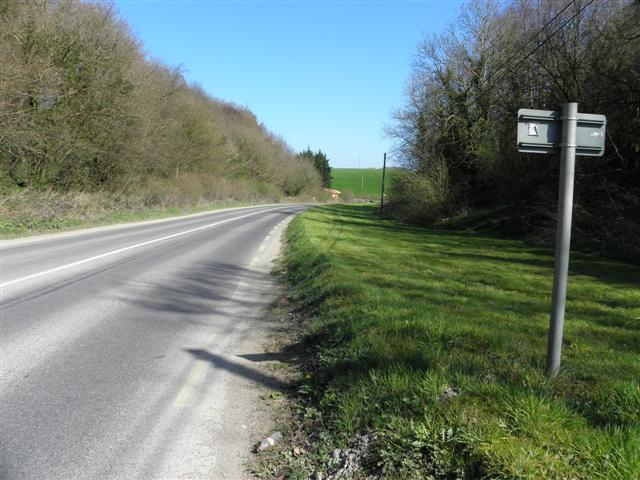
R205, Tonyrevan (geograph 2870452)

== Geography ==
Tonyrevan is bounded on the west by Tonyhallagh and Killycluggin townlands, on the east by Crossmakelagher townland and on the south by Bellaheady townland in Kildallan parish. Tonyrevan's chief geographical features are a wood, a spring well, a dug well and a stone quarry. Tonyrevan is traversed by the national secondary R205 road (Ireland), rural lanes and the disused Cavan and Leitrim Railway. The townland covers 55 statute acres.

== History ==
In medieval times the McGovern tuath of Tullyhaw was divided into economic taxation areas called ballibetoes, from the Irish Baile Biataigh (Anglicized as 'Ballybetagh'), meaning 'A Provisioner's Town or Settlement'. The original purpose was to enable the farmer, who controlled the baile, to provide hospitality for those who needed it, such as poor people and travellers. The ballybetagh was further divided into townlands farmed by individual families who paid a tribute or tax to the head of the ballybetagh, who in turn paid a similar tribute to the clan chief. The steward of the ballybetagh would have been the secular equivalent of the erenagh in charge of church lands. There were seven ballibetoes in the parish of Templeport. Tonyrevan was located in the ballybetagh of Bally Cooleigie (alias 'Bally Cowleg'). In Irish this was Baile Cúl Ó nGuaire meaning "The Town of Guaire's Corner", or possibly Baile Cúl Ó Gabhair, meaning "The Town of the Goats' Corner".

Until the 1652 Cromwellian Settlement of Ireland, Tonyrevan formed part of the townland of Killycluggin and its history is the same up until then. The 1609 Baronial Map depicts the townland as part of Killcloggin.

The 1652 Commonwealth Survey spells the name as Tonyreavan. The 1665 Down Survey map depicts it as Tonyrevan. Another name for the townland was Rostonybegg or Rostonibeg (from Irish Ros Tonnaigh Beag, meaning 'The Wood of the Small Pasture')

The 1652 Commonwealth Survey lists the proprietor as being Lieutenant John Blackforde and the tenant as Dorby Donn, who also appear as proprietor and tenant for several other Templeport townlands in the same survey. John Blachford was born in 1598 in Ashmore, Dorset, England, the son of Richard and Frances Blachford. He became a merchant in Dorchester, Dorset but fled to France in 1633 when facing a warrant from the Exchequer for not paying customs. He married Mary Renald from Devon and died at Lissanover, County Cavan in 1661 and was buried at St. Orvins in Dublin (probably St. Audoen's Church, Dublin) despite wishing to be buried back in Dorchester. His will was published on 9 January 1665 leaving his son John Blachford as his sole heir. An Inquisition held in Cavan on 21 May 1667 found that his widow Mary Blachford and his heir John were seized of, inter alia, the land of Toneycrevagh alias Townegrevan alias Toneyrevan. He had four sons, John, Thomas, Ambrose and William (who became a Major), and two daughters, Mary and Frances. Major William Blachford was born in 1658 and died at Lissanover on 28 March 1727. The Blachford family gravestones in Templeport Church read as follows: This monument was erected by MAJOR WILLIAM / BLASHFORD of Lisnover in 1721 to the memory of / his father, JOHN BLASHFORD, late of the same Esqr. but / from Dorchester in Dorsetshire, the place of his / nativity, who in his lifetime chose this for a burying / place, for himself and family, but died in Dublin / was buried in St. Orvins Church but his wife, MARY / RENALD of a Devonsheire family is buried here / as also three sons and two daughters, viz JOHN / AMBROSE AND THOMAS; MARY AND FRANCES / Here likewise lies buried two wives of MAJOR WILLIAM BLASHFORD, son to the said JOHN BLASHFORD viz / MARY MAGHEE of an ancient Family in Lincolnsheire. CORNET CHIDLEY BLACHFORD, son to MAJOR WILLIAM BLACHFORD, leys buried here who dyed August ye 29th, 1722. This aboue MAJOR WILLIAM BLACHFORD. / That erected this monument, died the 28th of March 1727, aged 69 years.

A deed dated 10 May 1744 spells the name as Tennyravan. The 1790 Cavan Carvaghs list spells the name as Tonnyrevan.

The Tithe Applotment Books for 1827 list eight tithepayers in the townland.

The Tonyrevan Valuation Office Field books are available for 1839-1840.

On 4 November 1844, a party of armed men attacked the house of Thomas Hayes of Tonyraven, from which they carried off a sword and swore him to silence.

Griffith's Valuation (1857) lists four landholders in the townland.

== Census ==
Year	Population	Males	Females	Total Houses	Uninhabited
1841	21	10	11	4	0
1851	18	9	9	3	0
1861	12	4	8	2	0
1871	12	5	7	2	0
1881	10	4	6	2	0
1891	9	3	6	2	0

In the 1901 census of Ireland, there are two families listed in the townland, and in the 1911 census of Ireland, there are two families listed in the townland.
