= Crossmakelagher =

Townland in the civil parish of Templeport, County Cavan, Ireland

Coordinates: 54.098°N 7.626°W

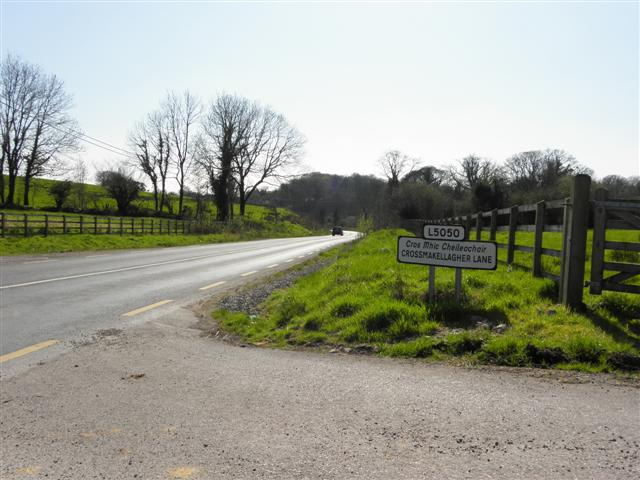
R205 road in Crossmakellagher townland

Crossmakelagher, also written Crossmakellagher or Crossmakellegher (from Irish Cros Mhic Chéileachair, meaning 'McKelleher's Crossroads') is a townland in the civil parish of Templeport, County Cavan, Ireland. It lies in the Roman Catholic parish of Templeport and barony of Tullyhaw. The local people abbreviate it as 'Cross'.

== Geography ==
Crossmakelagher is bounded on the north by Cavanaquill and Killynaff townlands, on the west by Tonyhallagh and Tonyrevan townlands, on the south by Bellaheady and Killarah townlands in Kildallan parish and on the east by Cormeen townland in Kildallan parish and Lecharrownahone townland. Its chief geographical features are the Shannon-Erne Waterway, a small plantation, a pond, a quarry, a spring well and several dug wells. Crossmakelagher is traversed by the regional R205 road, minor roads and rural lanes and the disused Cavan and Leitrim Railway. The townland covers 197 statute acres.

== History ==
In medieval times the McGovern barony of Tullyhaw was divided into economic taxation areas called ballibetoes, from the Irish Baile Biataigh (Anglicized as 'Ballybetagh'), meaning 'A Provisioner's Town or Settlement'. The original purpose was to enable the farmer, who controlled the baile, to provide hospitality for those who needed it, such as poor people and travellers. The ballybetagh was further divided into townlands farmed by individual families who paid a tribute or tax to the head of the ballybetagh, who in turn paid a similar tribute to the clan chief. The steward of the ballybetagh would have been the secular equivalent of the erenagh in charge of church lands. There were seven ballibetoes in the parish of Templeport. Crossmakelagher was located in the ballybetagh of "Ballen Tulchoe" (alias 'Bally Tullagh'). The original Irish is Baile Tulach, meaning 'The Town of the Hillock')

Up until the 18th century, Crossmakelagher was divided into two different townlands, the part lying north of the present R205 main road was Crossmakelagher and the part between the R205 and the Shannon-Erne Waterway was called Drumcon (Irish derived place name Druim Con, meaning 'The Ridge of the Greyhounds'). Crossmakelagher was also called Barne at the time (Irish derived place name Bearn, meaning 'A Gap').

The 1609 Ulster Plantation Baronial Map depicts the townland as Cross. The 1652 Commonwealth Survey spells the name as CrossmcKelagher and the other subdivisions as Barne and Drumgoone. The 1665 Down Survey map depicts the north part as Crosmckellagher and the south part as Drumcone.

William Petty's 1685 map depicts them as Crossemckelaher and Drumcon.

In the Plantation of Ulster by grant dated 4 June 1611, along with other lands, King James VI and I granted one poll of Barne to Hugh McManus Oge Magauran. He was the great-grandson of a previous Magauran chief, Tomás mac Maghnus Mág Samhradháin who ruled from 1512 to 1532. His father, Manus Og Magauran, lived in Cor and received a pardon in 1586.

In the Plantation of Ulster by grant dated 23 June 1610, along with other lands forming the Manor of Calva, King James VI and I granted two polls of Crosse to Hugh Culme. In the same year Culme surrendered his interest to Walter Talbot of Ballyconnell. Walter Talbot died on 26 June 1625 at Ballyconnell and his son James Talbot succeeded to the Ballyconnell estate aged just 10 years. An Inquisition held in Cavan on 20 September 1630 found that James Talbot was seized of two polls of Crosse, along with other lands. James Talbot married Helen Calvert, the daughter of George Calvert, 1st Baron Baltimore of Maryland, USA, in 1635.

In the Irish Rebellion of 1641 Eleanor Reynolds of Lissanore made a deposition about the rebellion in Lissanover, which included: Ellenor Reinolds, late of Lissanore in the County of Cauan, widow aged 46 yeares or thereabouts duly sworne etc. .. She further saith that in May 1642 this deponent's mother not being able (because of age & weaknes) to goe to Croghan Castle was left behind with some of the tenants at Lissanore aforesaid, where she was about the tyme aforesaid barbarously murthered by one ffarell Groome mc Kellogher of CrossemacKellogher who confessed the said barbarous fact to divers persons that voluntarily did depose the same to be true.

In the aftermath of the Irish Rebellion of 1641, Talbot's estate was confiscated because he was a Catholic and he was granted an estate in 1655 at Castle Rubey, County Roscommon instead. He died in 1687. Talbot's land in Crossmakelagher was redistributed as follows:

The 1652 Commonwealth Survey lists the townland as belonging to 'Captain Gwilliams' (i.e. Captain Thomas Gwyllym, the landlord of Ballyconnell) and the tenants as Edward Rely & Others. The same survey also lists Barne and Drumgoone as also belonging to Captain Gwilliams. A further confirming grant dated 11 August 1666 was made from King Charles II of England to Thomas Guyllym of Ballyconnell included 52 acres 1 rood and 24 perches in Crossmackillagher, alias Crosse, alias Barne and part of the same 10 acres and 16 perches. The grant also included 47 acres 2 roods in Dromcowen, alias Drumgoney. Thomas Gwyllym died in 1681 and his son Colonel Meredith Gwyllym inherited the Ballyconnell estate, including Crossmakelagher. Colonel Meredith Gwyllym died in 1711 and the Ballyconnell estate passed to his eldest son, Meredith Gwyllym.

A deed dated 2 May 1724 by the aforesaid Meredith Gwyllym includes the townland as Crossmackillagher alias Cross alias Barne and Dromcowen alias Dromgony.

The Gwyllym estate was sold for £8,000 in 1724 to Colonel Alexander Montgomery (1686–1729) of Convoy House, County Donegal, M.P. for Donegal Borough 1725 to 1727 & for Donegal County 1727 to 1729.

A lease dated 14 May 1728 by the aforesaid Alexander Montgomery included Crossemakillagher alias Cross alias Barne and Dromcowen alias Dromconey.

Montgomery died in 1729 and left the Ballyconnell estate to his nephew George Leslie, who then assumed the name of George Leslie Montgomery. George Leslie Montgomery was M.P. for Strabane, County Tyrone from 1765 to 1768 and for County Cavan from 1770 to 1787, when he died and left the Ballyconnell estate to his son George Montgomery, whose estate was administered by the Court of Chancery as he was a lunatic. George Montgomery died in 1841 and his estate went to his Enery cousins of Bawnboy.

The 1790 Cavan Carvaghs list spells the name as Crossmakellagher.

The Tithe Applotment Books for 1827 list twelve tithepayers in the townland.

The Crossmakelagher Valuation Office Field books are available for 1839-1841.

Griffith's Valuation (1857) lists ten landholders in the townland.

== Census ==
Year	Population	Males	Females	Total Houses	Uninhabited
1841	34	19	15	8	0
1851	63	33	30	11	2
1861	49	25	24	11	1
1871	35	18	17	8	1
1881	31	18	13	7	1
1891	27	16	11	8	2

In the 1901 census of Ireland, there are eleven families listed in the townland and in the 1911 census of Ireland, there are thirteen families listed in the townland.

== Antiquities ==
There seem to be no structures of historical interest in the townland apart from the disused Cavan and Leitrim Railway. In 1739 Dean John Richardson referred to two megaliths in Crossmaclaght but there is no trace today. He may have mistaken the location.
