= Tonyhallagh =

Townland in the civil parish of Templeport, County Cavan, Ireland

Coordinates: 54.0972°N 7.6355°W

Tonyhallagh (from Irish Tonnaigh Shalach, meaning 'The Miry Pasture') is a townland in the civil parish of Templeport, County Cavan, Ireland. It lies in the Roman Catholic parish of Templeport and barony of Tullyhaw.

== Geography ==
Tonyhallagh is bounded on the north by Cavanaquill townland, on the west by Lissanover townland, on the east by Crossmakelagher townland and on the south by Killycluggin townland. Tonyhallagh's chief geographical feature is pastureland. The regional R205 road (Ireland) running between Killycluggin and Ballyconnell passes Tonyhallagh at its eastern boundary. There are only minor roads and rural lanes within the townland. The townland covers 38 statute acres.

== History ==
In medieval times the McGovern tuath of Tullyhaw was divided into economic taxation areas called ballibetoes, from the Irish Baile Biataigh (anglicized as ballybetagh), meaning 'A Provisioner's Town or Settlement'. The original purpose was to enable the farmer, who controlled the baile, to provide hospitality for those who needed it, such as poor people and travellers. The ballybetagh was further divided into townlands farmed by individual families who paid a tribute or tax to the head of the ballybetagh, who in turn paid a similar tribute to the clan chief. The steward of the ballybetagh would have been the secular equivalent of the erenagh in charge of church lands. There were seven ballibetoes in the parish of Templeport. Tonyhallagh was located in the ballybetagh of Bally Cooleigie (alias 'Bally Cowleg'). In Irish this was Baile Cúl Ó nGuaire ("The Town of Guaire's Corner"), or possibly Baile Cúl Ó Gabhair (meaning "The Town of the Goats' Corner").

The 1609 Ulster Plantation Baronial Map depicts the townland as part of Killcloggin (now the modern townland of Killycluggin).

The 1652 Commonwealth Survey spells the name as Tonyhullagh and its subdivisions as Altawnymore and Rosstawny. The 1665 Down Survey map depicts it as Tonycullagh. William Petty's 1685 map depicts it as Tonycula. Another name for the townland was Rostonimore (from Irish Ros Tonnaigh Mór, meaning 'The Wood of the Big Pasture')

In the 1938 Dúchas Folklore Collection, a story by Francis Maguire describes local legends about Tonyhallagh.

In the Plantation of Ulster by grant dated 27 February 1610, along with other lands, King James VI and I granted one poll of Tawnihulch containing 50 acres at an annual rent of £0-10s-8d to Cahill McBrien O'Reily, gentleman. Cahill McBrien O'Reily seem to be the great-grandson of the chief of the O'Reilly clan, Eamón mac Maolmórdha O’Reilly of Kilnacrott, who ruled East Breifne from October 1596 – 1601. His genealogy is Cathal son of Brian son of Seaán son of Eamón of Kilnacrott son of Maolmórdha son of Seaán son of Cathal.

Cahill O'Reilly then sold the land to Walter Talbot of Ballyconnell. An Inquisition held at Cavan Town on 14 March 1630 found that Walter Talbot died on 26 June 1625 at Ballyconnell and his son James Talbot succeeded to, inter alia, one poll in Tonenelwlagh, aged just 10 years. James Talbot married Helen Calvert, the daughter of George Calvert, 1st Baron Baltimore of Maryland in 1635 and had a son Colonel George Talbot who owned an estate in Cecil County, Maryland which he named Ballyconnell in honour of his native town in Cavan. George Talbot was appointed Surveyor-General of Maryland in 1683. In the aftermath of the Irish Rebellion of 1641, Talbot's estate in Tonyhallagh was confiscated because he was a Catholic and he was granted an estate in 1655 at Castle Rubey, County Roscommon instead. He died in 1687. In the Cromwellian Act for the Settlement of Ireland 1652 Talbot's lands in Tonyhallagh were redistributed as follows.

The 1652 Commonwealth Survey lists three parts of Tonyhallagh. One was Altawnymore, the proprietor of which was Captain Gwilliams (i.e. Captain Thomas Gwyllym of Ballyconnell) and the tenants were Edward Rely & others. They were also listed as holders of the neighbouring townlands of Crossmakelagher and Lecharrownahone. Another part was Tonyhullagh, the proprietor of which was Lieutenant John Blackforde and the tenant was Gilleesaog O'Rely. They also appear as proprietor and tenant for several other Templeport townlands. The third part was Rosstawny, the proprietor of which was Lieutenant John Blackforde.

John Blachford was born in 1598 in Ashmore, Dorset, England, the son of Richard and Frances Blachford. He became a merchant in Dorchester, Dorset but fled to France in 1633 when facing a warrant from the Exchequer for not paying customs. He married Mary Renald from Devon and died at Lissanover, County Cavan in 1661 and was buried at St. Orvins in Dublin (probably St. Audoen's, Dublin) despite wishing to be buried back in Dorchester. His will was published on 9 January 1665 leaving his son John Blachford as his sole heir. An Inquisition held in Cavan on 21 May 1667 found that his widow Mary Blachford and his heir John were seized of, inter alia, the land of Tonyhallagh alias Townehuck. He had four sons: John, Thomas, Ambrose and William (who became a Major) and two daughters, Mary and Frances. Major William Blachford was born in 1658 and died at Lissanover on 28 March 1727. The Blachford family gravestones in Templeport Church read as follows- This monument was erected by MAJOR WILLIAM / BLASHFORD of Lisnover in 1721 to the memory of / his father, JOHN BLASHFORD, late of the same Esqr. but / from Dorchester in Dorsetshire, the place of his / nativity, who in his lifetime chose this for a burying / place, for himself and family, but died in Dublin / was buried in St. Orvins Church but his wife, MARY / RENALD of a Devonsheire family is buried here / as also three sons and two daughters, viz JOHN / AMBROSE AND THOMAS; MARY AND FRANCES / Here likewise lies buried two wives of MAJOR WILLIAM BLASHFORD, son to the said JOHN BLASHFORD viz / MARY MAGHEE of an ancient Family in Lincolnsheire. CORNET CHIDLEY BLACHFORD, son to MAJOR WILLIAM BLACHFORD, leys buried here who dyed August ye 29th, 1722. This aboue MAJOR WILLIAM BLACHFORD. / That erected this monument, died the 28th of March 1727, aged 69 years.Blachford-Memorial-detail

A deed dated 10 May 1744 spells the name as Townyhullagh. The 1790 Cavan Carvaghs list spells the name as Tawnyhawlaght.

The 1836 Ordnance Survey Namebooks describe the area as "a light gravelly soil intermixed with lime stone...There is a large ancient fort near the western boundary of the townland but there is no houses of any kind."

The Tonyhallagh Valuation Office Field books are available for November 1839.

Griffith's Valuation (1857) lists one landholder in the townland.

== Census ==
Year	Population	Males	Females	Total Houses	Uninhabited
1841	25	13	12	5	0
1851	6	4	2	1	0
1861	8	5	3	2	0
1871	3	2	1	1	0
1881	3	1	2	1	0
1891	6	2	4	1	0

In the 1901 census of Ireland, there were no families resident in the townland and in the 1911 census of Ireland, there is one family listed in the townland.

== Antiquities ==
1. An earthen ring-fort (Site number 1142 in Archaeological Inventory of County Cavan, Patrick O’Donovan, 1995, where it is referred to as- Raised circular area (int. diam. 38.4m) enclosed by two low earthen banks with poorly defined shallow outer fosses. External fosse and bank are absent from WNW-N-ENE. Corresponding breaks in banks at WSW represent original entrance.)
