= Ned, Tullyhunco =

Townland in Killeshandra, Ireland

Ned (Irish derived place name, Nead meaning 'A Nest'.) is a townland in the civil parish of Killeshandra, barony of Tullyhunco, County Cavan, Ireland.

== Geography ==
Ned is bounded on the west by Clooncose, Cornasker, Corracar and Lugnagon townlands, on the south by Drumleevan townland and on the east by Cornahaia, Drumercross and Raleagh townlands. Its chief geographical features are Ned North Hill which reaches a height of 349 feet, Ned South Hill which reaches a height of 307 feet, small streams, forestry plantations and spring wells. Ned is traversed by minor public roads and rural lanes. The townland covers 323 acres.

== History ==
The 1609 Plantation of Ulster Map depicts the townland as Anead. A grant of 1611 spells the name as Neade. The 1652 Commonwealth Survey spells it as Nedd. A 1661 Inquisition spells it as The Nedd.

From medieval times up to the early 1600s, the land belonged to the McKiernan Clan. About the year 1600 it was owned by Thomas McKiernan, along with the townlands of Bellaheady, Greaghacholea or Coraghmuck and Doogary, all in Tullyhunco Barony. Thomas died some time before 1611 and his lands were inherited by his son Owen McKiernan. Owen was worried that his lands would be confiscated under the Plantation of Ulster so he made representations to the Lords of the Council in Whitehall, London. They in turn sent the following note to Arthur Chichester, 1st Baron Chichester, the Lord Deputy of Ireland- April 30, 1610. Recommend to his favourable consideration in the settlement of the natives, the bearer, Owen Carnan, who sued for 800 acres of land lying in the county of Cavan, which have belonged (as he informs them) to his father, uncle, & others his predecessors, time out of mind, without any attainder for matter of disloyalty. Owen McKiernan was only partly successful in his claim as in the Plantation of Ulster, by grant dated 4 June 1611, King James VI and I granted 100 acres or 2 poles of land in Tullyhunco at an annual rent of £1 1s. 4d., to Wony McThomas McKernan, comprising the modern-day townlands of Ned, Doogary and Coraghmuck. Owen McKiernan then sold the townland to Walter Talbot of Ballyconnell who then by deed dated 11 February 1614 sold the poll of Nedd to Sir Stephen Butler of Belturbet. Some of the McKiernans of Ned emigrated to the USA and their notable descendants included Senator Francis Kernan and General William Kernan.

After the Irish Rebellion of 1641 concluded, the townland was confiscated in the Cromwellian Settlement and the 1652 Commonwealth Survey lists it as belonging to John Pyman. An Inquisition held at Belturbet on 12 June 1661 stated that John Pyman, a shopkeeper late of Belturbet, was owner of a poll of land called The Nedd, containing 100 acres and he granted said land to William Cotten on 31 May 1653. John Pyman died on 30 September 1657 and William Cotten was in possession in 1661.

In the Hearth Money Rolls compiled on 29 September 1663 there were two Hearth Tax payers in Nedd- John Greenan and Hugh Greenan.

In the 18th century Ned came into the possession of the Hinds family. Walter Hinds (1703-1777) of Corrakane left a will dated 5 Aug 1777 and proved on 18 July 1778. His Estate was large and he named eight beneficiaries, including Martha (Faris) Hinds, Ralph Hinds, Walter Hinds, John Hinds, William Hinds, Thomas Hinds, Anne Hinds and Mary (Hinds) Clarke. He left Ned to his son Ralph as follows- To Ralph Hinds, his eldest son, the lands of Toberlion, Meelick and Duffin and the responsibility to pay his (Ralph's) brother John an annual income of £40. Also to Ralph, and to his heirs forever, the lands of Nedd and Carnagee, and £1000 to be paid out of his father's effects together with two score of the best bullocks on the lands which he is to enjoy after his father's decease. A marriage settlement dated 3 February 1784 contained, inter alia, the lands of Nedd. The will of Ralph Hinds dated 15 April 1794 and proved on 10 May 1794 included, inter alia, Nedd in the County of Cavan.

The 1790 Cavan Carvaghs list spells the townland name as Nedd.

In the 1825 Registry of Freeholders for County Cavan there were two freeholders registered in Nedd- Thomas Bannan and John McCormick. They were both Forty-shilling freeholders, holding a lease for lives from their landlord, Ralph Hinds.

The 1825 Tithe Applotment Books list fifteen tithepayers in the townland.

The Ned Valuation Office Field books are available for December 1837.

In 1855 the landlord of Ned, Charlotte Hinds, was murdered.

Griffith's Valuation of 1857 lists forty landholders in the townland.

On 17 March 1871 a rent-charge on the land belonging to the Hinds family was sold by the Landed Estates Court, including on The lands of Nedd.

== Census ==
Year	Population	Males	Females	Total Houses	Uninhabited
1841	212	110	102	44	1
1851	157	79	78	38	2
1861	114	57	57	27	1
1871	105	53	52	25	0
1881	106	55	51	21	1
1891	90	47	43	19	0

In the Census of Ireland, 1841 there were 63 families listed in the townland.

In the Census of Ireland, 1901, there were twenty families listed in the townland.

In the 1911 census of Ireland, there were eighteen families listed in the townland.

== Antiquities ==
1. A foot-stick over a stream.
