= Cormeen =

- townland

Irish transcription(s)
  - Derivation: Cor mín
  - Meaning: "smooth round hill"
- Cormeen shown within Republic of Ireland
- Country: Ireland
- County: County Cavan
- Barony: Tullyhunco
- Civil parish: Kildallan
- First recorded: 1609

Area
  - Total: 81 ha (200 acres)

Cormeen (from Irish Cor Mín, meaning 'The Smooth Round Hill') is a townland in the civil parish of Kildallan, County Cavan, Ireland. It forms part of the barony of Tullyhunco.

== Geography ==
Cormeen is bounded by the following townlands, on the north by Lecharrownahone, on the east by Agharaskilly, on the south by Killarah and on the west by Crossmakelagher. One would expect Cormeen to belong to both Templeport parish and Tullyhaw barony, as do the other surrounding townlands which lie on the west bank of the Shannon-Erne Waterway. However, in medieval times when the parish and barony boundaries were fixed, the river was at a much higher level than today and it ran north through the valley between the two hills in the townland until it reached the present day R205 road (Ireland). It then diverted back around the eastern hill in a southerly direction towards the present day course. Traces of the old river bed can be seen in the low-lying boggy ground along the road. Cormeen in medieval times was divided into two separate townlands. The part on the west bank of the river was called Ardagh (Irish either Ard Ath meaning 'The High Ford' or Ard Achadh meaning "The High Field") and the part to the east of the river was named Cormeen. The river level fell in modern times due to drainage and canalisation which caused it to divert along its current course, thus placing part of Cormeen on the west bank. Cormeen was therefore too small to exist as a townland and was merged with Ardagh to form the present townland. However, as it had always belonged to Kildallan parish it remained part of same thus giving rise to the anomaly. The Plantation of Ulster 1609 Baronial Maps of Tullyhaw and Tullyhunco show the river dividing Cormeen and Ardagh. Until the canalisation of the Woodford River in the 1850s, there was a ford across the river linking Cormeen and Killarah which was used by the inhabitants of Cormeen for passing to the large bog on the south side of the Woodford.

Its chief geographical features are the Shannon-Erne Waterway which flows north along its southern and eastern boundaries, and several small drumlin hills reaching to an altitude of 265 feet above sea-level. Cormeen is traversed by the R205 road (Ireland), some minor lanes and the disused Cavan and Leitrim Railway. The townland covers 200 acres, including 3 acres of water.

== History ==
In medieval times the McGovern barony of Tullyhaw was divided into economic taxation areas called ballibetoes, from the Irish Baile Biataigh (Anglicized as 'Ballybetagh'), meaning 'A Provisioner's Town or Settlement'. The original purpose was to enable the farmer, who controlled the baile, to provide hospitality for those who needed it, such as poor people and travellers. The ballybetagh was further divided into townlands farmed by individual families who paid a tribute or tax to the head of the ballybetagh, who in turn paid a similar tribute to the clan chief. The steward of the ballybetagh would have been the secular equivalent of the erenagh in charge of church lands. There were seven ballibetoes in the parish of Templeport. The Ardagh part of Cormeen was located in the ballybetagh of "Ballen Tulchoe" (alias 'Bally Tullagh'). The original Irish is Baile Tulach, meaning 'The Town of the Hillock'.

The earliest surviving mention of the townland is on the 1609 Plantation of Ulster Baronial map of the barony of Tullyhunco, where it is spelled Corume. The 1652 Commonwealth Survey spells the townland as Cormeene.

In the Plantation of Ulster by grant dated 23 June 1610, along with other lands forming the Manor of Calva, King James VI and I granted one poll of Cormine otherwise Ardagh to Hugh Culme. In the same year Culme surrendered his interest to Walter Talbot of Ballyconnell. In an inquisition of King Charles I held at Cavan on 20 September 1630 it stated that James Talbott of Beallaconnell owned the townland of Cormyny alias Ardagh, containing one poll, having received it as part of the Ballyconnell estate on the death of his father Walter Talbot on 26 June 1625. Talbot's land was confiscated in the Cromwellian Settlement and the 1652 Commonwealth Survey lists the townland as belonging to Lieutenant-Colonel Tristam Beresford. By a further confirming grant from King Charles II on 6 November 1666, the lands of Cormeene containing 78 acres &1 rood was granted to the aforementioned Sir Tristram Beresford, 1st Baronet at an annual rent of £1-1s-1½d. On 11 September 1670 Cormeene was created as part of the Manor of Beresford.

A deed by Arthur Ellis dated 19 Mar 1768 includes the lands of Cormeen.

A deed by Gore Ellis dated 24 Feb 1776 includes the lands of Cormeen.

The 1790 Cavan Carvaghs list spells the name as Cormeen.

The Tithe Applotment Books for 1827 list the following tithepayers in the townland: Finnegan, Albert, Freehill, Reilly, Bows, Creighton, Pennell, Veitch.

The Cormeen Valuation Office books are available for 1838.

Griffith's Valuation of 1857 lists four occupiers in the townland.

In the Dúchas Schools' Collection, a story by John Murphy, Derryliffe, in 1938 relates a ghost story that occurred in Cormeen. In the same collection is a description of Cormeen in 1938 by the O'Reilly family of Cormeen.

== Census ==
Year	Population	Males	Females	Total Houses	Uninhabited
1841	27	14	13	4	1
1851	28	14	14	4	0
1861	19	10	9	4	0
1871	14	8	6	3	0
1881	23	12	11	3	0
1891	15	8	7	4	0

In the 1901 census of Ireland, there are seven families listed in the townland.

In the 1911 census of Ireland, there are eight families listed in the townland.

== Antiquities ==
1. A medieval earthen ringfort just south of the Ballyconnell-Ballinamore road, (Archaeological Inventory of County Cavan, Patrick O’Donovan, 1995, where it is described as- Situated on the NNE slope of a drumlin ridge. It formerly comprised (OPW 1969) a raised circular area (int. dims. 33.4m NNW-SSE; 33m ENE-WSW) enclosed by a low earthen bank. Original entrance not recognisable. Site has been levelled. Not visible at ground level).
2. A medieval earthen ringfort in the centre of the townland, (Archaeological Inventory of County Cavan, Patrick O’Donovan, 1995, where it is described as- Raised circular area (int. diam. 42m) enclosed by slight remains of a low earthen bank. An earlier report (OPW 1969) suggested that the original entrance may have been at ESE or WNW).
3. A medieval earthen ringfort on the southern bank of the Shannon-Erne Waterway, (Archaeological Inventory of County Cavan, Patrick O’Donovan, 1995, where it is described as- Marked 'Fort' on OS 1836 ed. and shown as occupying a small area of low-lying ground between the Woodford River and a stream. The stream was diverted in 1847 (local information) at which time the site was presumably levelled. The outline of a small circular enclosure (diam. c. 23.3m) may still be traced).
4. The Cormeen Brooch. Found during the excavation of the Woodford canal in the 1840s, an 8th-century copper-alloy brooch-pin
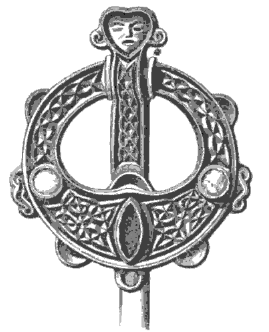
  Cormeen Brooch
  which is now in the Royal Irish Academy.
5. A Bronze Age socketed-axe was found 4 feet below the bed of the canal in Cormeen, also during the excavation of the Woodford canal in the 1840s. It is now in the National Museum of Ireland.
6. A Celtic carved stone head was found digging potatoes in the townland and is now in the possession of the McGovern family of Cormeen.
