= Bellaheady =

Townland in County Cavan, Ireland

Bellaheady (Irish derived place name, either Béal Átha Héide meaning 'The Entrance to the Ford of Éadach' or Béal Átha an Fheadha meaning 'The Entrance to the Ford of the Wood'. Also called Rossbressal = Ros Breasail = Breasal’s Wood) is a townland in the civil parish of Templeport, barony of Tullyhunco, County Cavan, Ireland.

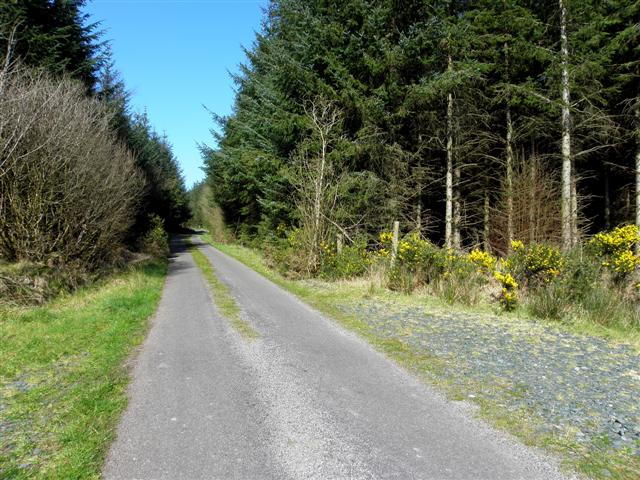
Geograph-2870431-by-Kenneth--Allen

== Geography ==
Bellaheady is bounded on the west by Corran, County Cavan and Killycluggin townlands, on the east by Killarah townland, on the south by Toberlyan Duffin townland and on the north by Crossmakelagher and Tonyrevan townlands. Its chief geographical features are the Shannon-Erne Waterway, small streams, forestry plantations, quarries, dug wells and spring wells. Bellaheady is traversed by the R205 road (Ireland), minor public roads, rural lanes and the disused Cavan and Leitrim Railway. The townland covers 220 acres, including 10 acres of water.

== History ==
Until the 1650s, Bellaheady was paired with the townland of Killarah, the lands being split by the river but the names of the two parts were interchangeable, being called either Bellheady, Rossbressal or Killarah. Locals and the Ordnance Survey still refer to part of Killarah as Bellaheady Mountain.

From medieval times up to the early 1600s, the land belonged to the McKiernan Clan. About the year 1600 it was owned by Thomas McKiernan, along with the townlands of Ned, Coraghmuck and Doogary, all in Tullyhunco Barony. Thomas died some time before 1611 and his lands were inherited by his son Owen McKiernan. The Plantation of Ulster 1609 Baronial Map depicts Rosbrazill on the west side of the river but does not depict the townland of Killarah on the east side, because the lands in Tullyhunco were supposed to be set aside for English servitors but Killarah was granted to an Irish native in contravention of the rules, so the mappers avoided the problem by not mapping Killarah. Owen McKiernan was worried that his lands would be confiscated under the Plantation of Ulster so he made representations to the Lords of the Council in Whitehall, London. They in turn sent the following note to Arthur Chichester, 1st Baron Chichester, the Lord Deputy of Ireland- April 30, 1610. Recommend to his favourable consideration in the settlement of the natives, the bearer, Owen Carnan, who sued for 800 acres of land lying in the county of Cavan, which have belonged (as he informs them) to his father, uncle, & others his predecessors, time out of mind, without any attainder for matter of disloyalty. Owen McKiernan was only partly successful in his claim as the part of Rosbrazill (now the townland of Bellaheady) on the west side of the river was granted to Hugh Culme on 23 June 1610. In the Plantation of Ulster, by grant dated 23 June 1610, King James VI and I granted one poll of Rossebrissell otherwise Killara, along with other lands forming the Manor of Calva, to Hugh Culme. In the same year, Culme surrendered his interest to Walter Talbot of Ballyconnell. In an inquisition of King Charles I, held at Cavan on 20 September 1630, it stated that James Talbott of Beallaconnell owned the townland of Rosbreassell alias Killarra, containing one poll, having received it as part of the Ballyconnell estate on the death of his father Walter Talbot on 26 June 1625. Talbot’s land was taken over by rebels during the Irish Rebellion of 1641.

At Cavan, on 26 July 1642, Thomas and William Jones gave the names of rebel leaders in Cavan, including Owen Mc William of Rosbreske, Donogh Mc Kernan of same and William Mc Kernan of same. After the rebellion concluded, the land was confiscated in the Cromwellian Settlement and the 1652 Commonwealth Survey lists the townland as belonging to Lieutenant-Colonel Tristam Beresford. By a further confirming grant from King Charles II, on 6 November 1666, the lands of Rospressell containing 2 poles or 431 acres & 31 perches was granted to the aforementioned Sir Tristram Beresford, 1st Baronet at an annual rent of £5-16s-5d. On 11 September 1670 Respressol was created as part of the Manor of Beresford.

In the Hearth Money Rolls compiled on 29 September 1663 there were five Hearth Tax payers in Rosbressel- John Hakins, Phillip Reilly, Phillip O Mane, Shane McLaghlyn and Tirlagh O Cuillin.

A lease dated 26 January 1751 mentions Arthur Ellis, Edward Ellis and Frederick Ellis, all of Ballyheady.

In the Cavan Poll Book of 1761, there was one person registered to vote in Ballyheady in the Irish general election, 1761 - Gore Ellis who lived in the townland but who also had a freehold in Burren (townland) . He was entitled to cast two votes. The four election candidates were Charles Coote, 1st Earl of Bellomont and Lord Newtownbutler (later Brinsley Butler, 2nd Earl of Lanesborough), both of whom were then elected Member of Parliament for Cavan County. The losing candidates were George Montgomery (MP) of Ballyconnell and Barry Maxwell, 1st Earl of Farnham. Ellis voted for Coote and Montgomery. Absence from the poll book either meant a resident did not vote or more likely was not a freeholder entitled to vote, which would mean most of the inhabitants of Bellaheady.

A deed dated 19 Mar 1768 includes the lands of Ballyhady otherwise Rossbressell.

A marriage settlement dated 29 October 1768 refers to Arthur Ellis, Hercules Ellis and Jane Ellis, all of Ballyheady.

A deed by Gore Ellis dated 24 Feb 1776 includes the lands of Ballyhady otherwise Rossbressill.

Ambrose Leet's 1814 Directory spells the name as Ballyheady.

The Tithe Applotment Books for 1827 list one tithepayer in the townland

A description exists dated 23 September 1833 about farming in Bellaheady from Alexander Still, the steward of the Beresford Estate.

The Bellaheady Valuation Office books are available for 1838.

Griffith's Valuation of 1857 lists six occupiers in the townland.

== Census ==
Year	Population	Males	Females	Total Houses	Uninhabited
1841	35	15	20	7	0
1851	29	15	14	5	0
1861	30	16	14	6	0
1871	20	9	11	5	1
1881	12	6	6	4	2
1891	8	3	5	4	2

In the 1901 census of Ireland, there are five families listed in the townland.

In the 1911 census of Ireland, there are nine families listed in the townland.

== Antiquities ==
1. Rath. The 'Archaeological Inventory of County Cavan' (Site No. 249) describes it as-Marked 'Fort' on OS 1836 and 1876 eds. Situated close to the summit of a drumlin hill. Not visible at ground level.
2. Hilltop Enclosure. The 'Archaeological Inventory of County Cavan' (Site No. 1460) describes it as- Not marked as an antiquity on any OS ed. but known locally as a 'fort'. Oval area (int. dims. c. 160m NE-SW; 100m NW-SE) enclosed by a low earthen bank and a wide, shallow fosse, both of which have been modified and incorporated into the field boundary, the area NE of which has been levelled leaving nothing visible at ground level. The site is divided into two roughly equal portions by a field boundary running NW-SE. Original entrance not recognisable.
3. Ballyheady Railway Station and two Level Crossings.
4. Bellaheady Bridge. This is situated on the site of the ancient ford which gives the townland its name. Sometime between 1655 and 1850 a bridge was erected there. It consisted of eight unequal arches, the largest next to the south bank, which diminished in size towards the north, on which side the two extreme arches were at a considerable distance from the other six, the piers of which were of an extraordinary thickness. This old bridge was removed in 1850 during the canalisation of the Shannon-Erne Waterway. The present bridge was then erected.
5. A 19th century eel-weir
6. A lime-kiln
