= Cornasker =

Townland in County Cavan, Ireland

Coordinates: 54.0302°N 7.6370°W

Cornasker (Irish language derived place name, Corr na Sceire meaning 'The Round Hill of the Jagged Rock'.) is a townland in the civil parish of Kildallan, barony of Tullyhunco, County Cavan, Ireland.

== Geography ==
Cornasker is bounded on the south by Ned, Tullyhunco townland and on the east by Raleagh townland. Its chief geographical features are small streams, a forestry plantation and a spring well. Cornasker is traversed by minor public roads and rural lanes. The townland covers 50 acres.

== History ==
Up until the 18th century, Cornasker formed part of the townland of Cornahaia and its history is the same until then. A 1629 inquisition spells the name as Corneskear.

From medieval times up to the early 1600s, the land belonged to the McKiernan Clan. An Inquisition held at Ballyconnell on 2 November 1629 stated that Sir James Craig owned the poll of Cornehae which contained, inter alia, a sub-division named Corneskear. Sir James Craig died in the siege of Croaghan Castle on 8 April 1642. His land was inherited by his brother John Craig of Craig Castle, County Cavan and of Craigston, County Leitrim, who was chief doctor to both King James I and Charles I.

Lord John Carmichael (1710–1787), the 4th Earl of Hyndford of Castle Craig, County Cavan, inherited the lands from the Craig estate. In 1758 Carmichael sold the lands to the Farnham Estate of Cavan. The estate papers are now in the National Library of Ireland. The documents mentioning Cornasker are at reference number MS 41,114 /6.

The 1790 Cavan Carvaghs list spells the townland name as Cornesker.

The Cornasker Valuation Office Field books are available for May 1838.

In the 19th century the landlord of Cornasker was William Cook.

Griffith's Valuation of 1857 lists one landholder in the townland.

== Census ==
Year	Population	Males	Females	Total Houses	Uninhabited
1841	8	6	2	2	0
1851	11	8	3	2	1
1861	8	6	2	2	0
1871	3	2	1	2	1
1881	6	2	4	2	0
1891	9	5	4	2	0

In the 1901 census of Ireland, there was one family listed in the townland.

In the 1911 census of Ireland, there was one family listed in the townland.
