= Raleagh =

Townland in County Cavan, Ireland

Raleagh (Irish-derived place name, either Ráth Liath meaning 'The Grey Fort' or Ráth Liadhach meaning 'The Fort of the Grey People') is a townland in the civil parish of Kildallan, barony of Tullyhunco, County Cavan, Ireland. The townland is also called Derrinaherk (Irish-derived place name Doire na Thoirc meaning 'the Oakwood of the Wild Boars'), according to the Tithe Applotment Books 1823–1837.

== Geography ==
Raleagh is bounded on the north by Burren (townland), on the east by Cornahaia, Derrinlester and Doogary townlands, on the south by Ned, Tullyhunco townland and on the west by Cornasker and Lugnagon townlands. Its chief geographical features are small streams, forestry plantations and spring wells. Raleagh is traversed by the regional R199 road (Ireland), minor public roads and rural lanes. The townland covers 283 acres.

== History ==
The Ulster Plantation Baronial map of 1609 depicts the name as Relieagh. The Ulster Plantation grants of 1610 spell the townland name as Rolliagh. The 1641 Depositions spell the name as Rillaigh. The 1652 Commonwealth Survey spells the townland as Rellyagh. The 1665 Down Survey map depicts it as Raleagh. William Petty's map of 1685 depicts it as Raleagh.

From medieval times up to the early 1600s, the land belonged to the McKiernan Clan. In the Plantation of Ulster by grant dated 27 February 1610, along with other lands, King James VI and I granted one poll of Rolliagh containing 50 acres at an annual rent of £0-10s-8d to Cahill McBrien O'Reily, gentleman. Cahill McBrien O'Reily seem to be the great-grandson of the chief of the O'Reilly clan, Eamón mac Maolmórdha O’Reilly of Kilnacrott, who ruled East Breifne from October 1596 – 1601. His genealogy is Cathal son of Brian son of Seaán son of Eamón of Kilnacrott son of Maolmórdha son of Seaán son of Cathal.

Patrick Sheridan of Raleagh took part in the Irish Rebellion of 1641. He was the son of the Sheridan chief, William O'Sheridan of Corran, County Cavan and an ancestor of the famous Sheridan theatrical family. In a deposition dated 26 July 1642, Thomas Jones of Drumminnion, Kildallan parish stated that on the 17th of November 1641 the deponent Thomas Jones by the procurement of Phillip mac Hugh mac Shane Rely, Edmond Rely, Hugh mac Shane mac Phillip Rely and Hugh mac Molmore Rely, was robbed by Patt Sheridan of Rillaigh, Donell Oge McKernan and his nephew heire of Aighaveny, Laighlen Oge O'Rorke de Killnemarue and Bryan O'Rorke of the same, of the goods following, viz. eightene melch Cowes price 36 li. ster, six heffers in calfe, six pownds sterling; three yearelings 30 s. sterling, foure horsses 12 li. sterling, Corne & hay price 4 0li. sterling, in ready mony x li. 10 s. sterling, in househould stuffe as plate pewter brasse, lynen wollen beddinge and apparell with other necessaries 40 li. sterling, in proffitts of lands per annum in the said County 16 li. sterling,.

After the Irish Rebellion of 1641 concluded, the townland was confiscated in the Cromwellian Settlement and the 1652 Commonwealth Survey lists it as belonging to James Thornton. In the Hearth Money Rolls compiled on 29 September 1663 there were six Hearth Tax payers in Reliagh – William Ranick, Thomas Mauity, Mary Sharpe, Donogh O’Corkran, Patrick McManus and Shane McEnlea.

A deed by Arthur Ellis dated 19 Mar 1768 includes the lands of Reliah.

A deed by Gore Ellis dated 24 Feb 1776 includes the lands of Reliagh.

The 1790 Cavan Carvaghs list spells the name as Reliagh.

The Tithe Applotment Books 1823-1837 list seventeen tithepayers in the townland.

The Raleagh Valuation Office Field books are available for May 1838.

Griffith's Valuation of 1857 lists twenty landholders in the townland.

In the 19th century the landlord of Raleagh was William Cook.

== Census ==
Year	Population	Males	Females	Total Houses	Uninhabited
1841	169	84	85	32	0
1851	119	59	60	20	0
1861	89	48	41	16	0
1871	81	38	43	16	0
1881	88	39	49	16	0
1891	83	37	46	15	0

In the 1901 census of Ireland, there were fifteen families listed in the townland.

In the 1911 census of Ireland, there were eighteen families listed in the townland.

== Antiquities ==
1. Two 19th-century hedge-schools
2. Doogarry Post Office
3. A lime kiln
