= Derrinlester =

Townland in County Cavan, Ireland

Derrinlester (Irish derived place name, Doire na Leastar meaning 'The Oakwood of the Wooden Vessels'.) is a townland in the civil parish of Kildallan, barony of Tullyhunco, County Cavan, Ireland.

== Geography ==
Derrinlester is bounded on the west by Raleagh townland, on the east by Tonaloy townland, on the south by Cornahaia townland and on the north by Doogary and Killygorman townlands. Its chief geographical features are streams and spring wells. Derrinlester is traversed by minor public roads and rural lanes. The townland covers 116 acres.

== History ==
The Ulster Plantation Baronial map of 1609 depicts the name as Derinsester. The Ulster Plantation grants of 1611 spell the townland name as Derrenelester. A 1615 lease spells the name as Derranlester. A 1629 inquisition spells the name as Derranlester. A 1630 inquisition spells the name as Dirrinilester. A 1631 grant spells the name as Derranlester. The 1652 Commonwealth Survey spells the townland as Direnlester.

From medieval times up to the early 1600s, the land belonged to the McKiernan Clan. In the Plantation of Ulster in 1609 the lands of the McKiernans were confiscated, but some were later regranted to them. In the Plantation of Ulster grant dated 4 June 1611, King James VI and I granted 400 acres (160 hectares) or 7 poles (a poll is the local name for townland) of land in Tullyhunco at an annual rent of £4 5s. 4d., to Bryan McKearnan, gentleman, comprising the modern-day townlands of Clontygrigny, Cornacrum, Cornahaia, Derrinlester, Dring, Drumlarah, Ardlougher and Kiltynaskellan. Under the terms of the grant, McKearnan was obliged to build a house on this land. The said Brian 'Bán' Mág Tighearnán (anglicized 'Blonde' Brian McKiernan) was chief of the McKiernan Clan of Tullyhunco, County Cavan, Ireland from 1588 until his death on 4 September 1622. In a visitation by George Carew, 1st Earl of Totnes in autumn 1611, it was recorded, McKyernan removed to his proportion and is about building a house. On 23 March 1615, Mág Tighearnán granted a lease on these lands to James Craig. On 14 March 1630, an Inquisition of King Charles I of England held in Cavan Town stated that Brian bane McKiernan died on 4 September 1622, and his lands comprising seven poles and three pottles in Clonkeen, Clontygrigny, Cornacrum, Derrinlester, Dring townland, Killygorman, Kiltynaskellan and Mullaghdoo, Cavan went to his nearest relatives. The most likely inheritors being Cahill, son of Owen McKiernan; Brian, son of Turlough McKiernan and Farrell, son of Phelim McKiernan, all aged over 21 and married. On 26 April 1631 a re-grant was made to Sir James Craige, which included the lands of Derranlester, which also included sub-divisions in the townland called Knockcollen, Sheeran, Gerradus, Derrinkeister, Corlemadrum, Aghanmore and Derrinleister. Sir James Craig died in the siege of Croaghan Castle on 8 April 1642. His land was inherited by his brother John Craig of Craig Castle, County Cavan and of Craigston, County Leitrim, who was chief doctor to both King James I and Charles I.

After the Irish Rebellion of 1641 concluded, the rebels vacated the land and the 1652 Commonwealth Survey lists the townland as belonging to Lewis Craig. In the Hearth Money Rolls compiled on 29 September 1663 there were two Hearth Tax payers in Dirnilester- Shane McKernan and Philip McGaghran.

The 1790 Cavan Carvaghs list spells the townland name as Dirrinlester.

After the Battle of Ballinamuck in 1798, one of the rebels took refuge with the magistrate McGee of Derrinlester.

Ambrose Leet's 1814 Directory spells the name as Derrinlester.

The Tithe Applotment Books of 1837 list seven tithepayers in the townland.

The Derrinlester Valuation Office books are available for April 1838.

In the 19th century the landlord of Derrinlester was the Reverend Francis Saunderson (b.1786), who was Church of Ireland rector of Kildallan from 1828 until his death on 22 December 1873.

Griffith's Valuation of 1857 lists five landholders in the townland.

== Census ==
Year	Population	Males	Females	Total Houses	Uninhabited
1841	55	32	23	9	0
1851	34	22	12	6	0
1861	25	13	12	5	0
1871	25	12	13	5	1
1881	17	9	8	4	0
1891	18	8	10	4	0

In the 1901 census of Ireland, there were six families listed in the townland.

In the 1911 census of Ireland, there were seven families listed in the townland.

== Antiquities ==
1. Leslie's river ford
