= Lecharrownahone =

Townland in the civil parish of Templeport, County Cavan, Ireland

Coordinates: 54.07514°N 7.810271°W

Lecharrownahone (from Irish Leathcheathrú na hAbhann, meaning 'The half-quarterland of the river' - Local pronunciation is 'Laher-na-hone') is a townland in the civil parish of Templeport, County Cavan, Ireland. It lies in the Roman Catholic parish of Templeport and barony of Tullyhaw.

== Geography ==
Lecharrownahone is bounded on the north by Carrowmore, County Cavan and Derryginny townlands in Tomregan parish and by Drumane townland, on the west by Killynaff and Crossmakelagher townlands, on the south by Cormeen townland in Kildallan parish and on the east by Agharaskilly townland in Tomregan parish. Its chief geographical features are the Shannon-Erne Waterway and the Crooked River (Ireland). Lecharrownahone is traversed by the regional R205 road, several rural lanes and the disused Cavan and Leitrim Railway. The townland covers 314 statute acres.

== History ==
In medieval times the McGovern barony of Tullyhaw was divided into economic taxation areas called ballibetoes, from the Irish Baile Biataigh (Anglicized as 'Ballybetagh'), meaning 'A Provisioner's Town or Settlement'. The original purpose was to enable the farmer, who controlled the baile, to provide hospitality for those who needed it, such as poor people and travellers. The ballybetagh was further divided into townlands farmed by individual families who paid a tribute or tax to the head of the ballybetagh, who in turn paid a similar tribute to the clan chief. The steward of the ballybetagh would have been the secular equivalent of the erenagh in charge of church lands. There were seven ballibetoes in the parish of Templeport. Lecharrownahone was located in the ballybetagh of "Ballen Tulchoe" (alias 'Bally Tullagh'). The original Irish is Baile Tulach, meaning 'The Town of the Hillock')

The Plantation of Ulster 1609 Baronial Map depicts the townland as Nahowen. A 1610 grant spells it as Nahownee. A 1630 Inquisition spells it as Nationna. The 1652 Commonwealth Survey lists the townland Lehcharrownehowen. A 1660 grant spells it as Lacaranehane, alias Nahone, alias Lackanehone. The 1665 Down Survey map depicts it as Lackaneaghone. William Petty's map of 1685 depicts it as Lakanhon.

In the Plantation of Ulster by grant dated 23 June 1610, along with other lands forming the Manor of Calva, King James VI and I granted two polls of Nahownee to Hugh Culme. In the same year Culme surrendered his interest to Walter Talbot of Ballyconnell. Walter Talbot died on 26 June 1625 at Ballyconnell and his son James Talbot succeeded to the Ballyconnell estate aged just 10 years. An Inquisition held in Cavan on 20 September 1630 found that James Talbot was seized of two polls of Nationna, along with other lands. James Talbot married Helen Calvert, the daughter of George Calvert, 1st Baron Baltimore of Maryland, USA, in 1635. In the aftermath of the Irish Rebellion of 1641 James Talbot's estate was confiscated because he was a Catholic and he was granted an estate in 1655 at Castle Rubey, County Roscommon instead. He died in 1687. Talbot's land in Lecharrownahone was distributed as follows-

The 1652 Commonwealth Survey lists the townland as belonging to Captain Gwilliams (i.e. the landlord of Ballyconnell, Captain Thomas Gwyllym) and the tenants as Edward Rely & Others. In the Hearth Money Rolls compiled on 29 September 1663 there were four Hearth Tax payers in Lecarrownehawna- Brian O Relly, Teige O Clery, William McMurphy and Owen McMurphy. A further confirming grant dated 11 August 1666 was made from King Charles II of England to Thomas Guyllym of Ballyconnell including 200 acres 3 roods and 8 perches in Lacaranehane, alias Nahone, alias Lackanehone. Thomas Gwyllym died in 1681 and his son Colonel Meredith Gwyllym inherited the Ballyconnell estate, including Lecharrownahone. Colonel Meredith Gwyllym died in 1711 and the Ballyconnell estate passed to his eldest son, Meredith Gwyllym.

A deed dated 2 May 1724 by the aforesaid Meredith Gwyllym includes the townland as Lacaranehave alias Nahove alias Lackaneohove.

The Gwyllym estate was sold for £8,000 in 1724 to Colonel Alexander Montgomery (1686–1729) of Convoy House, County Donegal, M.P. for Donegal Borough 1725 to 1727 & for Donegal County 1727 to 1729.

A lease dated 14 May 1728 by the aforesaid Alexander Montgomery included Lecaranehave alias Nahane alias Lackanohane.

Montgomery died in 1729 and left the Ballyconnell estate to his nephew George Leslie, who then assumed the name of George Leslie Montgomery. George Leslie Montgomery was M.P. for Strabane, County Tyrone from 1765 to 1768 and for County Cavan from 1770 to 1787, when he died and left the Ballyconnell estate to his son George Montgomery, whose estate was administered by the Court of Chancery as he was a lunatic. George Montgomery died in 1841 and his estate went to his Enery cousins of Bawnboy. In 1856 they sold the estate to take advantage of its increased value owing to the opening of the Woodford Canal through the town in the same year. The estate, including Lecharrownahone, was split up among different purchasers and maps & details of previous leases of the sold parts are still available.

In the Templeport Poll Book of 1761 there were only three people registered to vote in Lecarnahone in the 1761 Irish general election - William Chambers, Simon Fisher and William Taylor. They were entitled to two votes each. All three voted for Charles Coote, 1st Earl of Bellomont who was elected Member of Parliament for Cavan County and for George Montgomery (MP) of Ballyconnell, who lost the election. It was no surprise they voted for Montgomery as he was their landlord. Absence from the poll book either meant a resident did not vote or more likely was not a freeholder entitled to vote, which would mean most of the inhabitants of Lecharrownahone.

The 1790 Cavan Carvaghs list spells the name as Leearunehone.

The Tithe Applotment Books for 1827 list twenty six tithepayers in the townland.

The Lecharrownahone Valuation Office Field books are available for 1840-1841.

Griffith's Valuation of 1857 lists thirty six landholders in the townland.

== Census ==
Year	Population	Males	Females	Total Houses	Uninhabited
1841	128	61	67	21	0
1851	87	41	46	17	1
1861	67	34	33	16	0
1871	61	28	33	13	0
1881	61	31	30	12	0
1891	54	29	25	12	1

In the 1901 census of Ireland, there are ten families listed in the townland, and in the 1911 census of Ireland, there are eleven families listed in the townland.

== Antiquities ==
The chief structures of historical interest in the townland are:

1. An earthen ringfort.
2. An earthen ringfort.
