= Killycluggin Stone =

Ancient artifact found in Ireland

Coordinates: 54.0924°N 7.6359°W

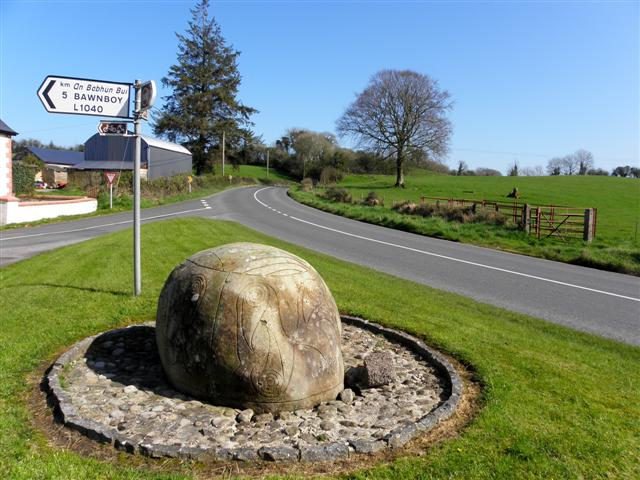
A somewhat misleading replica of the Killycluggin Stone

The Killycluggin Stone is a large decorated stone dated probably from the second half of the first millennium BC, during what prehistorians call the Iron Age. The Killyclugin stone was found in the townland of Killycluggin, County Cavan, in Ireland. Dating roughly from when the first Celtic peoples arrived in Ireland. Celtic style culture of this period is called La Tène designs, it was discovered broken in several pieces, partly buried close to a stone circle, inside which it probably once stood. The original stone is preserveed inside in the Cavan County Museum, while an imperfect replica copy stands near the road about 300 metres from the original site.

Although now much damaged, the stone can be reconstructed from the different surviving pieces. It was at least 6 feet high. At the base of the stone there were four rectangular adjoining panels measuring 90 cm each in width giving a circumference of 3 m 60 cm when it was first carved. The height of each panel was about 75 cm.

== Find site and associations ==
The stone was found in 1921 at Killycluggin, County Cavan. The site has several associations with St. Patrick. Nearby is Tobar Padraig (St. Patrick's Well), and Kilnavert Church, which is said to have been founded by Patrick. The current town of Kilnavert was originally called Fossa Slécht or Rath Slécht, from which the wider area called Magh Slécht was named.

The 14th century Book of McGovern, written in Magh Slécht, contains a poem which states that Crom was situated at Kilnavert beside the road and that the local women used to tremble in fear as they passed by. There is still a local tradition in the area that the Killycluggin stone is the Crom stone.

== Interpretation and speculations ==
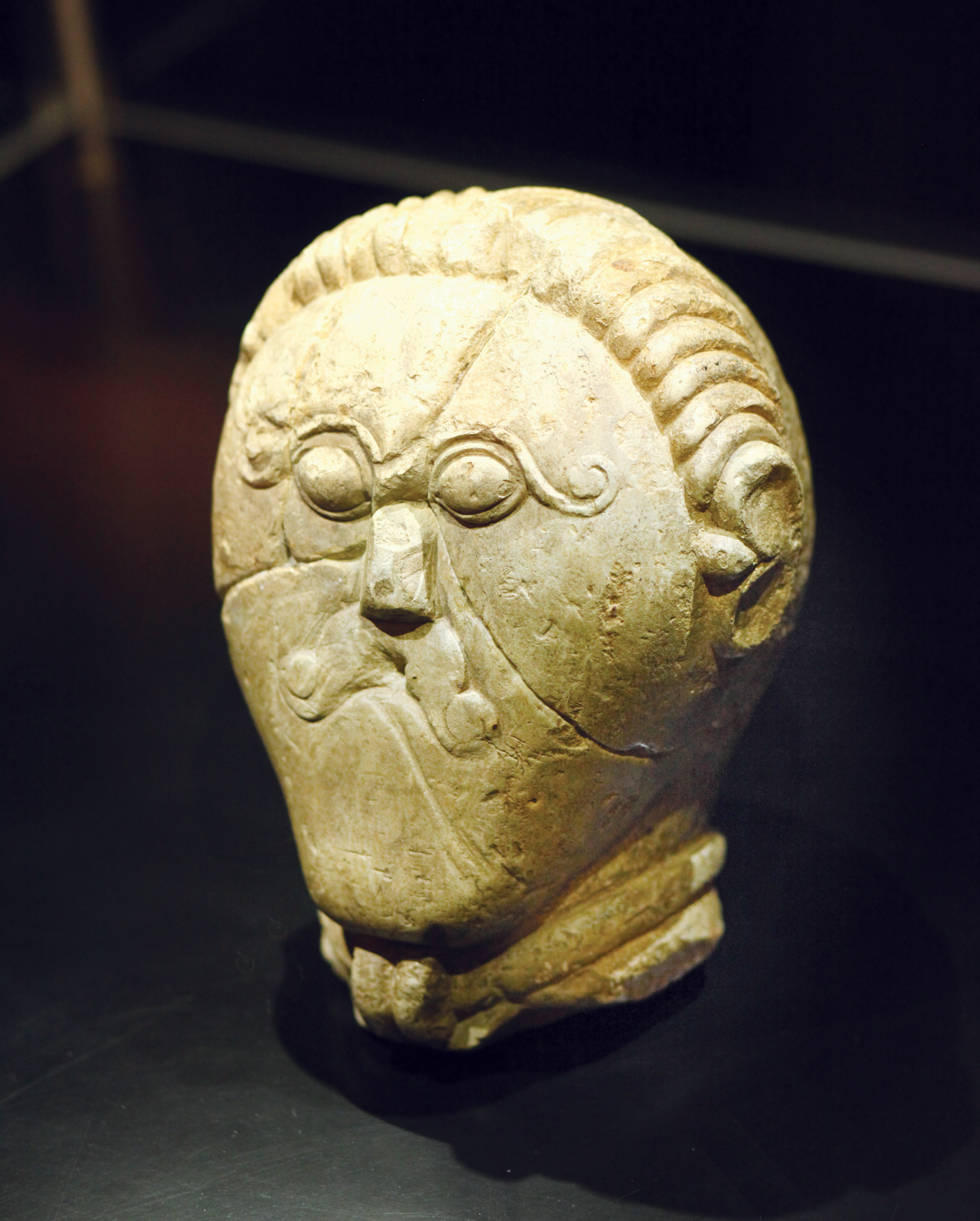
A different Celtic stone sculpture, the Mšecké Žehrovice Head which was found in the Czech Republic, is thought to be similar in type to the carved Killycluggin stone before it was damaged.

The Killycluggin Stone has been interpreted by some as the cult image of the pre-Christian native god Crom Cruach. O'Kelly, however, refers to this image as Crom Dubh. When excavated and placed upright on its flat base, it was found to lean obliquely from the vertical, perhaps explaining the name Crom, "bent, crooked".

The top of the stone has a hair-motif which is found on other La Tène sculptures, such as the Celtic hero head from Mšecké Žehrovice in the Czech Republic. The inference is that the Killycluggin stone was an anthropomorphic figure with a human face, which was the part that was smashed to pieces. Support for this is given by:

- Françoise Henry in her book Irish Art in the Early Christian Period, p. 11 wherein she states, "the ornaments engraved on the stone of Killycluggin sides seems to be the edge of a garment."
- The Quarta Vita of Saint Patrick written c. 800 A.D. states, "But the demon, who was in the idol, fearing St. Patrick, turned the stone towards its right side, and the mark of the staff still remains in its left side." A cone-shaped stone would not have a left or right side unless it had a human face.
- The Vita tripartita Sancti Patricii written c. 1100 A.D. states, "But the idol leaned over towards the sunset on its right side, for it is southwards its face was, i.e. to Tara. And the mark of Patric's staff still remains in its left side." Again this reference to a face.
- The Metrical Dindsenchas written c. 1160 A.D. states: "Patrick of Armagh plied a sledge-hammer on Crom from his head to his foot: he removed with rough soldier-deed the weak image that was here."
- By the human figure incised on the Killinagh Crom Cruaich stone.
- The stone head of Crom in Cloghane, Co. Kerry
