= Cavan County Museum =

- Músaem Chontae an Chabháin
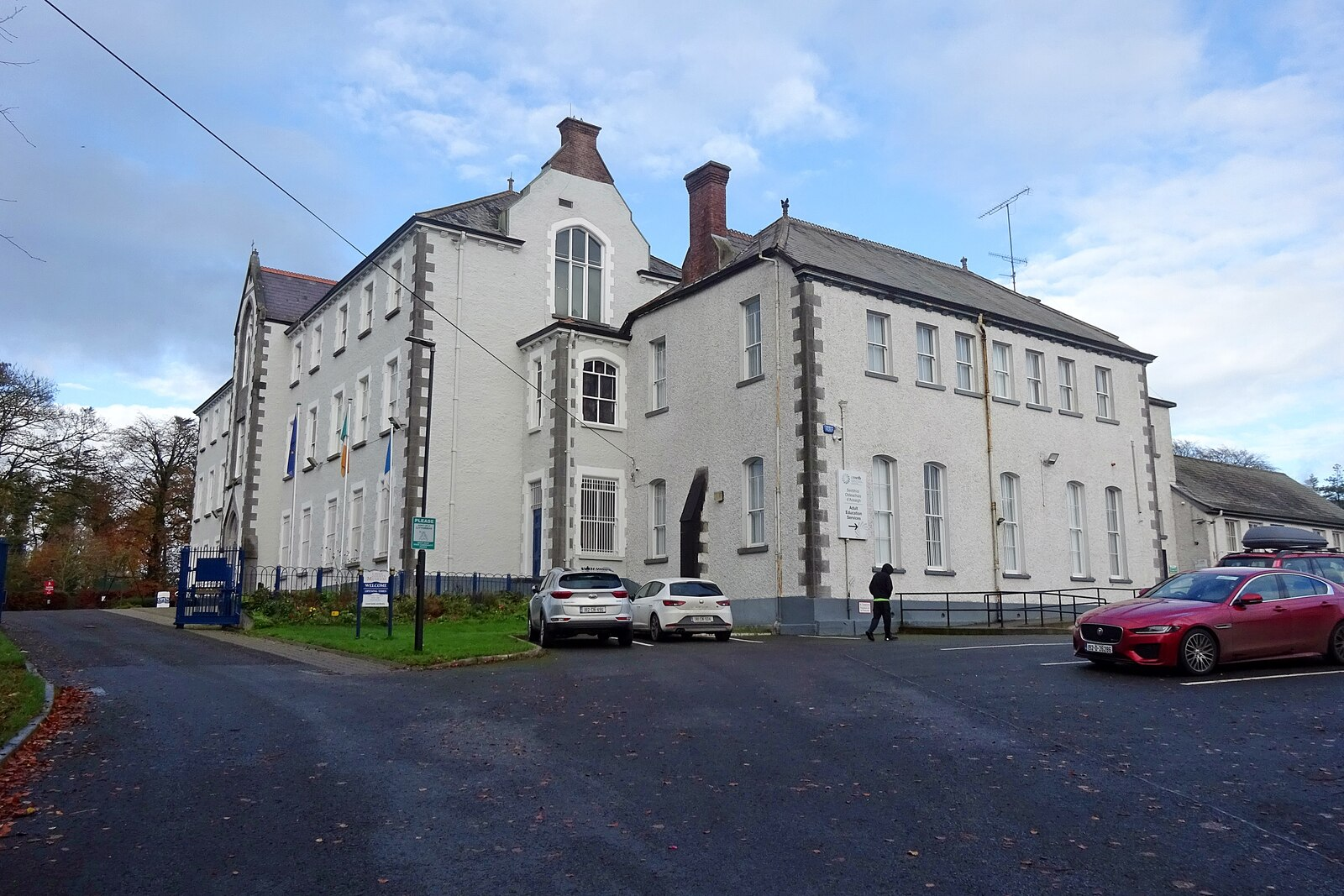

- Location within Ireland
- Established: 1996
- Location: Ballyjamesduff, County Cavan, Ireland
- Coordinates: 53.8652830°N 7.2035980°W
- Type: County museum
- Curator: Savina Donohoe
- Website: www.cavanmuseum.ie

Cavan County Museum (Irish: Músaem Chontae an Chabháin) is a museum dedicated to the history of County Cavan. The museum is housed in the former Convent of St Clare in Ballyjamesduff.

== History ==
The museum was established in 1996, and is housed in a 19th-century former convent of the Poor Clare nuns. The museum was established to collect, conserve and display the material heritage and culture of County Cavan, over its 6000-year history, for the benefit of the people.

== Contents ==
The former convent building comprises the exhibition spaces and gardens. The collections range from prehistoric to modern objects, including the Killycluggin Stone, the Lavey Sheela na gig, costumes in the Pighouse Collection, and GAA paraphernalia. Other exhibitions cover the Great Famine in the county, as well as renowned local singer, Percy French. In relation to the convent building the museum occupies, there is also an exhibition dedicated to the Poor Clares. A more recent object to be put on display is the personal revolver of local politician Arthur Griffith.

The exhibitions feature a replica World War I trench, built to the original specifications as used by the Royal Irish Fusiliers. The museum has worked in collaboration with the Fermanagh County Museum through the "Connecting People, Places and Heritage Project". The temporary gallery of the museum hosts exhibitions of local and national artists. The museum is designated by the National Museum of Ireland to collect archaeological finds.
