= Doogary =

Townland in County Cavan, Ireland

Doogary (from the Irish An Dúgharraí meaning 'the black garden' or Dúbhgaire meaning 'the black weir') is a townland in the civil parish of Kildallan, barony of Tullyhunco, County Cavan, Ireland.

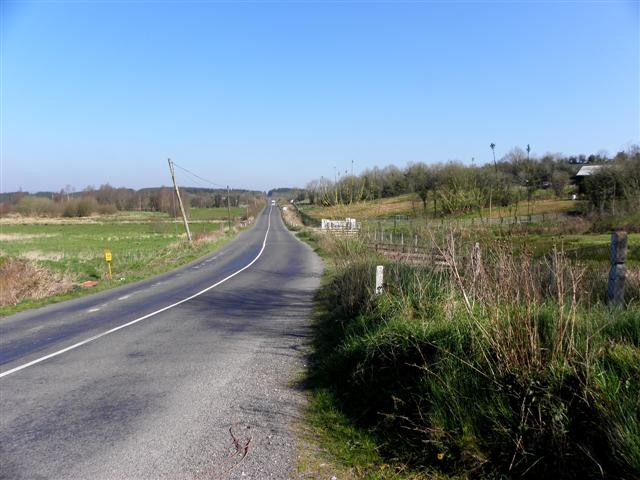
Road at Doogary (geograph 2870326)

== Geography ==
Doogary is bounded on the west by Burren (townland), on the east by Greaghacholea townland, on the south by Derrinlester, Killygorman and Raleagh townlands and on the north by Kiltynaskellan and Tullynabeherny townlands. Its chief geographical features are small streams, forestry plantations, quarries, and spring wells. Doogary is traversed by the regional R199 road (Ireland), minor public roads and rural lanes. The townland covers 316 acres.

== History ==
The Ulster Plantation Baronial map of 1609 depicts the name as Dowrie. The Ulster Plantation grants of 1611 spell the townland name as Dowry. The 1652 Commonwealth Survey spells the townland as Doory. The 1664 Hearth Money Rolls spells it as Dary. The 1665 Down Survey map depicts it as Durey. A 1668 grant spells it as Durry. William Petty's map of 1685 depicts it as Durey. The locals currently pronounce the name as Doo-Grah.

From medieval times up to the early 1600s, the land belonged to the McKiernan Clan. About the year 1600 it was owned by Thomas McKiernan, along with the townlands of Ned, Coraghmuck and Bellaheady, all in Tullyhunco Barony. Thomas died sometime before 1611 and his lands were inherited by his son Owen McKiernan. Owen was worried that his lands would be confiscated under the Plantation of Ulster so he made representations to the Lords of the Council in Whitehall, London. They, in turn, sent the following note to Arthur Chichester, 1st Baron Chichester, the Lord Deputy of Ireland- April 30, 1610. Recommend to his favourable consideration in the settlement of the natives, the bearer, Owen Carnan, who sued for 800 acres of land lying in the county of Cavan, which have belonged (as he informs them) to his father, uncle, & others his predecessors, time out of mind, without any attainder for matter of disloyalty. Owen McKiernan was only partly successful in his claim as in the Plantation of Ulster, by grant dated 4 June 1611, King James VI and I granted 100 acres or 2 poles (a poll is a local name for townland) of land in Tullyhunco at an annual rent of £1 1s. 4d., to Wony McThomas McKernan, comprising the modern-day townlands of Ned, Doogary and Coraghmuck.

After the Irish Rebellion of 1641 concluded, the townland was confiscated in the Cromwellian Settlement and the 1652 Commonwealth Survey lists it as belonging to James Thornton. A further confirming grant of part of the townland from King Charles II, dated 30 January 1668 to James Thornton included part of Durry, containing 50 acres and 25 perches. The rest of the townland was included in a grant dated 7 July 1669 from King Charles II, to John, Lord Viscount Massareene which included 102 acres in Durey contiguous to Aughwoonagh. In the Hearth Money Rolls compiled on 29 September 1663 there were two Hearth Tax payers in Dury - Cormuck O Bacachan and Owen Makernan.

The 1790 Cavan Carvaghs list spells the name as Drery.

The Tithe Applotment Books 1823-1837 list twelve tithe payers in the townland.

The Doogary Valuation Office Field books are available for 1838.

Griffith's Valuation of 1857 lists fifty-four landholders in the townland.

In the 19th century, the landlord of Doogary was Thomas Irvine.

== Census ==
Year	Population	Males	Females	Total Houses	Uninhabited
1841	153	73	80	32	4
1851	122	47	75	25	0
1861	107	45	62	25	0
1871	71	33	38	19	0
1881	87	41	46	20	0
1891	65	31	34	16	1

In the 1901 census of Ireland, there were sixteen families listed in the townland.

In the 1911 census of Ireland, there were eighteen families listed in the townland.

== Antiquities ==
1. A Holy-Well. The Dúchas Folklore collection states- In the townland of Doogarry, about half a mile from Killygorman school, there is a spring well called by the old people in the vicinity "Tobar Padraig". About fifty years ago (c.1888) crowds of people assembled at this well, on the first Sunday in August and there recited the rosary.
2. A lime-kiln
