= Burren (townland) =

Townland in the civil parish of Templeport, County Cavan, Ireland

- Townland
- Interactive map of Burren
- Country: Ireland
- County: County Cavan
- Civil Parish: Templeport

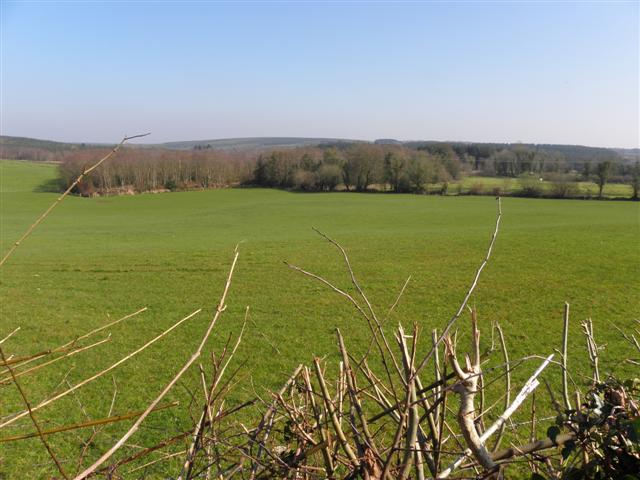
Burren Townland, Templeport, County Cavan. Looking north-east

Burren is a townland in the civil parish of Templeport, County Cavan, Ireland. It lies in the Roman Catholic parish of Templeport and barony of Tullyhaw.

== Geography ==
Burren is bounded on the north by Derrycassan and Coologe townlands, on the west by Killydrum and Derryniggan townlands in County Leitrim, on the south by Raleagh townland in Kildallan parish and Lugnagon townland in County Leitrim and on the east by Kiltynaskellan and Doogary townlands in Kildallan parish. Its chief geographical features are Derrycassan Lake, the Shannon–Erne Waterway and several stone quarries. Burren is traversed by a public road (which was made in 1913 by Father Peter Brady) and several rural lanes. The townland covers 943 statute acres.

== History ==
In medieval times the McGovern tuath of Tullyhaw was divided into economic taxation areas called ballibetoes, from the Irish Baile Biataigh (Anglicized as 'Ballybetagh'), meaning 'A Provisioner's Town or Settlement'. The original purpose was to enable the farmer, who controlled the baile, to provide hospitality for those who needed it, such as poor people and travellers. The ballybetagh was further divided into townlands farmed by individual families who paid a tribute or tax to the head of the ballybetagh, who in turn paid a similar tribute to the clan chief. The steward of the ballybetagh would have been the secular equivalent of the erenagh in charge of church lands. There were seven ballibetoes in the parish of Templeport. Burren was located in the ballybetagh of Bally Cooleigie (alias 'Bally Cowleg'). In Irish this was Baile Cúl Ó nGuaire, meaning "The Town of Guaire's Corner", or possibly Baile Cúl Ó Gabhair, meaning "The Town of the Goats' Corner".

The earliest surviving mention of the townland name is in a poem composed about 1344 A.D. in the Book of Magauran (Poem 31, verse 18), which gives the name as Boireann :

Thomas's own son (Niall Mág Samhradháin, Chief of the clan 1340–1359)

succeeded him in his castle as was the will of God the creator;

The heir he secured meant that he himself, Burren's Pillar, did not really die.

(Do sduaigh Bhoirne nocher bhás

An t-oighre do thuair Tomás).

The 1609 Ulster Plantation Baronial Map depicts the townland as Burrin. The 1652 Commonwealth Survey lists the townland as Burren. The 1665 Down Survey map depicts it as Burrin. William Petty's 1685 map depicts it as Burren.

In the Plantation of Ulster by grant dated 4 June 1611, along with other lands, King James I granted the two polls of Burrin to Donill Backagh McShane O'Reyly, Gentleman. The said Domhnall O'Reilly was the nephew of two chiefs of the O'Reilly clan- Aodh Connallach mac Maolmhordha who was chief from 1565 to 1583 and Eamonn mac Maolmhordha who was chief from 1596 to 1601. His genealogy is Domhnall Bacach son of Seaán son of Maol Mórdha (d. 1565) son of Seaán (d.1516) son of Cathal (d.1467) son of Eóghan na Fésóige (d.1449). He was also a first cousin of Cathal O'Reilly who was simultaneously granted lands in Bellaleenan townland and of Cathaoir O'Reilly who received lands in Kildoagh townland. Domhnall O'Reilly then sold Burren to Walter Talbott, the owner of Ballyconnell who then by deed dated 11 February 1614 sold the two polls of Barrin to Sir Stephen Butler of Belturbet.

In the Hearth Money Rolls compiled on 29 September 1663 there was one Hearth Tax payer in Murren- Tirlagh O'Relly.

The 1652 Commonwealth Survey lists the townland as belonging to Colonel Thomas Coote and the tenant was Philipp O'Backaghan. A further confirming grant dated 3 June 1667 from King Charles II to the aforementioned Thomas Coote, Esquire included 640 acres in Burrin at an annual rent of £8-12-9 1/2d.

The aforesaid Colonel Thomas Coote died on 25 November 1671 and his lands went to his nephew Thomas Coote (Irish politician).

On 8 Sep 1716 the said nephew Thomas Coote leased land to Edward Ellis, which included the lands of Guertenderrn alias Burren, Drumbrughliss alias Burren and Cuiliege alias Burren.

A deed dated 19 Mar 1768 by the family of the aforesaid Edward Ellis included the lands of Gurteendevin alias Burren, Drumbrughliss alias Burren and Cuiluge alias Burren.

In the Templeport Poll Book of 1761 there was only one person registered to vote in Burren in the 1761 Irish general election - George Ellis, who lived in the townland of Bellaheady in Kildallan parish but owned a freehold in Burren and so was entitled to cast two votes. The four election candidates were Charles Coote, 1st Earl of Bellomont and Lord Newtownbutler (later Brinsley Butler, 2nd Earl of Lanesborough), both of whom were then elected Member of Parliament for Cavan County. The losing candidates were George Montgomery (MP) of Ballyconnell and Barry Maxwell, 1st Earl of Farnham. Ellis voted for Coote and Montgomery. Absence from the poll book either meant a resident did not vote or more likely was not a freeholder entitled to vote, which would mean most of the inhabitants of Burren.

A deed by Gore Ellis dated 24 Feb 1776 includes the lands of Guertendeven alias Burren, Drumbrughliss alias Burren and Cuiliege alias Burren.

The 1790 Cavan Carvaghs list spells the name as Burrin.

The Tithe Applotment Books for 1827 list forty three tithepayers in the townland.

In 1833 one person in Burren was registered as a keeper of weapons- Robert Hassard. In 1836 John McFaddin of Burrin, was registered for one gun.

The Ordnance Survey Namebooks of 1836 describe the townland as- a light soil intermixed with limestone (which is burned and used for manure)...The whole of the North and part of the West side of the townland is bounded by a large lake.

The Burren Valuation Office Field books are available for 1839–1840.

Griffith's Valuation of 1857 lists thirty seven landholders in the townland.

The 1938 Dúchas folklore collection tells a fairy story set in Burren.

== Census ==
Year	Population	Males	Females	Total Houses	Uninhabited
1841	174	93	81	31	0
1851	173	79	94	29	0
1861	168	86	82	33	1
1871	155	72	83	30	0
1881	186	86	100	30	0
1891	133	67	66	27	2

In the 1901 census of Ireland, there are thirty six families listed in the townland.

In the 1911 census of Ireland, there are thirty two families listed in the townland.

== Antiquities ==
1. An earthen ringfort.
2. An earthen ringfort.
