= R205 road (Ireland) =

Road in Ireland

R205 road
- Bóthar R205
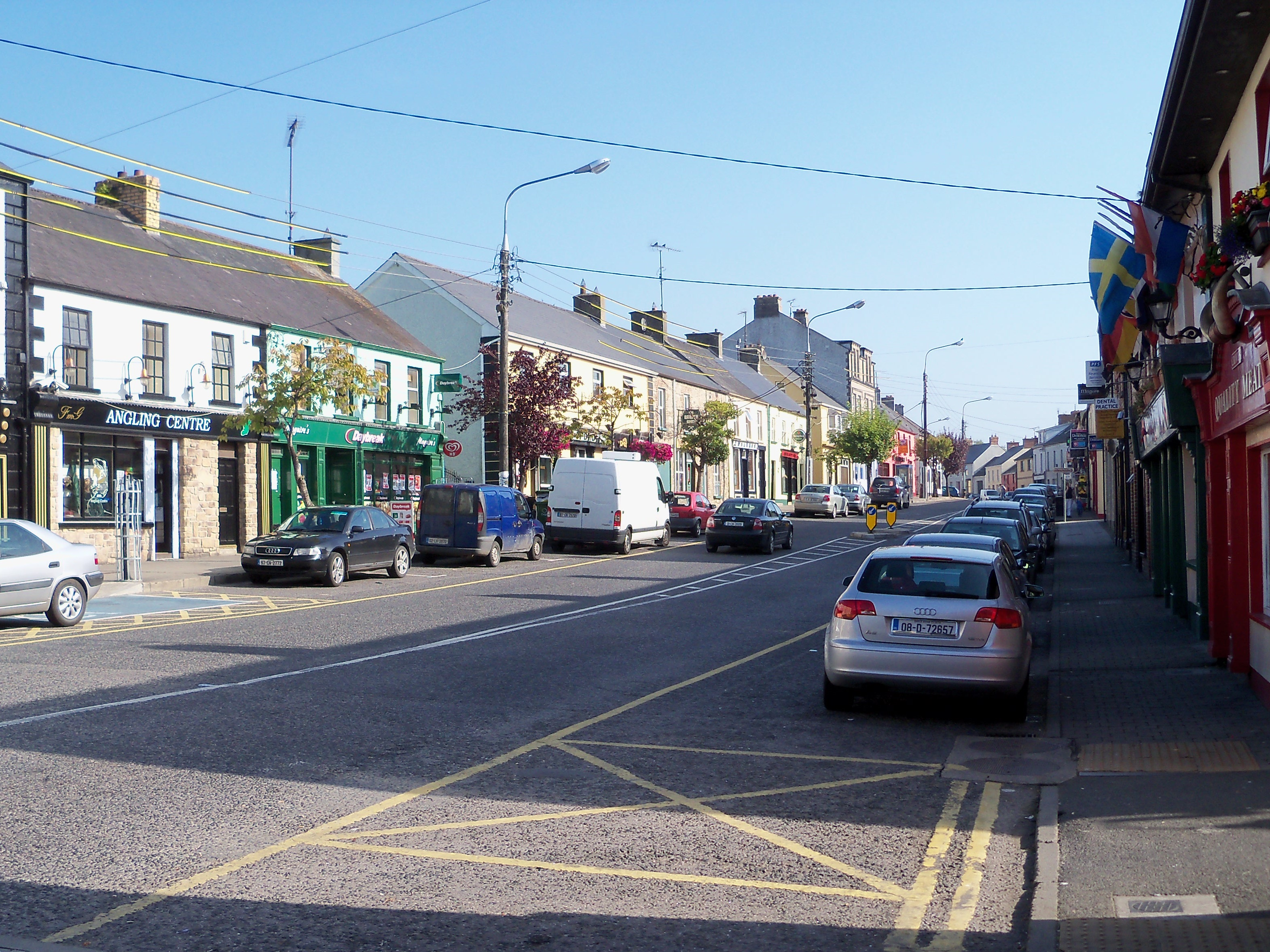
- R205 on Main Street, Ballyconnell

Route information
- Length: 13.1 km (8.1 mi)

Major junctions
- From: R199 at Kilnacreevy, County Leitrim
- Enter County Cavan; N87 in Ballyconnell
- To: County Fermanagh border at Gortawee

Location
- Country: Ireland

Highway system
- Roads in Ireland; Motorways; Primary; Secondary; Regional

The R205 road is a regional road in Ireland from the R199 road in County Leitrim to the Northern Ireland border at County Fermanagh, mostly in County Cavan. A number of factories of the former Quinn Group are located along the road.

From the R199, the road goes northeast to Ballyconnell. Leaving Ballyconnell, the road goes north to the Fermanagh border, where the road then becomes the B127. The R205 is 13.1 kilometres (8.1 mi) long.

== See also ==
- Regional road
- List of B roads in Northern Ireland
