= Gub (Glangevlin) =

Townland in County Cavan, Ireland

Gub, an Anglicisation of the Gaelic, 'Gob', meaning The Headland, is a townland in the civil parish of Templeport, County Cavan, Ireland. It lies in the Roman Catholic parish of Glangevlin and barony of Tullyhaw. It is also known as Garvalt Upper (‘Garbhalt Uachtar’, meaning The Upper Rough Gorge). It contains part of the village of Glangevlin.

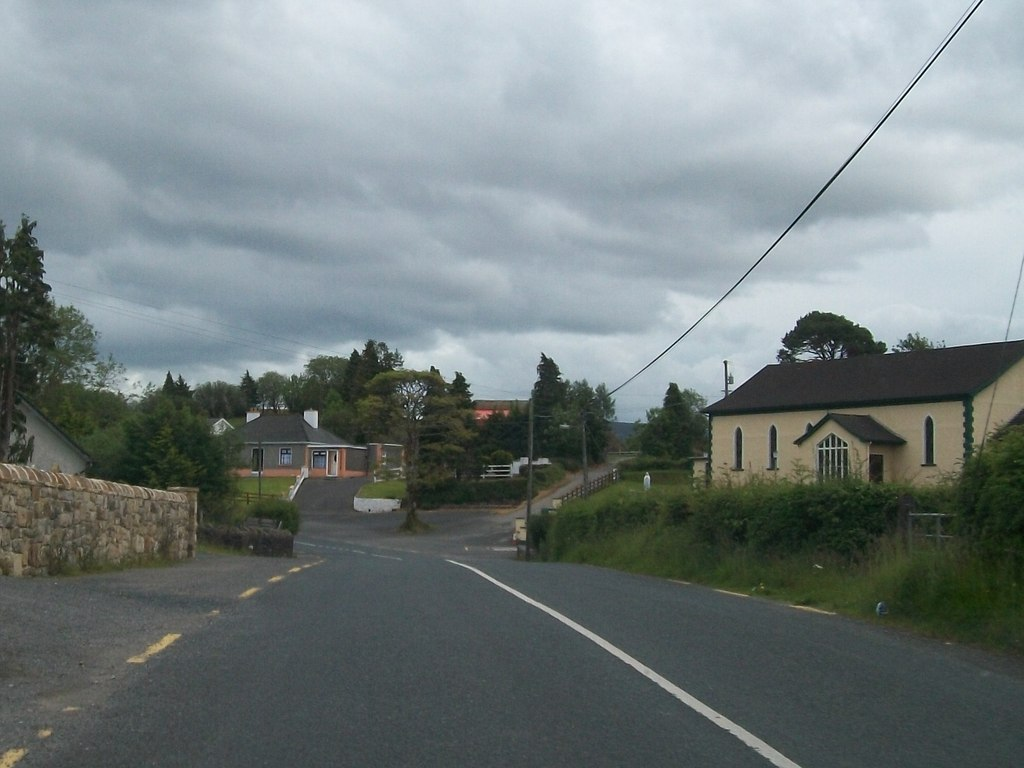
View south along the R206 at the village of Glangelvin (geograph 2702971)

== Geography ==
Gub is bounded on the north by Eshveagh and Mully Upper townlands, on the west by Garvalt Lower townland, on the south by Curraghglass and Tullynacross (Glangevlin) townlands and on the east by Ardvagh and Tullytiernan townlands. Its chief geographical features are the Owenmore River (County Cavan), mountain streams and a spring well. The townland is traversed by the regional R200 road (Ireland), the regional R206 road (Ireland), minor public roads and rural lanes. The townland covers 200 statute acres.

== History ==
The history of the townland is the same as the history of Glangevlin village.

The Tithe Applotment Books for 1827 list four tithepayers in the townland.

The Gub Valuation Office Field books are available for 1839-1840.

Griffith's Valuation of 1857 lists eighteen landholders in the townland.

There is a poem about a faction fight between the Dolans and the McGoverns at Gub and Eshveagh.

== Census ==
Year	Population	Males	Females	Total Houses	Uninhabited
1841	104	60	44	18	0
1851	99	58	41	16	0
1861	105	53	52	16	1
1871	84	45	39	14	0
1881	72	39	33	14	1
1891	68	35	33	13	1

In the 1901 census of Ireland, there are twenty-two families listed in the townland.

In the 1911 census of Ireland, there are nineteen families listed in the townland.

== Antiquities ==
1. Saint Patrick’s Roman Catholic Church, Graveyard and Parochial House. The website Glangevlin.com states- The first church was built on a hill in Garvolt. It was replaced by a thatched building erected in 1796 inside the present church gates. In the 1850s the church was very much in need of repair and much too small to accommodate the rising population of that time. From parish records we can see that over 60 baptisms and 30 marriages took place in Glangevlin in 1872. In 1856 Fr. Hugh Magauran built a new church and erected the famous bell used during evictions. The old church was used as a parochial house. In 1978 the church was in need of essential maintenance and a new tiled roof replaced the old slated one. In addition an extension and porch were added to the church structure. The old magnificent altar, adorned with the apostles, was moved forward to allow the priest to face the congregation. The original bell tower was situated alongside the church. It was re-dedicated on 6 August 1978. Recently the tower was relocated to the rear of the church.
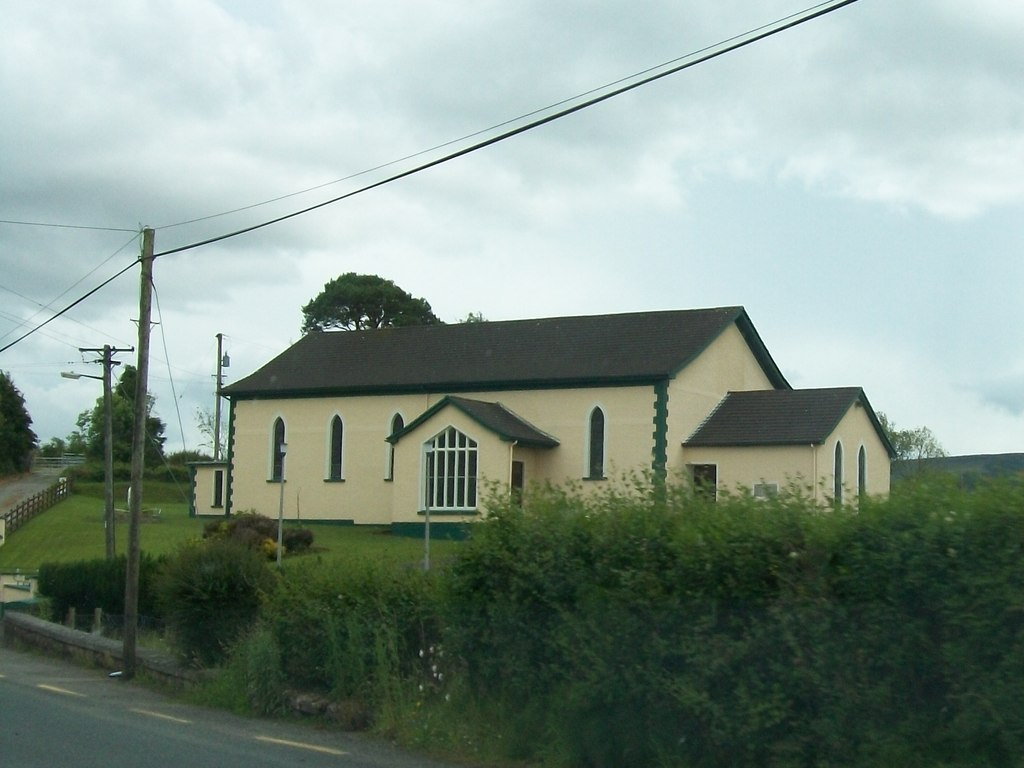
  St Patricks Roman Catholic Church, Glangelvin (geograph 2702964)
2. A stone bridge built 1870. The Buildings of Ireland website describes it as- Single-arch ashlar limestone road bridge, built c.1870, spanning Owenmore River. Abutment supporting soffit, having shallow segmental-arch with stepped elongated voussoirs. Spandrels with sneck-like levellers at voussoirs. Ashlar wing walls, extensive to west side. Equal length parapets with square chamfered coping projecting with angled surface on outer faces of bridge, vertical ends. Appraisal- ‘The ashlar bridge was built in conjunction with an extensive section of road in the latter part of nineteenth century. It has an elegant arch, the span of which is surprisingly large for a rural bridge. The bridge is expertly constructed of carefully cut ashlar and makes a significant contribution to the civil engineering heritage of the county. The Glangevlin website describes it as- This bridge spans the Abhann Mhor. It is located on the Dowra Road in the townland of Garvolt. It is a remarkable one as it is the second largest one in Ireland which has only one eye, the largest spans the Blackwater in Cork. Strangely enough both bridges are reputed to have been built by the same contractor who was supposed to be a McLoughlin from Enniskillen and his three sons. The stones with which the big bridge was built were excavated by manual labour from huge rocks found in Garvolt. The chisels were sharpened in a nearby forge, which was specially erected by the contractor for that purpose. He was so keen that when the bridge was finished there was only one stone left over, and it can be seen nearby up to the present day. After the bridge was completed and the wooden supports were taken away a loud crackling noise was heard which frightened the contractor so much that he was unfit to undertake any other building contracts. A story is told about the forge which remained long after the construction of the bridge was finished. One night a local farmer decided to use it as a byre to "house" his calves for the winter. As he was driving them in, clods were thrown from all directions and the farmer cried aloud "Let me house my calves for the winter and I will never bother you again." The clodding stopped and the farmer was granted his wish. Many foreign visitors come to fish in the Abhann Mhor and marvel at the structure of the bridge. Geologists ask many questions about it. A "turkey's claw" which is a mark left by sappers who were mapping Ireland is in view on the top of the bridge.
3. Stepping-stones over the Owenmore River
4. A foot-bridge over a stream.
5. A Fair-Green
6. A 19th century Royal Irish Constabulary barracks.
7. Glangevlin hedge-school. In the 1820s there were two hedge-schools in Glangevlin. One was held in the house of the parish priest and the teacher was Edmund Roach, a Roman Catholic. His salary was £8.10s per annum. There were 94 pupils, all Roman Catholics, of which 70 were boys and 24 were girls. The other school was held in a building of stone and lime which was valued at £12. The teacher was Thomas Moran, a Roman Catholic, whose annual salary was £8. There were 100 pupils, all Roman Catholics, of which 60 were boys and 40 were girls.
8. Garvalt National School, Roll No. 1182. The Reports from the Commissioners of National Education in Ireland give the following figures for the school. 1846: There was one male teacher who received an annual salary of £12. There were 93 pupils, 66 boys and 27 girls. 1854: There was one male teacher who received an annual salary of £15. There were 80 pupils, 54 boys and 26 girls. 1862: Bernard McGauran was the headmaster and Bridget Dolan was the workmistress, both Roman Catholics, as were all the pupils. There were 97 pupils. The Catechism was taught on Saturdays from 10am to 12 noon. 1874: There was one male teacher who received an annual salary of £29. There were 108 pupils, 52 boys and 56 girls.
