= Legnagrow =

Townland in County Cavan, Ireland

Legnagrow, an Anglicisation of the Gaelic, either Lag na gCnó 'The Hollow of the Nuts', or Lag na gCro 'The Hollow of the Huts or Sheep-Folds', is a townland in the civil parish of Templeport, County Cavan, Ireland. It lies in the Roman Catholic parish of Glangevlin and barony of Tullyhaw.

== Geography ==
Legnagrow is bounded on the west by Corneenflynn, Creea, Curraghvah and Mully Lower townlands, on the south by Mully Upper townland and on the east by Edenmore, Garvagh, Killykeeghan and Legglass townlands. Its chief geographical features are Cuilcagh mountain on whose western slope it lies with the peak of Tiltinbane (Irish: An tAltin Bán, lit. 'The White Little Gorge') reaching a height of 1949 feet, Legnagrow Lough, Owenmore River (County Cavan), mountain streams, water sink-holes, waterfalls, forestry plantations, a wood, gravel pits, a sulphurous spa well and spring wells. The townland is traversed by the regional R206 road (Ireland), minor public roads and rural lanes. The townland covers 826 statute acres.

== History ==
A deed dated 13 Nov 1738 includes: Legnagro.

The 1790 Cavan Carvaghs list spells the name as Legnagno.

The Tithe Applotment Books for 1826 list five tithepayers in the townland.

The Ordnance Survey Name Books for 1836 give the following description of the townland- "There is a corn mill and kiln".

The Legnagrow Valuation Office Field books are available for 1839-1840.

Griffith's Valuation of 1857 lists nineteen landholders in the townland.

In the 19th century Philip McGovern of Legnagrow was famous throughout Ireland for having the cure of Rabies or hydrophobia.

There is a monument to the Seanchaí John Neddy Maguire of Legnagrow.

There are folktales about Legnagrow in the 1938 Dúchas collection.

There is also a song about Michael Maguire of Legnagrow in the Dúchas collection.

A poem mentions Charraic Lag na gCró.

== Census ==
Year	Population	Males	Females	Total Houses	Uninhabited
1841	185	89	96	32	1
1851	158	74	84	26	0
1861	166	90	76	25	0
1871	101	56	45	15	0
1881	98	45	53	15	0
1891	118	61	57	17	1

In the 1901 census of Ireland, there are seventeen families listed in the townland.

In the 1911 census of Ireland, there are fifteen families listed in the townland.

== Antiquities ==
1. A sweathouse. The 'Archaeological Inventory of County Cavan' (Site no. 1874) describes it as- "Marked on all OS eds. An earlier description (Sweathouses between Blacklion and Dowra, County Cavan, by P. Richardson, in Ulster Journal of Archaeology, Third Series, Vol. 2 (1939), pp. 34–35. No. 14. Legnagrow A. OS 6, 1, 3.) noted that it had an internal diameter of c. 1.7m, a max height of c. 1.5m and that the walls were c. 0.8m thick. A large slab which formed the roof had been removed some thirty years previously. No sign of a chimney. Not visited".
2. A sweathouse. The above 1939 article describes it as- "No. 15. Legnagrow B.- OS 4, 35.4’’ east, 7.8’’ south. Internal diameter 6ft., height inside 6ft. 5 in., outside at door 9ft. Corbelled roof closed by a small slab. Doorway 2ft.4in. high by 2ft.5in. wide by 4ft.8in. deep, roofed by two large lintel-stones. Rough chimney to the left of it. External circumference 51 ft."
3. A sweathouse. The above 1939 article describes it as- "No. 16. Legnagrow C.- OS 4, 36’’ east, 9.4’’ south. Internal diameter 5ft., height inside 3ft. 6 in. Walls vertical, with one huge roofing slab. Doorway 2ft. high by 1ft.11 in. wide, closed by one lintel."
4. A medieval earthen ringfort. The 'Archaeological Inventory of County Cavan' (Site No. 855) describes it as- "Marked 'Fort' on OS 1836 ed. Raised circular area (int. diam. 32.5m) enclosed by the remains of an earthen bank and slight traces of a fosse. The south half of the site has been levelled and the perimeter is identifiable only with difficulty. Original entrance not recognisable. Remains of possible stone structure in the interior at south-east".
5. A medieval earthen enclosure. The 'Archaeological Inventory of County Cavan' (Site No. 1406) describes it as- "Raised circular area (int. diam. 8m) enclosed by a low, narrow earthen bank accompanied by an apparently modern external trench. Site is divided into two roughly equal portions by a field bank running NW-SE, the area SW of which has been levelled. Entrance feature (Wth 3m) at north. Known locally as a 'fort'".
6. Stepping-stones over the streams.
7. Lime-kilns
8. A corn-mill, corn-kiln, sluice and mill-race.
