= Corratawy =

Townland in County Cavan, Ireland

Corratawy, an Anglicisation of the Gaelic, ‘Corr an tSamhaidh’ meaning The Round Hill of the Sorrel Herb, is a townland in the civil parish of Templeport, County Cavan, Ireland. It lies in the Roman Catholic parish of Glangevlin and barony of Tullyhaw. The local pronunciation is Curratavy.

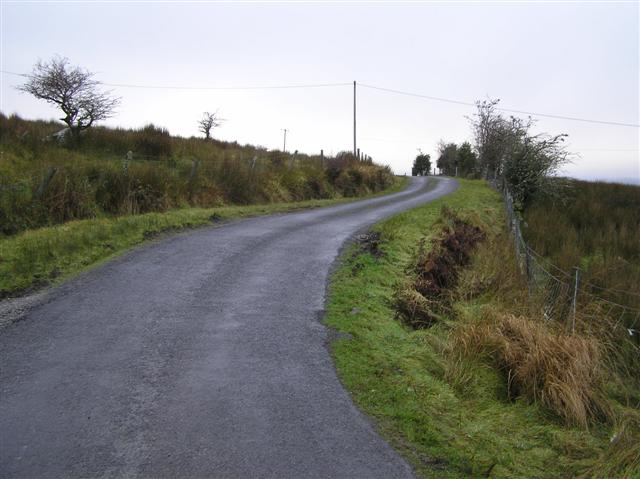
Road at Corratawy - geograph.org.uk - 1089643

== Geography ==
Corratawy is bounded on the north by Derrylahan townland, on the west by Drumhurrin and Lattone townlands and on the east by Creea and Edenmore townlands. Its chief geographical features are Carricknahurroo Lough, Drumhurrin Lough, Corratawy Lough, mountain streams, woods, dug wells and spring wells. It is near the Shannon Pot, traditional source of the River Shannon. The townland is traversed by the regional R206 road (Ireland), minor public roads and rural lanes. The townland covers 346 statute acres.

== History ==
In earlier times the townland was probably uninhabited as it consists mainly of bog and poor clay soils. It was not seized by the English during the Plantation of Ulster in 1610 or in the Cromwellian Settlement of the 1660s so some dispossessed Irish families moved there and began to clear and farm the land.

A deed dated 10 May 1744 spells the name as Currawtawny.

The 1790 Cavan Carvaghs list spells the name as Cortawy.

The Tithe Applotment Books for 1826 list four tithepayers in the townland.

The Corratawy Valuation Office Field books are available for July 1839.

Griffith's Valuation of 1857 lists seven landholders in the townland.

The landlord of Corratawy in the 19th century was William Blachford.

== Census ==
Year	Population	Males	Females	Total Houses	Uninhabited
1841	64	23	41	10	0
1851	61	29	32	8	0
1861	57	29	28	9	0
1871	58	27	31	9	0
1881	59	28	31	8	0
1891	60	31	29	8	0

In the 1901 census of Ireland, there are nine families listed in the townland.

In the 1911 census of Ireland, there are nine families listed in the townland.

== Antiquities ==
1. A sweathouse. The 'Archaeological Inventory of County Cavan' (Site no. 1865), describes it as- Marked on OS 1836 and 1876 eds. Situated 180m NE of Drumhurrin Lough. In the early decades of this century it was dismantled and the stones utilised as building material for field boundaries in the vicinity (local information). No visible remains at ground level.
2. Stone bridges over the rivers
3. Lime-kilns
4. Corratawy National School, Roll No. 13,702. The school was opened in January 1890 by the parish priest, Father Thomas Corr, as one of the replacements for closed old schools in the parish. There were 132 pupils in the school in 1890. Local folklore was collected in 1938 by the pupils of the school. The school was closed in the mid-1960s.
