= Creea =

Townland in County Cavan, Ireland

Creea, an Anglicisation of the Gaelic, either ‘Críocha’ meaning The Territory or the Boundaries, or ‘Cré’ meaning Clay, or ‘Croí’ meaning The Heart or 'Criathar' meaning a Sieve, is a townland in the civil parish of Templeport, County Cavan, Ireland. It lies in the Roman Catholic parish of Glangevlin and barony of Tullyhaw.

In Scotland, Creea is also an alternative spelling of the Gaelic, 'cridhe', meaning heart or courage, used as a given name.

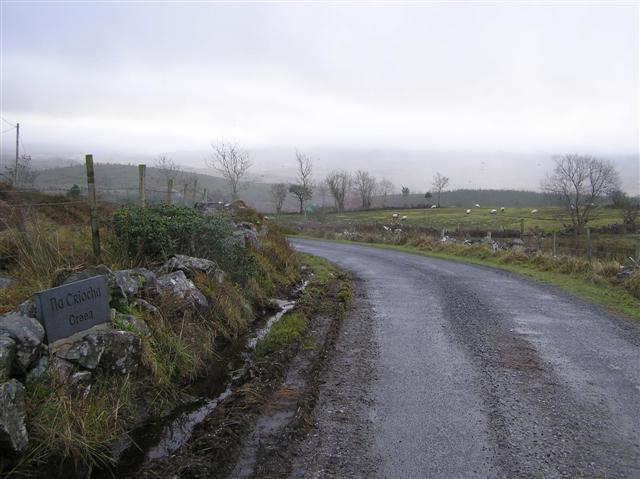
Road at Creea - geograph.org.uk - 1089655

== Geography ==
Creea is bounded on the north by Corratawy townland, on the west by Curraghvah, Drumhurrin and Legnagrow townlands and on the east by Corneenflynn and Edenmore townlands. Its chief geographical features are the Owenmore River (County Cavan), mountain streams, woods, a gravel pit and spring wells. The townland is traversed by the regional R206 road (Ireland), minor public roads and rural lanes. The townland covers 318 statute acres.

== History ==
In earlier times the townland was probably uninhabited as it consists mainly of bog and poor clay soils. It was not seized by the English during the Plantation of Ulster in 1610 or in the Cromwellian Settlement of the 1660s so some dispossessed Irish families moved there and began to clear and farm the land.

By 1720 Morley Saunders, was the owner of the townland.

By deed dated 24 December 1720 the aforesaid Morley Saunders leased the townland of Creeau, inter alia, to Thomas Enery of Bawnboy for a term of 41 years.

A deed dated 13 Nov 1738 includes: Crean.

A deed dated 30 April 1740 by Thomas Enery includes: Creagh.

A rental of the Annesley Estate dated c.1802 lists the tenant of Crea as Hugh Delacy, held under a lease for 31 years commencing on 1 May 1774.

The Tithe Applotment Books for 1826 list seven tithepayers in the townland.

The 1836 Ordnance survey Name books state- The soil is of a light gravelly nature. In the 1836 OS map a small part of the townland to the south was part of Corneenflynn townland but by the 1913 edition this small part had been merged with Creea townland. The 1836 Name Books refers to it as- This is a small arable spot containing 8 chains belonging to the townland of Cornaflin. It is in no way connected with Cornaflin being separated from it by Legnagrow and Cray.

The Creea Valuation Office Field books are available for July 1839.

Griffith's Valuation of 1857 lists twelve landholders in the townland.

The landlord of Creea in the 19th century was the Annesley Estate.

== Census ==
Year	Population	Males	Females	Total Houses	Uninhabited
1841	77	37	40	14	0
1851	61	28	33	14	1
1861	72	41	31	11	1
1871	75	40	35	10	0
1881	77	38	39	13	0
1891	70	33	37	12	0

In the 1901 census of Ireland, there are thirteen families listed in the townland.

In the 1911 census of Ireland, there are thirteen families listed in the townland.

== Antiquities ==
1. Stone bridges over the rivers
2. Lime-kilns
3. Creea National School. The Reports from the Commissioners of National Education in Ireland give the following figures for Creea School, Roll No. 3584- 1846: One male teacher who received an annual salary of £14. There were 86 pupils, 54 boys and 32 girls. 1854: One male teacher who received an annual salary of £16. There were 98 pupils, 60 boys and 38 girls. 1862: Francis Maguire was the headmaster and John Magauran was the monitor, both Roman Catholics. There were 98 pupils, all Roman Catholic. The Catechism was taught to the pupils on Saturdays from 11am to 1pm. 1874: The Roll number was changed to 10881. One male teacher who received an annual salary of £24. There were 70 pupils, 36 boys and 34 girls.
