= Drumhurrin =

Townland in County Cavan, Ireland

Drumhurrin, an Anglicisation of the Gaelic ‘Droim Shoirn’, meaning The Hill-Ridge of the Lime-Kiln or Furnace, is a townland in the civil parish of Templeport, County Cavan, Ireland. It lies in the Roman Catholic parish of Glangevlin and barony of Tullyhaw.

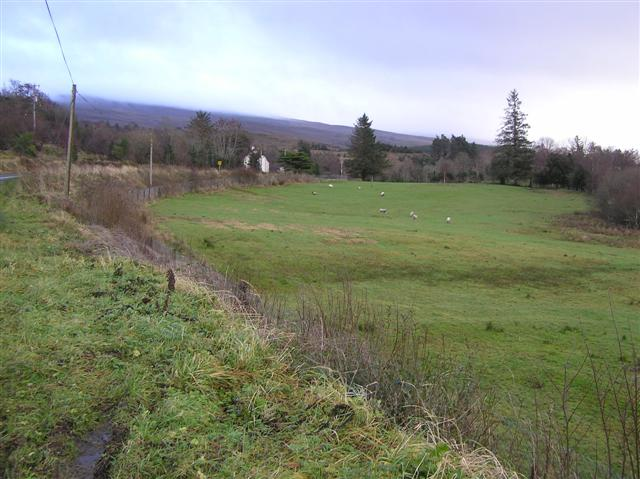
Drumhurrin Townland - geograph.org.uk - 1089741

== Geography ==
Drumhurrin is bounded on the north by Lattone townland, on the west by Derrynatuan, Gowlat and Tullantanty townlands and on the east by Corratawy, Creea and Curraghvah townlands. Its chief geographical features are Drumhurrin Lough, the River Shannon, the Owenmore River (County Cavan), mountain streams, a wood, gravel pits and dug wells. The townland is traversed by the regional R206 road (Ireland), minor public roads and rural lanes. The townland covers 372 statute acres.

== History ==
The 1652 Commonwealth Survey spells the name as Dromherne and gives the owner as Lieutenant John Blackford and others.

By 1720, Morley Saunders was the owner of the townland.

By deed dated 24 December 1720 the aforesaid Morley Saunders leased, inter alia, the townland of Drumhurn, to Thomas Enery of Bawnboy for a term of 41 years.

Deeds dated 13 Nov 1738 and 30 April 1740 both list the name of the hill as Drumhurn, and the later deed lists it as being owned by Thomas Enery. By the 1790 Cavan Carvaghs list, however, the spelling of the name had shifted to Drumhurin.

The Tithe Applotment Books for 1826 list five tithepayers in the townland.

The Ordnance Survey Name Books for 1836 give the following description of the townland- Two small lakes on the north boundary of the townland. It is bounded on the west by the Shannon and on the south by another river.

The Drumhurrin Valuation Office Field books are available for July 1839.

Griffith's Valuation of 1857 lists nineteen landholders in the townland.

In the 19th century the landlord of Drumhurrin was the Annesley Estate.

== Census ==
Year	Population	Males	Females	Total Houses	Uninhabited
1841	152	77	75	22	0
1851	152	83	69	21	0
1861	146	78	68	21	1
1871	120	61	59	19	0
1881	99	50	49	17	0
1891	92	44	48	19	1

In the 1901 census of Ireland, there are twenty-two families listed in the townland.

In the 1911 census of Ireland, there are eighteen families listed in the townland.

== Antiquities ==
1. A medieval ringfort stone cashel. The 'Archaeological Inventory of County Cavan' (Site No. 1192) describes it as- Not marked on OS 1836 or 1876 ed. Raised circular area (int. diam. 31.7m) enclosed by the base of a stone rampart. The upper courses of the wall have been removed and the stone apparently utilised as building material for field boundaries in the vicinity. Original entrance not recognisable.
2. Drumhurrin National School. The roll number was 8305. In 1862 Edward Brady was the headmaster, a Roman Catholic. There were 77 pupils, all Roman Catholic. The Catechism was taught to the Catholic pupils on Saturdays from 10am to 1pm. In 1874: One male teacher and one female workmistress, both Roman Catholics, who between them received an annual salary of £38. There were 89 pupils, 43 boys and 46 girls. In 1886 the school closed.
3. A 19th century blacksmith's forge.
4. Stone bridges over the rivers.
5. Stepping-stones over the Owenmore river.
6. A foot-bridge over the Owenmore river.
7. Lime-kilns.
