= Mully Upper =

Townland in County Cavan, Ireland

Mully Upper, an Anglicisation of the Gaelic, ‘Mullach Uachtar’ meaning The Upper Summit of the Hill, is a townland in the civil parish of Templeport, County Cavan, Ireland. It lies in the Roman Catholic parish of Glangevlin and barony of Tullyhaw.

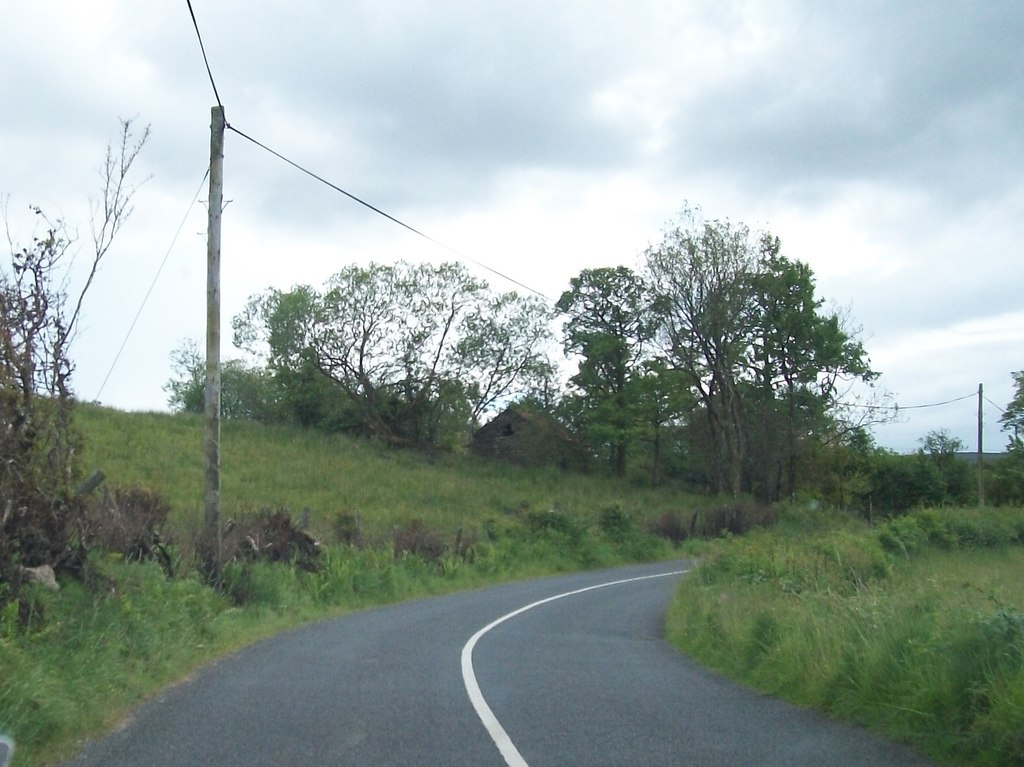
Old farm building above the R206 in the Townland of Mully Upper (geograph 2704178)

== Geography ==
Mully Upper is bounded on the north by Legnagrow townland, on the west by Garvalt Lower, Gub (Glangevlin) and Mully Lower townlands and on the east by Eshveagh and Legglass townlands. Its chief geographical features are Eshveagh Lough, the Owenmore River (County Cavan), mountain streams, waterfalls and spring wells. The townland is traversed by the regional R206 road (Ireland), minor public roads and rural lanes. The townland covers 154 statute acres.

== History ==
The Tithe Applotment Books for 1826 list five tithepayers in the townland.

The Mully Upper Valuation Office Field books are available for July 1839.

Griffith's Valuation of 1857 lists thirteen landholders in the townland.

In the 19th century the landlord of Mully Upper was the Hassard Estate. In 1875 the Hassard Estate sold the townland to James Bracken.

== Census ==
Year	Population	Males	Females	Total Houses	Uninhabited
1841	41	22	19	6	0
1851	42	26	19	6	0
1861	48	26	22	9	0
1871	26	12	14	4	0
1881	29	16	13	7	0
1891	29	15	14	7	0

In the 1901 census of Ireland, there are nine families listed in the townland.

In the 1911 census of Ireland, there are eleven families listed in the townland.

== Antiquities ==
1. Stepping-stones across the streams.
