= Tullynacross (Glangevlin) =

Townland in County Cavan, Ireland

Tullynacross, an Anglicisation of the Gaelic, ‘Tulaigh na Croise’ meaning The Hill of the Cross, is a townland in the civil parish of Templeport, County Cavan, Ireland. It lies in the Roman Catholic parish of Glangevlin and barony of Tullyhaw.

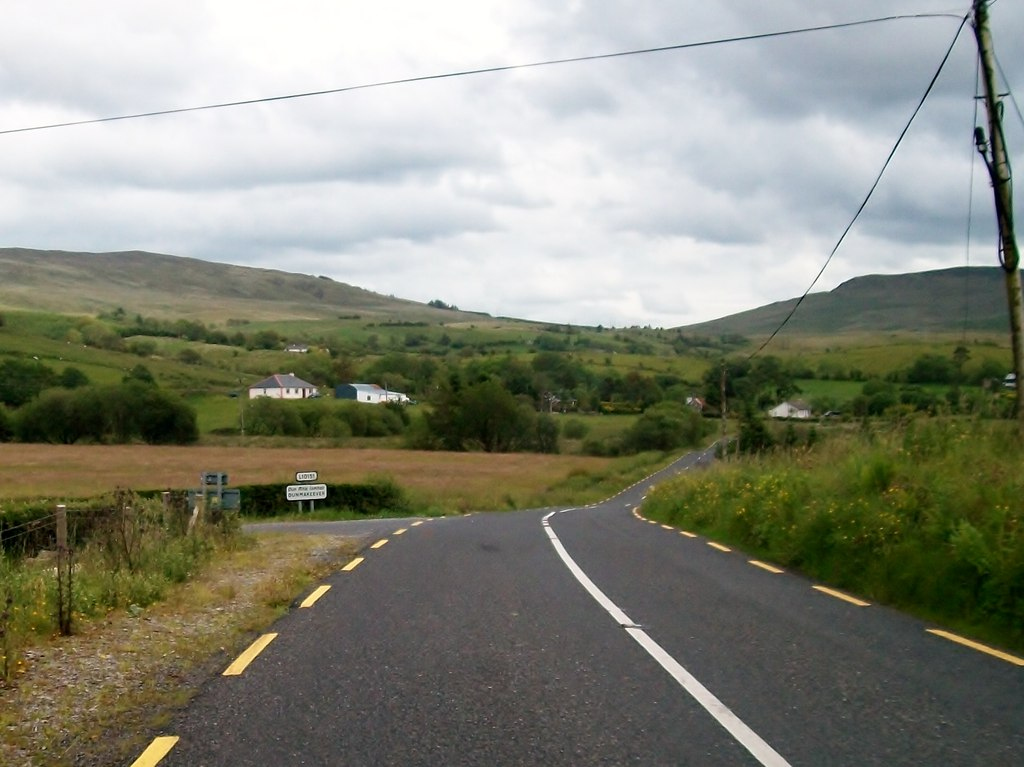
Minor road junction on the R200 at Tullynacross (geograph 2703964)

== Geography ==
Tullynacross is bounded on the north by Ardvagh townland, on the west by Curraghglass and Gub (Glangevlin) townlands, on the south by Moneensauran townland and on the east by Corracleigh, Derrynananta Lower and Dunmakeever townlands. Its chief geographical features are Tullynacross Hill which reaches a height of 567 feet, Dunmakeever Lough, Owenmore River (County Cavan), mountain streams, gravel pits and spring wells. The townland is traversed by the regional R200 road (Ireland), minor public roads and rural lanes. The townland covers 182 statute acres.

== History ==
In earlier times the townland was probably uninhabited as it consists mainly of bog and poor clay soils. It was not seized by the English during the Plantation of Ulster in 1610 or in the Cromwellian Settlement of the 1660s so some dispossessed Irish families moved there and began to clear and farm the land.

The 1790 Cavan Carvaghs list spells the name as Tullynegross.

The Tithe Applotment Books for 1826 list eleven tithepayers in the townland.

The 1836 Ordnance survey Name books state- There is an ancient fort near the north side and a small lake on the north boundary. It is bounded by a large stream or river on the west and south sides.

The Tullynacross Valuation Office Field books are available for August 1839.

Griffith's Valuation of 1857 lists nine landholders in the townland.

The landlord of Tullynacross in the 19th century was Leonard Dobbin.

== Census ==
Year	Population	Males	Females	Total Houses	Uninhabited
1841	62	35	27	9	0
1851	60	30	30	9	0
1861	54	23	31	9	0
1871	53	26	27	9	0
1881	48	20	28	8	0
1891	42	19	23	8	0

In the 1901 census of Ireland, there are eleven families listed in the townland.

In the 1911 census of Ireland, there are ten families listed in the townland.

== Antiquities ==
1. A medieval earthen ringfort. The ‘Archaeological Survey of County Cavan’ (Site no. 1155) describes it as- Raised circular area (int. diam. 21.9m) enclosed by a well-defined, low but steep-sided bank, and a fosse which is largely infilled. Original entrance not recognisable.
2. Stone bridges over the river.
