= Curraghvah =

Townland in County Cavan, Ireland

Curraghvah, an Anglicisation of the Gaelic, either ‘Currach Bheathach’, meaning The Moor of the Birches, or ‘Currach a’ Mhagh’, meaning The Moor of the Plain, or ‘Currach Mheádh’ meaning The Moor of the Spicy Mead Drink, is a townland in the civil parish of Templeport, County Cavan, Ireland. It lies in the Roman Catholic parish of Glangevlin and barony of Tullyhaw.

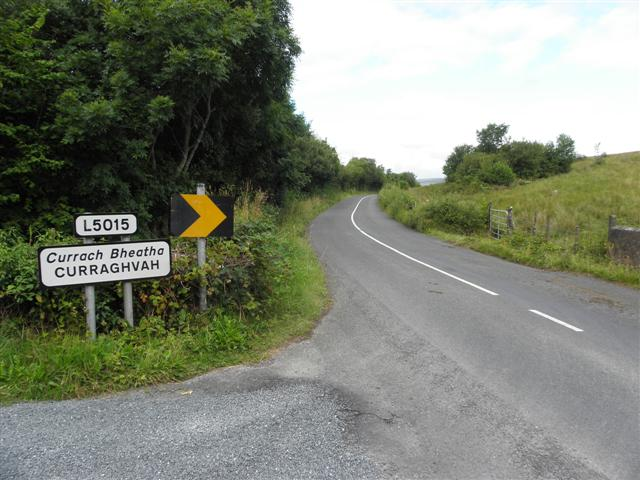
R206 Road, Curraghvah (geograph 3585912)

== Geography ==
Curraghvah is bounded on the north by Creea and Drumhurrin townlands, on the west by Coppanaghbane and Gowlat townlands, on the east by Legnagrow, Moneenabrone and Mully Lower townlands and on the south by Coppanaghmore townland. Its chief geographical features are the Owenmore River (County Cavan), mountain streams, waterfalls, a wood, gravel pits, a dug well and spring wells. The townland is traversed by the regional R200 road (Ireland), minor public roads and rural lanes. The townland covers 398 statute acres.

== History ==
In earlier times the townland was probably uninhabited as it consists mainly of bog and poor clay soils. It was not seized by the English during the Plantation of Ulster in 1610 or in the Cromwellian Settlement of the 1660s so some dispossessed Irish families moved there and began to clear and farm the land.

By 1720 Morley Saunders, was the owner of the townland.

By deed dated 28 July 1720 the aforesaid Morley Saunders leased the townland of Carravae, whose tenant was Brian Dolan, to Richard Hassard for a term of 31 years. A deed dated 13 November 1738 includes: Carrova. The 1790 Cavan Carvaghs list spells the name as Corvagh. The Tithe Applotment Books for 1826 list seven tithepayers in the townland.

The Ordnance Survey Name Books for 1836 give the following description of the townland- The soil is of a light gravelly nature and yields middling crops...There is an ancient fort near the north side and several middling good stone houses but there is nothing remarkable whatever.

The Curraghvah Valuation Office Field books are available for July 1839.

Griffith's Valuation of 1857 lists thirty-four landholders in the townland.

In the 19th century, the landlord of Curraghvah was the Annesley Estate.

== Census ==
Year	Population	Males	Females	Total Houses	Uninhabited
1841	164	80	84	25	1
1851	143	67	76	23	0
1861	140	67	73	23	0
1871	98	51	47	15	0
1881	100	55	45	16	0
1891	95	52	43	16	0

In the 1901 census of Ireland, there are twenty-one families listed in the townland.

In the 1911 census of Ireland, there are twenty-two families listed in the townland.

== Antiquities ==
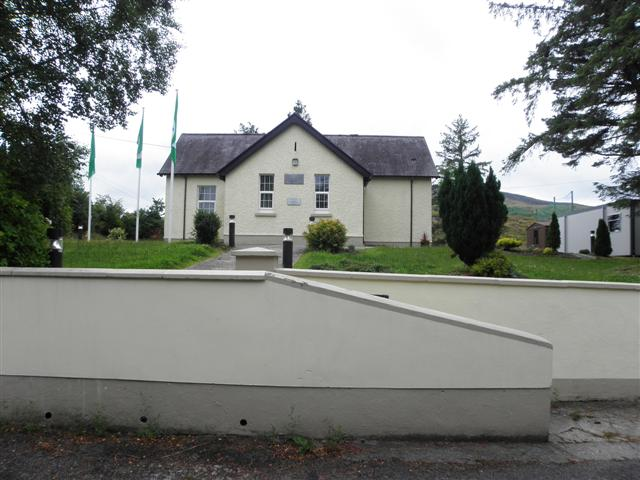
Curraghvah National School, Glangevlin, County Cavan, Ireland.

1. A medieval earthen ringfort. The 'Archaeological Inventory of County Cavan' (Site no. 493) describes it as- Raised circular area (int. dims. 26.2 NE-SW; 23.3m NW-SE) enclosed by two earthen banks with a wide, deep, waterlogged intermediate fosse. Although the NW half of the site has been largely levelled, the outline of the perimeter is still identifiable. Original entrance not recognisable. Short stretch of relatively recent drystone walling on internal face of inner bank at E. A small stone-lined subcircular depression at the centre of the interior is believed to be a spring well (OPW 1977). Situated on the floor of an upland valley.
2. Curraghvah National School. In 1933 the school was opened with the intention of replacing a 19th century school in Carrick West townland, which was closed. In 1938 the pupils of the school recorded local folklore. In 1979 Tullycasson school was amalgamated with Curravagh N.S., leaving Curravagh as the sole remaining school in the area.
3. A stone bridge over the river.
4. A lime-kiln
5. Stepping stones over the river
6. A foot-stick over the river.
