= Bellavally Lower =

Townland in County Cavan, Ireland

Bellavally Lower (Gaelic 'Béal an Bhealaigh Íochtarach', meaning The Lower Entrance to the Pass or Gap), is a townland in the civil parish of Templeport, County Cavan, Ireland. The local pronunciation is Bealbally. It lies in the Roman Catholic parish of Glangevlin and barony of Tullyhaw.

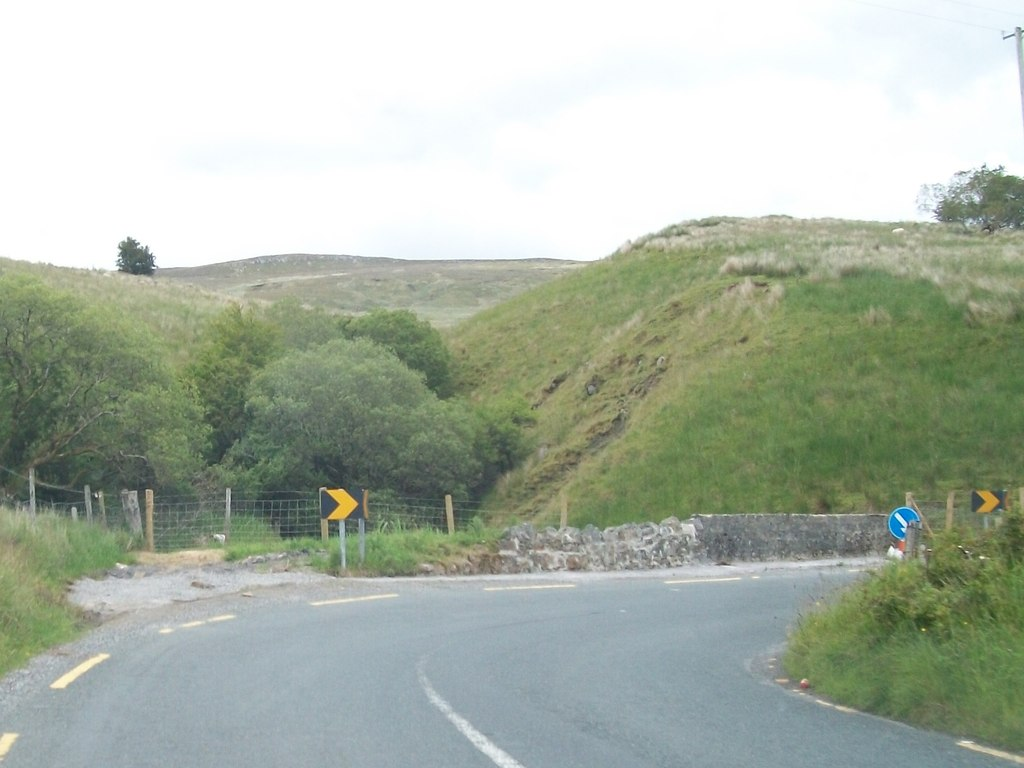
Bridge across a deep gully on the R200 at Bellavally Lower (geograph 2703001)

== Geography ==
Bellavally Lower is bounded on the north by Bursan townland, on the west by Corracleigh, Derrynananta Lower and Tullyminister townlands, on the east by Commas (Kinawley) townland and on the south by Bellavally Upper townland. Its chief geographical features are Cuilcagh mountain (on whose western slope it lies), the Owenmore River (County Cavan), mountain streams, waterfalls, swallow-holes, forestry plantations and spring wells. Bellavally Lower is traversed by the regional R200 road (Ireland), minor public roads and rural lanes. The townland is popular with mountain hikers and is also noted for geological formations such as the Dinantian (Asbian) Glenade Sandstone Formation and the Bellavally Formation. The townland covers 1,021 statute acres.

== History ==
The earliest surviving mention of the name relates to the Battle of Magh Slecht in 1256 which took place in Bellavally between the O’Reilly and O’Rourke clans. The Annals of Connacht for that year state- The main army came up with them after some of their men had been killed: Diarmait O Flannacain, Mac Maenaig, Coiclid O Coiclid and a number of others; and the combined armies came to Alt na hElti and Doirin Cranncha, between Ath na Betige and Bel in Belaig and Coill Esa and Coill Airthir, on Slieve Anierin.

In 1339 the chief of the McGovern clan, Tomás Mág Samhradháin (died 1340), was released from captivity. Poem XXII in The Book of Magauran by the poet Maol Pádraig Mac Naimhin (or Cnáimhín) commemorates his release and refers to Bellavally. Stanza 15 states- Gabháil Méig Shamhradhán sheing do líon d'urchradhaibh Éirinn, bheith i láimh do bharr Bhealaigh tall a ngráin do Ghaoidhealaibh, (Graceful McGovern’s capture, the imprisonment of Bealach’s chief and some Gael being held in horror- these things fill Ireland with woe).

The 1652 Commonwealth Survey spells the name as Bealbaly and lists the proprietor as 'The Lord of Cavan' (i.e. Charles Lambart, 1st Earl of Cavan).

A deed dated 10 May 1744 spells the name as Bealbally.

The Tithe Applotment Books for 1826 list sixteen tithepayers in the townland but this would probably include both Bellavally Upper and Lower townlands.

The Ordnance Survey Name Books for 1836 give the following description of the townland- It is bounded on the south side by a large mountain stream which is joined by a great many minor ones from the north and south sides in its course towards the north-west. Iron ore, sandstone and slate can be procured but it is not quarried. This is the name of the narrow entrance into Glen-Gaibhlin on the east, signifying the mouth of the pass or road. Tradition says that Sliabh an iarainn and Cailceach were formerly joined together until the Glas-Gaiblin, that celebrated cow of Ireland, as she was deserting the Glen, which derived its name from her brake or pass between both, with her large udder which is since called Bellawally.

In his A Topographical Dictionary of Ireland published in 1837, Samuel Lewis (publisher) states- To the west of Swanlinbar rises the Bealbally mountains, through which is the Gap of Beal, the only entrance to Glangavlin.

A local folktale occurred about 1838 in Bellavally.

The Bellavally Lower Valuation Office Field books are available for August 1839.

Griffith's Valuation of 1857 lists forty-one landholders in the townland.

In the 19th century the landlords of Bellavally were the Annesley and Blachford Estates.

== Census ==
Year	Population	Males	Females	Total Houses	Uninhabited
1841	139	58	81	21	0
1851	120	57	63	20	0
1861	90	47	43	15	1
1871	96	54	42	14	0
1881	103	50	53	15	0
1891	108	54	54	17	0

In the 1901 census of Ireland, there are twenty-two families listed in the townland.

In the 1911 census of Ireland, there are twenty-five families listed in the townland.

== Antiquities ==
1. Stone bridges, stepping-stones and footbridges over the Owenmore River.
2. Lime-kilns.
