= Garvalt Lower =

Townland in County Cavan, Ireland

Garvalt Lower, an Anglicisation of the Gaelic, ‘Garbhalt Íochtar’, meaning The Lower Rough Gorge, is a townland in the civil parish of Templeport, County Cavan, Ireland. It lies in the Roman Catholic parish of Glangevlin and barony of Tullyhaw.

== Geography ==
Garvalt Lower is bounded on the north by Mully Lower townland, on the west by Carnmaclean and Moneenabrone townlands, on the south by Tullynacleigh townland and on the east by Carrick West, Curraghglass, Gub (Glangevlin) and Mully Upper townlands. Its chief geographical features are the Owenmore River (County Cavan), mountain streams, forestry plantations, a waterfall and spring wells. The townland is traversed by the regional R200 road (Ireland), minor public roads and rural lanes. The townland covers 239 statute acres.

== History ==
The 1652 Commonwealth Survey spells the name as Gallevolty and gives the owners as Mr. Henry Pigott and others.

By 1720 Morley Saunders, was the owner of the townland.

By deed dated 24 December 1720 the aforesaid Morley Saunders leased, inter alia, the townland of Garvalt, to Thomas Enery of Bawnboy for a term of 41 years.

A deed dated 13 Nov 1738 includes: Garvotts.

A deed dated 30 April 1740 by Thomas Enery includes: Garvalts.

The 1790 Cavan Carvaghs list spells the name as Garveal.

The Tithe Applotment Books for 1826 list nine tithepayers in the townland.

The Ordnance Survey Name Books for 1836 give the following description of the townland- The soil is of a light blue gravelly nature...Lime can be procured in the bed of the river: it is used for manure by the tenants.

The Garvalt Lower Valuation Office Field books are available for August 1839.

Griffith's Valuation of 1857 lists six landholders in the townland.

In the 19th century the landlord of Garvalt Lower was the Annesley Estate.

== Census ==
Year	Population	Males	Females	Total Houses	Uninhabited
1841	72	41	31	11	0
1851	61	32	29	9	0
1861	41	21	20	7	1
1871	32	17	15	6	0
1881	35	16	19	7	1
1891	21	11	10	5	0

In the 1901 census of Ireland, there are eight families listed in the townland.

In the 1911 census of Ireland, there are six families listed in the townland.

== Antiquities ==
1. A medieval earthen ringfort. The 'Archaeological Inventory of County Cavan' (Site No. 719) describes it as- Raised circular area (int. diam. 22.9m) enclosed by a slight earthen bank and the remains of a fosse. Original entrance not recognisable. Situated in rough mountainous terrain close to the summit of a low hill.
2. A medieval stone enclosure. The 'Archaeological Inventory of County Cavan' (Site No. 1371) describes it as- Not marked on OS 1836 or 1876 ed. Situated 25m SW of a stream. A subtriangular-shaped area (int. dims. 12.9m NE-SW; 11.3m NW-SE) enclosed by a dry stone wall (Wth 0.6m; H. 0.8m) with a breach at NW possibly representing original entrance. The interior contains a number of features including a low circular cairn of stones, a stone wall (L. 5.3m) aligned NE-SW and the remains of a small rectangular unroofed stone building (int. dims. 4m NE-SW; 3.3m NW-SE) with an entrance in its NW wall.
3. A medieval stone cashel ringfort. The 'Archaeological Inventory of County Cavan' (Site No. 1372) describes it as- Tradition of large stone 'fort' at the summit of a hill (local information). Situated within a dense modern plantation of coniferous trees. Not located.
4. A medieval stone cashel ringfort. The 'Archaeological Inventory of County Cavan' (Site No. 1194) describes it as- Raised circular area (int. diam. 21.9m) enclosed by a largely collapsed drystone wall. Original entrance not recognisable. Situated in rough mountainous terrain close to the summit of a low hill.
5. A stone bridge built 1870. The Buildings of Ireland website describes it as- Single-arch ashlar limestone road bridge, built c.1870, spanning Owenmore River. Abutment supporting soffit, having shallow segmental-arch with stepped elongated voussoirs. Spandrels with sneck-like levellers at voussoirs. Ashlar wing walls, extensive to west side. Equal length parapets with square chamfered coping projecting with angled surface on outer faces of bridge, vertical ends. Appraisal- ‘The ashlar bridge was built in conjunction with an extensive section of road in the latter part of nineteenth century. It has an elegant arch, the span of which is surprisingly large for a rural bridge. The bridge is expertly constructed of carefully cut ashlar and makes a significant contribution to the civil engineering heritage of the county. The Glangevlin website describes it as- This bridge spans the Abhann Mhor. It is located on the Dowra Road in the townland of Garvolt. It is a remarkable one as it is the second largest one in Ireland which has only one eye, the largest spans the Blackwater in Cork. Strangely enough both bridges are reputed to have been built by the same contractor who was supposed to be a McLoughlin from Enniskillen and his three sons. The stones with which the big bridge was built were excavated by manual labour from huge rocks found in Garvolt. The chisels were sharpened in a nearby forge, which was specially erected by the contractor for that purpose. He was so keen that when the bridge was finished there was only one stone left over, and it can be seen nearby up to the present day. After the bridge was completed and the wooden supports were taken away a loud crackling noise was heard which frightened the contractor so much that he was unfit to undertake any other building contracts. A story is told about the forge which remained long after the construction of the bridge was finished. One night a local farmer decided to use it as a byre to "house" his calves for the winter. As he was driving them in, clods were thrown from all directions and the farmer cried aloud "Let me house my calves for the winter and I will never bother you again." The clodding stopped and the farmer was granted his wish. Many foreign visitors come to fish in the Abhann Mhor and marvel at the structure of the bridge. Geologists ask many questions about it. A "turkey's claw" which is a mark left by sappers who were mapping Ireland is in view on the top of the bridge.
6. Stepping-stones over the streams.
