= Corracleigh =

Townland in County Cavan, Ireland

Coordinates: 54°11′N 7°52′W

Corracleigh, an Anglicisation of the Gaelic, ‘Corr na Cloiche’ meaning The Round Hill of the Stone, is a townland in the civil parish of Templeport, County Cavan, Ireland. It lies in the Roman Catholic parish of Glangevlin and barony of Tullyhaw. The local pronunciation is Curracliff.

== Geography ==
Corracleigh is bounded on the west by Derrynananta Lower, Dunmakeever, Tonanilt and Tullynacross (Glangevlin) townlands and on the east by Bellavally Lower and Tullyminister townlands. Its chief geographical features are the Owenmore River (County Cavan), mountain streams, a waterfall, a forestry plantation and the stone which the townland is named after, marked on the OS maps as Corracleigh. The townland is traversed by the regional R200 road (Ireland), minor public roads and rural lanes. The townland covers 128 statute acres.

== History ==
In earlier times the townland was probably uninhabited as it consists mainly of bog and poor clay soils. It was not seized by the English during the Plantation of Ulster in 1610 or in the Cromwellian Settlement of the 1660s so some dispossessed Irish families moved there and began to clear and farm the land.

The 1790 Cavan Carvaghs list spells the townland name as Corclagh.

The Tithe Applotment Books for 1826 list three tithepayers in the townland.

The Ordnance Survey Name Books for 1836 give the following description of the townland- There is a very large stone on the south side of the road from Bawnboy to Glan called Curracliff from whence the townland derived its name. It is bounded on the north and south sides by two large streams which unite at the western extremity of the townland.

The Corracleigh Valuation Office Field books are available for August 1839.

Griffith's Valuation of 1857 lists six landholders in the townland.

The landlord of Corracleigh in the 19th century was William Blachford.

== Census ==
Year	Population	Males	Females	Total Houses	Uninhabited
1841	25	13	12	3	0
1851	28	14	14	4	0
1861	24	11	13	6	0
1871	29	12	17	4	0
1881	34	12	22	5	1
1891	17	8	9	4	1

In the 1901 census of Ireland, there are five families listed in the townland.

In the 1911 census of Ireland, there are five families listed in the townland.

== Antiquities ==
1. Carty’s Bridge over the Owenmore river, built c. 1800. The Buildings of Ireland website describes it as- Single-arch stone road bridge, built c.1800, spanning Owenmore River. Segmental arch resting on squared ashlar abutments with squared rubble-stone soffit. Arch ring of regular ashlar voussoirs, with rubble-stone spandrels. Rubble-stone parallel wing walls and parapets of even length. Low parapets with Scotch coping. Appraisal- An elegant single arch bridge of robust construction, that is an excellent example of early nineteenth century civil engineering. The road network was considerably expanded in the late eighteenth and early nineteenth century, and this bridge is a reminder of the materials, technology, and skills that were used for engineering projects at the time. According to the website www.glangevlin.com- it derives its name from a widow woman, Nellie Carthy, who had two sons. She owned a sheebeen and sold "poteen". She was reported to the revenue authorities in Enniskillen. The officers arrived on a Church Holiday. The congregation left the church before Mass was ended and sent word to Nellie that the officers were on the way. The people ran to her rescue and succeeded in hiding some of the "home brew". Some people got across the river Tamhnaigh while others followed pursued by the officers who were challenged and shots were fired. Two men, Doyle and McGovern were killed. Two large upright stones mark the spots where the men fell in the field, bordering the present Doonmakeever road and adjacent to the old Glan road. The Dúchas website states- In the townland of Doonmakiever in the parish of Glangevlin, Co. Cavan on the first road (now old and disused) there are two upright stones close to each other. These mark the place where two men fell when they were shot down by what was then called revenue officers. This shooting took place on Christmas day over a century ago. There was a Sheeven close to Cartys bridge in which a man named Carty illegally sold drink. A local man in the pay of the Government reported Carty, and on Christmas day in that year the aforesaid officer came. They people were coming from Mass, and a crowd followed the revenue officers, and were pressing close on them; they suddenly turned round and fired on the mob and two men fell mortally wounded on the spot where the stones now stand.
