= Dunmakeever =

Townland in County Cavan, Ireland

Dunmakeever is a townland in the Civil Parish of Kinawley, Roman Catholic Parish of Glangevlin, Barony of Tullyhaw, County Cavan, Ireland.

== Etymology ==
The townland name is an anglicisation of the Gaelic placename "Dún Mhic Íomhair" which means 'The Fort of Íomhair’s Son'. Íomhair, who lived about 850 A.D., was Lord of Tullyhaw and the son of Cosgrach mac Dúnghal. Íomhair’s son was Ruarc, after whom the townland is named, who lived about 880 A.D and was also Lord of Tullyhaw and an ancestor of the McGovern clan. Ruarc’s name is also preserved in the adjoining townland of Aghatirourke which is an anglicisation of 'Achadh-tigh-Ruairc' which means "The Field of Ruarc’s House" (which was also the birthplace of the Irish Yew tree, also known as the Florence Court Yew, all such trees worldwide descend from that townland). These townland names, along with Moneensauran, supply important evidence that the McGovern clan originally came from Glangevlin and only later spread out to other parts of Tullyhaw such as Ballymagauran and Blacklion. The earliest surviving mention of the townland name is 'Dunnemakevir', from a list of Co. Cavan townlands printed in 1790.

== Geography ==
Dunmakeever is bounded on the north by Aghatirourke, Gortmaconnell, Legnabrocky, Aghnahoo, Tromogagh and Legg, County Fermanagh townlands, on the east by Alteen, Bursan and Commas (Kinawley) townlands, on the south by Tonanilt, Tullyminister and Corracleigh townlands and on the west by Tullycrafton, Ardvagh and Tullynacross (Glangevlin) townlands. Its chief geographical features are Cuilcagh Mountain reaching an altitude of 2,200 feet, Dunmakeever Lough, Dunmakeever Lough North, the Owenmore River (County Cavan) and several waterfalls. Dunmakeever is traversed by the R200 road from Ballinamore to Glangevlin and some minor lanes. The townland covers an area of 1,233 statute acres.

== History ==
In the 1609 Plantation of Ulster, Dunmakeever formed part of lands which were granted to John Sandford of Castle Doe, Co. Donegal by letters patent dated 7 July 1613 (Pat. 11 James I – LXXI – 38, 'Glangewley' & 'Quilkagh'). It was later sold by Sandford to his wife's uncle, Sir Toby Caulfeild, 1st Baron Caulfeild, Master of the Ordnance. Sir Toby had the sale confirmed by letters patent of 12 July 1620 (Pat. 19 James I. XI. 45).

A deed by Thomas Enery dated 29 Jan 1735 includes the lands of Dunmaguire.

A deed dated 13 Nov 1738 includes the lands of Dunmaguier.

In the 1821 census of Ireland, there are ten families listed in the townland and it states- Doonmakeever contains 100 acres of green pasture & 500 acres of BlackRock mountain.

The 1825 Tithe Applotment Books spell the name as Doonmaquiver.

In 1841 the population of the townland was 93, being 49 males and 41 females. There were thirteen houses in the townland and all were inhabited.

In 1851 the population of the townland was 96, being 51 males and 45 females. There were sixteen houses in the townland and all were inhabited.

Griffith's Valuation of 1857 lists fourteen occupiers in the townland.

In 1861 the population of the townland was 95, being 52 males and 43 females. There were fifteen houses in the townland and all were inhabited.

In 1871 the population of the townland was 96, being 56 males and 40 females. There were fifteen houses in the townland and all were inhabited.(page 296 of census)

In 1881 the population of the townland was 105, being 61 males and 44 females. There were fifteen houses in the townland, all were inhabited.

In 1891 the population of the townland was 107, being 59 males and 48 females. There were sixteen houses in the townland, all were inhabited.

In the 1901 census of Ireland, there are fourteen families listed in the townland.

In the 1911 census of Ireland, there are eighteen families listed in the townland.

== Antiquities ==
1. A stone cairn. Described in the 'Archaeological Inventory of County Cavan' (Site No. 123), Patrick O’Donovan, 1995, as- An almost circular cairn (diam. c. 16m; H 3.2m). The NE half of the site is enclosed by the remains of a substantial drystone wall. Situated on the summit of Cuilcagh Mountain on the border between counties Cavan and Fermanagh. The site was known as 'Lacht a mhac a whoole' commemorating McEnhill, chief of a clan driven out of Tyrone by the O'Neills. According to tradition the cairn was used as an inauguration site by the Maguires. In the late forties of this century workers tossed some stones and built a triangulation station on top of the monument (Glangevlin Guild ICA 1983, 42). There are three hut sites a short distance to SE (CV006-003001-, CV006-003002-, CV006-003003-). The website Glangevlin.com states- On the top of Cuilcagh are two monuments about three miles apart, one of which is only a small one called Lacht an Phelim from Phelim O'Dolan who was an ancient proprietor of Gleann Gaibhle. It was erected some centuries ago. The O'Dolans were a wealthy family and owned the townland of Gub. The larger monument was known as Lacht a mhac a' Whoole from a 'mac a' Whoole' [McEnhill in English) the head of a clan who were driven out of Tyrone by the O'Neills centuries ago and fled to the mountains with a party of followers and stayed there until they were betrayed. This monument resembles a fort surrounded by a large wall of dry stone. Near this erection bee-hived shaped huts can be seen. These were probably built by the Tyrone clan. Some say that writers used them and that one night a terrible storm of thunder and lightning broke out and that those writers fled and never returned. In the late forties of this present century workers tossed some stones and built a triangulation station by night on the top of the monument. A date, 11 June 1949, is quite visible. Other stations were built at the same time all over Ireland and were used to map the country. In the fifties other work was carried out by night. Those monuments form part of the border between Cavan and Fermanagh but it is easier to reach them from the Cavan side. Dean Henry climbed in 1739 from this side. Many schools and colleges organise bus tours to the large monument as it is a tourist attraction. St. Patrick is said to have prayed at the Monument.
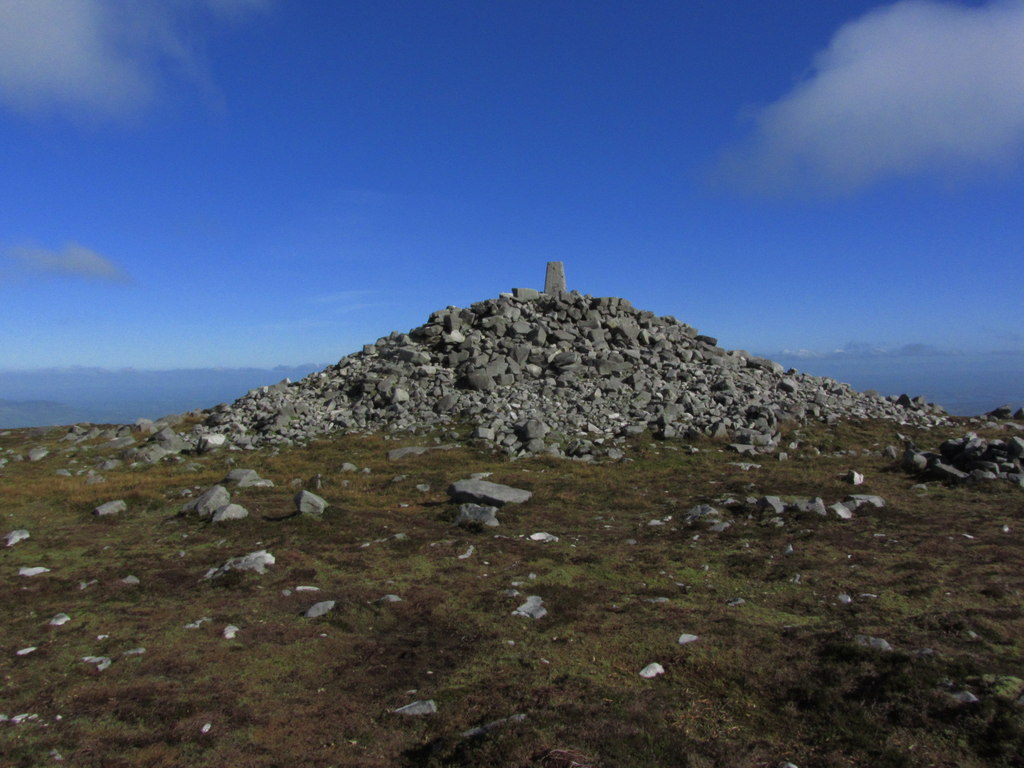
  Cuilcagh - Summit cairn & trig point (geograph 3762624)
2. Carty’s Bridge over the Owenmore river, built c. 1800. The Buildings of Ireland website describes it as- Single-arch stone road bridge, built c.1800, spanning Owenmore River. Segmental arch resting on squared ashlar abutments with squared rubble-stone soffit. Arch ring of regular ashlar voussoirs, with rubble-stone spandrels. Rubble-stone parallel wing walls and parapets of even length. Low parapets with Scotch coping. Appraisal- An elegant single arch bridge of robust construction, that is an excellent example of early nineteenth century civil engineering. The road network was considerably expanded in the late eighteenth and early nineteenth century, and this bridge is a reminder of the materials, technology, and skills that were used for engineering projects at the time. According to the website www.glangevlin.com- it derives its name from a widow woman, Nellie Carthy, who had two sons. She owned a sheebeen and sold "poteen". She was reported to the revenue authorities in Enniskillen. The officers arrived on a Church Holiday. The congregation left the church before Mass was ended and sent word to Nellie that the officers were on the way. The people ran to her rescue and succeeded in hiding some of the "home brew". Some people got across the river Tamhnaigh while others followed pursued by the officers who were challenged and shots were fired. Two men, Doyle and McGovern were killed. Two large upright stones mark the spots where the men fell in the field, bordering the present Doonmakeever road and adjacent to the old Glan road. The Dúchas website states- In the townland of Doonmakiever in the parish of Glangevlin, Co. Cavan on the first road (now old and disused) there are two upright stones close to each other. These mark the place where two men fell when they were shot down by what was then called revenue officers. This shooting took place on Christmas day over a century ago. There was a Sheeven close to Cartys bridge in which a man named Carty illegally sold drink. A local man in the pay of the Government reported Carty, and on Christmas day in that year the aforesaid officer came. They people were coming from Mass, and a crowd followed the revenue officers, and were pressing close on them; they suddenly turned round and fired on the mob and two men fell mortally wounded on the spot where the stones now stand.
