= Derrylahan =

Townland in County Cavan, Ireland

Coordinates: 53°21′N 8°03′W

Derrylahan, an Anglicisation of the Gaelic, ‘Doire Leathan’ meaning The Wide Oak-wood, is a townland in the civil parish of Templeport, County Cavan, Ireland. It lies in the Roman Catholic parish of Glangevlin and barony of Tullyhaw.

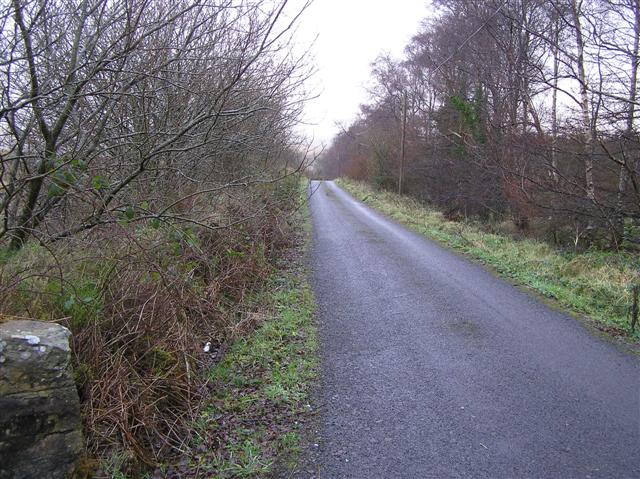
Road at Derrylahan - geograph.org.uk - 1089627

== Geography ==
Derrylahan is bounded on the north by Cornahaw townland, on the west by Carricknagrow, Derrynatuan and Lattone townlands and on the east by Corratawy, Edenmore and Gowlan townlands. Its chief geographical features are Carricknahurroo Lough, Derrylahan Lough, Lattone Lough, the source of the River Shannon in the Shannon Pot,

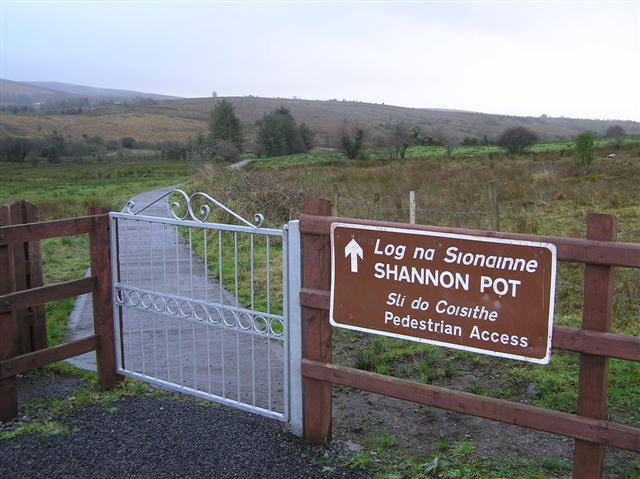
Log na Sionainne (Shannon Pot) - geograph.org.uk - 1089716

The Black River, mountain streams, water sinkholes, a waterfall, forestry plantations, dug wells and spring wells. The townland is traversed by the regional R206 road (Ireland), minor public roads and rural lanes. The townland covers 911 statute acres.

== History ==
An early reference is in the Book of Magauran. Poem X, stanza 2, composed c. 1349 by Giolla na Naomh Ó hUiginn, which states, Innte a-tá an tiobra as dtig Sionann/sruth as uaisle i n-Inis Fháil; (In it is the well whence comes the Shannon, noblest stream in Inis Fáil).

The 1652 Commonwealth Survey spells the name as Dirrelane and gives the owner as Ensigne Walter Reece and others.

In 1720 Morley Saunders was in possession. He leased his interest in Derrylahan to Colonel John Enery of Bawnboy by deed dated 24 December 1720.

A deed dated 13 Nov 1738 includes: Derrylahan.

The 1790 Cavan Carvaghs list spells the name as Dirrelahan.

The Tithe Applotment Books for 1826 list three tithepayers in the townland.

John O'Donovan visited Glan on Monday 16 May 1836 for the purpose of the Ordnance Survey then taking place. He states- We lodged in a farmer's house in Glen Gavlen for two days; on Tuesday we directed our course northwards through the parish of Templeport, over a very bad, rough, rocky road and indulged our curiosity by visiting the large spring well in the Townland of Derrylahan in which the Shannon (according to tradition) had its source. It is a round deep pool throwing out a stream of considerable size which the country people call the Shannon. The pool itself is called by some Poll Lagan Sionna, and Lag Bhun na Sionna by others.

The Ordnance Survey Name Books for 1836 give the following description of the townland- The townland belongs to Lord Annesly and is remarkable for being the spot where the Shannon river rises.

The Derrylahan Valuation Office Field books are available for July 1839.

Griffith's Valuation of 1857 lists thirty landholders in the townland.

In the 19th century the landlord of Derrylahan was the Annesley Estate.

== Census ==
| Year | Population | Males | Females | Total Houses | Uninhabited |
|---|---|---|---|---|---|
| 1841 | 153 | 75 | 78 | 26 | 0 |
| 1851 | 217 | 107 | 110 | 30 | 0 |
| 1861 | 217 | 104 | 113 | 31 | 0 |
| 1871 | 173 | 91 | 82 | 27 | 0 |
| 1881 | 155 | 83 | 72 | 26 | 0 |
| 1891 | 168 | 88 | 80 | 25 | 1 |

In the 1901 census of Ireland, there are twenty-nine families listed in the townland.

In the 1911 census of Ireland, there are twenty-six families listed in the townland.

== Antiquities ==
1. An earthen mound. The 'Archaeological Inventory of County Cavan' (Site No. 1897) describes it as- Not marked on OS 1836 or 1876 eds. A small, circular, steep-sided earthen mound (diam. at base c.4.2m; H 1.3m) tapering to a point. Significance unknown.
2. The Shannon Pot. Local names for the Pot are (a) 'Poll Lagan Sionna', meaning The Hole in the Little Valley of the Shannon (b) 'Lag Bhun na Sionna', meaning The Valley of the Source of the Shannon (c) 'Lag na Sionna' (pronounced locally 'Lugnashinna'), meaning The Vale of the Shannon.
3. Stone bridges over the rivers, including 'Shannon Bridge'.
4. Lime-kilns
5. Stepping stones over the Black River.
6. Foot-bridges over the Shannon and Black rivers.
