= Tullytiernan =

Townland in County Cavan, Ireland

Tullytiernan, an Anglicisation of the Gaelic, ‘Tulaigh Thiarnáin', meaning Tiernan’s Hill, is a townland in the civil parish of Templeport, County Cavan, Ireland. It lies in the Roman Catholic parish of Glangevlin and barony of Tullyhaw. It contains part of the village of Glangevlin.

== Geography ==
Tullytiernan is bounded on the north by Eshveagh townland, on the west by Gub (Glangevlin) townland and on the east by Ardvagh townland. Its chief geographical features are mountain streams, a stone quarry, an iron spa well and a sulphurous spa well. The townland is traversed by the regional R200 road (Ireland), minor public roads and rural lanes. The townland covers 59 statute acres.

== History ==
The history of the townland is the same as the village of Glangevlin.

A deed by Thomas Enery dated 29 Jan 1735 includes the lands of Tullyternan.

A deed dated 13 Nov 1738 includes: Tullytearnan.

The 1790 Cavan Carvagh list spells it as Tullyteirnan.

The Tithe Applotment Books for 1827 list five tithepayers in the townland.

The 1836 Ordnance Survey Namebooks state- Lime is procured and is burned and used for manure.

The Tullytiernan Valuation Office Field books are available for July 1839.

Griffith's Valuation of 1857 lists five landholders in the townland.

The landlord of Tullytiernan in the 19th century was the Annesley estate.

== Census ==
Year	Population	Males	Females	Total Houses	Uninhabited
1841	28	15	13	5	0
1851	9	6	3	2	0
1861	10	3	7	2	0
1871	8	4	4	1	0
1881	8	5	3	1	0
1891	7	4	3	1	0

In the 1901 census of Ireland, there are four families listed in the townland.

In the 1911 census of Ireland, there are three families listed in the townland.

== Antiquities ==
1. Glangevlin Post Office.
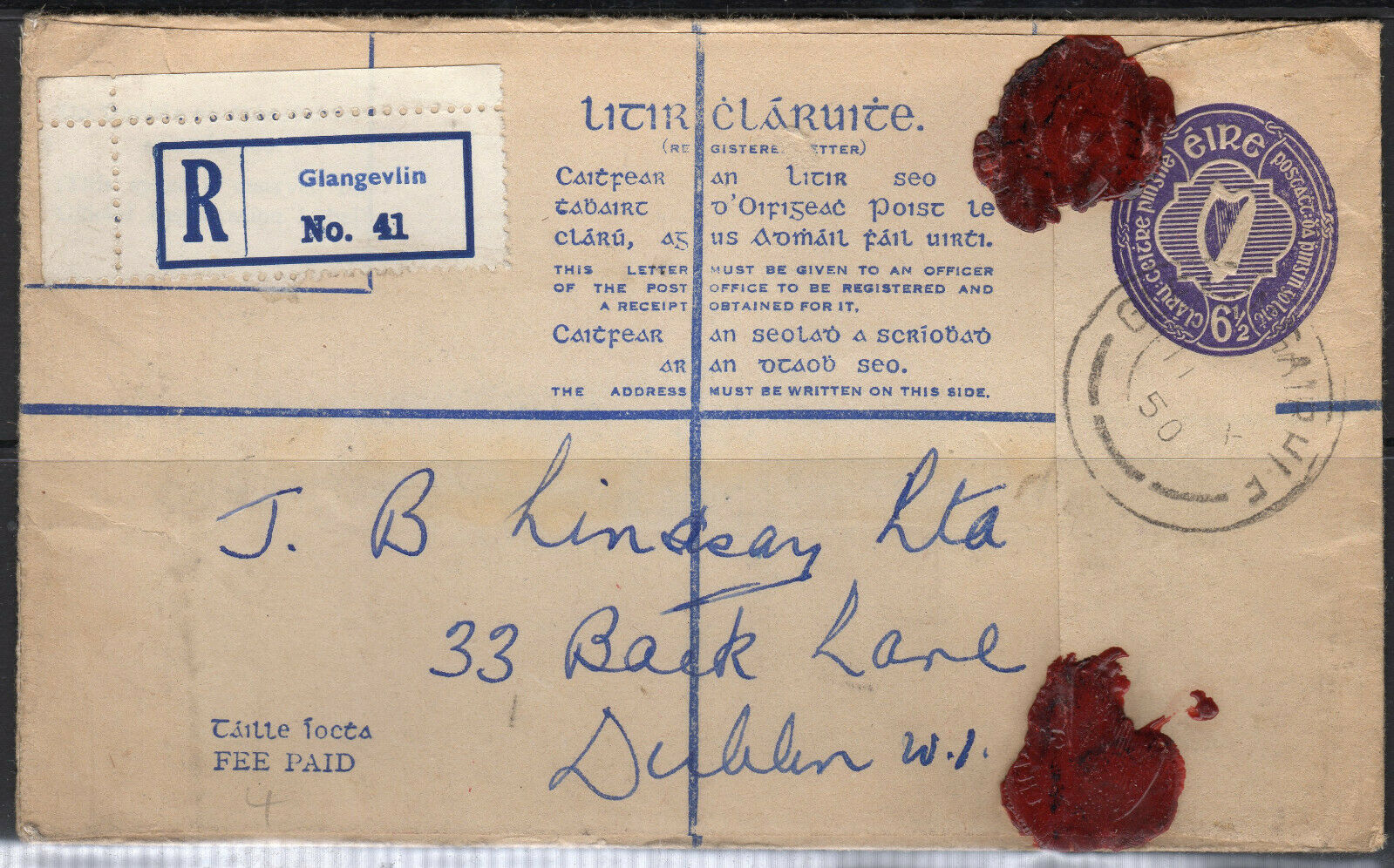
  Registered letter from Glan Post Office 1950
2. Lime-kilns
