= Moneensauran =

Townland in Ireland

- townland

Irish transcription(s)
  - Derivation: Moinín Samhradhain
  - Meaning: "Samhradhán's little bog/relcaimed bogland"
- Moneensauran shown within Republic of Ireland
- Country: Ireland
- County: County Cavan
- Barony: Tullyhaw
- Civil parish: Templeport

Area
  - Total: 704 ha (1,739 acres)

Moneensauran (from Irish Moinín Samhradhain, meaning 'Samhradhán's little bog/reclaimed bogland') is a townland in the civil parish of Templeport, County Cavan, Ireland. It lies within the Roman Catholic parish of Glangevlin and barony of Tullyhaw.

== Geography ==
Moneensauran is bounded on the north by Tullynacross (Glangevlin) and Curraghglass townlands, on the east by Derrynananta Upper and Derrynananta Lower townlands, on the south by Doon (Drumreilly) townland and on the west by Slievenakilla and Legatraghta townlands. Its chief geographical features are Benbrack Mountain reaching to an altitude of 1,600 feet above sea-level, the Owenmore River (County Cavan), Munter Eolus Lough (Gaelic meaning 'The Descendants of Eolus'), forestry plantations, waterfalls and gravel pits. The townland is traversed by minor public roads and lanes. The townland covers an area of 1,739 statute acres and is the third largest in County Cavan.

== History ==
Samhradhán, who lived about 1100 A.D., was lord of Tullyhaw and the son of Conchobhar mac Fearghal and is the progenitor of the McGovern (name) clan.

The earliest surviving mention of the townland name is in deed dated 13 Nov 1738 which spells it as: Moninsafran.

It also appears as Moneenshawran in a list of County Cavan townlands printed in 1790.

In the 19th century the townland was owned by the Earls of Annesley.

The Tithe Applotment Books of 1827 list the following tithepayers in the townland- Annesley, Magauran, Sheridan.

The Moneensauran Valuation Office Field books are available for August 1839.

In 1841 the population of the townland was 222, being 122 males and 99 females. There were thirty-five houses in the townland and all were inhabited.

In 1851 the population of the townland was 185, being 91 males and 94 females. There were twenty-seven houses in the townland and all were inhabited.

Griffith's Valuation of 1857 lists forty-two occupiers in the townland.

In 1861 the population of the townland was 140, being 65 males and 75 females. There were twenty-two houses in the townland and all were inhabited.

In 1871 the population of the townland was 109, being 52 males and 57 females. There were eighteen houses in the townland and all were inhabited.(page 296 of census)

In 1881 the population of the townland was 100, being 45 males and 55 females. There were twenty houses in the townland, all were inhabited.

In 1891 the population of the townland was 107, being 60 males and 47 females. There were eighteen houses in the townland, all were inhabited.

In the 1901 census of Ireland, there are twenty-three families listed in the townland.

In the 1911 census of Ireland, there are eighteen families listed in the townland.

A description of the townland in 1938 by Peggy McGovern is found in the Dúchas folklore collection.

The Magauran family of Moneensauran was the predominant family in the parish. They produced many Roman Catholic priests through the centuries, including Dr. James Magauran who was bishop of Ardagh from 1815 to 1829. His brother Peter and sister Elizabeth Magauran were elected as the King and Queen of Glan in 1815. A rental of the Annesley Estate dated c.1802 lists the tenant of Moneensauran as the aforesaid Rev. James McGowran.

== Antiquities ==
1. A prehistoric stone cairn called Cloghnacommerky situate on the border of Moneensauran and Doon (Drumreilly) townlands. The 'Archaeological Inventory of County Cavan' (Site No. 145) describes it as- Marked on the OS 1836 and 1876 eds. Situated in steep mountainous terrain on the border between the townlands of Doon and Moneensauran. The term 'clogh' in the site name indicates a stone structure. It may represent a prehistoric cairn which was utilised as a marker during the introduction of townland divisions or it may be contemporaneous with this development. Not visited.
2. A medieval earthen ringfort. The 'Archaeological Inventory of County Cavan' (Site No. 995) describes it as- Raised circular area (int. dims. 24.9m) enclosed by an earthen bank and fosse, best preserved at NW. Original entrance not recognised.
3. A medieval earthen ringfort. The 'Archaeological Inventory of County Cavan' (Site No. 994) describes it as- Not marked on any OS ed. Raised circular area (int. diam. c. 40m) enclosed by a very wide but low earthen bank and the remains of a fosse, best preserved at NW. North portion of site destroyed as a result of road building in the early decades of this century and further divided by a field bank running NE-SW. Original entrance not recognisable.
4. A medieval earthen ringfort. The 'Archaeological Inventory of County Cavan' (Site No. 993) describes it as- Raised circular area (int. diam. 22.1m) enclosed by two substantial earthen banks with intervening deep, wide, partly waterlogged fosse. Corresponding breaks in banks with accompanying causeway at NE represents original entrance.
5. A sweathouse. The 'Archaeological Inventory of County Cavan' (Site No. 1884) describes it as- Known locally as a 'duck house'. Remains consist of a subrectangular stone structure (int. dims. 5.3m NE-SW; 1.7m NW-SE) enclosed by a thick drystone wall. Roof is apparently composed of flat slabs. Entrance feature in NE wall (Wth 0.4m; H 0.6m) capped with three substantial lintels..
