= Lattone =

Townland in County Cavan, Ireland

Coordinates: 54.2218°N 7.9325°W

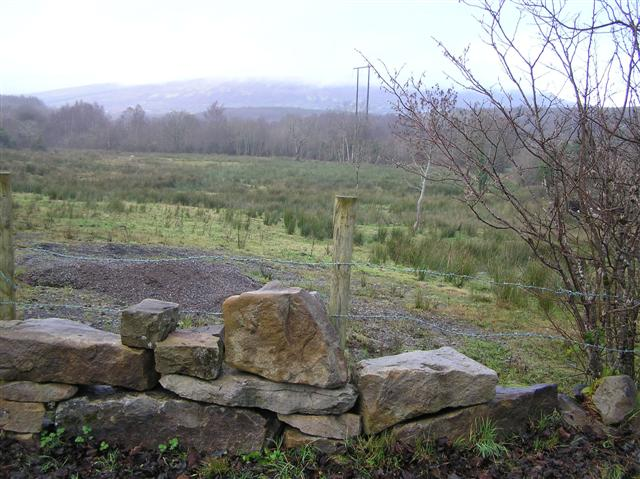
Lattone Townland

Lattone, an Anglicisation of the Gaelic Leath Tóin (meaning "the half-side of a hollow", i.e. a hillside), is a townland in the civil parish of Templeport, County Cavan, Ireland. It lies in the Roman Catholic parish of Glangevlin and barony of Tullyhaw.

== Geography ==
Lattone is bounded on the north by Derrylahan townland, on the south by Drumhurrin townland, on the west by Derrynatuan townland and on the east by Corratawy townland. Its chief geographical features are Lattone Lough, the River Shannon, mountain streams and dug wells. The townland is traversed by the regional R206 road (Ireland), minor public roads and rural lanes. The townland covers 98 statute acres.

== History ==
In 1720, Morley Saunders was in possession. He leased his interest in "Latones" to Colonel John Enery of Bawnboy by deed dated 24 December 1720.

A deed dated 13 November 1738 includes "Lattoones".

The 1790 Cavan Carvaghs list spells the name as "Lattons".

The Tithe Applotment Books for 1826 list five tithepayers in the townland and spell it as "Latune".

The Lattone Valuation Office Field books are available for July 1839.

Griffith's Valuation of 1857 lists five landholders in the townland.

In the 19th century the landlord of Lattone was the Annesley Estate.

== Census ==
Year	Population	Males	Females	Total houses	Uninhabited
1841	43	23	20	8	0
1851	36	21	15	7	0
1861	30	16	14	5	0
1871	24	14	10	4	0
1881	23	13	10	5	0
1891	25	12	13	4	0

In the 1901 census of Ireland, there are three families listed in the townland.

In the 1911 census of Ireland, there are three families listed in the townland.

== Antiquities ==
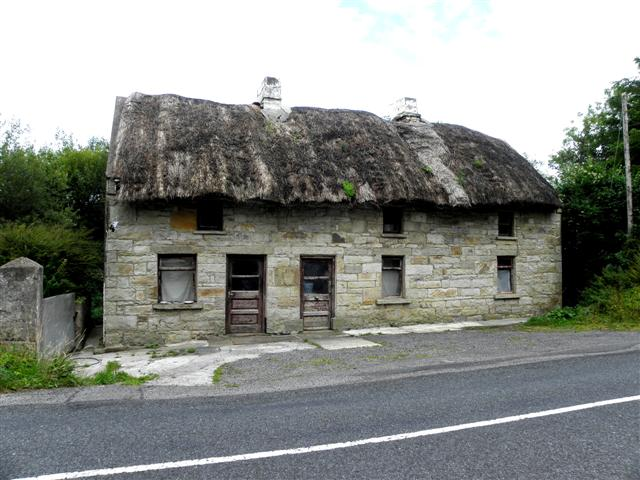
Old building, Lattone

- A boat-house
- Stone bridges over the rivers, including 'Shannon Bridge'.
- A weir
- Stepping stones over the River Shannon.
- A thatched house, which is listed in the "Record of Protected Structures; County Cavan", No. CV03001.
