= Gowlat =

Townland in County Cavan, Ireland

Gowlat, an Anglicisation of the Gaelic, 'Gabhla', meaning The Forks (of the Rivers), is a townland in the civil parish of Templeport, County Cavan, Ireland. It lies in the Roman Catholic parish of Glangevlin and barony of Tullyhaw.

== Geography ==
Gowlat is bounded on the north by Drumhurrin townland, on the west by Corleckagh Lower, Corleckagh Upper and Tullantanty townlands, on the south by Coppanaghbane townland and on the east by Curraghvah townland. Its chief geographical features are the River Shannon, the Owenmore River, mountain streams, a wood, a waterfall, gravel pits, a dug well and spring wells. The townland is traversed by the regional R200 road (Ireland), minor public roads and rural lanes. The townland covers 302 statute acres. The junction of the Shannon and Owenmore rivers is called Nixon's Hole.

== History ==
By 1720 Morley Saunders, was the owner of the townland.

A deed dated 28 July 1720 between Morley Saunders and Richard Hassard spells the name as Golagh and states the tenant of the townland was Tiernan Dolan.

A deed dated 13 Nov 1738 includes: Golvolts.

The 1790 Cavan Carvaghs list spells the name as Galwolt.

The Tithe Applotment Books for 1826 list eleven tithepayers in the townland.

The Gowlat Valuation Office Field books are available for July 1839.

Griffith's Valuation of 1857 lists eleven landholders in the townland.

The Police Gazette states that- on the night of 29 March 1863, the following were stolen from the lands of Dolan, Gowlat, parish of Templeport, and barony of Tullyhaw, (a) A wether, one year old. (b) A ewe, one year old; both speckled black about the head; in good condition and value for £2 10s.

In the 19th century the landlord of Gowlat was the Annesley Estate.

Two fairy stories set in Gowlat are found in the 1938 Dúchas collection.

== Census ==
Year	Population	Males	Females	Total Houses	Uninhabited
1841	109	60	49	17	0
1851	73	38	35	10	0
1861	79	44	35	11	0
1871	74	37	37	10	0
1881	58	37	19	10	0
1891	62	37	25	10	0

In the 1901 census of Ireland, there are twelve families listed in the townland.

In the 1911 census of Ireland, there are nine families listed in the townland.

== Antiquities ==
1. There was a hedge-school in Golagh in 1826. The teacher was Michael Dolan who was paid £9 per annum. The school was held in the teacher's house. There were 57 pupils of which 32 were boys and 25 were girls.
2. Gowlat National School (Roll No. 12,929). A new national school was built in the 1830s and closed in the early 1900s. In 1886 there was one male teacher, a Roman Catholic. There were 65 pupils, 39 boys and 26 girls. In 1890 there were 2 teachers and 89 pupils at the school. The teachers and pupils were all Roman Catholic.
3. A sweathouse. The 'Archaeological Inventory of County Cavan' (Site No. 1870) describes it as- Marked on OS 1836 ed. Not marked on subsequent eds. Situated in rough mountainous terrain adjacent to a stream and waterfall. No visible remains at ground level.
4. A ford over the stream.
5. A foot-bridge over the Owenmore River
6. Stepping-stones over the streams
7. A foot-stick over the stream
