= Eshveagh =

Townland in County Cavan, Ireland

Eshveagh, an Anglicisation of the Gaelic, either ‘Ais Bheathach’, meaning The Marsh of the Birches, or ‘Éis Bheathach’, meaning The Hill of the Birches, or ‘Eas Bheathach’, meaning The Waterfall of the Birches is a townland in the civil parish of Kinawley, County Cavan, Ireland. It lies in the Roman Catholic parish of Glangevlin and barony of Tullyhaw.

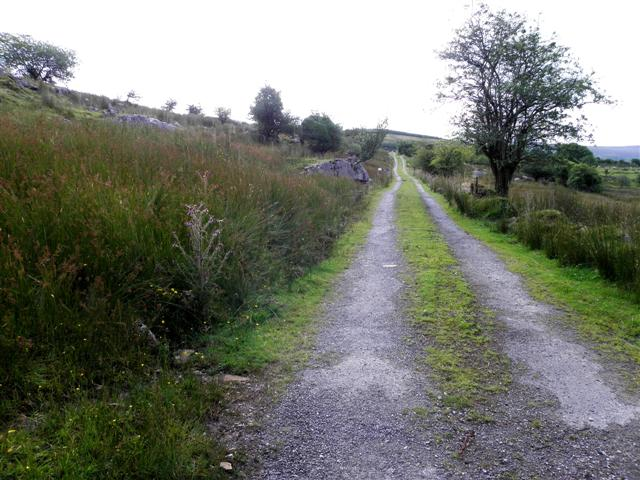
Lane, Eshveagh (geograph 3585964)

== Geography ==
Eshveagh is bounded on the north by Legglass townland, on the west by Gub (Glangevlin), Mully Upper and Tullytiernan townlands, on the south by Ardvagh townland and on the east by Killykeeghan, Tromogagh and Tullycrafton townlands. Its chief geographical features are Cuilcagh Mountain, on whose western slope it lies, Eshveagh Lough, mountain streams, forestry plantations, a cave called The Foxes’ Cave, water sinkholes, mountain pools and dug wells. The townland is traversed by the regional R206 road (Ireland), minor public roads and rural lanes. The townland covers 436 statute acres.

== History ==
In the 1590s Edmund MacGauran, the Roman Catholic Archbishop of Armagh, had a hiding-place beside the well of Eshveagh while on the run from the English army.

The 1652 Commonwealth Survey spells the name as Essbehagh and gives the owners as Mr. Thomas Worsopp and others.

The 1790 Cavan Carvaghs list spells the name as Ishveagh.

The 1821 Census of Ireland spells the name as Eshvaugh and states- Eshvaugh containing 60 acres of green pasture and 250 of black bog & mountain.

The 1825 Tithe Applotment Books spell the name as Ishveagh.

The Ordnance Survey Name Books for 1836 give the following description of the townland- The soil is light, being reclaimed mountain, and the crops in general poor.

Griffith's Valuation of 1857 lists thirteen landholders in the townland.

In the 19th century the landlord of Eshveagh was Leonard Dobbin.

There is a poem about a faction fight between the Dolans and the McGoverns at Gub and Eshveagh.

== Census ==
Year	Population	Males	Females	Total Houses	Uninhabited
1841	112	57	55	17	0
1851	81	43	38	14	0
1861	81	41	40	14	0
1871	67	34	33	11	0
1881	62	34	28	10	0
1891	64	37	27	11	0

In the 1821 census of Ireland, there are sixteen families listed in the townland.

In the 1901 census of Ireland, there are nineteen families listed in the townland.

In the 1911 census of Ireland, there are seventeen families listed in the townland.

== Antiquities ==
1. A stone boundary cairn. The 'Archaeological Inventory of County Cavan' (Site No. 146) describes it as- Not marked on OS 1836 or 1876 eds. Situated on the border between counties Cavan and Fermanagh. Small, low, circular cairn of stones (diam. c. 15m; H 0.6m). Rising from the cairn are four piles of stones, two of which are narrow, steep-sided and tapering to a point (Wth 0.6m; H 1.3m) and apparently constructed from original cairn material. The other two are lower, wider and less well defined. The authors of The Kingdom of Glan (Glangevlin Guild ICA 1983, 42) refer to the site as 'Lacht an Phelim' from Phelim O'Dolan who was an ancient proprietor of Gleann Gaibhle who owned the townland of Gub, and stated that 'it was erected some centuries ago' .
2. The Bush Hotel
