= Ardvagh =

Townland in County Cavan, Ireland

Coordinates: 54°11′48″N 7°52′32″W

Ardvagh (from Irish Ard Bheathach, meaning ''The Height of the Birches'') is a townland in the civil parish of Templeport, County Cavan, Ireland. It lies in the Roman Catholic parish of Corlough and barony of Tullyhaw.

== Geography ==
Ardvagh is bounded on the north by Eshveagh townland, on the west by Tullytiernan and Gub (Glangevlin) townlands, on the south by Dunmakeever and Tullynacross (Glangevlin) townlands and on the east by Tullycrafton townland. Its chief geographical features are Dunmakeever Lough, Dunmakeever Lough North, mountain streams, forestry plantations and spring wells. Ardvagh is traversed by the R200 road (Ireland), minor public roads and rural lanes. The townland covers 307 statute acres,. A sub-division is called Tullycasson (Tulaigh an Cásain = The Hill of the Pathway).

== History ==
In earlier times the townland was probably uninhabited as it consists mainly of bog and poor clay soils. It was not seized by the English during the Plantation of Ulster in 1610. Under the Cromwellian settlement of 1652, Ardvahagh was granted to Mr Henry Crafton & others.

A deed by Thomas Enery dated 29 Jan 1735 includes the lands of Ardveagh.

A deed dated 13 Nov 1738 includes: part of Ardvagh.

The 1790 Cavan Carvaghs list spells the name as Ardveagh.

The 1832 Tithe Applotment books list eight tithepayers in the townland.

The Ardvagh Valuation Office Field books are available for August 1839.

In 1841 the population of the townland was 76, being 46 males and 30 females. There were ten houses in the townland, all of which were inhabited.

In 1851 the population of the townland was 74, being 39 males and 35 females, the reduction being due to the Great Famine (Ireland). There were eleven houses in the townland, of which one was uninhabited was inhabited.

Griffith's Valuation of 1857 lists thirteen landholders in the townland.

In 1861 the population of the townland was 84, being 42 males and 42 females. There were fourteen houses in the townland of which one was uninhabited.

In 1871 the population of the townland was 69, being 33 males and 36 females. There were eleven houses in the townland, all were inhabited.

In 1881 the population of the townland was 61, being 33 males and 28 females. There were twelve houses in the townland, all were inhabited.

In 1891 the population of the townland was 51, being 30 males and 21 females. There were twelve houses in the townland, all were inhabited.

In the 1901 census of Ireland, there are fourteen families listed in the townland.

In the 1911 census of Ireland, there are nine families listed in the townland.

== Antiquities ==
The site of Tullycasson National school. The school was in existence in 1844. In 1979, Tullycasson N.S. was amalgamated with Curravagh N.S., leaving Curravagh N.S. as the sole remaining school in the area. The 1930s Schools folklore collection for Tullycasson school is available at Duchas website. A class photo from 1923 is available at Youtube. In 1921, the first year of Ardscoil Bhréifne, the Irish College in Glangevlin, the students were taught in Tullycassan school.

The Reports from the Commissioners of National Education in Ireland give the following figures for Tullycasson School, Roll No. 4024-

1846: One male teacher who received an annual salary of £8. There were 97 pupils, 77 boys and 20 girls.

1854: One male teacher who received an annual salary of £18. There were 62 pupils, 42 boys and 20 girls.

1862: Peter McAuley was the headmaster and Mary Magauran was the monitor, both Roman Catholics. There were 102 pupils, all Roman Catholic. The Catechism was taught to the Catholic pupils on Saturdays from 10:30am to 12:30.

1874: The school name was changed to Tullycassan Ordinary Agricultural School, which meant it was a national school with a small farm attached. One male teacher who received an annual salary of £30-13s-4d. There were 127 pupils, 70 boys and 57 girls.

1890, Roll No. 13,431: 126 pupils.
