= Tullycrafton =

Townland in County Cavan, Ireland

Tullycrafton, an Anglicisation of the Gaelic, ‘Tulaigh Crofton’ meaning The Hill of the Crofton Family, is a townland in the civil parish of Kinawley, County Cavan, Ireland. It lies in the Roman Catholic parish of Glangevlin and barony of Tullyhaw.

== Geography ==
Tullycrafton is bounded on the north by Eshveagh and Tromogagh townlands, on the east by Dunmakeever townland and on the west by Ardvagh townland. Its chief geographical features are Cuilcagh Mountain, on whose western slope it lies, mountain streams, mountain pools, water sinkholes, forestry plantations, a spring well and a waterfall. The townland is traversed by minor public roads and rural lanes. The townland covers 274 statute acres.

== History ==
In earlier times the townland was probably uninhabited as it consists mainly of bog and poor clay soils. It was not seized by the English during the Plantation of Ulster in 1610 or in the Cromwellian Settlement of the 1660s so some dispossessed Irish families moved there and began to clear and farm the land.

The landlord of Tullycrafton in the 19th century was Sir John Crofton, after whose family the townland is named. The National Library of Ireland holds rentals of the Crofton estate from 1769 to 1814, MS Numbers 20,783 and 4530.

The 1821 Census of Ireland spells the name as Tullycrofton and states- Tullycrofton containing 50 acres of pasture and 302 acres of Black Rocky mountain.

The 1825 Tithe Applotment Books spell the name as Tonycroften.

Griffith's Valuation of 1857 lists five landholders in the townland.

A folktale about John McGovern of Tullycrafton which happened about 1888, is in the Dúchas collection.

The website Glangevlin.com states- Possibly the most famous late 19th. – early 20th. Century member of the Mag Shamhráin clan was Sir Patrick McGovern [1871 – 1933]. Affectionately known as ‘Pat the Glanman’ he was born in Tullycrofton, Glangevlin. In 1891 he emigrated to Boston and took part in the Klondike gold rush in 1896. He found no gold but gained valuable experience. Returning to Boston he became a small–time but successful contractor. Having constructed part of the Boston subway he went to New York in 1908. Here he constructed part of the subway for $22,000,000 and later part of the Philadelphia subway for $14,000,000. His greatest achievement was the construction of a new water tunnel to New York costing $43,000,000. He was a great patron of the Catholic church [paying for the renovation of Killinagh Church in 1929]. He returned to Ireland in 1932 – attended the Eucharistic Congress, and was made a Knight of St. Gregory and a Knight of the Holy Sepulchre by Pope Pius X1. He died on February 22nd. 1933.

== Census ==
Year	Population	Males	Females	Total Houses	Uninhabited
1841	36	18	18	6	0
1851	37	18	19	5	0
1861	35	15	20	5	0
1871	35	17	18	8	0
1881	43	23	20	9	0
1891	45	23	22	8	0

In the 1821 census of Ireland, there are four families listed in the townland.

In the 1901 census of Ireland, there are seven families listed in the townland.

In the 1911 census of Ireland, there are seven families listed in the townland.

== Antiquities ==
1. Stepping-stones over the stream.
