= Tonanilt =

Townland in County Cavan, Ireland

Tonanilt, an Anglicisation of the Gaelic, ‘Toin an Ailt’ meaning The Bottom of the Gorge, is a townland in the civil parish of Kinawley, County Cavan, Ireland. It lies in the Roman Catholic parish of Glangevlin and barony of Tullyhaw.

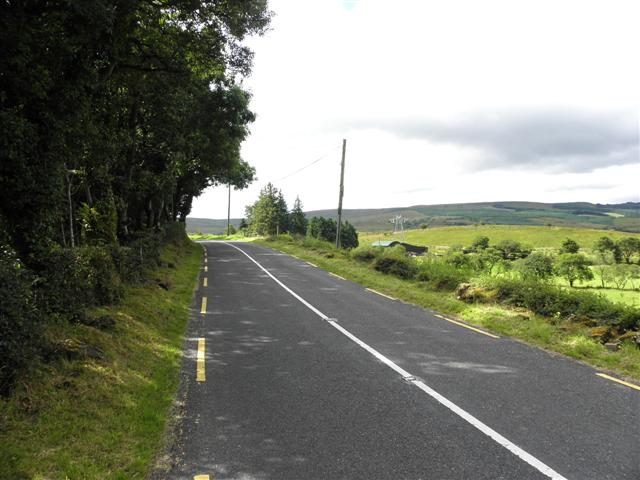
R200, Tonanilt (geograph 3586006)

The townland is also known as Towney (Gaelic- Tamhnaigh = Pasture).

== Geography ==
Tonanilt is bounded on the north by Dunmakeever townland and on the south by Corracleigh townland. Its chief geographical features are the Tamhnaigh river, mountain streams and a waterfall. The townland is traversed by minor public roads and rural lanes. The townland covers 32 statute acres.

== History ==
In earlier times the townland was probably uninhabited as it consists mainly of bog and poor clay soils. It was not seized by the English during the Plantation of Ulster in 1610 or in the Cromwellian Settlement of the 1660s so some dispossessed Irish families moved there and began to clear and farm the land.

The landlord of Tonanilt in the 19th century was Sir John Crofton. The Public Record Office, Belfast holds a map of Hugh Crofton’s estate in Tonanilt dated 1803 under reference number D 3480add. The National Library of Ireland holds rentals of the Crofton estate from 1769 to 1814, MS Numbers 20,783 and 4530.

The 1821 Census spells the name as Towny Glan and states- Fertile fattening land.

The 1825 Tithe Applotment Books spell the name as Tonynelt.

Griffith's Valuation of 1857 lists two landholders in the townland.

== Census ==
Year	Population	Males	Females	Total Houses	Uninhabited
1841	7	3	4	2	0
1851	5	2	3	1	0
1861	17	5	12	3	0
1871	20	7	13	3	0
1881	19	8	11	3	0
1891	7	4	3	2	0

In the 1821 census of Ireland, there is one family listed in the townland.

In the 1901 census of Ireland, there are two families listed in the townland.

In the 1911 census of Ireland, there are two families listed in the townland.

== Antiquities ==
1. A 19th century cattle-pound.
