= Tullyminister =

Townland in County Cavan, Ireland

Coordinates: 54.1875°N 7.8551°W

Tullyminister, an Anglicisation of the Gaelic, ‘Tulaigh an Mhinistir’ meaning The Hill of the Parson (as the land was glebeland belonging to the Church of Ireland ministers of Templeport parish), is a townland in the civil parish of Templeport, County Cavan, Ireland. It lies in the Roman Catholic parish of Glangevlin and barony of Tullyhaw.

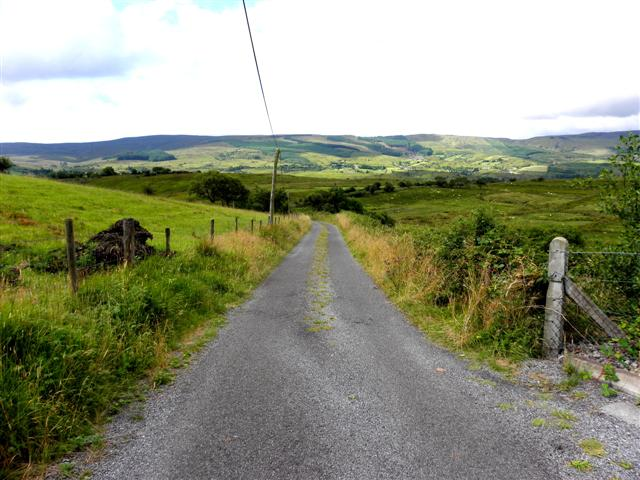
Road at Tullyminister (geograph 3585989)

== Geography ==
Tullyminister is bounded on the west by Corracleigh and Dunmakeever townlands and on the east by Bellavally Lower and Bursan townlands. Its chief geographical features are mountain streams, waterfalls and a spring well. The townland is traversed by minor public roads and rural lanes. The townland covers 55 statute acres.

== History ==
In earlier times the townland was probably uninhabited as it consists mainly of bog and poor clay soils. It was not seized by the English during the Plantation of Ulster in 1610 or in the Cromwellian Settlement of the 1660s so some dispossessed Irish families moved there and began to clear and farm the land.

The 1790 Cavan Carvaghs list spells the name as Tullyvinister.

The Ordnance Survey Name Books for 1836 give the following description of the townland- It is bounded on the north side by a large mountain stream. Iron ore & sand stone can be procured, but neither of them are quarried nor used for any purpose.

The Tullyminister Valuation Office Field books are available for August 1839.

Griffith's Valuation of 1857 lists one landholder in the townland.

The landlords of Tullyminister in the 18th and 19th century were the Protestant rectors of Templeport parish.

== Census ==
| Year | Population | Males | Females | Total Houses | Uninhabited |
|---|---|---|---|---|---|
| 1841 | 11 | 6 | 5 | 1 | 0 |
| 1851 | 9 | 4 | 5 | 1 | 0 |
| 1861 | 5 | 3 | 2 | 1 | 0 |
| 1871 | 8 | 3 | 5 | 2 | 0 |
| 1881 | 10 | 4 | 6 | 1 | 0 |
| 1891 | 7 | 3 | 4 | 1 | 0 |

In the 1901 census of Ireland, there was one family listed in the townland.

In the 1911 census of Ireland, there was one family listed in the townland.
