= Legglass =

Townland in County Cavan, Ireland

Legglass, an Anglicisation of the Gaelic, ‘Lag Glas’, meaning The Green Hollow is a townland in the civil parish of Templeport, County Cavan, Ireland. It lies in the Roman Catholic parish of Glangevlin and barony of Tullyhaw.

== Geography ==
An log glas Legglass is bounded on the north by Legnagrow townland, on the west by Mully Upper townland and on the east by Eshveagh, Killykeeghan and Tromogagh townlands. Its chief geographical features are Cuilcagh Mountain, on whose western slope it lies, mountain streams, forestry plantations, mountain pools and a spring well. The townland is traversed by minor public roads and rural lanes. The townland covers 215 statute acres.

== History ==
The Tithe Applotment Books for 1826 list five tithepayers in the townland.

The Ordnance Survey Name Books for 1836 give the following description of the townland- The soil is light and gravelly.

The Legglass Valuation Office Field books are available for July 1839.

Griffith's Valuation of 1857 lists twenty landholders in the townland.

In the 19th century the landlords of Legglass were Leonard Dobbin and the Estate of Alexander Hassard, whose land in Legglass was sold in 1875 to James Bracken.

The 1938 Dúchas Folklore collection contains a treasure story about Legglass.

== Census ==
Year	Population	Males	Females	Total Houses	Uninhabited
1841	57	30	27	7	0
1851	38	22	16	7	0
1861	42	22	20	8	0
1871	51	26	25	8	0
1881	48	26	22	7	0
1891	26	14	12	8	2

In the 1901 census of Ireland, there are five families listed in the townland.

In the 1911 census of Ireland, there are six families listed in the townland.

== Antiquities ==
1. Stepping-stones over the stream
2. Stone bridges over the streams
