= Derrynatuan =

Townland in County Cavan, Ireland

Derrynatuan, an Anglicisation of the Gaelic, either ‘Doirín an tSuain’, meaning The Little Oak-wood of the Rest or Sleep, or ‘Doire na Tóin’, meaning The Oak-wood of the Low Lying Land, or ‘Doire na Tamhan’, meaning The Oak-wood of the Tree-Stumps, is a townland in the civil parish of Templeport, County Cavan, Ireland. It lies in the Roman Catholic parish of Glangevlin and barony of Tullyhaw.

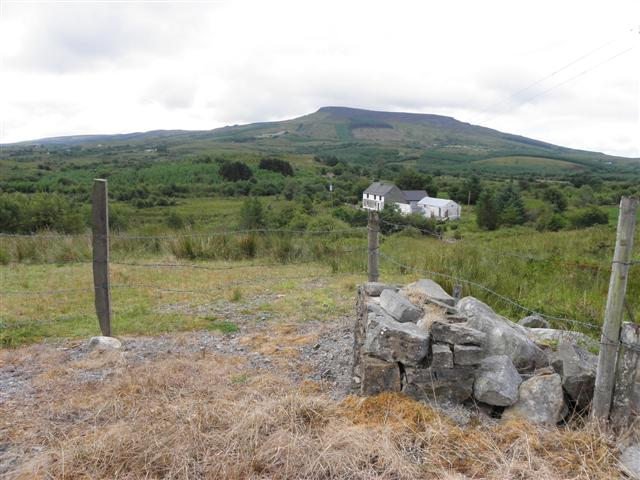
Derrynatuan townland (geograph 3585893)

== Geography ==
Derrynatuan is bounded on the north by Carricknagrow and Derrylahan townlands, on the west by Tullantanty and Tullynafreave townlands, on the east by Lattone townland and on the south by Drumhurrin townland. Its chief geographical features are the River Shannon, the Black River, mountain streams, a gravel pit and forestry plantations. The townland is traversed by minor public roads and rural lanes. The townland covers 185 statute acres.

== History ==
John O'Donovan (scholar) in his Ordnance Survey Letters (1836, p. 16) states- I find it chronicled by tradition that this immortal glen derived its name from the famous cow, Glas Gaibhlen, who belonged to a celebrated Tuatha De Danann smith, called Gaibhlen, who, according to the tradition that still lingers here, kept his furnace in the townland of Doire-na-tuan, near the source of the Shannon, where he melted the ore of the mountain Sliabh-an-Iarainn, and where there has been a forge ever since. The cow supplied all the glen with milk, and, when passing out of it, her udder, which was so vastly large, formed the gap between the two mountains called Beul-a-Bhealaigh, that is, the 'Mouth of the Pass'. What caused her to forsake the glen is no longer remembered by tradition.

The Tithe Applotment Books for 1826 list five tithepayers in the townland.

The Derrynatuan Valuation Office Field books are available for 1839-1840.

Griffith's Valuation of 1857 lists three landholders in the townland.

In the 19th century the landlord of Derrynatuan was the Annesley Estate.

== Census ==
| Year | Population | Males | Females | Total Houses | Uninhabited |
|---|---|---|---|---|---|
| 1841 | 36 | 17 | 19 | 7 | 1 |
| 1851 | 28 | 13 | 15 | 5 | 0 |
| 1861 | 25 | 12 | 13 | 5 | 0 |
| 1871 | 12 | 4 | 8 | 2 | 0 |
| 1881 | 12 | 4 | 8 | 2 | 0 |
| 1891 | 12 | 5 | 7 | 2 | 0 |

In the 1901 census of Ireland, there are two families listed in the townland.

In the 1911 census of Ireland, there are two families listed in the townland.

== Antiquities ==
1. Derrynatuan National School
2. A 19th century corn mill, corn kiln, millrace and cattle pound
3. A 19th century tannery; there is a description of this in the Duchás folklore collection
4. Stone bridges over the rivers
5. Stepping stones over the Shannon and Black rivers
