= Glangevlin =

Village in County Cavan, Ireland

Glangevlin Gleann Ghaibhle
- Village
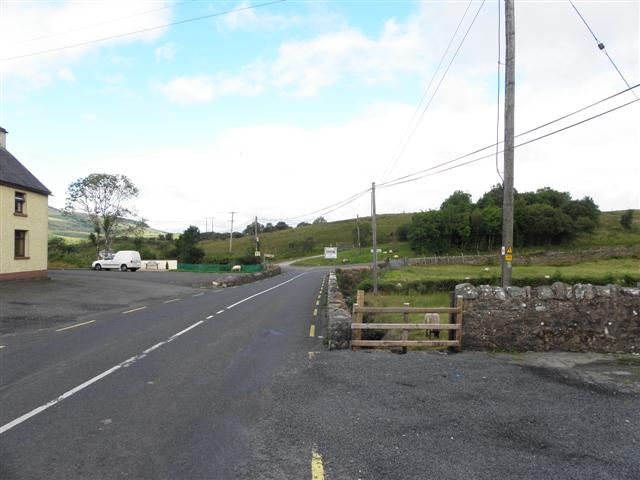
- The R206 road through the village

- Location in Ireland
- Coordinates: 54°11′33″N 7°53′29″W
- Country: Ireland
- Province: Ulster
- County: County Cavan
- Elevation: 127 m (417 ft)
- Time zone: UTC+0 (WET)
  - Summer (DST): UTC-1 (IST (WEST))

Glangevlin (Irish: Gleann Ghaibhle, meaning 'glen of the fork') is a village in the northwest of County Cavan, Ireland. It is in the townlands of Gub (Glangevlin) and Tullytiernan, at the junction of the R200 and R207 regional roads. It is surrounded by the Cuilcagh Mountains and borders the counties of Leitrim and Fermanagh. A large stone known as 'Maguire's chair' is deposited on the right hand side of the road, roughly 4 miles from Glangevlin village, so-called because it was supposedly the inauguration site of the Maguire clan in medieval times.

Glangevlin has a strong traditional Irish background and Irish was spoken up until the 1930s, one of the last places in Cavan where this was commonplace.

Glangevlin is also well known to have been the last place in Ireland to have a glacier lasting from the Ice age. The Cuilcagh mountains were the last affected part of the island of Ireland as well as the most western part of Europe bar Iceland.

== Etymology ==
Some sources, including A Topographical Dictionary of Ireland, published by Samuel Lewis in 1837, note that the area was sometimes "known as "the kingdom of Glan," but more properly called Glangalvin, or the country of the Mac Gaurans.

The modern interpretation of Glangevlin (sometimes Glangalvin) is "Glen with the Fork", but traditionally the name is said to derive from the mythical cow Glas Gaibhleann which belonged to Gaibhnen, the blacksmith of the Tuatha Dé Danann. The Book of Magauran, written c.1340, spells it as Ghleann Gaibhle but it has also been spelled Gleann Gaibhneann, as in this scribal note to the Poems on the O'Reillys:

"I am in Gleann Gaibhneann, now called Gleann Gaibhle, to-day, the vigil of the feast of John the Baptist, 1599."

The Gap of Glan was supposedly created by the cow when it ran away from the blacksmith's forge. In the townland of Derrynatuan in Glan is shown the site of Gaibhlean's forge today. MacKillop's Celtic Dictionary gives:

"Glas Ghaibhleann, Gaibhleann, Ghaibhnann, Ghaibhnenn, Ghoibhneann, Gavelen, Gaivlen, Glasgavelen [Ir. glas, green, greenish blue; of Gaiblín (?), of Goibniu (?)]. Celebrated, magical cow, white with green spots, whose inexhaustible supply of milk signalled prosperity. The original owner is a matter of some dispute, possibly Goibniu the smith or Gaiblín, a farmer of County Cavan or Balor the Formorian of Tory Island".

== History ==
=== Prehistoric ===
Evidence of ancient settlement in the region includes a number of dolmens, ringed forts, caiseals, passage graves and lake dwellings associated with the area. These numerous caves and underground passages provided a shelter for early settlers. The ringed forts were built for defense during the Bronze Age and were used up to the 12th Century and later. They were built of clay, stone and bushes.

=== Medieval ===
The earliest surviving reference to Glangevlin is a poem called Acallam na Senórach composed c. 1180. In the poem Caílte mac Rónáin meets Saint Patrick and relates tales to him about the Fianna. In one of these tales Fionn mac Cumhaill is captured by the High King of Ireland, Cormac mac Airt. In order to release Fionn, Caílte must bring two of every wild animal in Ireland to Cormac. One stanza states- Dhá cháochan a Ghleann Gaibhle, (Two chough birds from Glangevlin). The tale is also found in Book of the Dean of Lismore. A variant of the tale is in the Great Book of Lecan.

The Book of Magauran also contains several early mentions of Glangevlin.

Poem VI, stanza 2, composed c. 1290 by Giolla Pádraig Mac Naimhin, states- Ad chondairc me aislingi tiar ar bord Glinni Gaibhli iarrfoidhmid na haichinti go findum in bha taibsi dar Dia smaith mo tairisi bam breth uaithibh i nairdi. (I had some visions in the West beside Gleann Gaibhle; I will consult knowledgeable folk to find whether they were merely a vain dream; great is my hope, I swear, of being mounted on a horse by them).

Poem V, stanza 5, composed c. 1323 by Lúcas Mac Naimhin, states- Ro bo minci crodh na ceall ar comairci a craibh Railenn tainte sluaigh Glindi Gaibli tre buaibh cilli ar comairghi. (Most often was the kine of churches spared by the Hero of Raoileann; the flocks of the host of Gleann Gaibhle are safe owing to those churches' kine being spared). Stanza 31 in the same poem states- Tug Gleand nGaibli gan ghabhail marbhadh meic Meg Amradain fagus tra in gabhal don glinn in ladhar ge ta ar toitim (That Gleann Gaibhle is untaken is caused by the death of McGovern's son; the fork lies near the glen, though its prongs are broken).

Poem XXIII, stanza 27, composed c. 1339 by Aonghus Ó hEoghusa, states- Ni gael crechi cimsa a tiri Teallach nEachthach anba an toir beth ag on fhir im Gleand nGaibhli fidh ma ceand ni daingni doibh (Tullyhaw's borders know little of being raided- it would be too dangerous!; while this hero guards Gleann Gaibhle- its folk were no safer had they a wood around them). Stanza 30 in the same poem states- Suighfea chugud coigeadh nGeanaind a Glind Gaibhli in greadha luaith ni cuma chael is fearr uirru do thaebh a heang tuilli in tuaith (O Gleann Gaibhle of the swift steeds, thou shalt absorb into thyself the Province of Geanann; thou shouldst have the land beside her angles, for her narrow confines suit her not).

Poem XXV, stanza 30, composed c. 1339 by Niall Ó hUiginn states- O Inis Taidhg go Traigh clainInnsi a craibh Oidbhi les Loch mac nEn ri Gleann nGaibli agus Beann Boinri (From Inis Taidhg to the shore of Claoininis belongs to the Hero of Oidhbhe; to him belong Loch Mac n-Éan, Gleann Gaibhle and Beann Boinre).

Poem XXXI, stanza 17, composed c. 1344 by Maol Seachluinn Ó hEoghasa states- Ni frith orraim dhfhir uaindi a glind Ghaibhli gheguaini re ndhul dha gribh Cunga o chach da righ nirbh urra a oglach (No other man ever got homage from us in green-valleyed Gleann Gaibhle till Cunga's Griffin died, and no common soldier ever dared to act as lord to a lord).

Poem XXXII, stanza 32, composed c. 1344 by Mathghamhain Ó hUiginn states- Borb re comhursain cleath Mhálann, mín re héigsibh a ucht geal, n-a fhaire fa ghlais Ghlinn nGaibhle craidhe fairsing baidhbhe Breagh (Málann's Pillar is rough to neighbours, his bright breast welcomes poets; the big heart of the Raven of Breagha watches over green Gleann Gaibhle).

In 1390 the McKiernan Clan of Tullyhunco, County Cavan and their allies the Clan Muircheartaigh Uí Conchobhair entered into a conflict with the O'Rourke clan whose chief, Tigernán Mór O'Rourke, was in Glangevlin at the time.

The Annals of Loch Cé for 1390 state-

A great war between O'Ruairc and O'Raighilligh; and the people of Anghaile, and Muinter-Eolais, the Tellach-Dunchadha, and the Clann-Muirchertaigh come to join in that war, under the direction of Domhnall, the son of Muirchertach, and of Tomaltach Mac Donnchaidh. The Clann-Muirchertaigh and Tellach-Dunchadha emigrated in despite of Muinter-Ruairc, towards Fidh-na-finnoige, Sliabh-Corran, and Cenel-Luachain; and O'Ruairc obtained intelligence of this whilst he was in Glenn-Gaibhle; and he brought his bands to the upper part of Cenel-Luachain; and a brave, destructive assault was made by O'Ruairc on these royal divisions, who were routed; and the killing of their flocks continued from Bel-atha-doire-Dubhthaigh to the summit of the Breifnian hills.

The Annals of Connacht for 1390 state-

A great war between O Ruairc and O Raigillig. The Muinter Angaile, Muinter Eolais, Tellach Dunchada and Clann Muirchertaig, instructed by Domnall son of Muirchertach [O Conchobair] and Tomaltach Mac Donnchada, entered Connacht. The Clan Murtagh and Tellach Dunchada made a forcible migration into the country of the Muinter Ruairc towards Fid O Finnoice, Sliab Corrain and Cenel Luachain. O Ruairc got word of this in Glengavlin. He conveyed his trains to the upper end of Cenel Luachain and made a fierce and victorious attack on those allied princes and routed them, and kept on slaughtering their cattle from Bel Atha Daire Dubthaig to the top of the Brefne hills.

The Annals of Ulster for 1390 state-

Great war this year between Tigernan Ruairc, namely, king of Breifni and Thomas, son of Mathgamain Ua Raighillaigh, namely, king of Muinter-Mailmordha. And Maghnus Ua Ruairc was at that time in custody with Ua Raghallaigh in the Rock of Loch-Uachtair. The Rock was pierced through and he escaped thereout and went to the castle of Loch-in-scuir and the clan of Muircertaigh Ua Concobuir followed him and he was killed by them in leaving the Loch. Ua Ruairc pursued the clan of Muircertach into Tellach-Dunchadha and they and the Tellach-Dunchadha were defeated, had the prey wrested from them and were pursued from the Ford of Daire-Dubain to Sliabh-Cairbri.

The Annals of the Four Masters for 1390 state-

A great war broke out between O'Rourke and O'Reilly; and the people of Annaly the O'Farrells, the Muintir-Eolais the Mac Rannalls; and the Clann-Murtough O'Conor, at the instigation of Donnell, the son of Murtough, and Tomaltagh Mac Donough, came to join in that war. Manus O'Rourke, who had been imprisoned by O'Reilly in the castle of Lough Oughter, made his escape from it, and went to the castle of Lough-an Scuir; but the Clann-Murtough, being informed of this by his betrayers, they slew him as he was coming ashore out of a cot. A peace was concluded between O'Rourke and O'Reilly; and O'Reilly received great rewards for banishing and expelling from him the enemies of O'Rourke. Owen O'Rourke and the son of Cathal Reagh were delivered up as hostages for the payment of these considerations.The Clann-Murtough and Teallach Dunchadha emigrated, in despite of the O'Rourkes, into Fidh-ua-Finnoige, Slieve-Corrain, and Kinel-Luachain. But as soon as O'Rourke, who was at that time in Glenn-Gaibhle, received notice of this, he took his scouts with him to the upper part of Kinel-Luachain, where he made an attack on them, and forced them to fly before him, killing both cattle and people on their route from Beal-atha Doire-Dubhain to the summit of the Breifnian hills.

The Annals of Clonmacnoise for 1390 state-

There was great dissentions between o'Roirck, o'Relly & the o'fferalls, the MaGranells; Tomaltagh m'Donnogh and the sonnes of Alurtagh came to Conaught upon heareing of the said warres, by the procurement of Donell mcMurtagh and Donell mcDonogh. Magnus o'Roirck remayned prisoner with o'Relly in the Island of Loghoghter, from whence he went to the castle of Loghskwyre, where being betrayed to the sonns of Murtagh, they killed him as hee was leaving the Coytt. o'Roirck and o'Reilye came to certaine articles of agreement, and at last peace was firmly concluded between them, but before this peace was thoroughly concluded o'Roirck gave great guifts to o'Relly for consenting to theese agreements and for banishing his enemies from out of his territoryes; for performance of these articles Owen o'Roirck m'Cahall Reagh was given as a faithfull pledge. The sons of Murtagh and Teallagh Donogh with theire forces made an Inrode upon o'Roirck at a place called ffie fBnoigh; and the Mount called Sliew Corrann and Keann-Kwachar. O'Roirck hearing thereof being at ffye Gaiule, brought his preyes and people with him to a place called Barre and from thence he assaulted the said parties his adversaries, ouerthrew them, killed many of their people and Cattle, and held on his course of killing them from Belagh Derg to the top of the place called Tullagh Brefnagh;

A manuscript entitled Poems on the O'Reillys, contains a note by one of the poets written on 24 June 1599- Is truagh liom nach deuntar enndán don macaomh, dá ndearnadh in dán sin, ar bhfághail báis a ngeimhlibh Gall a mBaile Átha Cliath dhó 1598 agus mo bheannacht fein re a anmuin. A nGleann Gaibhneand dá ngoirtear Gleann Gaibhle anois atú aniodh lá fhél' Eoin Baistí 1599. Agus is isin aimsir so tángadur dhá luing reamhra ó rígh na Spáinne lán d'armáil do chungnamh cogaidh go Gaoidhealuibh Ereand a n-aghaidh Shacsanach (I deem it a pity that no poem is made to the youth, to whom that poem was made, after his death in the fetters of the foreigners in Dublin, 1598, and my blessing be with his soul. I am today in Gleann Gaibhneand, which is now called Gleann Gaibhle, on the feast of John the Baptist, 1599. And it is in this time that two large ships came from the King of Spain to the Irish of Ireland to help in the war against the English).

A poem composed about 1602, stanza 19, by Brian Ó Corcrán tells how the chief of the Maguires of Fermanagh, Cúchonnacht Maguidhir, hunted deer in Glangevlin- I nGleann Gaibhle druim ar druim tug so is ag Sliabh an Iarainn fros mílealbha muin ar muin is prímhealmha os n-allaidh.

A poem about the River Shannon, composed at the beginning of the 17th century by Tadg Óg Ó hUiginn (b. 1582) states in stanza 3- Dúthcha dhuit bheith againne, dá bhféachtha dona fáthaibh: Gleann Gaibhle as é t'athairsi, an Bhréifne as í do mháthair (By nature thou art ours, if sound reasons be regarded: Glen Gavlin is thy father, Brefney is thy mother).

=== After 1600 ===
In the 1609 Plantation of Ulster, Glangevlin formed part of lands which were granted to John Sandford of Castle Doe, County Donegal (the father-in-law of Thomas Gwyllym of Ballyconnell) by letters patent dated 7 July 1613 (Pat. 11 James I – LXXI – 38, Glangewley). It was later sold by Sandford to his wife's uncle Toby Caulfeild, 1st Baron Caulfeild, Master of the Ordnance and Caulfield had the sale confirmed by letters patent of 12 July 1620 (Pat. 19 James I. XI. 45 'Glangewly').

The 1652 Commonwealth Survey spells the name as Glangewly.

In the Hearth Money Rolls compiled on 29 September 1663 there were eleven Hearth Tax payers in Glangowlyn, namely Tirlagh O Davin, Tirlagh O Dogan, Daniell McGawran, Gillebreedy McKelagher, Patricke McGwire, Phelemy Oge O Dolan, Patricke Groma O Dolan, Ternan McGawran, Teige Magawran, Patricke Magawran and Mahon O Dolan.

In early 1708 the famous harpist Turlough O'Carolan was travelling to Mayo from Fermanagh when he was caught in a snowstorm in Glangevlin. He and his guide were forced to take shelter in a miserable cabin where he spent a few days waiting for the snow to clear. Whilst on the muddy mountainside with nothing but water to drink he composed the famous air- Lament for Sir Ulick Bourke. Another of O'Carolan's compositions was The O'Rourkes' Feast, which was based on a poem called Pléaraca na Ruarcach composed by a native of Glangevlin, Hugh McGovern (Aodh Macgowran) c.1712.

By 1717 Morley Saunders, was the owner of Glangevlin.

By deed dated 25 February 1717 the aforesaid Morley Saunders leased the lands of Glanevelin to John Enery of Bawnboy and Richard Hassard.

A deed dated 13 Nov 1738 includes: all the Topps in said Glangevlin.

The Roman Catholic parish of Glangevlin formed part of Templeport parish until 1750 when it was hived off into a separate parish.

A lease dated 10 December 1774 from William Crookshank to John Enery of Bawnboy includes the lands of Glangevlin and surrounding townlands.

The 1790 Cavan Carvaghs list spells the name as Glandowly.

John O'Donovan visited Glan on Monday 16 May 1836 for the purpose of the Ordnance Survey then taking place. He states:–

"After having procured a kind of a dinner at the head Inn of Swanlinbar, wishing to lose no time in that uninteresting village we directed our course southwestwards for about three miles through the Parish of Kil Naile, and then turned northwestwards to make our way into the centre of the wild valley of Glen Gavlen, a distance of 8 long Irish miles. This is the worst road and perhaps the wildest district I ever saw. Situated between the two lofty and barren Mountains of Cailceach and Sliabhan-Iarainn, this valley will never induce mankind to run a railroad through it; its sides are precipitous and rocky, defying the exertions of the plough and the wheeled car, and even of the side car! The loy (a peculiar long spade) only can be used to form the nidus for the potato and grain. The snow lies brooding on the mountains on either side till late in Spring (which prevents early tillage) and when dissolving before the south wind warmed by the sun of spring it (i.e. the snow turned into water) overfloods and injures the sloping fields, the Mistks and Meenies of this Valley of Gavlen. Its road (if road it might be called) is precipitous and stony, and intersected by many deep and rough glens with their mountain streams (now nearly dried up) which makes it very difficult to run a rail road from the City of Bawnboy to that of the Black Lion. Perhaps the future industry of the men of Hy Briuin Breifny may open this important communication after they shall have again set up Magauran as the Lord of the Tribe of Eochy (Tullyhaw)! We lodged in a farmer's house in Glen Gavlen for two days; on Tuesday we directed our course northwards through the parish of Templeport, over a very bad, rough, rocky road and indulged our curiosity by visiting the large spring well in the Townland of Derrylahan in which the Shannon (according to tradition) had its source. It is a round deep pool throwing out a stream of considerable size which the country people call the Shannon. The pool itself is called by some Poll Lagan Sionna, and Lag Bhun na Sionna by others. From this pool we directed our course through the Parish of Killoynagh to hear the names of the townlands in it prounouned in Irish by the natives. They speak the Irish very well but retain no traditions connected with the old Church except that it was built by St.Bridget and St. Leyny, from the latter of whom it and its Parish have received its name. There are two wells dedicated to them which are set down in the name Books and which will consequently appear on the Map. Of St. Leyny nothing is now remembered but that he was a Leinsterman who, falling in love with St. Bridget, followed her hither, but who, when St. Bridget plucked out her eyes to destroy her beauty, repented, became a Saint and built this Church by which he transmitted his memory to posterity with more success than he would have by marrying the beautiful-eyed Bridget. When St. Leynie declared that he was in love with St. Bridget she asked with what part of her he was in love. He answered, with her eyes, upon hearing which she plucked out her eyes saying, here they are for you – a wonderful thing for one to do, who was herself a bastard. After getting the names of the Parish of Kil-Loynie we returned from the Black Lion and Lough Macnean to our host in Glenn Gaibhlean, and the next morning we remeasured our journey along the craggy and precipitous road between the mountains, the only pass out of this dreary district and proceeded southwards through the Parish of Templeport with a view of seeing Father Philip Magauran, a lineal descendant of the last chief of the tribe of Eochy (Tullyhaw) but he was not at home."

The area is described by Lewis (1837) as a mountainous district between the counties of Fermanagh and Leitrim, generally known as the country of the MacGaurans. Around 1837 there was no public road, only one difficult pass; the Gap of Beal. At that time the area was approximately 16 miles in length by 7 in breadth, and was densely inhabited by a "primitive race" known as Mac Gaurans and Dolans, who (it was reported) intermarried and observed some peculiar customs; electing their own king and queen from the ancient race of the Mac Gaurans, to whom they paid implicit obedience. It was also stated by Samuel Lewis that their sole occupation was tilling the land and attending the cattle; potatoes and milk, sometimes with oaten bread, being their chief food; and that the want of a road by which the produce of the district might be taken to the neighbouring markets operates as a discouragement to industry and an incentive to the illicit application of their surplus corn.

In the 19th century, evictions were common in Glan.

The 1938 Dúchas Collection contains much folklore from Glangevlin.

== Townlands in Glangevlin parish ==
Altnasheen; Altshallan; Bellavally Lower; Bellavally Upper; Bursan; Carnmaclean; Carrick West; Coppanaghbane; Coppanaghmore; Corneenflynn; Corracleigh; Corratawy; Creea; Curraghglass; Curraghvah; Derrylahan; Derrynananta Lower; Derrynananta Upper; Derrynatuan; Drumhurrin; Dunmakeever; Eshveagh; Garvalt Lower; Gowlat; Gub (Glangevlin); Knockgorm; Lattone; Legatraghta; Legglass; Legnaderk; Legnagrow; Moneenabrone; Moneensauran; Mullaghlea Glen; Mully Lower; Mully Upper; Tonanilt; Tullycrafton; Tullynacleigh; Tullynacross (Glangevlin); Tullyminister; Tullytiernan.

== See also ==
- Tullyhaw
- James Magauran
- List of towns and villages in Ireland
