= Irish sweathouse =

Archaeological monument type

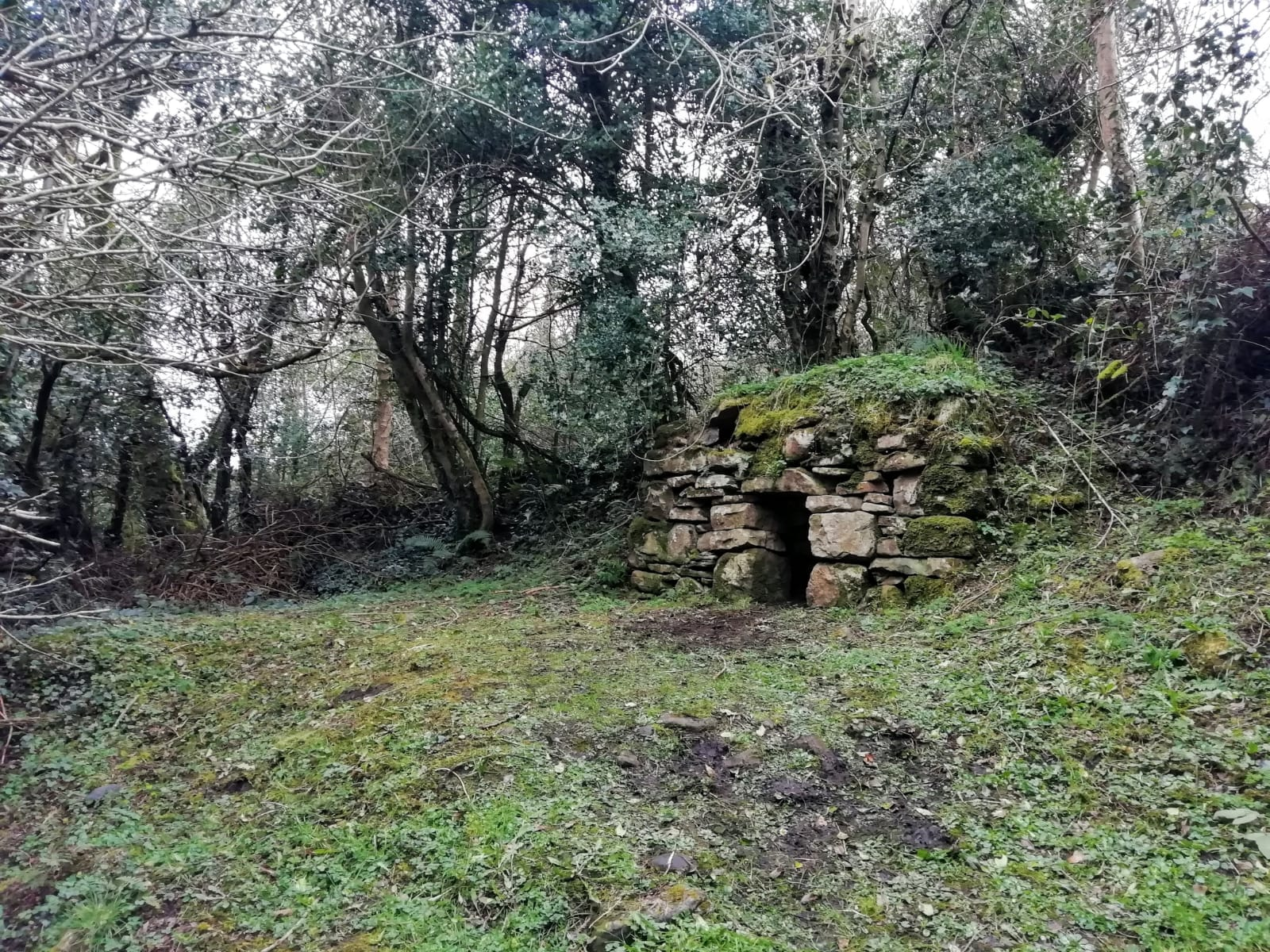
Sweathouse at Cleighran More, County Leitrim, Ireland.

Irish sweathouses (Irish: teach allais) are a type of traditional sauna found on the island of Ireland. In the Irish language they are called teach allais, which translates as 'house of sweat'. They are built using stone and are found in rural areas, particularly in the northwest region of Connacht. They were first recorded in 1796 by French writer Chevalier de Latocnaye, who observed local people using them as a cure for sore eyes and other ailments.

== Distribution ==
There are over 300 sweathouses on the island of Ireland. The Sites and Monuments Record lists 258 sweathouses in the Republic of Ireland and there are 44 sweathouses listed in the Northern Ireland Sites and Monuments Record. These monuments occur in high density around the northwest region, particularly in County Leitrim, where are there are over 100 examples recorded including St. Hugh's Well and Sweat House just off the long distance trail - the Leitrim Way. They are frequently situated beside streams, rivers and lakes, because it was custom for people to immerse themselves in cold water after bathing in the sweathouse.

== Morphology ==
Sweathouses are generally built using the dry stone technique, however, some examples have been built using a lime mortar. These monuments can be circular, oval or sub-rectangular in plan. They are single chambered and windowless, but many have a hole in the apex of the roof to allow smoke to escape.

Sweathouses often have a corbelled roof, but there are cases where a roof lintel is present instead. These structures also have low, narrow doorways, to help keep heat inside the chamber when in use.

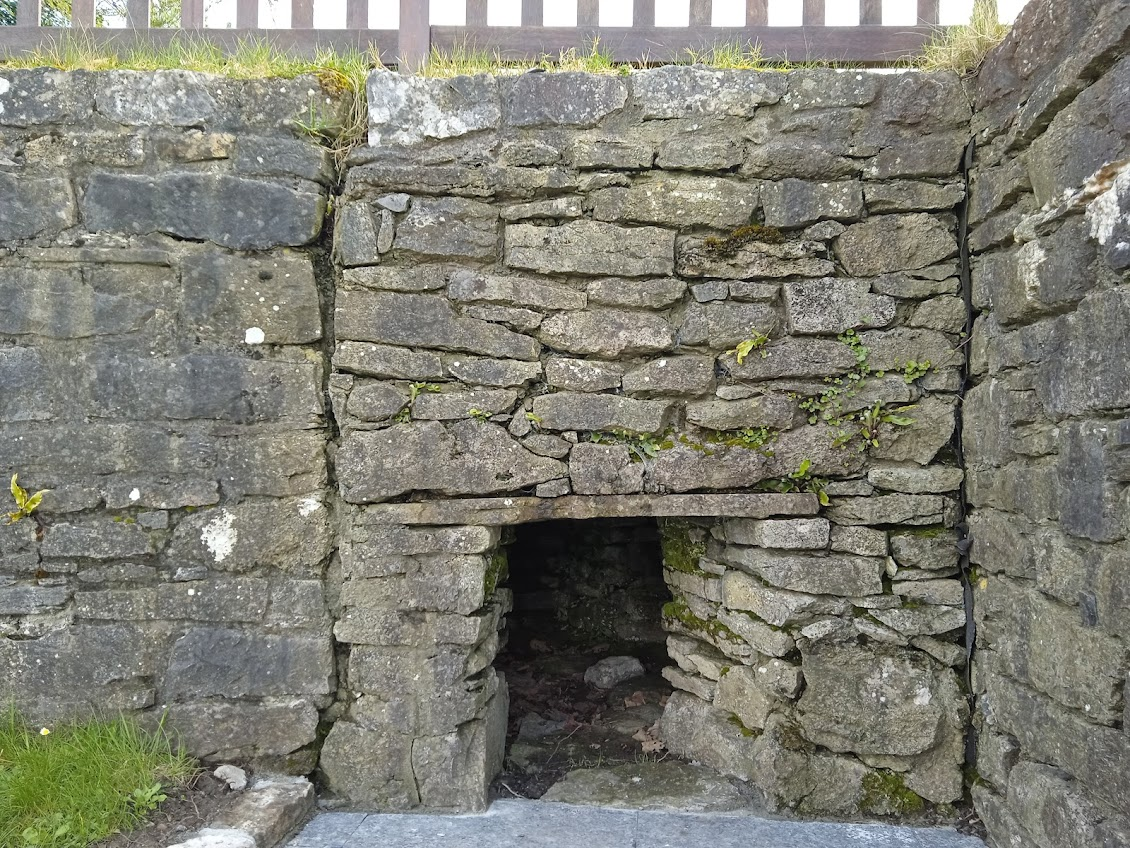
The reconstructed sweathouse at Parke's Castle, County Leitrim. It is not marked on any edition of the historic Ordnance Survey maps, but was included as part of the restoration project at Parke's Castle.

These structures bear a resemblance to other Irish field monuments such as clocháns and lime kilns; in some cases they are mistaken for them.

== Origins ==
It is unclear where the sweathouse tradition originated from. Some scholars believe that Roman missionaries brought the idea of 'hot air baths' to Ireland when Christianity was introduced to the island in the Early medieval period. Others have suggested that the Vikings, who raided Irish coastal settlements in the 8th and 9th centuries, brought the idea of sauna bathing to Ireland with them. The Irish sweathouse could be much older, but until sufficient evidence comes to light, this question will remain unanswered.

== Uses ==
Sweathouses were commonly used to treat symptoms of illnesses such as rheumatism. However, they were seen by some as a 'treatment for all ills' and were used to cure a wide range of maladies, such as fever, sciatica, lumbago, sore eyes, pleurisy, gout, pneumonia, influenza and arthritis.
