= R206 road (Ireland) =

Road in Ireland

Coordinates: 54.204772°N 7.906631°W

R206 road
- Bóthar R206
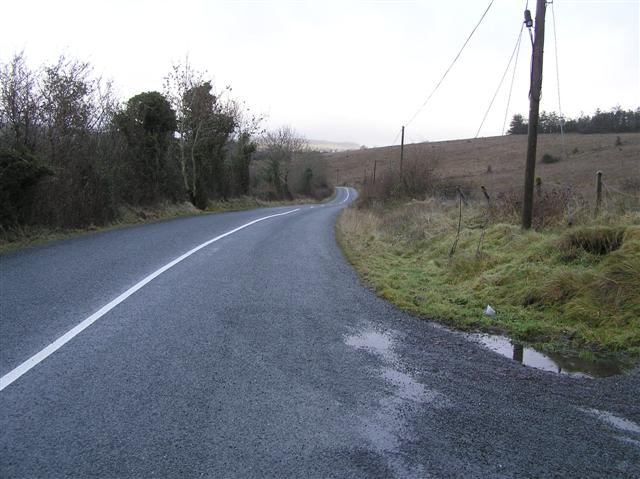
- R206 at Derrylahan

Route information
- Length: 14.9 km (9.3 mi)

Major junctions
- From: N16 Blacklion
- Crosses Owenmore River (County Cavan)
- To: R200 Glangevlin

Location
- Country: Ireland

Highway system
- Roads in Ireland; Motorways; Primary; Secondary; Regional

The R206 road is a regional road in Ireland, located in the border region of County Cavan.
