= Owenmore River (County Cavan) =

River in County Cavan, Ireland

Coordinates: 54°12′37″N 7°56′51″W

The Owenmore River (Irish: Abhainn Mór, meaning "Big River") rises in the Cuilcagh Mountains, in the townland of Dunmakeever, civil parish of Kinawley, Roman Catholic parish of Glangevlin, Barony of Tullyhaw, County Cavan. It then flows in a north-west direction and ends in the River Shannon in Gowlat townland. It has a fish population of brown trout. The Book of Magauran, dating to the 1350s, mentions an Abhainn Mór (Poem XV, stanza 9) but from the geographical description it probably means the Yellow River at Ballinamore rather than the Owenmore River. What cannot be disputed is the Owenmore River's claim to be the "true" headwaters of the River Shannon with the infant Shannon just a minor tributary of it. The Owenmore flows west for 14.5 km (9.0 mi) through the valley of Glangevlin before joining the Shannon about 3 km (2 mi) below the Shannon Pot at Lugnashinna, thus adding 11 km (7 mi) to the Shannon's overall length, taking it from 360 km (224 mi) to 372 km (231 mi).
