= R200 road (Ireland) =

Road in Ireland

R200 road
- Bóthar R200
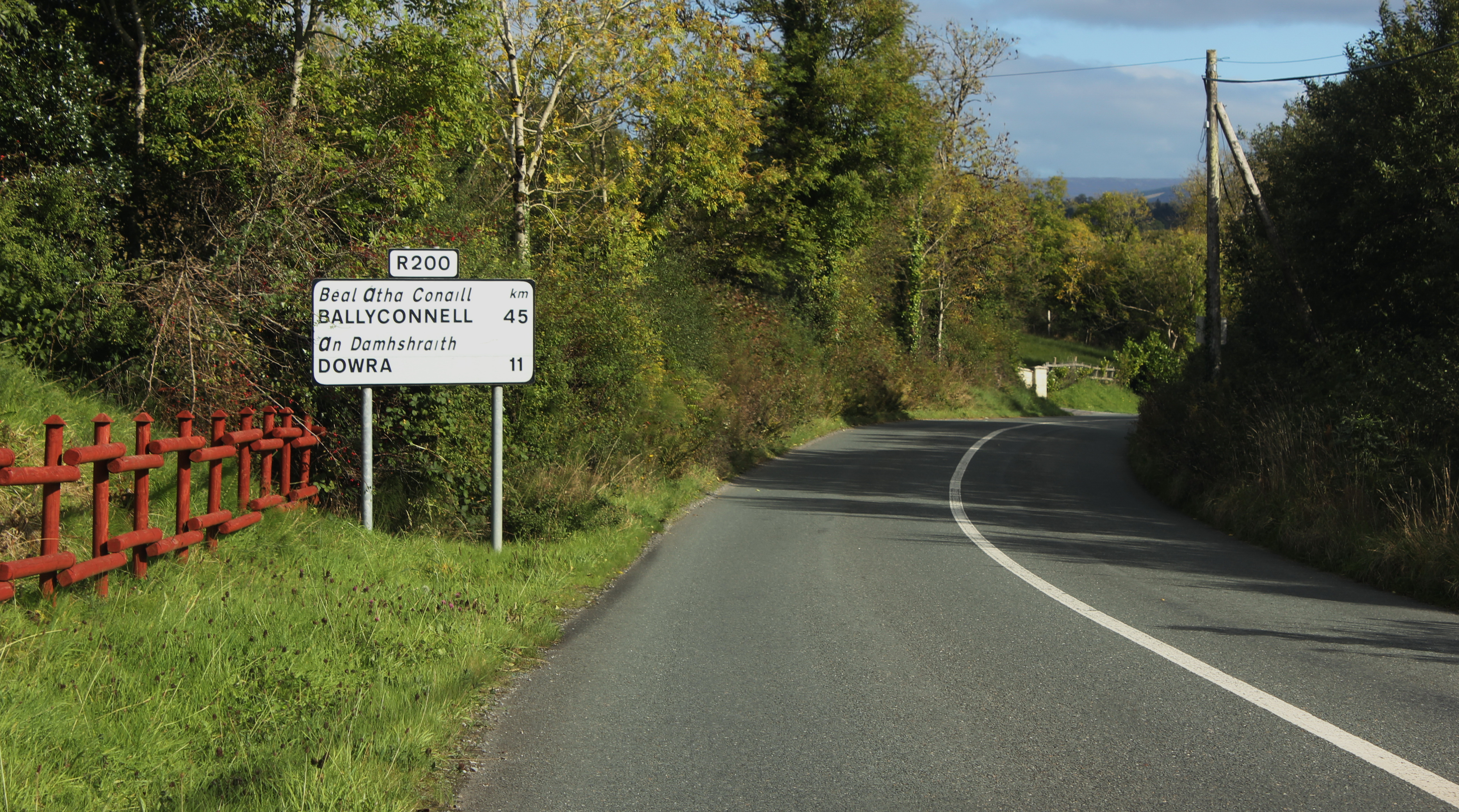
- Leaving Drumkeeran heading east

Route information
- Length: 34 km (21 mi)

Location
- Country: Ireland
- Primary destinations: County Leitrim; Drumkeeran starts at junction with the R280; County Cavan; Dowra crosses the R207; Glangevlin, R206; Derrynacreeve – terminates at junction with R202 and N87

Highway system
- Roads in Ireland; Motorways; Primary; Secondary; Regional

The R200 road is a regional road in County Leitrim and County Cavan, Ireland. Going from west to east, the route connects the towns of Drumkeeran, Dowra, Glangevlin and Derrynacreeve. Along the way, it crosses the R207 at Dowra, meets the R206 at Glangevlin, passes through the Bellavally Gap and ends in Derrynacreeve at the N87 national secondary route. The road is 34 kilometres (21 mi) long.

== Official description ==
The official description of the R200 from the Roads Act 1993 (Classification of Regional Roads) Order 2006 reads (east to west):

Derrynacreeve County Cavan – Drumkeeran, County Leitrim

Between its junction with R202 at Derryvahan in the county of Cavan and its junction with R280 at Drumkeeran in the county of Leitrim via Bellavally, Glangevlin and Corratober in the county of Cavan: Kilmore in the county of Leitrim: Dowra Bridge at the boundary between the county of Leitrim and the county of Cavan: Dowra and Kilduff in the county of Cavan: and Kilmore in the county of Leitrim.

== See also ==
- National secondary road
- Roads in Ireland
