= Gortullaghan =

Townland in County Cavan, Ireland

Coordinates: 54.07514°N 7.810271°W

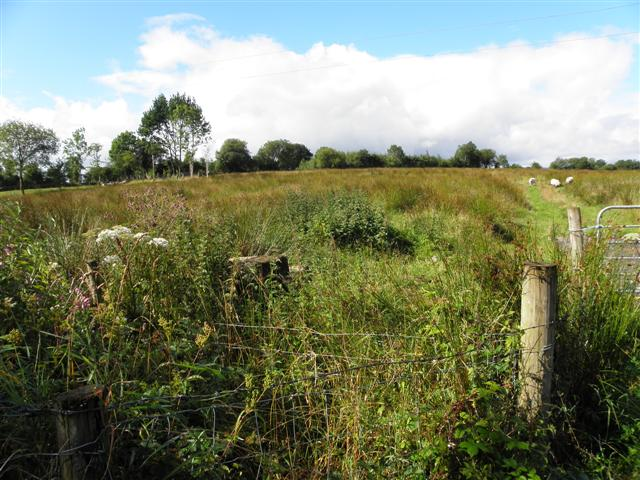
View of Gortullaghan from Gortmore

Gortullaghan (from Irish Gort Tulacháin meaning 'Field of the Little Hillocks') is a townland in the civil parish of Templeport, County Cavan, Ireland. It lies in the Roman Catholic parish of Templeport and barony of Tullyhaw.

== Geography ==
Gortullaghan is bounded on the north by Dunglave in Swanlinbar parish and Derrynacreeve townland in Corlough parish, on the west by Tawnagh townland in Corlough parish, on the south by Mullaghlea townland and on the east by Gortmore and Moherloob townlands. Its chief geographical features are a stream, spring wells and dug wells. Gortullaghan is traversed by the national secondary N87 road (Ireland), minor roads and rural lanes. The townland covers 171 statute acres.

== History ==
In medieval times the McGovern barony of Tullyhaw was divided into economic taxation areas called ballibetoes, from the Irish Baile Biataigh (Anglicized as 'Ballybetagh'), meaning 'A Provisioner's Town or Settlement'. The original purpose was to enable the farmer, who controlled the baile, to provide hospitality for those who needed it, such as poor people and travellers. The ballybetagh was further divided into townlands farmed by individual families who paid a tribute or tax to the head of the ballybetagh, who in turn paid a similar tribute to the clan chief. The steward of the ballybetagh would have been the secular equivalent of the erenagh in charge of church lands. There were seven ballibetoes in the parish of Templeport. Gortullaghan was located in the ballybetagh of "Bally Cloinelogh" (alias 'Bally Cloynelough'). The original Irish is Baile Cluain Loch, meaning 'The Town of the Lake Meadow')

A sub-division of Gortullaghan is called Tomena (from Irish perhaps Tuaim Aonaigh meaning 'Tumulus of the Fair or Meeting-Place' or Tuaim Maoine meaning 'Tumulus of the Wealth' or Tuaim Móna meaning ‘Tumulus of the Bog’)

The 1609 Ulster Plantation Baronial Map depicts the townland as Gortalachin.

The 1652 Commonwealth Survey spells the name as Gartullaghen.

The 1665 Down Survey map depicts it as Gortinelechin.

William Petty's map of 1685 depicts it as Gortenelehin.

The 1652 Commonwealth Survey lists the proprietor being Mr Henry Pigott and the tenant being Farell Duffe McBrian.

A grant dated 30 January 1668 from King Charles II of England to Richard Pyett included, inter alia, lands of Gortallaghan containing 41 acres 2 roods and 27 perches.

A grant dated 9 March 1669 from King Charles II of England to Arthur Annesley, 1st Earl of Anglesey included, inter alia, lands in the south part of Gortinelethin alias Gortinedickin containing 24 acres 1 rood and 13 perches at an annual rent of £0-6s-5 1/2d.

A lease dated 23 December 1720 from Morley Saunders to Thomas Enery of Bawnboy includes the lands of Gartullaughin.

A deed dated 30 Apr 1740 by Thomas Enery includes the lands of Gortallahan.

A lease dated 10 December 1774 from William Crookshank to John Enery of Bawnboy includes the lands of Gortallaughin. as does a further deed dated 13 December 1774.

The Tithe Applotment Books for 1827 list seventeen tithepayers in the townland.

The Gortullaghan Valuation Office Field books are available for September 1839.

In the 1830s Gortullaghan and Tomena was owned, along with other lands, by Luke McGrath of Lakeville House, Gartinardress townland, Killeshandra (the High Sheriff of Cavan in 1809), together with his daughter and her husband, Margaret and Richard Young. On 1 November 1833 they mortgaged the lands to Robert Hutton. Luke McGrath died in 1834, having left his share to his daughter Margaret Young. In 1848 Robert Hutton applied to court to sell the lands in order to get the proceeds of his mortgage and on 10 December 1849 a court ordered the sale. The sale took place on 13 December 1850 and maps of the Gortullaghan and Tomena land sold are still available. Robert Hutton bought Gortullaghan and Tomena at the sale and was still the owner during Griffith's Valuation in 1857.

Griffith's Valuation of 1857 lists twenty one landholders in the townland.

Folklore from Gortullaghan in the 1930s is available in the Dúchas Folklore collection.

== Tomena School ==
The book Bawnboy and Templeport History Heritage Folklore by Chris Maguire gives the following description of the school-

Tomena National School. Taken under the National Board 27 July 1848. There was a teachers' residence attached to the schoolroom. The residence was burned about 1880 and two nephews of the teacher, Mrs. McManus, lost their lives in the fire. Later on the residence became a schoolroom, and Tomena a two-teacher school. A fire in 1944 destroyed the original schoolroom and two teachers had to work in the same room until the new school was built in 1953. Principals in Tomena N.S.- Thomas McPartlan (1848-'51); John Baxter; Hugh McManus, Tirnawannagh; Mrs. McManus; Mrs. Lunney; Mrs. O'Hara; Michael Byrne; Chris Maguire (1937-'42); Rose Maguire (1942-'47); Nuala Waldron (1947-'48); Chris Maguire (1948-'56); Seán Lennon (1956-'59); Cáit Curran; Mrs. John F. McGovern; Mrs. Grace Doonan. Assistant Teachers:- Miss Farmer; Philomena O'Dowd; Mrs. Cornyn.

The Reports from the Commissioners of National Education in Ireland give the following figures for Tomena School, Roll No. 5306-

1854: One male teacher who received an annual salary of £12. There were 73 pupils, 35 boys and 38 girls.

1862: Hugh McManus was the headmaster, a Roman Catholic. There were 121 pupils, all Roman Catholic apart from 12 who were Church of Ireland. The Catechism was taught to the Catholic pupils on Saturdays from 11am to 12 noon.

1874: There were now two schools, one for boys and one for girls. Tomena Boys School. One male teacher who received an annual salary of £30. There were 92 male pupils. Tullybrack Girls School, Roll No. 10889. One female teacher who received an annual salary of £20. There were 75 female pupils.

1890: There were 85 pupils in the boys' school.

== Census ==
Year	Population	Males	Females	Total Houses	Uninhabited
1841	77	32	45	15	0
1851	62	27	35	12	1
1861	56	27	29	11	1
1871	41	15	26	7	0
1881	26	11	15	7	1
1891	23	9	14	6	0

In the 1901 census of Ireland, there are ten families listed in the townland, and in the 1911 census of Ireland, there are twelve families listed in the townland.

== Antiquities ==
The chief structures of historical interest in the townland are the sites of Tomena National School and Derrynacreeve Post Office. The site of the tumulus is not known.
