= Coppanaghmore =

Townland in County Cavan, Ireland

Coppanaghmore, an Anglicisation of the Gaelic ‘Copanach Mór’ meaning The Big Place covered with Dock-leaves, is a townland in the civil parish of Templeport, County Cavan, Ireland. It lies in the Roman Catholic parish of Glangevlin and barony of Tullyhaw.

== Geography ==
Coppanaghmore is bounded on the north by Coppanaghbane townland, on the east by Altnasheen, Curraghvah and Moneenabrone townlands, on the west by Cortober, Drumnafinnila Barr and Tullantintin townlands and on the south by Sranagarvanagh townland. Its chief geographical features are the peak of Slievenakilla Mountain (which reaches a height of 596 metres), mountain streams, waterfalls, forestry plantations and gravel pits. The townland is traversed by minor public roads and rural lanes. The townland covers 436 statute acres.

== History ==
In earlier times the townland was probably uninhabited as it consists mainly of bog and poor soils. It was not seized by the English during the Plantation of Ulster in 1610 or in the Cromwellian Settlement of the 1660s so some dispossessed Irish families moved there and began to clear and farm the land. By 1720 Morley Saunders, owned the land.

A deed dated 28 July 1720 between Morley Saunders and Richard Hassard spells the name as Caponagh and states the tenant of the townland was Tiernan Dolan.

The 1790 Cavan Carvaghs list spells the name as Cappanagh.

The Tithe Applotment Books for 1826 list four tithepayers in the townland.

The Ordnance Survey Name Books for 1836 give the following description of the townland- The soil is of a blue gravelly nature...there is plenty of lime stone on the land but it is not quarried nor used for any purpose whatever.

The Coppanaghmore Valuation Office Field books are available for July 1839.

Griffith's Valuation of 1857 lists twenty-two landholders in the townland.

In the 19th century the landlord of Coppanaghmore was the Annesley Estate.

== Census ==
| Year | Population | Males | Females | Total Houses | Uninhabited |
|---|---|---|---|---|---|
| 1841 | 72 | 41 | 31 | 12 | 0 |
| 1851 | 50 | 24 | 26 | 8 | 0 |
| 1861 | 65 | 35 | 30 | 9 | 0 |
| 1871 | 49 | 20 | 29 | 8 | 0 |
| 1881 | 44 | 20 | 24 | 7 | 0 |
| 1891 | 39 | 19 | 20 | 7 | 0 |

In the 1901 census of Ireland, there are twelve families listed in the townland.

In the 1911 census of Ireland, there are eleven families listed in the townland.

== Antiquities ==
1. A stone boundary cairn. The 'Archaeological Inventory of County Cavan' (Site no. 137) describes it as- Not marked on OS 1836 or 1876 eds. Situated on the border between counties Cavan and Leitrim. Probably a boundary cairn. Not visited.
2. A stone boundary cairn. The 'Archaeological Inventory of County Cavan' (Site no. 138) describes it as- Not marked on OS 1836 or 1876 eds. Situated on the border between counties Cavan and Leitrim. Probably a boundary cairn. Not visited.
3. A boundary mound. The 'Archaeological Inventory of County Cavan' (Site no. 139) describes it as- Not marked on OS 1836 or 1876 eds. Situated on the border between counties Cavan and Leitrim. Most likely a boundary cairn. Not visited.
4. A boundary mound. The 'Archaeological Inventory of County Cavan' (Site no. 140) describes it as- Not marked on OS 1836 or 1876 eds. Situated on the border between the townlands of Coppanaghmore and Tullantintin (both in County Cavan) and between counties Cavan and Leitrim. Most likely a boundary mound. Not visited.
5. Stepping-stones across the river.
6. Coppanagh National School, Roll No. 7282. In 1856 there was one male teacher. There were 85 pupils, 47 boys and 38 girls. In 1862 Thomas Christy was the headmaster, a Roman Catholic. There were 80 pupils, all Roman Catholic. The Catechism was taught to the Catholic pupils on Saturdays from 10am to 12 noon. In 1874 there was one male teacher who received an annual salary of £38. There were 102 pupils, 52 boys and 50 girls.
