= Carnmaclean =

Townland in County Cavan, Ireland

Carnmaclean, an Anglicisation of the Irish ‘Carn Mhic Giolla Éain’, meaning McClean’s Cairn, is a townland in the civil parish of Templeport, barony of Tullyhaw, County Cavan, Ireland.

== Geography ==
Carnmaclean is bounded on the north by Garvalt Lower and Moneenabrone townlands, on the east by Carrick West and Tullynacleigh townlands, on the west by Mullaghlea Glen townland and on the south by Altshallan townland. Its chief geographical features are mountain streams, waterfalls, forestry plantations, a stone quarry and spring wells. Carnmaclean is traversed by minor public roads and rural lanes. The townland covers 186 statute acres.

== History ==
In earlier times the townland was probably uninhabited as it consists mainly of bog and poor clay soils. It was not seized by the English during the Plantation of Ulster in 1610 or in the Cromwellian Settlement of the 1660s so some dispossessed Irish families moved there and began to clear and farm the land. By 1720 Morley Saunders, was the owner of the townland.

By deed dated 24 December 1720 the aforesaid Morley Saunders leased, inter alia, the townland of Carnmacleane to Thomas Enery of Bawnboy for a term of 41 years.

A deed dated 13 Nov 1738 includes: Carmaclean.

A deed dated 30 April 1740 by the aforesaid Thomas Enery includes: Carinacleain.

By 1778 it was in the possession of Francis Annesley, 1st Earl Annesley. An 1802 Rental of the Annesley Estate mentions a lease of Carmaclean for 31 years dated 1 May 1778 from the Annesley Estate to a tenant, Andrew Brady.

The Tithe Applotment Books for 1826 list three tithepayers in the townland.

The Ordnance Survey Name Books for 1836 give the following description of the townland- The soil is of a blue gravelly nature...There is limestone in abundance. It is quarried and used for building but there is none sold.

The Carnmaclean Valuation Office Field books are available for August 1839.

Griffith's Valuation of 1857 lists eight landholders in the townland.

In the 19th century the landlord of Carnmaclean was the Annesley Estate.

== Census ==
Year	Population	Males	Females	Total Houses	Uninhabited
1841	32	17	15	4	0
1851	29	21	8	4	0
1861	26	18	8	4	0
1871	20	13	7	3	0
1881	21	11	10	3	0
1891	25	16	9	4	0

In the 1901 census of Ireland, there are five families listed in the townland, and in the 1911 census of Ireland, four families.

== Religion ==
Carnmaclean lies in the Roman Catholic parish of Glangevlin.
