= Drumcanon (Kinawley) =

- Townland
- Location in Ireland
- Coordinates: 54°09′42″N 7°42′58″W
- Country: Ireland
- County: County Cavan
- Parish: Kinawley

Drumcanon (Irish derived place name, either Droim Ceannann, meaning 'The White-Topped Ridge' or Droim Ceann-Fhine, meaning 'The Ridge of the Spotted Cow or Droim Ceann Fhionn, meaning 'The Speckled Ridge') is a townland in the civil parish of Kinawley, barony of Tullyhaw, County Cavan, Ireland.

== Geography ==
Drumcanon is bounded on the north by Drumboory townland, on the south by Derrynacreeve townland, on the west by Drumcar (Kinawley) townland and on the east by Borim (Kinawley), Dunglave and Gortlaunaght townlands. Its chief geographical features are the Blackwater river which later flows into the River Cladagh (Swanlinbar), mountain streams and dug wells. Drumcanon is traversed by the national secondary N87 road (Ireland), minor public roads and rural lanes. The townland covers 71 statute acres.

== History ==
In medieval times Drumcanon was owned by the McGovern Clan and formed part of a ballybetagh spelled (variously) Aghycloony, Aghcloone, Nacloone, Naclone and Noclone (Irish derived place name Áth Chluain, meaning the 'Ford of the Meadow'). The 1609 Baronial Map depicts the ballybetagh as Naclone.

In the Plantation of Ulster by grant dated 26 June 1615, King James VI and I granted, inter alia, The precinct or parcel of Nacloone otherwise Aghcloone to Sir George Graeme and Sir Richard Graeme to form part of the Manor of Greame. A history of Richard and George Graham is viewable online. The Grahams took part in the Irish Rebellion of 1641 and after the war their lands were confiscated under the Act for the Settlement of Ireland 1652 and distributed as follows-

The 1652 Commonwealth Survey spells the townland as Dromcanon and lists the proprietor as Mr Thomas Worshipp and the tenants as William Graham & others, so the Graham family were reduced to tenant status.

The 1655 Down Survey map of Tullyhaw depicts the townland as Drumtannan.

William Petty's 1685 map depicts it as Drumtannan.

In a deed dated 28 July 1720 Morley Saunders granted to Richard Hassard, inter alia,- the lands of Drumcannon now in the possession, tenure or occupation of Cormick mac Tiernan McGawran or his undertaker.

A deed by Thomas Enery dated 29 Jan 1735 includes the lands of Drumcanon.

In a deed dated 13 August 1738 John Enery conveyed to Richard Hassard, inter alia, the lands of Drumcannon.

A deed dated 13 December 1774 by John Enery spells the townland as Drumcanon otherwise Drumcannon.

The 1790 Cavan Carvaghs List spells the name as-Drumkanine.

The 1821 Census of Ireland spells the name as Drumcannon and states- containing 100 acres of pasture & 71 acres of mountain & bogs. There is a corn mill & kiln on the land.

Estate maps of 1831 spell the name as Drumcannon and list the owner as Jason Hassard.

The Tithe Applotment Books 1834 spell the name as Drumcannon.

The Drumcanon Valuation Office Field books are available for June 1840.

Griffith's Valuation of 1857 lists thirteen landholders in the townland.

The landlords of Drumcanon in the 19th century were the Hassard Estate and Tubman Estate.

== Census ==
| Year | Population | Males | Females | Total Houses | Uninhabited |
|---|---|---|---|---|---|
| 1841 | 54 | 25 | 29 | 10 | 1 |
| 1851 | 54 | 24 | 30 | 11 | 1 |
| 1861 | 39 | 20 | 19 | 8 | 3 |
| 1871 | 31 | 15 | 16 | 5 | 0 |
| 1881 | 26 | 11 | 15 | 5 | 0 |
| 1891 | 19 | 10 | 9 | 5 | 0 |

In the Census of Ireland 1821, there were forty-nine families living in the townland.

In the 1901 census of Ireland, there were six families listed in the townland.

In the 1911 census of Ireland, there were ten families listed in the townland.

== Antiquities ==
1. Stone bridges over the river
2. A 19th century corn-mill and corn-kiln. The owner was James Seales of Drumboory. The mill was three stories high. Folklore about the mill is in the Dúchas collection.
3. A lime-kiln.
