= Moherloob =

Townland in the civil parish of Templeport, County Cavan, Ireland

Coordinates: 54.07514°N 7.810271°W

Moherloob (from Irish Mothar Lúib meaning 'Thicket of the Riverbend') is a small townland in the civil parish of Templeport, County Cavan, Ireland. It is 0.45 square kilometres (0.17 sq mi) in area and lies in the barony of Tullyhaw. As of the 2011 census, there were no people living in Moherloob.

== Geography ==
Moherloob is bounded on the north by Gortmore and Moherreagh townlands, on the west by Gortullaghan townland and on the south and east by Mullaghlea townland. Its chief geographical features are a stream, forestry plantations and dug wells. Moherloob is traversed by minor roads and rural lanes. The townland covers 111 statute acres.

== History ==
In medieval times the McGovern barony of Tullyhaw was divided into economic taxation areas called ballibetoes, from the Irish Baile Biataigh (Anglicized as 'Ballybetagh'), meaning 'A Provisioner's Town or Settlement'. The original purpose was to enable the farmer, who controlled the baile, to provide hospitality for those who needed it, such as poor people and travellers. The ballybetagh was further divided into townlands farmed by individual families who paid a tribute or tax to the head of the ballybetagh, who in turn paid a similar tribute to the clan chief. The steward of the ballybetagh would have been the secular equivalent of the erenagh in charge of church lands. There were seven ballibetoes in the parish of Templeport. Moherloob was located in the ballybetagh of "Bally Cloinelogh" (alias 'Bally Cloynelough'). The original Irish is Baile Cluain Loch, meaning 'The Town of the Lake Meadow')

The 1609 Ulster Plantation Baronial Map depicts the townland as part of Aghalough (Irish 'Achadh Locha' meaning "The Field of the Lake".

The 1652 Commonwealth Survey lists the name as Moherloob.

The 1665 Down Survey map depicts it as Maghaloroby.

William Petty's 1685 map depicts it as Mahalloroby.

On 19 January 1586 Queen Elizabeth I of England granted a pardon (No. 4813) to Teig Oge M’Teig M’Tirlagh O Dollan of Aghholagh for fighting against the Queen's forces.

In the Plantation of Ulster by grant dated 24 February 1614, King James VI and I granted, inter alia, one pole of Mogherlooby to Phelim McHugh O'Reyly, Bryan McHugh O'Reyly and Cahir McHugh O'Reyly, the sons of Hugh Reyly, late of Ballaghaneo, County Cavan. Ballaghaneo is now the townland of Ballaghanea in Lurgan Parish, County Cavan, on the shores of Lough Ramor, so the O'Reillys were removed a long way from their home by the Plantation. Hugh Reyly was the great-grandnephew of the chief of the O'Reilly clan, Eoghan na Fésóige mac Seoain, who ruled from 1418–1449. The O’Reilly lands in Moherloob were confiscated in the Cromwellian Act for the Settlement of Ireland 1652 and were distributed as follows-

The 1652 Commonwealth Survey lists the proprietor as Captain Payne and the tenant as Caffeira O'Dolan.

In the Hearth Money Rolls of 1662 there was nobody paying the Hearth Tax in Moherloob.

A lease dated 23 December 1720 from Morley Saunders to Thomas Enery of Bawnboy includes the lands of Morherlube.

A deed dated 30 April 1740 by Thomas Enery includes: Moherlube.

A lease dated 10 December 1774 from William Crookshank to John Enery of Bawnboy includes the lands of Moherlube, as does a further deed dated 13 December 1774.

The 1790 Cavan Carvaghs list spells the name as Mogher, Loob.

In the 1825 Registry of Freeholders for County Cavan there were four freeholders registered in Moherloob- Hugh Donnelly, Terence Farry, Michael Golrake and Farrell King. They were all Forty-shilling freeholders holding a lease for lives from their landlord Mr. Magrath.

The Tithe Applotment Books for 1827 list six tithepayers in the townland.

The Moherloob Valuation Office Field books are available for November 1839.

In the 1830s Moherloob was owned, along with other lands, by Luke McGrath of Lakeville House, Gartinardress townland, Killeshandra (the High Sheriff of Cavan in 1809), together with his daughter and her husband, Margaret and Richard Young. On 1 November 1833 they mortgaged the lands to Robert Hutton. Luke McGrath died in 1834, having left his share to his daughter Margaret Young. In 1848 Robert Hutton applied to court to sell the lands in order to get the proceeds of his mortgage and on 10 December 1849 a court ordered the sale. The sale took place on 13 December 1850 and maps of the Moherloob land sold are still available. Robert Hutton bought Moherloob at the sale and was still the owner during Griffith's Valuation in 1857.

Griffith's Valuation of 1857 lists five landholders in the townland.

== Census ==
| Year | Population | Males | Females | Total Houses | Uninhabited |
|---|---|---|---|---|---|
| 1841 | 55 | 24 | 31 | 11 | 0 |
| 1851 | 27 | 15 | 12 | 5 | 0 |
| 1861 | 19 | 9 | 10 | 6 | 1 |
| 1871 | 25 | 12 | 13 | 6 | 0 |
| 1881 | 27 | 13 | 14 | 6 | 0 |
| 1891 | 21 | 13 | 8 | 6 | 0 |

In the 1901 census of Ireland, there are five families listed in the townland, and in the 1911 census of Ireland, there are only four families listed in the townland.

== Antiquities ==
1. An earthen ringfort.
2. An earthen ringfort.
3. Stepping stones across the stream
