= Coppanaghbane =

Townland in County Cavan, Ireland

Coppanaghbane, an Anglicisation of the Gaelic ‘Copanach Bán’ meaning The White Place covered with Dock-leaves (probably referring to the white limestone soil), is a townland in the civil parish of Templeport, County Cavan, Ireland. It lies in the Roman Catholic parish of Glangevlin and barony of Tullyhaw.

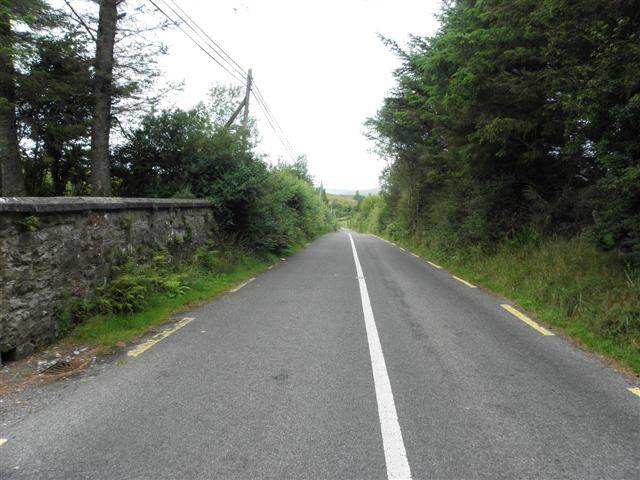
R200, Coppanaghbane (geograph 3586668)

== Geography ==
Coppanaghbane is bounded on the north by Corleckagh Upper and Gowlat townlands, on the east by Curraghvah townland, on the west by Tullantintin townland and on the south by Coppanaghmore townland. Its chief geographical features are Slievenakilla Mountain (on which northern side it lies), mountain streams, waterfalls, forestry plantations and gravel pits. The townland is traversed by the regional R200 road (Ireland), minor public roads and rural lanes. The townland covers 227 statute acres.

== History ==
In earlier times the townland was probably uninhabited as it consists mainly of bog and poor soils. It was not seized by the English during the Plantation of Ulster in 1610 or in the Cromwellian Settlement of the 1660s so some dispossessed Irish families moved there and began to clear and farm the land. By 1720 Morley Saunders, owned the land.

A deed dated 28 July 1720 between Morley Saunders and Richard Hassard spells the name as Caponagh and states the tenant of the townland was Tiernan Dolan.

The 1790 Cavan Carvaghs list spells the name as Cappanagh.

The Tithe Applotment Books for 1826 list ten tithepayers in the townland.

The Ordnance Survey Name Books for 1836 give the following description of the townland- The soil is a blue gravelly nature...there is plenty of limestone but it is not quarried nor used for any purpose whatever.

The Coppanaghbane Valuation Office Field books are available for July 1839.

Griffith's Valuation of 1857 lists nine landholders in the townland.

In the 19th century the landlords of Coppanaghbane were the Annesley and Hassard Estates.

== Census ==
Year	Population	Males	Females	Total Houses	Uninhabited
1841	73	32	41	12	1
1851	53	23	30	7	0
1861	35	17	18	8	2
1871	43	19	24	7	0
1881	48	19	29	8	2
1891	55	30	25	7	0

In the 1901 census of Ireland, there are nine families listed in the townland.

In the 1911 census of Ireland, there are six families listed in the townland.

== Antiquities ==
1. A stone sweathouse. The 'Archaeological Inventory of County Cavan' (Site no. 1859) describes it as- Not marked on OS 1836 or 1876 eds. Situated on a riverbank. Partly built into a hillside. Small beehive-shaped, circular (int. diam. 1.7m; H c. 2m), drystone-built structure roofed internally with small flat slabs. Low lintelled entrance at NE (H 0.65m; Wth 0.45m). Richardson (1939, 33-4) recorded 'two flues on the left of the door'.

Sweathouses between Blacklion and Dowra, County Cavan, by P. Richardson, in Ulster Journal of Archaeology, Third Series, Vol. 2 (1939), pp. 33–34.
