= Moherreagh =

Townland in the civil parish of Templeport, County Cavan, Ireland

Coordinates: 54.07514°N 7.810271°W

Moherreagh (from Irish Mothar Riach meaning - The Grey Thicket) is a townland in the civil parish of Templeport, County Cavan, Ireland. It lies in the Roman Catholic parish of Templeport and barony of Tullyhaw.

== Geography ==
Moherreagh is bounded on the north by Gub (Kinawley) townland, on the west by Gortmore townland, on the south by Moherloob and Mullaghlea townlands and on the east by Finaghoo townland. Its chief geographical features are 'The Meenymore Formation', in the stream between Finaghoo and Moherreagh townlands, a continuous succession of the highest part of the formation is exposed; forestry plantations; a stream; dug wells and spring wells. Moherreagh is traversed by minor roads and rural lanes. The townland covers 196 statute acres.

== History ==
In medieval times the McGovern barony of Tullyhaw was divided into economic taxation areas called ballibetoes, from the Irish Baile Biataigh (Anglicized as 'Ballybetagh'), meaning 'A Provisioner's Town or Settlement'. The original purpose was to enable the farmer, who controlled the baile, to provide hospitality for those who needed it, such as poor people and travellers. The ballybetagh was further divided into townlands farmed by individual families who paid a tribute or tax to the head of the ballybetagh, who in turn paid a similar tribute to the clan chief. The steward of the ballybetagh would have been the secular equivalent of the erenagh in charge of church lands. There were seven ballibetoes in the parish of Templeport. Moherreagh was located in the ballybetagh of "Bally Cloinelogh" (alias 'Bally Cloynelough'). The original Irish is Baile Cluain Loch, meaning 'The Town of the Lake Meadow')

The 1609 Ulster Plantation Baronial Map depicts the townland as part of Aghalough (Irish 'Achadh Locha' meaning "The Field of the Lake".

The 1652 Commonwealth Survey spells it as Agholagh.

The 1665 Down Survey map depicts it as Knocke, (from Irish Cnoc meaning ‘The Hill').

William Petty's 1685 map depicts it as Knock.

On 19 January 1586 Queen Elizabeth I of England granted a pardon (No. 4813) to Teig Oge M’Teig M’Tirlagh O Dollan of Aghholagh for fighting against the Queen's forces.

In the Plantation of Ulster by grant dated 24 February 1614, King James VI and I granted, inter alia, one pole of Moghereogh to Phelim McHugh O'Reyly, Bryan McHugh O'Reyly and Cahir McHugh O'Reyly, the sons of Hugh Reyly, late of Ballaghaneo, County Cavan. Ballaghaneo is now the townland of Ballaghanea in Lurgan Parish, County Cavan, on the shores of Lough Ramor, so the O'Reillys were removed a long way from their home by the Plantation. Hugh Reyly was the great-grandnephew of the chief of the O'Reilly clan, Eoghan na Fésóige mac Seoain, who ruled from 1418 to 1449. The O’Reilly lands in Moherreagh were confiscated in the Cromwellian Act for the Settlement of Ireland 1652 and were distributed as follows-

The 1652 Commonwealth Survey gives the proprietor as 'Thomas Worsopp' and the tenant as "William Lawther", both of whom appear in the Survey as owners of other townlands in Templeport.

In the Hearth Money Rolls compiled on 29 September 1663 there was one Hearth Tax payer in Moheragh- Ternan Magowran.

By grant dated 9 September 1669 King Charles II of England gave Arthur Annesley, 1st Earl of Anglesey, inter alia, the lands of Knock with an area of 56 acres 15 roods 1 perch.

A lease dated 31 January 1718 from Morley Saunders to John Enery of Bawnboy includes the lands of Moherre.

A lease dated 10 December 1774 from William Crookshank to John Enery of Bawnboy includes the lands of Moherre. A further deed by John Enery dated 13 December 1774 includes the lands of Moherae otherwise Moherevagh.

The 1790 Cavan Carvaghs list spells the name as Mogher, Reagh.

The Tithe Applotment Books for 1827 list twelve tithepayers in the townland.

The Moherreagh Valuation Office Field books are available for October 1839.

On 23 March 1850 The Incumbered Estates Commission sold part of the Hassard estate, including Moherreagh, on 29 April 1853 as follows-Sale of Incumbered Estates in Ireland, Notice to Claimants and Incumbrancers. In the Matter of the Estate of Francis Hassard, of Rockwood, in the County of Cavan, Owner, ex-parte William Thompson, Petitioner, Whereas, by an absolute Order, bearing date of the 23rd day of November, 1849, it was ordered, that the Lands of Rockwood, otherwise Tiercahan, situate in the Barony of Tullaha and County of Cavan; Gortnaleg, Upper and Lower, situate in same barony and county; Newtown, formerly part of Tiercahan, above-mentioned; Dunglave; Tonyquin; Gortmore; Gub, also called Gub Wallace; Maugherea, otherwise Moherre, otherwise Moherra; Finahoo; Cullion, otherwise Tawneanagra; All situate in the Barony of Tullaha and County of Cavan, should be sold for the purpose of discharging the incumbrances thereon. Now, all Persons claiming Estates or Interests on the said Premises, who may object to such Order are hereby informed that the Commissioners will hear any applications which any other person may desire to bring before them, on Notice, to be served at the Office, 14 Henrietta-Street, Dublin, within One Calendar Month from the date hereof. And all Persons claiming Charges or Incumbrances on the said Premises, or any part thereof, are required to lodge a brief statement of the Particulars thereof at the said Office, within two Calendar Months from the date hereof, and also to send their respective Addresses, in order that they may receive notice at what time and in what manner their claims should be established. Dated this 23rd day of March, 1850. S.Woulfe Flanagan, Secretary John Collum, Solicitor for the Petitioner, having the Carriage of the Sale--Offices, 70, Talbot-street. Dublin and Enniskillen.

The Incumbered Estates Commission sold part of the Hassard estate, including Moherreagh, on 29 April 1853 as follows- Final notice to Claimants. Incumbered Estates Commission. In the Matter of the estate of Francis Hassard, Esquire, Owner, Ex-parte Adam Thompson, Executor of William Thompson, Petitioner. Take Notice, that the Commissioners have Sold the Lands of Rockwood, otherwise Tiercahan (Lower), Tircahan (Upper), Gertaleg (Upper), Dunglave (part of), Tonyquin, Newtown, Gortmore, Cullion, otherwise Tawneanagra, Gub or Gub Wallace, Finagho, or Finahoo, and Magherea otherwise Mohers, situate in the Barony of Tullyhaw, and County of Cavan, And the Draft Schedule of Incumbrances being lodged in the Office of the General Clerk, if any person have a claim not therein inserted, or any objection to said Schedule, particularly in respect of the Deeds mentioned in the Schedule hereto, or any lien on the purchase money, a statement, duly verified, of the particulars of such claim, objection, or lien, must be lodged by such person in said Office, on or before the Fourteenth day of June next, and on the following Monday at the Hour of eleven o’Clock A.M., Mountifort Lougfield, L.L.D., one of the Commissioners, will give directions for the final settlement of said Schedule. And you are to take notice, that, within the time aforesaid, any person may file an objection to any demand reported to you in the Draft Schedule. Schedule referred to by the foregoing notice: -- Deed dated 2nd June, 1759, being a Mortgage For £1500 by John Enery to William Crookshank. Deed dated 7th May, 1760, being an annuity granted to one Francis Enery, until the consideration money, £2000, paid off. Deed dated 1st October, 1763, whereby a term of years was created to raise £3,000, which was subsequently appointed to one Catherine Enery. Deed dated 21st December, 1771, being a Mortgage for £1,975 16s., by John Enery to George Tandy. Dated 29th day of April, 1853 Henry Carey, Secretary. {seal} John Collum, Solicitor, having carriage of the proceedings, 70, Talbot-street, Dublin.

Griffith's Valuation of 1857 lists eleven landholders in the townland. The landlord of Moherreagh in 1857 was Robert Hutton.

A history of the O’Reillys of Moherreagh is viewable online at-

On 17 March 1943 a Royal Air Force Bristol Beaufighter JL710 crashed in Templeport Lake and one of the crew bailed out and landed safely in Moherreagh.

== Census ==
Year	Population	Males	Females	Total Houses	Uninhabited
1841	64	41	23	10	0
1851	51	31	20	9	2
1861	51	26	25	9	1
1871	55	30	25	10	0
1881	61	29	32	10	0
1891	47	21	26	9	2

In the 1901 census of Ireland, there are eight families listed in the townland, and in the 1911 census of Ireland, there are still eight families listed in the townland.

== Antiquities ==
The only structures of historical interest in the townland seem to be stepping stones over the stream.
