= Mullaghlea Glen =

Townland in County Cavan, Ireland

- Townland
- Etymology: The Glen of the Grey Hilltop
- Location in Ireland
- Coordinates: 54°10′33″N 7°55′29″W
- Country: Ireland
- County: County Cavan
- Civil Parish: Templeport

Population (1891)
  - Total: 21

Mullaghlea Glen (from Irish Gleann Mullach Liath meaning ‘The Glen of the Grey Hilltop'), is a townland in the civil parish of Templeport, County Cavan, Ireland. It lies in the Roman Catholic parish of Glangevlin and barony of Tullyhaw.

== Geography ==
Mullaghlea Glen is bounded on the north by Moneenabrone townland, on the west by Altnasheen, Carntullagh and Sranagarvanagh townlands, on the east by Carnmaclean townland and on the south by Altshallan townland. Its chief geographical features are mountain streams, waterfalls, forestry plantations and a spring well. The National Survey of Upland Habitats, (Site No. 13, Cuilcagh Mountain) states- Areas of particular botanical interest include the steep flushed banks and rockfaces in deep river valleys at Mullaghlea Glen. A number of new records of rare and threatened bryophytes were made during this survey. Primary among there were the vulnerable Bartramia (plant) ithyphylla, which was discovered growing on a flushed rockface in Mullaghlea Glen.

The townland is traversed by minor public roads and rural lanes. The townland covers 236 statute acres.

== History ==
In earlier times the townland was probably uninhabited as it consists mainly of bog and poor clay soils. It was not seized by the English during the Plantation of Ulster in 1610 or in the Cromwellian Settlement of the 1660s so some dispossessed Irish families moved there and began to clear and farm the land.

By 1720 Morley Saunders, was the owner of the townland.

By deed dated 24 December 1720 the aforesaid Morley Saunders leased the townland of Mullaughle, inter alia, to Thomas Enery of Bawnboy for a term of 41 years.

A deed by Thomas Enery dated 29 Jan 1735 includes the lands of Mullyle.

The Tithe Applotment Books for 1826 list four tithepayers in the townland.

The Ordnance Survey Name Books for 1836 give the following description of the townland- The soil is a blue gravelly nature...Lime stone can be procured in the beds of the streams, it is raised and used for building, but there none sold. A large stream runs along the west side of the townland but there is no remarkable object.

The Mullaghlea Glen Valuation Office Field books are available for July 1839.

Griffith's Valuation of 1857 lists fourteen landholders in the townland.

In the 19th century the landlords of Mullaghlea Glen was the Hassard Estate. In 1875 the Hassard Estate sold the townland to William Carson of Dowra.

== Census ==
Year	Population	Males	Females	Total Houses	Uninhabited
1841	48	22	26	12	2
1851	25	10	15	5	0
1861	30	13	17	5	0
1871	30	12	13	5	0
1881	23	9	14	5	0
1891	21	11	10	4	0

In the 1901 census of Ireland, there are five families listed in the townland.

In the 1911 census of Ireland, there are four families listed in the townland.

== Antiquities ==
1. Stone bridges over the river
