= Mullaghlea =

Townland in the civil parish of Templeport, County Cavan, Ireland

Coordinates: 54.07514°N 7.810271°W

Mullaghlea (from Irish Mullach Liath meaning ‘The Grey Hilltop') is a townland in the civil parish of Templeport, County Cavan, Ireland. It lies in the Roman Catholic parish of Templeport and barony of Tullyhaw.

== Geography ==
Mullaghlea is bounded on the north by Moherloob and Moherreagh townlands and Finaghoo townland in Swanlinbar parish, on the west by Gortullaghan, Tawnagh and Prospect, Corlough townlands, on the south by Brackley, Templeport townland and on the east by Mullanacre Upper townland in Tomregan parish. Its chief geographical features are Brackley Lough, Polldoo pothole (from Irish Poll Dubh meaning ‘The Black Hole'), sinkholes, forestry plantations, waterfalls, a stream and dug wells. It forms part of the Slieve Rushen Bog Natural Heritage Area. Mullaghlea is traversed by the national secondary N87 road (Ireland), minor roads and rural lanes. The townland covers 529 statute acres. A sub-division of the townland is 'The Baron's Field', named after Baron de Trent who lived in Brackley House in the 1850s.

== History ==
In medieval times the McGovern barony of Tullyhaw was divided into economic taxation areas called ballibetoes, from the Irish Baile Biataigh (Anglicized as 'Ballybetagh'), meaning 'A Provisioner's Town or Settlement'. The original purpose was to enable the farmer, who controlled the baile, to provide hospitality for those who needed it, such as poor people and travellers. The ballybetagh was further divided into townlands farmed by individual families who paid a tribute or tax to the head of the ballybetagh, who in turn paid a similar tribute to the clan chief. The steward of the ballybetagh would have been the secular equivalent of the erenagh in charge of church lands. There were seven ballibetoes in the parish of Templeport. Mullaghlea was located in the ballybetagh of "Balleagheboynagh" (alias 'Ballyoghnemoynagh'). The original Irish is Baile Na Muighe Eanach, meaning 'The Town of the Marshy Plain'). The ballybetagh was also called "Aghawenagh", the original Irish is Achadh an Bhuí Eanaigh, meaning 'The Field of the Yellow Bog').

The 1609 Ulster Plantation Baronial Map depicts the townland as part of Aghalough (Irish 'Achadh Locha' meaning "The Field of the Lake".

The 1652 Commonwealth Survey spells the name as Mullaghlyah.

The 1665 Down Survey map depicts it as Mullagh.

William Petty's 1685 map depicts it as Mullagh.

On 19 January 1586 Queen Elizabeth I of England granted a pardon (No. 4813) to Teig Oge M’Teig M’Tirlagh O Dollan of Aghholagh for fighting against the Queen's forces.

In the Plantation of Ulster by grant dated 26 June 1615, King James VI and I granted, inter alia, one poll in Aghalough to Sir George Graeme and Sir Richard Graeme to form part of the Manor of Greame. An Inquisition held at Cavan Town on 31 October 1627 found that George Greames was seized of one pole in Aghowlogh and he died 9 October 1624. By his will dated 1 May 1615 he left his lands to his son and heir William Greames, then 30 years old (born 1594) and unmarried.

The Grahams fought on the Irish side during the Irish Rebellion of 1641 and, as a result after the end of the war, the Cromwellian Act for the Settlement of Ireland 1652 confiscated their lands in Mullaghlea and distributed them as follows-

The 1652 Commonwealth Survey lists the proprietor as Mr Henry Pigott and the tenant as Caffeira O'Dolan.

In the Hearth Money Rolls compiled on 29 September 1663 there were four Hearth taxpayers in Mulaghlea- Farrell McBrien, Neale McEtire, Thomas McGawran and Ternan McKelaghcher.

By grant dated 9 September 1669 King Charles II of England gave Arthur Annesley, 1st Earl of Anglesey, inter alia, the lands of Mullaghleagh with an area of 51 acres at an annual rent of £0-13s-9d.

In a lease dated 24 Dec 1720, Morley Saunders leased to Thomas Enery, inter alia, the lands of Mullaugle.

A deed dated 13 Nov 1738 includes: Mullylea.

A deed dated 30 April 1740 by Thomas Enery includes: Mullahlea.

The Tithe Applotment Books for 1827 list twenty seven tithepayers in the townland.

The 1836 Ordnance Survey Namebooks state- There is a light soil intermixed with sand & lime stone (the latter of which is burned and used for manure).

An 1838 map of Mullaghlea is viewable online.

The Mullaghlea Valuation Office Field books are available for November 1839.

Griffith's Valuation of 1857 lists fifteen landholders in the townland.

== Mullaghlea Hedge-School ==
In the 'Second Report from the Commissioners of Irish Education Inquiry, 1826' there is a description of Mullaligh hedge-school. The teacher was a Roman Catholic, William Major, whose salary was £16 per annum. The schoolhouse was described as good and was valued at £100. There were 180 pupils, of which 90 were Roman Catholic and 90 were Church of Ireland. There were 130 boys and 50 girls on the roll. The school was supported by the Kildare Place Society (formally, The Society for Promoting the Education of the Poor in Ireland).

== Brackley School ==
The book Bawnboy and Templeport History Heritage Folklore, by Chris Maguire, gives the following description of Brackley school, which was actually located in the townland of Mullaghlea, not Brackley- Brackley National School 1826-1966: Teachers- Mrs. Mealiff ca. 1900; Miss Harkness 1903-'4; Robert Hall 1905-'7; Robert Smith 1907-'8; Mr. Close 1908-13; Maudie Kells 1913-14; Maud Stewart 1914-18; Isabella Hall 1918-20; Mrs. Foster 1921-29; Mrs. Coffey 1929-53; Miss Lattimer, short time; Miss Byers 1954-56; Mrs. Coffey 1 year; Miss Byers 1957-58; Mrs Knott 1958-1966 when Brackley School closed.

The roll number was 11,778. In 1890 there were 65 pupils.

A description by a schoolboy of Brackley School in the 1930s is viewable online.Water Under The Railway Bridge

== Census ==
Year	Population	Males	Females	Total Houses	Uninhabited
1841	70	36	34	7	0
1851	49	29	20	10	1
1861	45	22	23	9	1
1871	40	19	21	8	1
1881	37	20	17	8	1
1891	34	15	19	6	0

In the 1901 census of Ireland, there are ten families listed in the townland, and in the 1911 census of Ireland, there are only eight families listed in the townland.

== Antiquities ==
The chief structures of historical interest in the townland are

1. Toberpatrick (St.Patrick’s Holy Well) which was used as a place of pilgrimage until the 1890s.
2. A late Bronze Age penannular bronze bracelet.
3. A stone axehead
4. Brackley National School
5. Stepping stones over the stream
