= Finaghoo =

Townland in County Cavan, Ireland

Finaghoo (Irish derived place name Fionn Achadh, meaning 'The White Field’) is a townland in the civil parish of Kinawley, barony of Tullyhaw, County Cavan, Ireland.

== Geography ==
Finaghoo is bounded on the west by Gub (Kinawley) and Moherreagh townlands and on the east by Cullion (Kinawley), Mullaghlea and Mullanacre Upper townlands. It forms part of the Slieve Rushen Bog Natural Heritage Area. Its chief geographical features are Slieve Rushen mountain on whose western slope it lies, reaching a height of 1,238 feet; the Meenymore Formation, in the stream between Finaghoo and Moherreagh townlands a continuous succession of the highest part of the formation is exposed; Polldoo pothole (from Irish: Poll Dubh meaning ‘The Black Hole'). The 1938 Dúchas folklore collection states- A noise up in Pullamagulm is a sure sign of lots of rain; mountain streams; waterfalls; forestry plantations and dug wells. Finaghoo is traversed by minor public roads and rural lanes. The townland covers 283 statute acres.

== History ==
In medieval times Finaghoo was owned by the McGovern Clan and formed part of a ballybetagh spelled (variously) Aghycloony, Aghcloone, Nacloone, Naclone and Noclone (Irish derived place name Áth Chluain, meaning the ‘Ford of the Meadow’). The 1609 Baronial Map depicts the ballybetagh as Naclone.

In the Plantation of Ulster by grant dated 26 June 1615, King James VI and I granted, inter alia, The precinct or parcel of Nacloone otherwise Aghcloone to Sir George Graeme and Sir Richard Graeme to form part of the Manor of Greame. A history of Richard and George Graham is viewable online. The Grahams took part in the Irish Rebellion of 1641 and after the war their lands were confiscated under the Act for the Settlement of Ireland 1652.

The Tithe Applotment Books 1834 spell the name as Finagho.

The 1836 Ordnance Survey Namebooks state- the soil is bad, being reclaimed mountain and the crops very poor.

On 23 March 1850 The Incumbered Estates Commission sold part of the Hassard estate, including Finaghoo, on 29 April 1853 as follows-Sale of Incumbered Estates in Ireland, Notice to Claimants and Incumbrancers. In the Matter of the Estate of Francis Hassard, of Rockwood, in the County of Cavan, Owner, ex-parte William Thompson, Petitioner, Whereas, by an absolute Order, bearing date of the 23rd day of November, 1849, it was ordered, that the Lands of Rockwood, otherwise Tiercahan, situate in the Barony of Tullaha and County of Cavan; Gortnaleg, Upper and Lower, situate in same barony and county; Newtown, formerly part of Tiercahan, above-mentioned; Dunglave; Tonyquin; Gortmore; Gub, also called Gub Wallace; Maugherea, otherwise Moherre, otherwise Moherra; Finahoo; Cullion, otherwise Tawneanagra; All situate in the Barony of Tullaha and County of Cavan, should be sold for the purpose of discharging the incumbrances thereon. Now, all Persons claiming Estates or Interests on the said Premises, who may object to such Order are hereby informed that the Commissioners will hear any applications which any other person may desire to bring before them, on Notice, to be served at the Office, 14 Henrietta-Street, Dublin, within One Calendar Month from the date hereof. And all Persons claiming Charges or Incumbrances on the said Premises, or any part thereof, are required to lodge a brief statement of the Particulars thereof at the said Office, within two Calendar Months from the date hereof, and also to send their respective Addresses, in order that they may receive notice at what time and in what manner their claims should be established. Dated this 23rd day of March, 1850. S.Woulfe Flanagan, Secretary John Collum, Solicitor for the Petitioner, having the Carriage of the Sale--Offices, 70, Talbot-street. Dublin and Enniskillen.

The Incumbered Estates Commission sold part of the Hassard estate, including Finaghoo, on 29 April 1853 as follows- Final notice to Claimants. Incumbered Estates Commission. In the Matter of the estate of Francis Hassard, Esquire, Owner, Ex-parte Adam Thompson, Executor of William Thompson, Petitioner. Take Notice, that the Commissioners have Sold the Lands of Rockwood, otherwise Tiercahan (Lower), Tircahan (Upper), Gertaleg (Upper), Dunglave (part of), Tonyquin, Newtown, Gortmore, Cullion, otherwise Tawneanagra, Gub or Gub Wallace, Finagho, or Finahoo, and Magherea otherwise Mohers, situate in the Barony of Tullyhaw, and County of Cavan, And the Draft Schedule of Incumbrances being lodged in the Office of the General Clerk, if any person have a claim not therein inserted, or any objection to said Schedule, particularly in respect of the Deeds mentioned in the Schedule hereto, or any lien on the purchase money, a statement, duly verified, of the particulars of such claim, objection, or lien, must be lodged by such person in said Office, on or before the Fourteenth day of June next, and on the following Monday at the Hour of eleven o’Clock A.M., Mountifort Lougfield, L.L.D., one of the Commissioners, will give directions for the final settlement of said Schedule. And you are to take notice, that, within the time aforesaid, any person may file an objection to any demand reported to you in the Draft Schedule. Schedule referred to by the foregoing notice: -- Deed dated 2nd June, 1759, being a Mortgage For £1500 by John Enery to William Crookshank. Deed dated 7th May, 1760, being an annuity granted to one Francis Enery, until the consideration money, £2000, paid off. Deed dated 1st October, 1763, whereby a term of years was created to raise £3,000, which was subsequently appointed to one Catherine Enery. Deed dated 21st December, 1771, being a Mortgage for £1,975 16s., by John Enery to George Tandy. Dated 29th day of April, 1853 Henry Carey, Secretary. {seal} John Collum, Solicitor, having carriage of the proceedings, 70, Talbot-street, Dublin.

Griffith's Valuation of 1857 lists one landholder in the townland.

The landlords of Finaghoo in the 1850s was Robert Hutton.

== Census ==
Year	Population	Males	Females	Total Houses	Uninhabited
1841	24	13	11	5	1
1851	17	7	10	2	0
1861	18	7	11	4	0
1871	16	7	9	4	0
1881	18	8	10	4	0
1891	11	6	5	4	2

In the 1901 census of Ireland, there were three families listed in the townland.

In the 1911 census of Ireland, there was one family listed in the townland.

== Antiquities ==
Stone bridges over the streams
