= Drumcullion =

Townland in County Cavan, Ireland

Drumcullion (Irish derived place name, Droim Cuilinn, meaning 'The Ridge of the Holly') is a townland in the civil parish of Kinawley, barony of Tullyhaw, County Cavan, Ireland.

== Geography ==
Drumcullion is bounded on the north by Drumboory townland, on the west by Derryrealt and Gubrawully townlands and on the east by Drumcar (Kinawley) townland. Its chief geographical features are the hill which the townland is named after, reaching a height of 335 feet, mountain streams, forestry plantations, a spring well and dug wells. Drumcullion is traversed by minor public roads and rural lanes. The townland covers 86 statute acres.

== History ==
In medieval times Drumcullion was owned by the McGovern clan and formed part of a ballybetagh spelled (variously) Aghycloony, Aghcloone, Nacloone, Naclone and Noclone (Irish derived place name Áth Chluain, meaning ‘The Ford of the Meadow’). The 1609 Baronial Map depicts the ballybetagh as Naclone.

In the Plantation of Ulster by grant dated 26 June 1615, King James VI and I granted, inter alia, The precinct or parcel of Nacloone otherwise Aghcloone to Sir George Graeme and Sir Richard Graeme to form part of the Manor of Greame. The Grahams took part in the Irish Rebellion of 1641 and after the war their lands were confiscated under the Act for the Settlement of Ireland 1652.

The 1821 Census of Ireland spells the name as Drumcullen and states- containing 47 acres of arable land & 5 thereof bog. The Tithe Applotment Books 1834 spell the name as Drumcullin. Griffith's Valuation of 1857 lists eight landholders in the townland.

The landlord of Drumcullion in the 19th century was the Hassard Estate.

Folklore about Drumcullion is in the 1938 Dúchas collection.

== Census ==
Year	Population	Males	Females	Total Houses	Uninhabited
1841	46	23	23	7	0
1851	53	24	29	8	0
1861	51	26	25	7	0
1871	21	11	10	6	0
1881	28	17	11	6	0
1891	21	15	6	6	1

In the 1821 census of Ireland there were eight families listed in the townland.

In the 1901 census of Ireland, there were seven families listed in the townland.

In the 1911 census of Ireland, there were four families listed in the townland.

== Antiquities ==
1. A foot-bridge over the river
