= Mully Lower =

Townland in County Cavan, Ireland

Mully Lower, an Anglicisation of the Gaelic, ‘Mullach Íochtar’ meaning The Lower Summit of the Hill, is a townland in the civil parish of Templeport, County Cavan, Ireland. It lies in the Roman Catholic parish of Glangevlin and barony of Tullyhaw.

== Geography ==
Mully Lower is bounded on the north by Legnagrow townland, on the west by Curraghvah, Garvalt Lower and Moneenabrone townlands and on the east by Mully Upper townland. Its chief geographical features are the Owenmore River (County Cavan), mountain streams, forestry plantations, gravel pits and spring wells. The townland is traversed by the regional R206 road (Ireland), minor public roads and rural lanes. The townland covers 121 statute acres.

== History ==
The Tithe Applotment Books for 1826 list seven tithepayers in the townland.

The Ordnance Survey Name Books for 1836 give the following description of the townland- There is several good farm houses, in one of which resides a man of the name of Maguaran, who has long been reckoned famous for his cure of the bite of a mad dog.

The Mully Lower Valuation Office Field books are available for July 1839.

Griffith's Valuation of 1857 lists ten landholders in the townland.

The landlord of Mully Lower in the 19th century was Leonard Dobbin.

A typical tale of emigration from the townland in the 20th century involves the McGovern family.

== Census ==
Year	Population	Males	Females	Total Houses	Uninhabited
1841	43	20	23	6	0
1851	41	18	23	5	0
1861	33	16	17	6	0
1871	60	32	28	10	0
1881	42	21	21	6	0
1891	33	18	15	6	0

In the 1901 census of Ireland, there are seven families listed in the townland.

In the 1911 census of Ireland, there are seven families listed in the townland.

== Antiquities ==
1. A medieval earthen ringfort. The 'Archaeological Inventory of County Cavan' (Site No. 1025) describes it as- Raised circular area (int. diam. 27.7m) enclosed by a well-defined earthen bank best preserved at NW, and a partly waterlogged fosse encircled by a modern earth and stone bank from NW-N-E. Break in bank with remains of accompanying causeway at SE represents original entrance.
2. Stone bridges over the river.
3. Mully Lower School
4. A corn-kiln
