= Knockgorm =

Townland in County Cavan, Ireland

Knockgorm, an Anglicisation of the Gaelic 'Cnoc Gorm', meaning The Blue Hill (probably because the soil is light blue), is a townland in the civil parish of Templeport, County Cavan, Ireland. It lies in the Roman Catholic parish of Glangevlin and barony of Tullyhaw.

== Geography ==
Knockgorm is bounded on the north by Altshallan and Curraghglass townlands, on the east by Legatraghta townland and on the south by Slievenakilla townland. Its chief geographical features are the oligotrophic lakes- Munter Eolus Lough (Gaelic meaning The Descendants of Eolus) and Knockgorm Lough, mountain streams, waterfalls, forestry plantations and gravel pits. The townland is traversed by minor public roads and rural lanes. The townland covers 341 statute acres.

== History ==
In earlier times the townland was probably uninhabited as it consists mainly of bog and poor clay soils. It was not seized by the English during the Plantation of Ulster in 1610 or in the Cromwellian Settlement of the 1660s so some dispossessed Irish families moved there and began to clear and farm the land.

A deed by Thomas Enery dated 29 Jan 1735 includes the lands of Knockgorrum.

A deed by John Enery dated 13 December 1774 includes the lands of Knockgarrim otherwise Knockgarrin.

The 1790 Cavan Carvaghs list spells the name as Knockgorm.

The Tithe Applotment Books for 1826 list six tithepayers in the townland.

The Ordnance Survey Name Books for 1836 give the following description of the townland- Contains 351 acres, 319 of which are rough mountain pasture...lime stone can be procured but it is not quarried nor used in any way whatever.

The Knockgorm Valuation Office Field books are available for August 1839.

Griffith's Valuation of 1857 lists four landholders in the townland.

In the 19th century the landlord of Knockgorm was the Hassard Estate. In 1875 the Hassard Estate sold Knockgorm to James Bracken.

== Census ==
Year	Population	Males	Females	Total Houses	Uninhabited
1841	25	12	13	7	2
1851	27	13	14	4	0
1861	26	16	10	5	0
1871	22	12	10	4	0
1881	16	9	7	3	0
1891	21	10	11	3	0

In the 1901 census of Ireland, there are four families listed in the townland.

In the 1911 census of Ireland, there are three families listed in the townland.

== Antiquities ==
1. Stone bridges over the rivers
