= Moneenabrone =

Townland in County Cavan, Ireland

Moneenabrone, an Anglicisation of the Gaelic, ‘Moínín na Brón’, meaning The Little Bog of the Quern-stone, is a townland in the civil parish of Templeport, County Cavan, Ireland. It lies in the Roman Catholic parish of Glangevlin and barony of Tullyhaw.

== Geography ==
Moneenabrone is bounded on the north by Curraghvah townland, on the west by Altnasheen and Coppanaghmore townlands, on the south by Carnmaclean and Mullaghlea Glen townlands and on the east by Garvalt Lower and Mully Lower townlands. Its chief geographical features are mountain streams, forestry plantations, a gravel pit, waterfalls and spring wells. The townland is traversed by the regional R200 road (Ireland), minor public roads and rural lanes. The townland covers 137 statute acres.

== History ==
A deed by Thomas Enery dated 29 Jan 1735 includes the lands of Moneynebrone.

The 1790 Cavan Carvaghs list spells the name as Moneenbron.

The Tithe Applotment Books for 1826 list five tithepayers in the townland.

The Moneenabrone Valuation Office Field books are available for July 1839.

Griffith's Valuation of 1857 lists fourteen landholders in the townland.

A prosecution for illegal hunting dated 21 December 1874 now in the Cavan Archives Service (ref P017/0095) is described as- Summons in the matter of court case between Robert Warren Meade, 32 Fitzwilliam Square, Dublin, and Graves Chamney Colles, 38 Fitzwilliam Square, Dublin, esquires, plaintiffs, and Owen Magovern, Moneenabrone, County Cavan, farmer. Magovern is accused of coursing and killing hares with men, greyhounds and other dogs on lands possessed by the plaintiffs. Lands are described as the property of the Right Honourable Early of Annesley, parish of Templeport, barony of Tullyhunco, county Cavan, known as the Glan estate.

In the 19th century the landlord of Moneenabrone was the Hassard Estate. In 1875 the Hassard Estate sold Moneenabrone to William Carson.

== Census ==
Year	Population	Males	Females	Total Houses	Uninhabited
1841	47	19	28	8	0
1851	24	11	13	3	0
1861	28	14	14	4	0
1871	35	14	21	5	0
1881	35	14	21	5	0
1891	34	18	16	6	0

In the 1901 census of Ireland, there are six families listed in the townland.

In the 1911 census of Ireland, there are six families listed in the townland.

== Antiquities ==
1. A ford over the stream
