= Dunglave =

Townland in County Cavan, Ireland

Dunglave (Irish derived place name, either Dún gClaíomh, meaning 'The Fort of the Sword' or Dún gCliabh, meaning 'The Fort of the Creel' or Dún Mhig Laithimh, meaning 'The Fort of McGlave') is a townland in the civil parish of Kinawley, barony of Tullyhaw, County Cavan, Ireland.

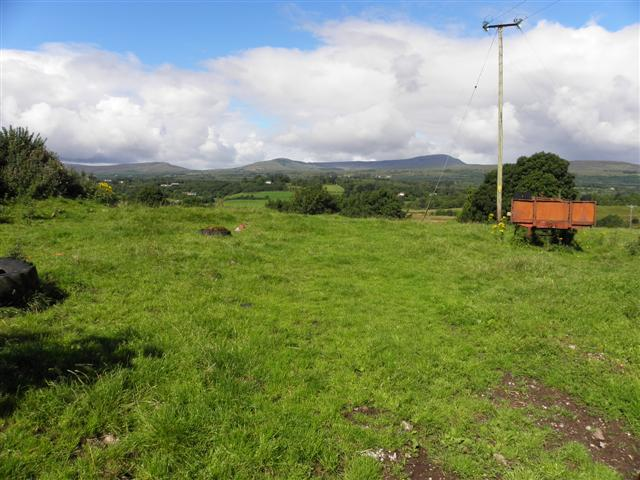
Dunglave Townland (geograph 3597251)

== Geography ==
Dunglave is bounded on the south by Gortmore townland, on the west by Derrynacreeve, Drumcanon (Kinawley), Gortlaunaght and Gortullaghan townlands and on the east by Gortnaleg and Gub (Kinawley) townlands. Its chief geographical features are the Blackwater river which later flows into the River Cladagh (Swanlinbar), a stone quarry, mountain streams, woods and a dug well. Dunglave is traversed by minor public roads and rural lanes. The townland covers 145 statute acres.

== History ==
Until the 19th century the present-day townland of Gub (Kinawley) formed part of Dunglave.

In medieval times Dunglave was owned by the McGovern Clan and formed part of a ballybetagh spelled (variously) Aghycloony, Aghcloone, Nacloone, Naclone and Noclone (Irish derived place name Áth Chluain, meaning 'The Ford of the Meadow'). The 1609 Baronial Map depicts the ballybetagh as Naclone.

In the Plantation of Ulster by grant dated 26 June 1615, King James VI and I granted, inter alia, The precinct or parcel of Nacloone otherwise Aghcloone to Sir George Graeme and Sir Richard Graeme to form part of the Manor of Greame. A history of Richard and George Graham is viewable online. The Grahams took part in the Irish Rebellion of 1641 and after the war their lands were confiscated under the Act for the Settlement of Ireland 1652 and distributed as follows-

The 1652 Commonwealth Survey spells the name as Doongliow and lists the proprietor as Mr Thomas Worshipp and the tenants as William Graham & others, so the Graham family were reduced to tenant status.

The 1665 Down Survey map of Tullyhaw depicts the townland as Downe Gleave.

William Petty's 1685 map depicts it as Down Glean.

In a deed dated 2 August 1714 Morley Saunders granted to Richard Hassard, inter alia, - the lands of Dungleave.

A deed by Thomas Enery dated 29 January 1735 includes the lands of Dungleave.

In a deed dated 13 August 1738 John Enery conveyed to Richard Hassard, inter alia, the lands of Dungleave.

A deed dated 13 December 1774 by John Enery spells the townland as Dungleave.

The 1790 Cavan Carvaghs List spells the name as Dunneglin.

The 1821 Census of Ireland spells the name as Dungleave.

Estate maps of 1831 spell the name as Dungleeve and lists the owner as Jason Hassard.

The Tithe Applotment Books 1834 spell the name as Dungleave.

The Dunglave Valuation Office Field books are available for June 1840.

On 23 March 1850 The Incumbered Estates Commission sold part of the Hassard estate in Dunglave on 29 April 1853 as follows-Sale of Incumbered Estates in Ireland, Notice to Claimants and Incumbrancers. In the Matter of the Estate of Francis Hassard, of Rockwood, in the County of Cavan, Owner, ex-parte William THOMPSON, Petitioner, Whereas, by an absolute Order, bearing date of the 23rd day of November 1849, it was ordered, that the Lands of Rockwood, otherwise Tiercahan, situate in the Barony of Tullaha and County of Cavan; Gortnaleg, Upper and Lower, situate in same barony and county; Newtown, formerly part of Tiercahan, above-mentioned; Dunglave; Tonyquin; Gortmore; Gub, also called Gub Wallace; Maugherea, otherwise Moherre, otherwise Moherra; Finahoo; Cullion, otherwise Tawneanagra; All situate in the Barony of Tullaha and County of Cavan, should be sold for the purpose of discharging the incumbrances thereon. Now, all Persons claiming Estates or Interests on the said Premises, who may object to such Order are hereby informed that the Commissioners will hear any applications which any other person may desire to bring before them, on Notice, to be served at the Office, 14 Henrietta-Street, Dublin, within One Calendar Month from the date hereof. And all Persons claiming Charges or Incumbrances on the said Premises, or any part thereof, are required to lodge a brief statement of the Particulars thereof at the said Office, within two Calendar Months from the date hereof, and also to send their respective Addresses, in order that they may receive notice at what time and in what manner their claims should be established. Dated this 23rd day of March 1850. S.Woulfe Flanagan, Secretary John Collum, Solicitor for the Petitioner, having the Carriage of the Sale--Offices, 70, Talbot-street. Dublin and Enniskillen.

The Incumbered Estates Commission sold part of the Hassard estate in Dunglave on 29 April 1853 as follows- Final notice to Claimants. Incumbered Estates Commission. In the Matter of the estate of Francis Hassard, Esquire, Owner, Ex-parte Adam Thompson, Executor of William Thompson, Petitioner. Take Notice, that the Commissioners have Sold the Lands of Rockwood, otherwise Tiercahan (Lower), Tircahan (Upper), Gertaleg (Upper), Dunglave (part of), Tonyquin, Newtown, Gortmore, Cullion, otherwise Tawneanagra, Gub or Gub Wallace, Finagho, or Finahoo, and Magherea otherwise Mohers, situate in the Barony of Tullyhaw, and County of Cavan, And the Draft Schedule of Incumbrances being lodged in the Office of the General Clerk, if any person have a claim not therein inserted, or any objection to said Schedule, particularly in respect of the Deeds mentioned in the Schedule hereto, or any lien on the purchase money, a statement, duly verified, of the particulars of such claim, objection, or lien, must be lodged by such person in said Office, on or before the Fourteenth day of June next, and on the following Monday at the Hour of eleven o'Clock A.M., Mountifort Lougfield, L.L.D., one of the Commissioners, will give directions for the final settlement of said Schedule. And you are to take notice, that, within the time aforesaid, any person may file an objection to any demand reported to you in the Draft Schedule. Schedule referred to by the foregoing notice: -- Deed dated 2 June 1759, being a Mortgage For £1500 by John Enery to William Crookshank. Deed dated 7 May 1760, being an annuity granted to one Francis Enery, until the consideration money, £2000, paid off. Deed dated 1 October 1763, whereby a term of years was created to raise £3,000, which was subsequently appointed to one Catherine Enery. Deed dated 21 December 1771, being a Mortgage for £1,975 16s., by John Enery to George Tandy. Dated 29th day of April 1853 Henry Carey, Secretary. {seal} John Collum, Solicitor, having carriage of the proceedings, 70, Talbot-street, Dublin.

Griffith's Valuation of 1857 lists eight landholders in the townland.

The landlords of Dunglave in the 19th century were the Hassard Estate and Frederick Elliott.

== Census ==
Year	Population	Males	Females	Total Houses	Uninhabited
1841	27	16	11	5	0
1851	27	13	14	5	0
1861	33	15	18	7	0
1871	25	11	14	5	0
1881	24	15	9	4	0
1891	27	16	11	4	0

In the Census of Ireland 1821, there were twenty-one families living in the townland.

In the 1901 census of Ireland, there were five families listed in the townland.

In the 1911 census of Ireland, there were two families listed in the townland.

== Antiquities ==
1. A stone bridge over the river
2. Dunglave 19th century hedge-school. The teacher was Hugh Magolrick who charged £0-2s-1d per pupil per quarter.
