= Altshallan =

Townland in County Cavan, Ireland

Coordinates: 54.170108°N 7.915984°W

Altshallan either Alt Sealáin, meaning The Gorge of the Water Channel or Alt Sealán meaning the Height of the Gallows (probably the former), is a townland in the civil parish of Templeport, County Cavan, Ireland. It lies in the Roman Catholic parish of Glangevlin and barony of Tullyhaw.

== Geography ==
Altshallon is bounded on the north by Carnmaclean townland, on the west by Carntullagh and Mullaghlea Glen townlands, on the east by Carrick West, Curraghglass and Knockgorm townlands and on the south by Slievenakilla townland. Its chief geographical features are Altshallan Lough (also called Loch na bFroganna meaning 'Lake of the Frogs'), the oligotrophic Lough Nambrack (Loch na mBreac meaning either the Speckled Lake or The Lake of the Trout), mountain streams, waterfalls, forestry plantations, rocky outcrops and spring wells. Altshallon is traversed by minor public roads and rural lanes. The townland covers 290 statute acres.

== History ==
In earlier times the townland was probably uninhabited as it consists mainly of bog and poor clay soils. It was not seized by the English during the Plantation of Ulster in 1610 or in the Cromwellian Settlement of the 1660s so some dispossessed Irish families moved there and began to clear and farm the land.

A deed by Thomas Enery dated 29 Jan 1735 includes the lands of Ardshallam.

A deed by John Enery dated 13 December 1774 includes the lands of Ardshellam in Glangevlin.

The 1790 Cavan Carvaghs list spells the name as Altshallan.

The Tithe Applotment Books for 1826 list four tithepayers in the townland.

The Ordnance Survey Name Books for 1836 give the following description of the townland- There is abundance of lime & freestone in the townland but they are not quarried nor used for any purpose whatever...There is a small lake on the east side and a large one on the south boundary.

The Altshallan Valuation Office Field books are available for August 1839.

Griffith's Valuation of 1857 lists twenty landholders in the townland.

In the 19th century the landlords of Altshallon were the Annesley and Hassard Estates. In 1875 the Hassard Estate was sold to James Bracken.

== Census ==
Year	Population	Males	Females	Total Houses	Uninhabited
1841	46	31	15	6	0
1851	40	24	16	6	0
1861	39	21	18	6	0
1871	40	24	16	6	0
1881	37	20	17	6	0
1891	40	22	18	6	0

In the 1901 census of Ireland, there are six families listed in the townland.

In the 1911 census of Ireland, there are seven families listed in the townland.
