= Drumboory =

Townland in County Cavan, Ireland

- Townland
- Location in Ireland
- Coordinates: 54°10′04″N 7°43′17″W
- Country: Ireland
- County: County Cavan
- Parish: Kinawley

Drumboory (Irish derived place name Droim Buaire, meaning ‘Ridge of the Cattle’) is a townland in the civil parish of Kinawley, barony of Tullyhaw, County Cavan, Ireland.

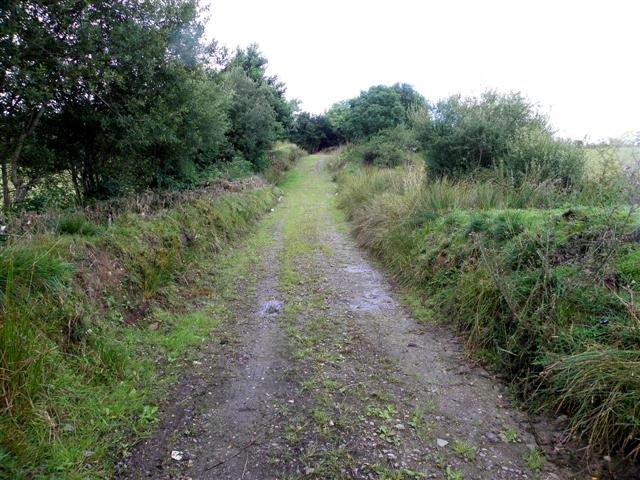
Lane, Drumboory (geograph 3597230)

== Geography ==
Drumboory is bounded on the south by Drumcar (Kinawley) townland, on the west by Derryrealt and Drumcullion townlands and on the east by Borim (Kinawley) and Drumcanon (Kinawley) townlands. Its chief geographical features are mountain streams, forestry plantations, a wood, spring wells and dug wells. Drumboory is traversed by the national secondary N87 road (Ireland), minor public roads and rural lanes. The townland covers 177 statute acres.

== History ==
In medieval times Drumboory was owned by the McGovern Clan and formed part of a ballybetagh spelled (variously) Aghycloony, Aghcloone, Nacloone, Naclone and Noclone (Irish derived place name Áth Chluain, meaning ‘The Ford of the Meadow’). The 1609 baronial map depicts the ballybetagh as Naclone.

In the Plantation of Ulster by grant dated 29 April 1611, along with other lands, King James VI and I granted one poll of Dromboory to Mulmore McTirlagh O'Reily, Gentleman. The said Maelmordha O'Reilly was related to chiefs of the O'Reilly clan, which is why he received a grant of land. His great-grandfather was Maolmhordha O'Reilly who was chief from 1537–1565. He was a grand-nephew of both Aodh Connallach O'Reilly who was chief from 1565–1583 and of Emonn O'Reilly who was chief from 1596-1601. He was a first cousin once-removed of Sean O'Reilly who was chief from 1583–1596. He was also a first cousin once-removed of Donill Backagh McShane O'Reyly who was also granted lands in Burren (townland) and of Cahell M'Owen O Reyly who received lands in Gowlagh South townland and of Cahir McOwen O'Reily, who received lands in Kildoagh townland.

In the Plantation of Ulster by grant dated 26 June 1615, King James VI and I granted, inter alia, The precinct or parcel of Nacloone otherwise Aghcloone to Sir George Graeme and Sir Richard Graeme to form part of the Manor of Greame, but the townland of Drombory already granted to the aforementioned Mulmore McTirlagh O'Reily was specifically excluded from this grant. However Sir Richard Graeme later bought the townland from Mulmore McTirlagh O'Reily, as an Inquisition held at Cavan Town on 31 October 1627 found that Sir Richard Greames of Corrasmongan died on 7 November 1625 seized of, inter alia, one poll of Drombarry. His son and heir Thomas Greames was aged 40 (born 1585) and married. A history of Richard and George Graham is viewable online. The Grahams took part in the Irish Rebellion of 1641 and their lands, including Drumboory, were confiscated after the rebellion and distributed as follows.

The 1652 Commonwealth Survey spells the townland as Dromboory, with the proprietor being Mr Henry Crafton and the tenants being Donogh Magwire & others. The townland then formed part of the Crofton estate until the late 19th century. The Crofton Estate papers are in the National Library of Ireland, MS 20,773-20,806 & D 26,886-27,010.

The 1790 Cavan Carvagh list spells the name as Drumbarry.

The 1821 Census of Ireland spells the name as Drumboory and states- containing 90 acres of arable land & 15 acres bog.

The 1825 Tithe Applotment Books spell the name as Drumboory.

The Drumboory Valuation Office Field books are available for November 1840.

Griffith's Valuation lists thirteen landholders in the townland.

== Census ==
Year	Population	Males	Females	Total Houses	Uninhabited
1841	81	42	39	11	0
1851	70	36	34	11	0
1861	47	25	22	9	0
1871	42	17	25	10	0
1881	42	20	22	9	0
1891	44	24	20	9	0

In the Census of Ireland 1821 there are twenty-seven families listed in the townland.

In the 1901 census of Ireland, there are fifteen families listed in the townland.

In the 1911 census of Ireland, there are ten families listed in the townland.

== Antiquities ==
1. A foot-bridge over the river
2. A graveyard. The 1938 Dúchas folklore collection states- There is an old graveyard in Drumboory-along Drumboory land. It is hundreds of years out of use as the tombstones have sunken down in the ground and are overgrown with moss and grass. It is round in shape and raised a bit in the centre. It is known as 'crocán' and slopes to the East North and South. There are a few old trees growing in the churchyard.
