= Derrynacreeve =

Townland in the civil parish of Templeport, County Cavan, Ireland

Coordinates: 54.155°N 7.718°W

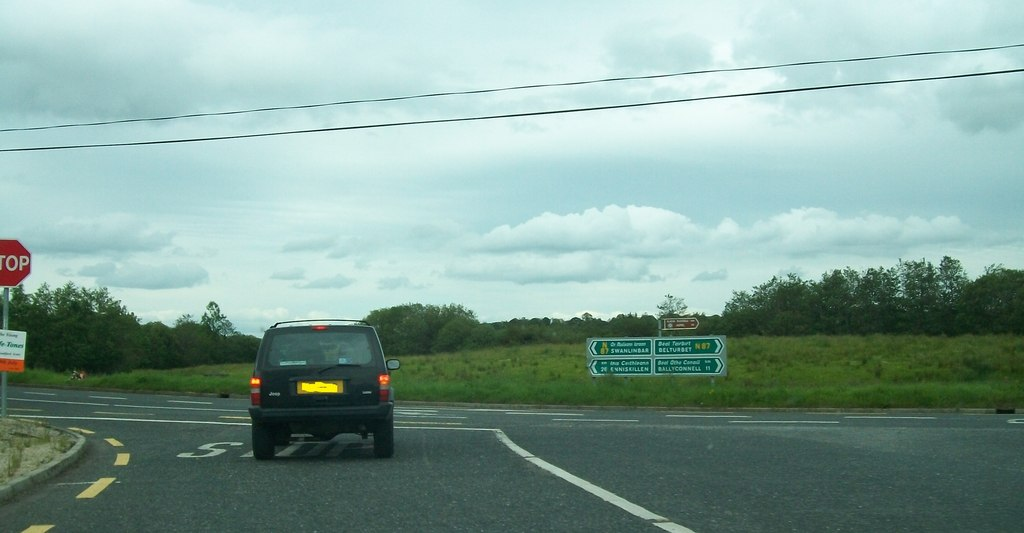
Road junction in Derrynacreeve

Derrynacreeve (from Irish Doire na Criadh meaning – The Oakwood of the Clay or Doire na Craoibhe meaning – The Oakwood of the Large Branching Tree) is a townland in the civil parish of Templeport, County Cavan, Ireland. It lies in the Roman Catholic parish of Corlough and barony of Tullyhaw.

== Geography ==
Derrynacreeve is bounded on the north by Drumcanon (Kinawley) and Drumcar (Kinawley) townlands, on the south by Tawnagh townland, on the west by Derryvahan townland and on the east by Gortullaghan and Dunglave townlands. Its chief geographical features are the Owensallagh river (A source of the River Blackwater, County Cavan), a stream, forestry plantations and dug wells. Derrynacreeve is traversed by the R202 road (Ireland), the R200 road (Ireland), the N87 road (Ireland) and rural lanes. The townland covers 122 statute acres.

== History ==
In medieval times the McGovern barony of Tullyhaw was divided into economic taxation areas called ballibetoes, from the Irish Baile Biataigh (Anglicized as 'Ballybetagh'), meaning 'A Provisioner's Town or Settlement'. The original purpose was to enable the farmer, who controlled the baile, to provide hospitality for those who needed it, such as poor people and travellers. The ballybetagh was further divided into townlands farmed by individual families who paid a tribute or tax to the head of the ballybetagh, who in turn paid a similar tribute to the clan chief. The steward of the ballybetagh would have been the secular equivalent of the erenagh in charge of church lands. There were seven ballibetoes in the parish of Templeport. Derrynacreeve was located in the ballybetagh of "Bally Cloinelogh" (alias 'Bally Cloynelough'). The original Irish is Baile Cluain Loch, meaning 'The Town of the Lake Meadow')

In the Plantation of Ulster by grant dated 27 February 1610, along with other lands, King James VI and I granted one poll of Dirrenekrett to William O'Shereden, gentleman, Cheefe of his Name. William Sheridan was the chief of the Sheridan Clan in County Cavan. He was the son of the previous chief, Hugh Duff O'Sheridan of Togher townland, Kilmore parish, County Cavan. William was the ancestor of the famous Sheridan theatrical family. William died sometime before 1638 leaving two sons, Owen (of Mullaghmore, Tullyhunco) and Patrick (of Raleagh townland, Kildallan parish). Owen Sheridan succeeded to his father's lands. Owen's son Denis was born in 1612 and became a Catholic priest in charge of Kildrumferton parish, County Cavan. He later converted to Protestantism and on 10 June 1634 William Bedell, the Protestant Bishop of Kilmore, ordained him as a Minister of the Church of Ireland and two days later Denis was collated to the Vicarage of Killasser in the Diocese of Kilmore. Denis had several children, including William Sheridan (Bishop of Kilmore and Ardagh) 1682–1691 (his son Donald kept up the Templeport connection by marrying Mrs Enery of Bawnboy); Patrick Sheridan, Cloyne, Protestant Bishop of Cloyne (1679–1682) and Sir Thomas Sheridan (politician) Chief Secretary of State for Ireland (1687–1688).

The Sheridan lands in Derrynacreeve were confiscated in the Cromwellian Act for the Settlement of Ireland 1652 and were distributed as follows:

The 1652 Commonwealth Survey lists the townland as Dirrenacrew and the proprietor as Lieutenant-Colonel Tristram Beresford.

The 1655 Down Survey map of Tullyhaw depicts the townland as Derrinecrew.

In the Hearth Money Rolls compiled on 29 September 1663 there was one Hearth Tax payer in - Dirinecre- Edmond McGawran.

A further confirming grant dated 3 November 1666 was made by King Charles II of England to the aforementioned Sir Tristram Beresford, 1st Baronet included, inter alia, 38 acres-1 rood-24 perches of unprofitable land in Derrenetrew or Derrenetrue. By grant dated 11 September 1670 from King Charles II of England to said Sir Tristram Beresford, the lands of Derrenetrew were included in the creation of a new Manor of Beresford.

A map of the townland drawn in 1813 is in the National Archives of Ireland, Beresford Estate Maps, depicts the townland as Derrynacreeve.

The Tithe Applotment Books for 1827 list five tithepayers in the townland.

The 1836 Ordnance Survey Namebooks state- The soil inclines to clay...a river likewise bounds it on the north.

The Derrynacreeve Valuation Office Field books are available for 1839–1840.

In 1841 the population of the townland was 60, being 29 males and 31 females. There were eleven houses in the townland, of which two were uninhabited.

In 1851 the population of the townland was 45, being 19 males and 26 females, the reduction being due to the Great Famine (Ireland). There were nine houses in the townland, all were inhabited.

Griffith's Valuation of 1857 lists nine landholders in the townland.

In 1861 the population of the townland was 54, being 23 males and 31 females. There were eight houses in the townland and all were inhabited.

In the 1901 census of Ireland, there are twelve families listed in the townland, and in the 1911 census of Ireland, there are thirteen families listed in the townland.

Folklore relating to Derrynacreeve is found in the 1938 Dúchas collection.

== Antiquities ==
1. Derrynacreeve 19th century Hedge-School
