= Gortmore =

Townland in County Cavan, Ireland

Coordinates: 54.07514°N 7.810271°W

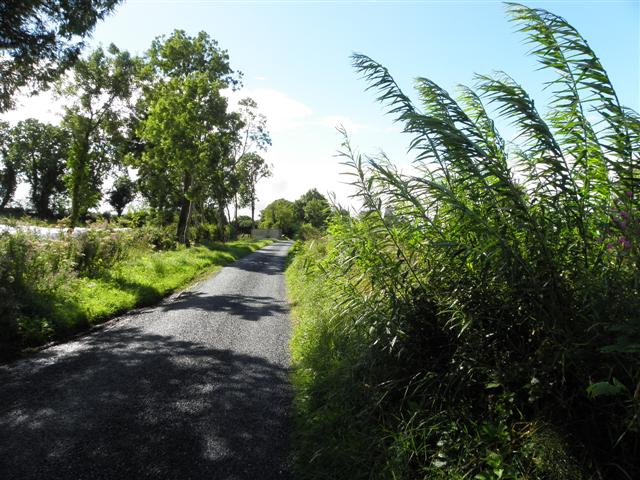
Road at Gortmore townland, heading south.

Gortmore (from Irish Gort Mór meaning A Big Field) is a townland in the civil parish of Templeport, County Cavan, Ireland. It lies in the Roman Catholic parish of Templeport and barony of Tullyhaw.

== Geography ==
Gortmore is bounded on the north by Dunglave and Gub (Kinawley) townlands, on the west by Gortullaghan townland, on the south by Moherloob townland and on the east by Moherreagh townland. Its chief geographical features are a stream, a stone quarry and dug wells. Gortmore is traversed by minor roads and rural lanes. The townland covers 113 statute acres.

== History ==
In medieval times the McGovern barony of Tullyhaw was divided into economic taxation areas called ballibetoes, from the Irish Baile Biataigh (Anglicized as 'Ballybetagh'), meaning 'A Provisioner's Town or Settlement'. The original purpose was to enable the farmer, who controlled the baile, to provide hospitality for those who needed it, such as poor people and travellers. The ballybetagh was further divided into townlands farmed by individual families who paid a tribute or tax to the head of the ballybetagh, who in turn paid a similar tribute to the clan chief. The steward of the ballybetagh would have been the secular equivalent of the erenagh in charge of church lands. There were seven ballibetoes in the parish of Templeport. Gortmore was located in the ballybetagh of "Balleagheboynagh" (alias 'Ballyoghnemoynagh'). The original Irish is Baile Na Muighe Eanach, meaning 'The Town of the Marshy Plain'). The ballybetagh was also called "Aghawenagh", the original Irish is Achadh an Bhuí Eanaigh, meaning 'The Field of the Yellow Bog').

The 1609 Ulster Plantation Baronial Map depicts the townland as Gortmore.

The 1652 Commonwealth Survey spells the name as Gortmore.

The 1665 Down Survey map depicts it as Gortmore.

William Petty's map of 1685 depicts it as Gortmore.

In the Plantation of Ulster by grant dated 26 June 1615, King James VI and I granted, inter alia, one poll in Gortmore to Sir George Graeme and Sir Richard Graeme to form part of the Manor of Greame. An Inquisition held at Cavan Town on 31 October 1627 found that George Greames was seized of one poll in Gortmore and he died 9 October 1624. By his will dated 1 May 1615 he left his lands to his son and heir William Greames then 30 years old (born 1594) and unmarried.

The Grahams fought on the Irish side during the Irish Rebellion of 1641 and, as a result after the end of the war, the Cromwellian Act for the Settlement of Ireland 1652 confiscated their lands in Gortmore and distributed them as follows-

The 1652 Commonwealth Survey lists the proprietor being Mr Thomas Worsopp and the tenant being William Lawther, both of whom appear as proprietor and tenant for several other Templeport townlands in the same survey.

In the Hearth Money Rolls compiled on 29 September 1663 there was one Hearth Tax payer in Cartmore- Mahon O Logan.

A lease dated 10 December 1774 from William Crookshank to John Enery of Bawnboy includes the lands of Gortmore, as does a further deed by John Enery dated 13 December 1774.

The 1790 Cavan Carvaghs list spells the name as Gortmore.

The Tithe Applotment Books for 1827 list eight tithepayers in the townland.

In 1833 one person in Gortmore was registered as a keeper of weapons- George Magauran.

The Gortmore Valuation Office Field books are available for October 1839.

On 23 March 1850 The Incumbered Estates Commission sold part of the Hassard estate, including Gortmore, on 29 April 1853 as follows-Sale of Incumbered Estates in Ireland, Notice to Claimants and Incumbrancers. In the Matter of the Estate of Francis Hassard, of Rockwood, in the County of Cavan, Owner, ex-parte William Thompson, Petitioner, Whereas, by an absolute Order, bearing date of the 23rd day of November, 1849, it was ordered, that the Lands of Rockwood, otherwise Tiercahan, situate in the Barony of Tullaha and County of Cavan; Gortnaleg, Upper and Lower, situate in same barony and county; Newtown, formerly part of Tiercahan, above-mentioned; Dunglave; Tonyquin; Gortmore; Gub, also called Gub Wallace; Maugherea, otherwise Moherre, otherwise Moherra; Finahoo; Cullion, otherwise Tawneanagra; All situate in the Barony of Tullaha and County of Cavan, should be sold for the purpose of discharging the incumbrances thereon. Now, all Persons claiming Estates or Interests on the said Premises, who may object to such Order are hereby informed that the Commissioners will hear any applications which any other person may desire to bring before them, on Notice, to be served at the Office, 14 Henrietta-Street, Dublin, within One Calendar Month from the date hereof. And all Persons claiming Charges or Incumbrances on the said Premises, or any part thereof, are required to lodge a brief statement of the Particulars thereof at the said Office, within two Calendar Months from the date hereof, and also to send their respective Addresses, in order that they may receive notice at what time and in what manner their claims should be established. Dated this 23rd day of March, 1850. S.Woulfe Flanagan, Secretary John Collum, Solicitor for the Petitioner, having the Carriage of the Sale--Offices, 70, Talbot-street. Dublin and Enniskillen.

The Incumbered Estates Commission sold part of the Hassard estate, including Gortmore, on 29 April 1853 as follows- Final notice to Claimants. Incumbered Estates Commission. In the Matter of the estate of Francis Hassard, Esquire, Owner, Ex-parte Adam Thompson, Executor of William Thompson, Petitioner. Take Notice, that the Commissioners have Sold the Lands of Rockwood, otherwise Tiercahan (Lower), Tircahan (Upper), Gertaleg (Upper), Dunglave (part of), Tonyquin, Newtown, Gortmore, Cullion, otherwise Tawneanagra, Gub or Gub Wallace, Finagho, or Finahoo, and Magherea otherwise Mohers, situate in the Barony of Tullyhaw, and County of Cavan, And the Draft Schedule of Incumbrances being lodged in the Office of the General Clerk, if any person have a claim not therein inserted, or any objection to said Schedule, particularly in respect of the Deeds mentioned in the Schedule hereto, or any lien on the purchase money, a statement, duly verified, of the particulars of such claim, objection, or lien, must be lodged by such person in said Office, on or before the Fourteenth day of June next, and on the following Monday at the Hour of eleven o’Clock A.M., Mountifort Lougfield, L.L.D., one of the Commissioners, will give directions for the final settlement of said Schedule. And you are to take notice, that, within the time aforesaid, any person may file an objection to any demand reported to you in the Draft Schedule. Schedule referred to by the foregoing notice: -- Deed dated 2nd June 1759, being a Mortgage For £1500 by John Enery to William Crookshank. Deed dated 7th May, 1760, being an annuity granted to one Francis Enery, until the consideration money, £2000, paid off. Deed dated 1st October, 1763, whereby a term of years was created to raise £3,000, which was subsequently appointed to one Catherine Enery. Deed dated 21st December, 1771, being a Mortgage for £1,975 16s., by John Enery to George Tandy. Dated 29th day of April, 1853 Henry Carey, Secretary. {seal} John Collum, Solicitor, having carriage of the proceedings, 70, Talbot-street, Dublin.

Griffith's Valuation of 1857 lists six landholders in the townland.

A distinguished native of the townland was Thomas McGovern (politician), M.P. for West Cavan in the House of Commons of the United Kingdom from 1900 to 1904.

== Census ==
| Year | Population | Males | Females | Total Houses | Uninhabited |
|---|---|---|---|---|---|
| 1841 | 65 | 36 | 29 | 11 | 0 |
| 1851 | 42 | 19 | 23 | 7 | 0 |
| 1861 | 36 | 19 | 17 | 6 | 0 |
| 1871 | 35 | 22 | 13 | 4 | 0 |
| 1881 | 30 | 17 | 13 | 5 | 0 |
| 1891 | 26 | 16 | 10 | 5 | 0 |

In the 1901 census of Ireland, there are ten families listed in the townland, and in the 1911 census of Ireland, there are only six families listed in the townland.

== Antiquities ==
1. An earthen ringfort.
