= Tullynacleigh =

Townland in County Cavan, Ireland

Tullynacleigh (from Irish Tulaigh na Cloiche meaning 'The Hill of the Stone’) is a townland in the civil parish of Templeport, County Cavan, Ireland. It lies in the Roman Catholic parish of Glangevlin and barony of Tullyhaw.

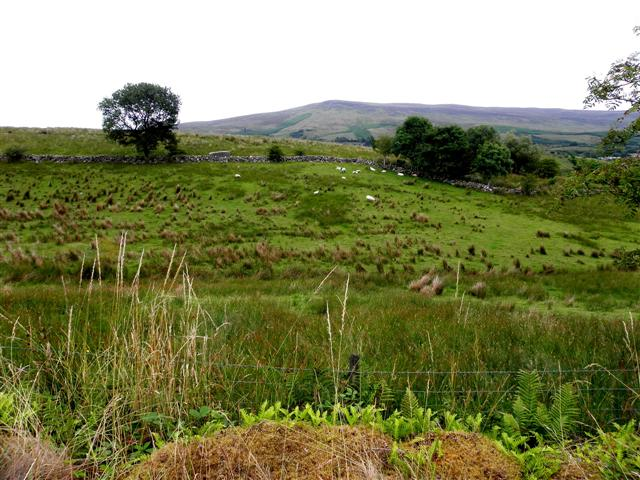
Tullynacleigh Townland (geograph 3586616)

== Geography ==
Tullynacleigh is bounded on the north by Garvalt Lower townland, on the east by Carrick West townland and on the west by Carnmaclean townland. Its chief geographical features are Tully Lough, mountain streams, forestry plantations and spring wells. The townland is traversed by the local L1016 road, minor public roads and rural lanes. The townland covers 58 statute acres. A subdivision of the townland was named Sheskinmore.

== History ==
In earlier times the townland was probably uninhabited as it consists mainly of bog and poor clay soils. It was not seized by the English during the Plantation of Ulster in 1610 or in the Cromwellian Settlement of the 1660s so some dispossessed Irish families moved there and began to clear and farm the land.

A deed by Thomas Enery dated 29 Jan 1735 includes the lands of Tullynecleff & Sheskinmore.

A deed dated 13 Nov 1738 includes: Tullynacleff and Sheskimmore.

The 1790 Cavan Carvaghs list spells the name as Tullonacloigh & Seskenmore.

The Ordnance Survey Name Books for 1836 give the following description of the townland- The soil is of a light blue gravelly nature. Freestone is interspersed through it, but is not raised nor used for any thing.

The Tullynacleigh Valuation Office Field books are available for August 1839.

Griffith's Valuation of 1857 lists two landholders in the townland.

In the 19th century the landlord of Tullynacleigh was the Annesley estate.

== Census ==
Year	Population	Males	Females	Total Houses	Uninhabited
1841	31	15	16	4	0
1851	19	11	8	2	1
1861	10	5	5	2	1
1871	7	3	4	1	0
1881	5	3	2	1	0
1891	5	2	3	1	0

In the 1901 census of Ireland, there was one family listed in the townland.

In the 1911 census of Ireland, there were no families living in the townland.

== Antiquities ==
1. Tullynacleigh National School was erected in the 1830s but in the late nineteenth century, the parish priest of Glangevlin, Father Thomas Corr, replaced Tullynacleigh school with a new one in Carrick West.
