= Drumcar (Kinawley) =

Townland in County Cavan, Ireland

- Townland
- Location in Ireland
- Coordinates: 54°09′33″N 7°43′30″W
- Country: Ireland
- County: County Cavan
- Parish: Kinawley

Drumcar (Irish derived place name, Droim Cairr, meaning 'The Ridge of the Rock') is a townland in the civil parish of Kinawley, barony of Tullyhaw, County Cavan, Ireland.

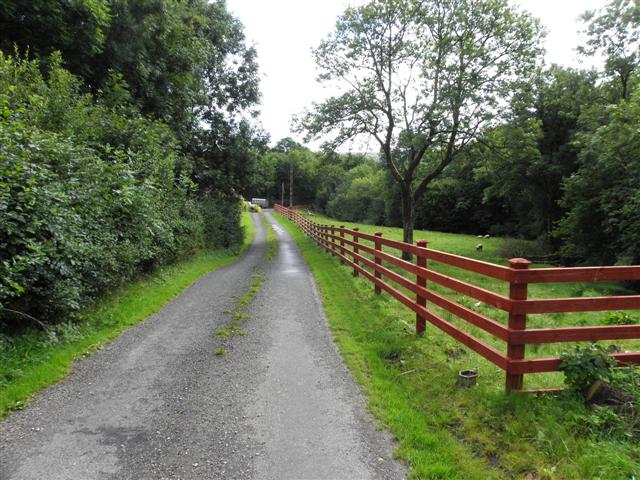
Road at Drumcar (geograph 3597216)

== Geography ==
Drumcar is bounded on the north by Drumboory and Drumcullion townlands, on the south by Derryvahan townland, on the west by Drumbeagh and Gubrawully townlands and on the east by Derrynacreeve and Drumcanon (Kinawley) townlands. Its chief geographical features are the Owensallagh river which later becomes the Blackwater river which later flows into the River Cladagh (Swanlinbar), mountain streams, forestry plantations and a dug well. Drumcar is traversed by the regional R200 road (Ireland), minor public roads and rural lanes. The townland covers 73 statute acres.

== History ==
In medieval times Drumcar was owned by the McGovern Clan and formed part of a ballybetagh spelled (variously) Aghycloony, Aghcloone, Nacloone, Naclone and Noclone (Irish derived place name Áth Chluain, meaning ‘The Ford of the Meadow’). The 1609 Baronial Map depicts the ballybetagh as Naclone.

In the Plantation of Ulster by grant dated 26 June 1615, King James VI and I granted, inter alia, The precinct or parcel of Nacloone otherwise Aghcloone to Sir George Graeme and Sir Richard Graeme to form part of the Manor of Greame. The Grahams took part in the Irish Rebellion of 1641 and after the war their lands were confiscated under the Act for the Settlement of Ireland 1652 and distributed as follows-

The 1652 Commonwealth Survey spells the townland as Dromchor and lists the proprietor as Mr Thomas Worshipp and the tenants as Edmond Magwire & others.

The 1655 Down Survey map of Tullyhaw depicts the townland as Carrick (No. 47).

The 1790 Cavan Carvaghs List spells the name as- Drumcorrigh.

Estate maps of 1831 spell the name as Drumcar and lists the owner as Hassard Esq.

The Tithe Applotment Books 1834 spell the name as Drumcar.

The Drumcar Valuation Office Field books are available for 1840.

Griffith's Valuation of 1857 lists nine landholders in the townland.

The landlords of Drumcanon in the 19th century were Patrick McManus and the Hassard Estate.

On Monday 13 November 1922 a young man, James Martin of Drumcar, was shot dead when his father’s home was raided by armed men. The family were saying the rosary when the armed men entered their house ordering the occupants to ‘put up their hands’, James refused and was shot dead.

== Census ==
Year	Population	Males	Females	Total Houses	Uninhabited
1841	40	18	22	6	0
1851	44	22	22	8	1
1861	20	9	11	4	0
1871	24	11	13	5	0
1881	16	8	8	4	0
1891	10	4	6	5	1

In the 1901 census of Ireland, there were four families listed in the townland.

In the 1911 census of Ireland, there were four families listed in the townland.

== Antiquities ==
1. Stone bridges over the river
2. A 19th century corn-mill, mill-pond, sluice, mill-race and corn-kiln. The owner was James Seales of Drumboory. Griffith's Valuation of 1857 states the tenant was James Howden, who leased it from the Hassard Estate. The mill was three stories high. Folklore about the mill is in the Dúchas collection.
3. Stepping-stones over the river.
