= Curraghglass =

Townland in County Cavan, Ireland

Curraghglass, an Anglicisation of the Gaelic, ‘Currach Glas’ meaning The Green Moor, is a townland in the civil parish of Templeport, County Cavan, Ireland. It lies in the Roman Catholic parish of Glangevlin and barony of Tullyhaw.

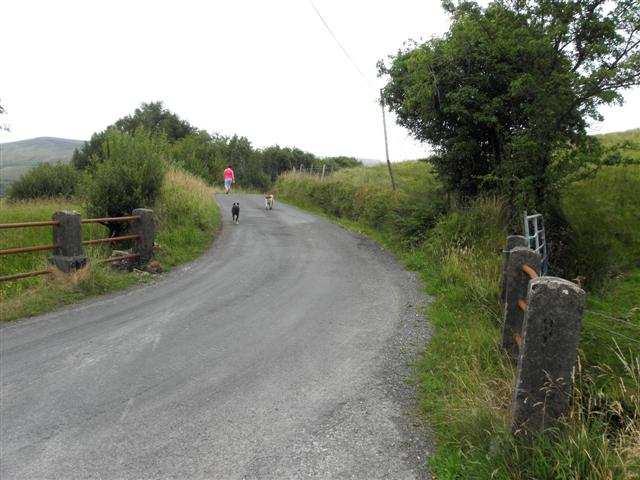
Road at Curraghglass (geograph 3586592)

== Geography ==
Curraghglass is bounded on the north by Garvalt Lower and Gub (Glangevlin) townlands, on the west by Altshallan, Carrick West and Knockgorm townlands, on the south by Legatraghta and Moneensauran townlands and on the east by Tullynacross (Glangevlin) townland. Its chief geographical features are the Owenmore River (County Cavan), mountain streams, waterfalls, gravel pits and spring wells. The townland is traversed by minor public roads and rural lanes. The townland covers 175 statute acres.

== History ==
In earlier times the townland was probably uninhabited as it consists mainly of bog and poor clay soils. It was not seized by the English during the Plantation of Ulster in 1610 or in the Cromwellian Settlement of the 1660s so some dispossessed Irish families moved there and began to clear and farm the land.

A deed by Thomas Enery dated 29 Jan 1735 includes the lands of Curraghaglass.

The 1790 Cavan Carvaghs list spells the name as Corglass.

The Tithe Applotment Books for 1826 list three tithepayers in the townland.

The 1836 Ordnance survey Name books state- The soil is of a light blue gravelly nature...two ancient forts, one near the south end and the other near the center of the townland.

The Curraghglass Valuation Office Field books are available for August 1839.

Griffith's Valuation of 1857 lists fifteen landholders in the townland.

== Census ==
Year	Population	Males	Females	Total Houses	Uninhabited
1841	77	42	35	14	0
1851	66	33	33	3	1
1861	69	30	39	14	1
1871	60	28	32	10	0
1881	50	24	26	8	0
1891	38	15	23	8	0

In the 1901 census of Ireland, there are six families listed in the townland.

In the 1911 census of Ireland, there are five families listed in the townland.

== Antiquities ==
1. A medieval earthen ringfort. The ‘Archaeological Survey of County Cavan’ (Site No. 491) describes it as- Raised circular area (int. diam. 26.6m) enclosed by a low earthen bank and traces of a fosse. Perimeter has been slightly modified and incorporated into the field boundary. Original entrance not recognisable.
2. A medieval earthen ringfort. The ‘Archaeological Survey of County Cavan’ (Site No. 492) describes it as- Raised circular area (int. diam. 24.7m) enclosed by a substantial earthen bank and remains of a fosse. Stone field boundary has been built against the outer face of the bank at south. Original entrance not recognisable. A small stone enclosure (probably modern) projects from the bank into the interior at north.
3. Stone bridges over the river.
4. Stepping-stones over the rivers.
5. A foot-bridge over the river.
