= Carrick West =

Townland in County Cavan, Ireland

Carrick West, (from Irish Carraig meaning 'A Rock’), is a townland in the civil parish of Templeport, County Cavan, Ireland. It is named Carrick West or Carrick Hassard to distinguish it from Carrick East or Carrick Fisher townland which is in Templeport parish. It lies in the Roman Catholic parish of Glangevlin and barony of Tullyhaw.

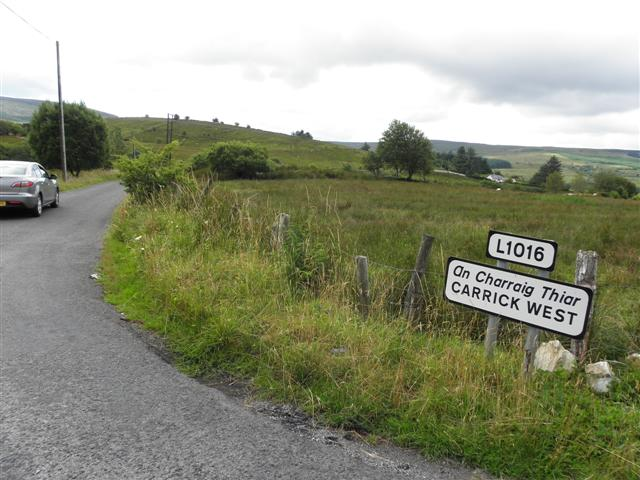
L1016, Carrick West (geograph 3586010)

== Geography ==
Carrick West is bounded on the north by Garvalt Lower townland, on the east by Curraghglass townland, on the west by Carnmaclean and Tullynacleigh townlands and on the south by Altshallan townland. Its chief geographical features are Tully Lough, mountain streams, waterfalls, forestry plantations, gravel pits and spring wells. The townland is traversed by the local L1016 road, minor public roads and rural lanes. The townland covers 158 statute acres.

== History ==
In earlier times the townland was probably uninhabited as it consists mainly of bog and poor clay soils. It was not seized by the English during the Plantation of Ulster in 1610 or in the Cromwellian Settlement of the 1660s so some dispossessed Irish families moved there and began to clear and farm the land.

A deed by Thomas Enery dated 29 Jan 1735 includes the lands of Carrick in Glan.

The 1790 Cavan Carvaghs list spells the townland name as Carrick.

The Tithe Applotment Books for 1826 list eleven tithepayers in the townland.

The Ordnance Survey Name Books for 1836 give the following description of the townland- There is a small lake and an ancient fort on its west side.

The Carrick West Valuation Office Field books are available for August 1839.

Griffith's Valuation of 1857 lists eight landholders in the townland.

In the 19th century the landlord of Carrick West was the Alex Hassard Estate. In 1875 it was sold to James Bracken.

== Census ==
Year	Population	Males	Females	Total Houses	Uninhabited
1841	50	24	26	8	0
1851	46	24	22	8	0
1861	44	23	21	7	0
1871	48	22	26	8	0
1881	47	22	25	8	0
1891	36	19	17	7	0

In the 1901 census of Ireland, there are eight families listed in the townland.

In the 1911 census of Ireland, there are ten families listed in the townland.

== Antiquities ==
1. A medieval earthen ringfort. Described in the 'Archaeological Inventory of County Cavan' (Site No. 301) as- Raised sub-rectangular area (int. dims. 24.8mNW-SE; 21m NE-SE) enclosed by two substantial earthen banks with intermediate wide, deep waterlogged fosse. Corresponding breaks in banks at NW with accompanying causeway represents original entrance.
2. Carrick National School. In the late nineteenth century, the parish priest of Glangevlin, Father Thomas Corr, replaced the old schools in Glangevlin by building new ones, including one in Carrick West. The school was closed in 1933 and was replaced by a new school in Curraghvah townland, which is still running.
