= Legatraghta =

Townland in County Cavan, Ireland

Legatraghta, an Anglicisation of the Gaelic ‘Lag an tSneachta’, meaning The Hollow of the Snow, is a townland in the civil parish of Templeport, County Cavan, Ireland. It lies in the Roman Catholic parish of Glangevlin and barony of Tullyhaw.

== Geography ==
Legatraghta is bounded on the north by Curraghglass townland, on the west by Knockgorm townland, on the east by Moneensauran townland and on the south by Slievenakilla townland. Its chief geographical features are the oligotrophic Munter Eolus Lough (Gaelic meaning The Descendants of Eolus), mountain streams, waterfalls, forestry plantations, a water sinkhole and a gravel pit. The townland is traversed by minor public roads and rural lanes. The townland covers 212 statute acres.

== History ==
In earlier times the townland was probably uninhabited as it consists mainly of bog and poor clay soils. It was not seized by the English during the Plantation of Ulster in 1610 or in the Cromwellian Settlement of the 1660s so some dispossessed Irish families moved there and began to clear and farm the land.

A deed dated 13 Nov 1738 includes: Legatraught.

The 1790 Cavan Carvaghs list spells the name as Legsnaght.

The Tithe Applotment Books for 1826 list four tithepayers in the townland.

The Ordnance Survey Name Books for 1836 give the following description of the townland- There is limestone and freestone in abundance in every part of the land but they are not quarried nor used for any purpose whatever. There are several good stone houses and a corn kiln on the east boundary of the townland.

The Legatraghta Valuation Office Field books are available for August 1839.

Griffith's Valuation of 1857 lists ten landholders in the townland.

In the 19th century the landlord of Legatraghta was the Annesley Estate.

== Census ==
Year	Population	Males	Females	Total Houses	Uninhabited
1841	46	25	21	9	2
1851	32	17	15	7	0
1861	38	16	22	9	1
1871	23	11	12	4	0
1881	23	11	12	5	2
1891	26	12	14	4	0

In the 1901 census of Ireland, there are six families listed in the townland.

In the 1911 census of Ireland, there are four families listed in the townland.

== Antiquities ==
1. Stone bridges over the rivers
2. A corn-kiln
3. Legatraghta National School, Roll No. 7856. In 1865: Terence Magauran was the headmaster, a Roman Catholic. There were 61 pupils, 31 boys and 30 girls, all Roman Catholic. The Catechism was taught to the Catholic pupils on weekdays from 3pm to 3:30pm and on Saturdays from 10:30am to 12:30. In 1874 there was one male teacher who received an annual salary of £21. There were 74 pupils, 35 boys and 39 girls. In 1890 there were 69 pupils in the school. In the late nineteenth century, the parish priest of Glangevlin, Father Thomas Corr, closed the school.
