= Altnasheen =

Townland in County Cavan, Ireland

Coordinates: 54°10′43.51″N 7°55′58.73″W

Altnasheen meaning either Alt na Sián, The Gorge of the Fairy Mounds or Alt na Sithin meaning the Height of the Fairies, is a townland in the civil parish of Templeport, County Cavan, Ireland. It lies in the Roman Catholic parish of Glangevlin and barony of Tullyhaw.

== Geography ==
Altnasheen is bounded on the north by Coppanaghmore and Moneenabrone townlands, on the west by Sranagarvanagh townland and on the south by Mullaghlea Glen townland. Its chief geographical features are Slievenakilla Mountain (on which eastern side it lies), mountain streams, waterfalls, forestry plantations, rocky outcrops and spring wells. Altnasheen is traversed by minor public roads and rural lanes. The townland covers 403 statute acres. A sub-division is called Carrignahasta (Carraig na Chasta meaning The Crag of the Turning).

== History ==
In earlier times the townland was probably uninhabited as it consists mainly of bog and poor clay soils. It was not seized by the English during the Plantation of Ulster in 1610 or in the Cromwellian Settlement of the 1660s, so some dispossessed Irish families moved there and began to clear and farm the land.

A deed by Thomas Enery dated 29 Jan 1735 includes the lands of Altneshein. The 1790 Cavan Carvaghs list spells the name as Altneshihen.

The Tithe Applotment Books for 1826 list five tithepayers in the townland. The Ordnance Survey Name Books for 1836 give the following description of the townland- The soil is of a blue gravelly mixture...There is plenty of limestone. It is raised and burned for building but there is none sold. There is nothing remarkable of any kind. The Altnasheen Valuation Office Field books are available for July 1839.

Griffith's Valuation of 1857 lists twenty-eight landholders in the townland. In the 19th century the landlords of Altnasheen were the Annesley and Hassard Estates. In 1875 the Hassard Estate was sold to William Carson of Dowra.

An account of growing up in Altnasheen in the 1890s by Mrs. Kathleen Sheehan (nee McGovern) is given in the Ulster Folklife Journal, Volume 31, Page 53. In 1921, the first year of Ardscoil Bhréifne, the Irish College in Glangevlin, the students and teachers spent a night at a céilí in the cottage of Patrick and Margaret McGovern of Altnasheen.

== Census ==
Year	Population	Males	Females	Total Houses	Uninhabited
1841	80	33	47	7	0
1851	73	31	39	11	0
1861	70	31	39	12	0
1871	63	32	31	13	0
1881	68	35	33	13	0
1891	76	39	37	11	0

In the 1901 census of Ireland, there are eleven families listed in the townland.

In the 1911 census of Ireland, there are ten families listed in the townland.

== Antiquities ==
1. A lime-kiln
2. Stepping stones over the river
