= Robert Saunders (Irish lawyer) =

Irish landowner, barrister and politician

Robert Saunders (c.1650–1708) was an Irish landowner, barrister and politician. He sat in the Irish House of Commons as MP for Cavan, and was the Irish Prime Serjeant-at-law. Unusually, his youngest son, Morley Saunders, also held the office of Prime Serjeant. Robert was one of the founders of the village of Swanlinbar, County Cavan, which is partially named after him, according to Jonathan Swift, who states that "an" represents the "aund" in "Saunders".

He was probably born in County Wexford. He was the second son of Colonel Robert Saunders and his wife Sarah Fitzherbert. His father had come to Ireland about the time of Robert's birth with Oliver Cromwell, with whom he is later said to have quarrelled. The elder Saunders became Governor of Kinsale, and received a grant of 3700 acres of land in Wexford. Despite his Cromwellian past, he supported the Restoration of Charles II (as did most Cromwellian settlers in Ireland) and was allowed to keep his lands under the new regime.

The younger Robert was elected MP for Cavan in 1692, and held the seat until his death. He was called to the Irish Bar and held the office of Prime Serjeant from 1703 to 1708. He went as an extra judge on assize in 1703. He is listed as one of the trustees of the King's Inns in 1706.

In 1682 he acquired from the Roman Catholic Hoveden family their substantial lands in County Laois at Tankardstown, Ballyleheane, and Clonpierce, which he held as a tenant of the Earl of Anglesey. During the political turbulence of the years 1688-90 the Hovedens, who now claimed that they had been wrongfully dispossessed because of their religion, briefly recovered the lands. Robert was back in possession by 1691: but the complex legal situation led to litigation between the Saunders, Hoveden, and Anglesey families which dragged on into the nineteenth century. Robert's will is dated 8 March 1707.

He had a daughter (who married Benjamin Fish) and three sons- Robert (died before 18 December 1732), Joseph (died 1713), and Morley (died 1737). Little is known about his wife, but her family name may have been Morley, as this became a common boy's name in the Saunders family. Robert's third son Morley followed him to the Irish Bar, and into the Irish House of Commons, and became Prime Serjeant in his turn. Morley inherited the family estate from his brother Joseph in 1713. He is best remembered for building the impressive family home, Saunders Grove, near Baltinglass, County Wicklow.

Jonathan Swift said that Robert ruined himself by investing in an ironworks at Swanlinbar, the village of which he was co-founder, (as did Swift's uncle Godwin Swift) but his losses seem to have been only temporary, as his sons inherited a comfortable estate. In his last will, he left all his property at Swanlinbar to Morley.
