= Morley Saunders =

Irish politician, barrister and landowner

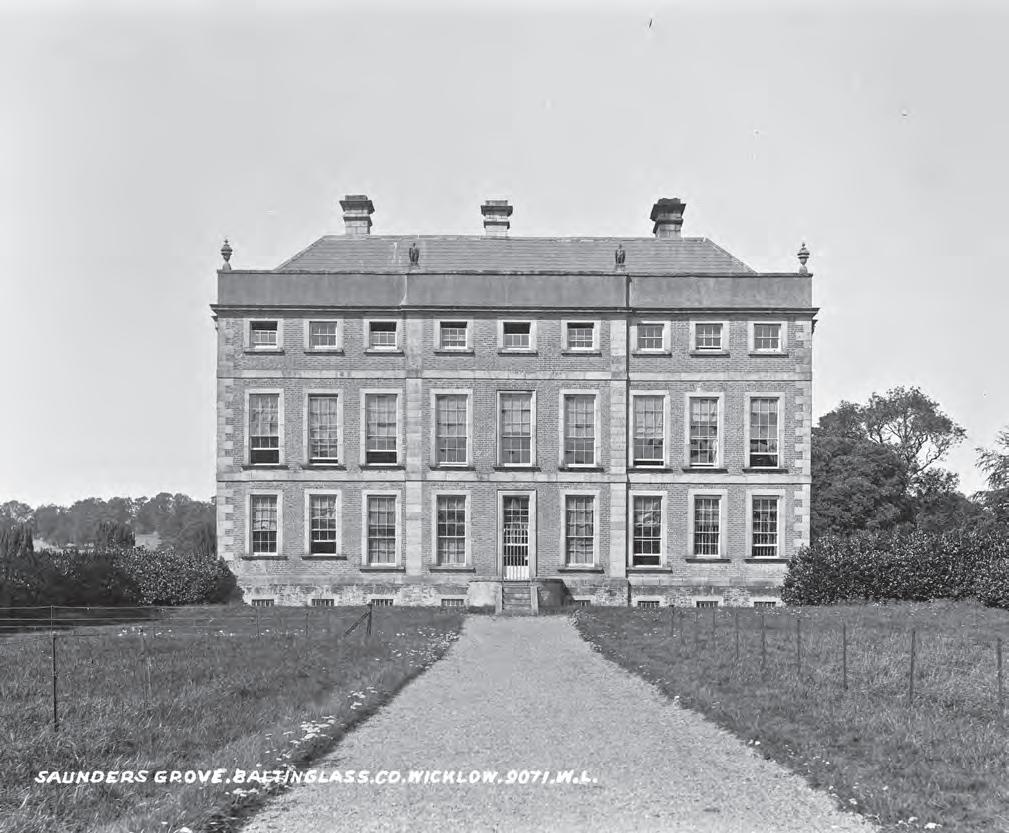
Saundersgrove, Baltinglass

Morley Saunders (1671-1737) was an Irish politician, barrister and landowner. He followed in his father's footsteps by becoming a member of the Irish House of Commons and Prime Serjeant-at-law. He is mainly remembered today as the builder of Saunders' Grove, the family home in Wicklow. The town of Swanlinbar, County Cavan, where he was a leading landowner, is partially named after his father.

== Early life ==
He was born in County Wexford, third son of Robert Saunders (died 1708), a wealthy lawyer and member of Parliament, who was Prime Serjeant 1703-1708; nothing seems to be known about his mother. Morley's grandfather, Colonel Robert Saunders, had been Governor of Kinsale during the Interregnum, but retained his substantial landholdings in Wexford after the Restoration of Charles II. Morley, unlike his grandfather, was described as a "passionate Tory". He had two elder brothers, Walter and Joseph, who died without issue. His father acquired substantial leasehold lands in County Laois, but his right to hold them was disputed by the Hoveden family, a dispute which involved his descendants in decades of litigation. According to Jonathan Swift, Robert lost a great deal of money by investing in an ironworks at Swanlinbar, the village of which he was co-founder, but his losses seem to have been only temporary, as the main family estate remained intact and he left a comfortable fortune to his sons.

== Career ==
Morley was called to the Bar, and sat in the Irish House of Commons as member for Enniscorthy from 1703 to 1714. He became Second Serjeant in 1711 and Prime Serjeant the next year. He acted as an extra judge of assize in 1713.

Irish judges and Law Officers did not at that time enjoy security of tenure, and they were invariably appointed on a party political basis. On the death of Queen Anne in August 1714, the new Whig Government in England took a dim view of the overwhelmingly Tory political establishment in Ireland, and Morley, like virtually all of his colleagues, was dismissed in a "clean sweep" of the Irish judges and Law Officers later in the year.

His loss of this very lucrative office was offset by his inheritance of the family estates from his brother Joseph, who died in 1713; he had already inherited the family estates at Swanlinbar in 1708 from his father. He spent much of his later years building a new family residence, Saunders' Grove near Baltinglass, County Wicklow. It has been described as a house of great beauty. Saunder's Grove remained in the family for several generations. The former Saunders estate is now a farm.

Morley died in 1737.

== Family ==
By his wife Frances Goodwin, he had a single daughter and heiress Cordelia, who married George Pendred (died 1741), younger son of William Pendred of Broghillstown, County Carlow and Elizabeth Champney. George was High Sheriff of Wicklow in 1735. He belonged to an old Northampton family which settled in Ireland in the time of William III of Orange. They had one daughter and three sons, of whom the eldest, the Reverend Morley Pendred Saunders, inherited the family estates from his grandfather, and at his request adopted the surname Saunders.
