= Monydoo =

Townland in County Cavan, Ireland

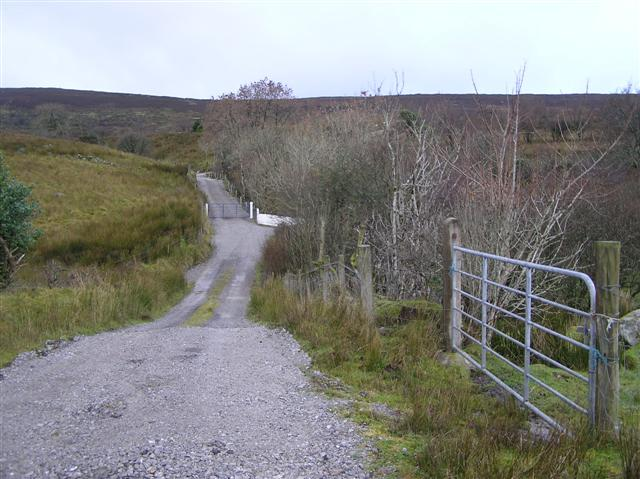
Monydoo

Monydoo (Irish derived place name, either Moinín Dhubh, meaning ‘The Little Black Bog’ or Muine Dhubh, meaning ‘The Black Shrubbery’) is a townland in the civil parish of Kinawley, barony of Tullyhaw, County Cavan, Ireland. It is also called Tonycrom (Irish derived place name, either Tamnach Crom, meaning ‘The Crooked Pasture’ or Tonnaí Chrom, meaning ‘The Sloping Marsh’).

== Geography ==
Monydoo is bounded on the south by Aghaboy (Kinawley) townland, on the west by Alteen and Commas (Kinawley) townland and on the east by Corranearty, Gorteennaglogh and Hawkswood townlands. Its chief geographical features are Cratty Peak (Gaelic- Cruite meaning- ‘The Hill Summit’) on Cuilcagh mountain which rises to 1,213 feet above sea level, Lough Cam (Gaelic meaning- ‘The Crooked Lake’), mountain streams, mountain pools, caverns, river swallowholes, forestry plantations, a wood, dug wells, spring wells and an iron spa well called Poll Magorm (Irish derived place name, Poll na Gorm, meaning ‘The Blue Hole’. According to the 1938 Dúchas folklore collection- It contains a well called Pollmagorm. It is said that anyone who puts his toes into the well will see blood on them when taken out. The old people say that anyone who crosses the well will never come back. One time a wedding party led by a fiddler crossed the well and went down into the fort. They never came back. Up to the present day the music of that fiddler is still heard from the fort. The fairies took all the wedding guests away with them and the fiddle still provides the music for the fairy feasts) The so-called ‘blood’ is the iron in the water. Monydoo is traversed by minor public roads and rural lanes. The townland covers 379 statute acres.

== History ==
In the 1609 Plantation of Ulster, Monydoo formed part of the mountain of Cuilcagh which were granted to John Sandford of Castle Doe, Co. Donegal (the father-in-law of Thomas Guyllym of Ballyconnell) by letters patent dated 7 July 1613 (Pat. 11 James I – LXXI – 38, ‘Quilkagh’). It was later sold by Sandford to his wife's uncle Toby Caulfeild, 1st Baron Caulfeild, Master of the Ordnance and Caulfield had the sale confirmed by letters patent of 12 July 1620 (Pat. 19 James I. XI. 45 ‘‘Quilkagh’’).

The 1821 census spells the townland as Tonnycrom, Tonnycrum and Tonneycream and states- containing 63 acres of arable land & 200 acres of black mountain.

The 1834 Tithe Applotment Books spell the name as Moneenduff.

The 1836 Ordnance Survey Namebooks state- The soil is very poor and light, being only reclaimed mountain, and the crops are in general bad.

The Monydoo Valuation Office Field books are available for 1838.

Griffith's Valuation lists eighteen landholders in the townland.

The landlord of Monydoo in the 19th century was the Gresson Estate.

== Census ==
| Year | Population | Males | Females | Total Houses | Uninhabited |
|---|---|---|---|---|---|
| 1841 | 103 | 52 | 51 | 22 | 0 |
| 1851 | 72 | 34 | 38 | 14 | 2 |
| 1861 | 44 | 22 | 22 | 8 | 0 |
| 1871 | 44 | 28 | 16 | 8 | 0 |
| 1881 | 44 | 28 | 16 | 8 | 1 |
| 1891 | 35 | 21 | 14 | 7 | 0 |

In the Census of Ireland 1821, there were nine families living in the townland.

In the 1901 census of Ireland, there were ten families listed in the townland.

In the 1911 census of Ireland, there were eleven families listed in the townland.

== Antiquities ==
1. Lime-kilns
2. A foot-bridge over the stream
3. Stepping-stones over the streams
4. Fords over the streams
