= Uragh (Kinawley) =

Townland in County Cavan, Ireland

Uragh (Irish derived place name, either Iubhrach, meaning ‘The Land of the Yew Trees’, or Úr Achadh, meaning ‘The Fresh Field’) is a townland in the civil parish of Kinawley, barony of Tullyhaw, County Cavan, Ireland.

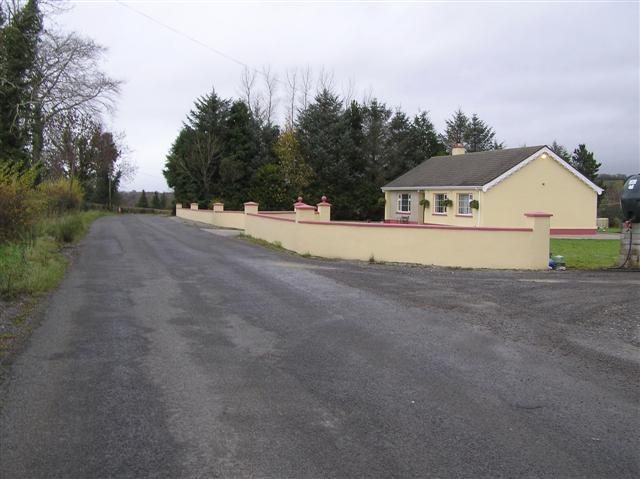
Road near Urlagh - geograph.org.uk - 1054727

== Geography ==
Uragh is bounded on the north by Drumconra (or Lowforge) townland, on the south by Drumbrughas and Drumod Glebe townlands, on the west by Furnaceland and Gortacashel townlands and on the east by Gortoral, Co. Fermanagh townland. Its chief geographical features are the River Cladagh (Swanlinbar), the Blackwater river which joins the River Cladagh in the townland, a wood and a sulphurous spa well (the 1938 Dúchas folklore collection states- There is a mineral well containing magnesia in the townland of Uragh in a field the property of Joseph Leonard, Uragh, Swanlinbar. A large hotel was at one time built close to it. The owner told me that the last of the stones of which it was built were removed 12 years ago (1926). There was a large graveled drive around the large field and even at present the outlines of this are visible. In one spot are the remains of an arch of trees. His grandfather told him that the trees supported a platform that could be raised by pulleys to their tops. This was used by the hotel guests for card playing, chess, etc. and the foliage of the trees provided the necessary shelter. Along the drive most of the trees had iron rings attached and to these the horses of daily callers were tied. This old man also told him that it was common said in the district that the hotel was much frequented by members of the Irish Parliament who came to Swanlinbar to drink the waters and that Dean Swift visited on more than one occasion. Mrs Bella McHugh, Swanlinbar who died aged 94 a few months ago (1938) told me that the building was a ruin for the past 100 years (since 1838). Uragh is traversed by minor public roads and rural lanes. The townland covers 148 statute acres.

== History ==
In medieval times Uragh was owned by the McGovern Clan and formed part of a ballybetagh spelled (variously) Aghycloony, Aghcloone, Nacloone, Naclone and Noclone (Irish derived place name Áth Chluain, meaning ‘The Ford of the Meadow’). The 1609 Baronial Map depicts the ballybetagh as Naclone.

In the Plantation of Ulster by grant dated 26 June 1615, King James VI and I granted, inter alia, The precinct or parcel of Nacloone otherwise Aghcloone to Sir George Graeme and Sir Richard Graeme to form part of the Manor of Greame. An Inquisition held at Cavan Town on 31 October 1627 found that Sir Richard Greames of Corrasmongan died on 7 November 1625 seized of, inter alia, one poll in Oughragh. His son and heir Thomas Greames was aged 40 (born 1585) and married. A history of Richard and George Graham is viewable online. The Grahams took part in the Irish Rebellion of 1641 and after the war their lands were confiscated under the Act for the Settlement of Ireland 1652.

The 1652 Commonwealth Survey spells the townland as Uragh with the proprietor being Mr Thomas Worshipp and the tenants being Edmond Magwire & others.

A deed dated 9 December 1710 From Ralph Darling and Adam Darling (the sons of Richard Darling, one of the founders of Swanlinbar town) assigned, inter alia, their lands of The two Uroghs to Peter Ward, a merchant of Dublin.

By deed dated 9 April 1711 the aforesaid Peter Ward assigned his interest under above deed of 9 December 1710 to Morley Saunders.

The 1790 Cavan Carvagh list spells the name as Uraghy.

The 1821 Census of Ireland spells the name as Ureaugh and Uereaugh and states- There is a spaw well the water of which is called the preserver of health.

The 1825 Tithe Applotment Books spell the name as Uragh Upper and Uragh Lower.

The Uragh Valuation Office Field books are available for 1838-1840.

Griffith's Valuation lists eleven landholders in the townland.

The landlord of Uragh in the 1850s was the Gresson Estate.

Folklore from Uragh is found in the 1938 Dúchas collection.

Uragh Boys' National School was actually situated in the adjoining townland of Gortacashel and Uragh Girls' National School was actually situated in the townland of Furnaceland.

== Census ==
Year	Population	Males	Females	Total Houses	Uninhabited
1841	45	23	22	8	0
1851	35	17	18	8	0
1861	43	20	23	10	2
1871	39	15	24	8	0
1881	32	14	18	8	1
1891	12	5	7	3	0

In the Census of Ireland 1821 there were six households in the townland.

In the 1901 census of Ireland, there were six families listed in the townland.

In the 1911 census of Ireland, there were four families listed in the townland.

== Antiquities ==
1. Long Bridge, built c. 1860 to replace an earlier one of 1750. The website www.buildingsof Ireland.ie states- Double-arch sandstone bridge, built c.1860, over River Blackwater, consisting of principal arch over the main channel to east and smaller arch over side channel to west surviving from an earlier structure of c.1750. Wide segmental arch to east with soffit and abutments of squared and coursed stone, regular rock-faced voussoirs having dressed arris to arch ring. Earlier round arch to west, with rubble stone soffit and abutments, arch ring of irregular roughly dressed voussoirs. Squared and coursed spandrel and parapet to eastern section, rubble stone spandrel and battered walls to west section. Variety of parapet copings with rubblestone to earlier section, rock-faced blocks to later section, and replacement rounded cement coping to centre. Wing walls angled to approach roads directions. Appraisal- A narrow bridge of robust character, demonstrating the evolution of bridge building construction from the eighteenth to the nineteenth century. The rebuilding of the main arch is typical of the arterial drainage projects carried out by the Board of Works throughout the country, with a particular concentration in Lakeland counties, whereby multiple channelled rivers were rationalised into a single deeper channel to improve land drainage.
2. A foot-bridge
