= Drumcask =

Townland in County Cavan, Ireland

Coordinates: 54°10′N 7°44′W

Drumcask (Irish derived place name Droim Cásca, meaning the ‘Ridge of Easter’) is a townland in the civil parish of Kinawley, barony of Tullyhaw, County Cavan, Ireland. It is close to the site of a medieval church in Killaghaduff townland, which might explain the meaning of the name.

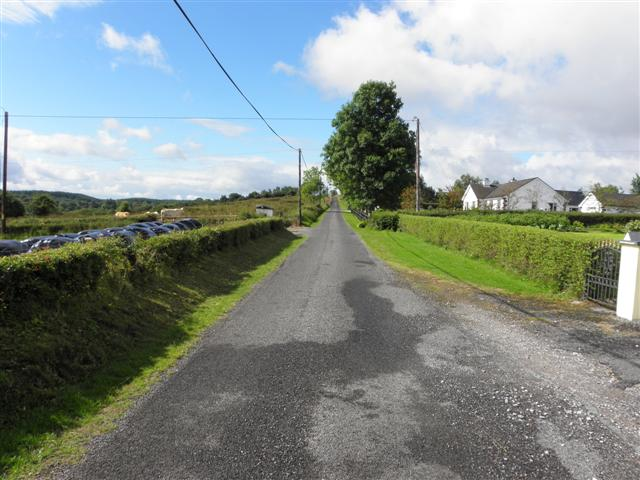
L1024, Drumcask (geograph 3597204)

== Geography ==
Drumcask is bounded on the north by Knockranny townland, on the west by Gubrawully, Knockroe (Kinawley) and Sralahan (Kinawley) townlands and on the east by Cornalon and Derryrealt townlands. Its chief geographical features are the River Cladagh (Swanlinbar), small rivulets, river islands, forestry plantations, a gravel pit, spring wells and dug wells. Drumcask is traversed by the local L1024 road, minor public roads and rural lanes. The townland covers 298 statute acres.

== History ==
In medieval times Drumcask was owned by the McGovern Clan and formed part of a ballybetagh spelled (variously) Aghycloony, Aghcloone, Nacloone, Naclone and Noclone (Irish derived place name Áth Chluain, meaning the ‘Ford of the Meadow’). The 1609 Baronial Map depicts the ballybetagh as Naclone.

In the Plantation of Ulster by grant dated 29 April 1611, along with other lands, King James VI and I granted one poll of Dromcaske to Mulmore McTirlagh O'Reily, Gentleman. The said Maelmordha O'Reilly was related to chiefs of the O'Reilly clan, which is why he received a grant of land. His great-grandfather was Maolmhordha O'Reilly who was chief from 1537–1565. He was a grand-nephew of both Aodh Connallach O'Reilly who was chief from 1565–1583 and of Emonn O'Reilly who was chief from 1596-1601. He was a first cousin once-removed of Sean O'Reilly who was chief from 1583–1596. He was also a first cousin once-removed of Donill Backagh McShane O'Reyly who was also granted lands in Burren (townland) and of Cahell M'Owen O Reyly who received lands in Gowlagh South townland and of Cahir McOwen O'Reily, who received lands in Kildoagh townland.

In the Plantation of Ulster by grant dated 26 June 1615, King James VI and I granted, inter alia, The precinct or parcel of Nacloone otherwise Aghcloone to Sir George Graeme and Sir Richard Graeme to form part of the Manor of Greame, but the townland of Dromkaske was specifically excluded from this grant. However Sir Richard Graeme later bought the townland from the aforementioned Mulmore McTirlagh O'Reily, as an Inquisition held at Cavan Town on 31 October 1627 found that Sir Richard Greames of Corrasmongan died on 7 November 1625 seized of, inter alia, one poll of Drimcaske. His son and heir Thomas Greames was aged 40 (born 1585) and married. A history of Richard and George Graham is viewable online. The Grahams took part in the Irish Rebellion of 1641 and their lands, including Drumcask, were confiscated after the rebellion and distributed as follows.

The 1652 Commonwealth Survey spells the townland as Dromcaiske with the proprietor being Mr Henry Crafton and the tenants being Donogh Magwire & others. The townland then formed part of the Crofton estate until the late 19th century. The Crofton Estate papers are in the National Library of Ireland, MS 20,773-20,806 & D 26,886-27,010. The 1790 Cavan Carvagh list spells the name as Dromcask. The 1825 Tithe Applotment Books spell the name as Drumcask. The Drucask Valuation Office Field books are available for August 1838. Griffith's Valuation lists twelve landholders in the townland.

== Census ==
Year	Population	Males	Females	Total Houses	Uninhabited
1841	115	59	56	20	0
1851	76	38	38	19	2
1861	103	57	46	18	0
1871	76	42	34	19	1
1881	72	41	31	16	1
1891	48	26	22	14	1

In the 1901 census of Ireland, there are fifteen families listed in the townland.

In the 1911 census of Ireland, there are seventeen families listed in the townland.

== Antiquities ==
1. Drumcask Post Office
2. Drumcask National School. The 1836 Ordnance Survey Namebooks state- There is a small school house in the north end of the townland established in 1831. Michael O'Hara was the teacher. He charged £0-0-10d per pupil per quarter.
