= Cornalon =

Townland in County Cavan, Ireland

Cornalon (Irish derived place name Corr na Lon, meaning ‘Round Hill of the Blackbirds’) is a townland in the civil parish of Kinawley, barony of Tullyhaw, County Cavan, Ireland.

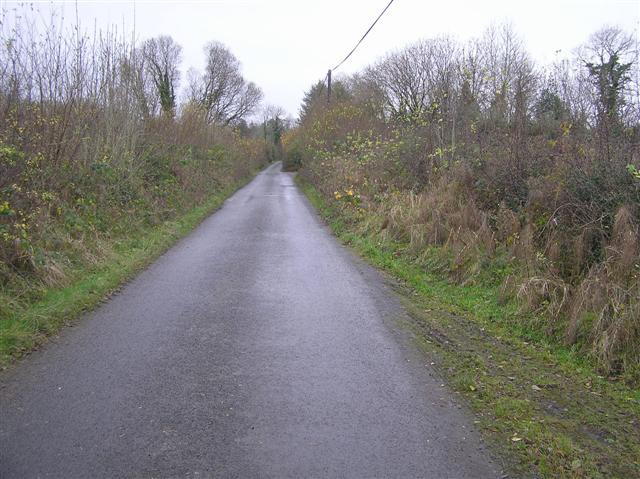
Road at Comalon - geograph.org.uk - 1054735

== Geography ==
Cornalon is bounded on the north by Gorteennaglogh townland, on the south by Derryrealt townland, on the west by Drumcask, Gubrimmaddera and Knockranny townlands and on the east by Furnaceland and Gorteen (Kinawley) townlands. Its chief geographical features are the hill after which the townland is named which reaches a height of 324 feet, the River Cladagh (Swanlinbar), small rivulets and dug wells. Cornalon is traversed by minor public roads and rural lanes. The townland covers 104 statute acres.

== History ==
In medieval times Cornalon was owned by the McGovern Clan and formed part of a ballybetagh spelled (variously) Aghycloony, Aghcloone, Nacloone, Naclone and Noclone (Irish derived place name Áth Chluain, meaning ‘The Ford of the Meadow’). The 1609 Baronial Map depicts the ballybetagh as Naclone.

The townland then formed part of the Crofton estate until the late 19th century. The Crofton Estate papers are in the National Library of Ireland, MS 20,773-20,806 & D 26,886-27,010.

The 1821 Census of Ireland spells the name as Cornalun and states- containing 70 acres arable land & 5 acres bog.

The 1825 Tithe Applotment Books spell the name as Cornalun.

The 1836 Ordnance Survey Namebooks state- lime is procured and is used for building & manure.

The Cornalon Valuation Office Field books are available for August 1838.

Griffith's Valuation lists five landholders in the townland.

Cornalon folklore is found in the 1938 Dúchas collection.

== Census ==
Year	Population	Males	Females	Total Houses	Uninhabited
1841	41	15	26	8	0
1851	43	25	18	8	0
1861	37	19	18	8	0
1871	27	15	12	6	1
1881	28	16	12	6	0
1891	23	8	15	5	0

In the Census of Ireland 1821 there are seventeen families listed in the townland.

In the 1901 census of Ireland, there are four families listed in the townland.

In the 1911 census of Ireland, there are four families listed in the townland.

== Antiquities ==
1. Stepping-stones over the river
