= Furnaceland =

Townland in County Cavan, Ireland

Furnaceland (English derived place name, meaning "field where the iron was smelted in the furnace") is a townland in the civil parish of Kinawley, barony of Tullyhaw, County Cavan, Ireland. The original Irish place name was Maghernavinagh, which in Irish was either Machaire Eanach, meaning "The Plain of the Marsh" or Machaire Mhianach, meaning "The Plain of the Mine"). The town of Swanlinbar is partially situated in Furnaceland.

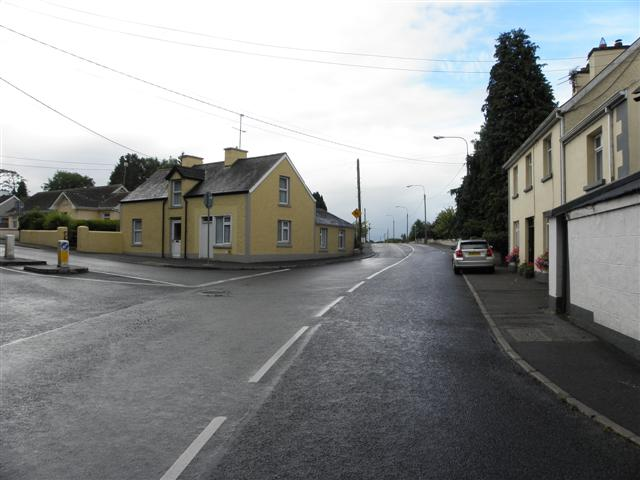
N87 Bawn Road, Swanlinbar (geograph 3595601)

== Geography ==
Furnaceland is bounded on the north by Hawkswood townland, on the south by Gorteen (Kinawley) and Killaghaduff townlands, on the west by Cornalon and Gorteennaglogh townlands and on the east by Drumconra (or Lowforge), Gortacashel and Uragh (Kinawley) townlands. Its chief geographical features are Furnaceland Hill, which reaches a height of 328 feet, the River Cladagh (Swanlinbar), the Blackwater river which later joins the Cladagh, a forestry plantation and dug wells, including the "Steel Well". Furnaceland is traversed by the national secondary N87 road (Ireland), the local L1031 road, minor public roads and rural lanes. The townland covers 365 statute acres.

== History ==
In medieval times Furnaceland was owned by the McGovern Clan and formed part of a ballybetagh spelled (variously) Aghycloony, Aghcloone, Nacloone, Naclone and Noclone (Irish derived place name Áth Chluain, meaning the "Ford of the Meadow"). The 1609 Baronial Map depicts the ballybetagh as Naclone.

In the Plantation of Ulster by grant dated 26 June 1615, King James VI and I granted, inter alia, The precinct or parcel of Nacloone otherwise Aghcloone to Sir George Graeme and Sir Richard Graeme to form part of the Manor of Greame. A history of Richard and George Graham is viewable online. The Grahams took part in the Irish Rebellion of 1641 and after the war their lands were confiscated under the Act for the Settlement of Ireland 1652.

The 1658 Down Survey map depicts the townland as Enean.

In 1766 Furnaceland was one of the first Methodist communities founded in County Cavan. A Methodist Pioneer: or the Life and Labours of John Smith by Charles Henry Crookshank (1885) states on page 196: In 1766, however, in connection with the zealous and faithful labours of John Smith, a large number of Societies were formed, including those at Mullalougher, Killashandra, Bawnboy, Belturbet, Cavanagh, Ballyconnell, Swanlinbar, Furnaceland and Gortnaleg. Crookshank describes how Smith felt a prompting to turn aside into the bridleway to Furnaceland, only to hear the voice of Satan shouting in his ear to turn back. Smith went on, and many were converted.

In the Fermanagh Poll of Electors 1788 there was one Furnaceland resident, Thomas McCleland, who was entitled to vote as he owned land in Cleenaghan townland in Magheracross parish.

The 1821 Census of Ireland spells the name as "Mearaveny or Furnish Land and Macraveny and Macreveny and Macreeveny" and states, "contains 148 acres of arable & pasture land & 15 acres of bog- there is also a church & burial ground on same".

The 1825 Tithe Applotment Books spell the name as Furnaceland and Maugheraveey.

The 1836 Ordnance Survey Namebooks state: In this land, the iron-works were carried on. There is the ruins of an iron foundary which has not been used these many years.

The Furnaceland Valuation Office Field books are available for 1838-1840.

Griffith's Valuation lists fifty-five landholders in the townland.

Folklore from Furnaceland is found in the 1938 Dúchas collection.

== Census ==
Year	Population	Males	Females	Total Houses	Uninhabited
1841	121	59	62	28	1
1851	122	47	75	25	0
1861	110	56	54	29	1
1871	151	68	83	33	0
1881	151	78	73	38	6
1891	41	23	18	10	0

In the Census of Ireland 1821 there were twenty-eight households in the townland.

In the 1901 census of Ireland, there were nine families listed in the townland outside of the town of Swanlinbar but there is a separate entry for the part lying in the town itself.

In the 1911 census of Ireland, there were ten families listed in the townland.

== Antiquities ==
1. A medieval earthen ringfort. The 'Archaeological Inventory of County Cavan' (Dublin: Stationery Office, 1995), Site no. 703, describes it as: Raised circular area (int. diam. c. 26m) enclosed by a slight external earthen bank with a deep internal waterlogged fosse. Inside the bank at north and running parallel to it is a short segment of earthen bank - possibly the remains of a hut site. Break in bank at north-east may represent original entrance. Site is overgrown with vegetation.
2. Long Bridge, built c. 1860 to replace an earlier one of 1750.
3. Methodist Manse House, built c. 1890 for the Methodist minister, on land donated by Richard Howe and sold for private use in the 1960s.
4. Swanlinbar St. Mary's GAA Club.
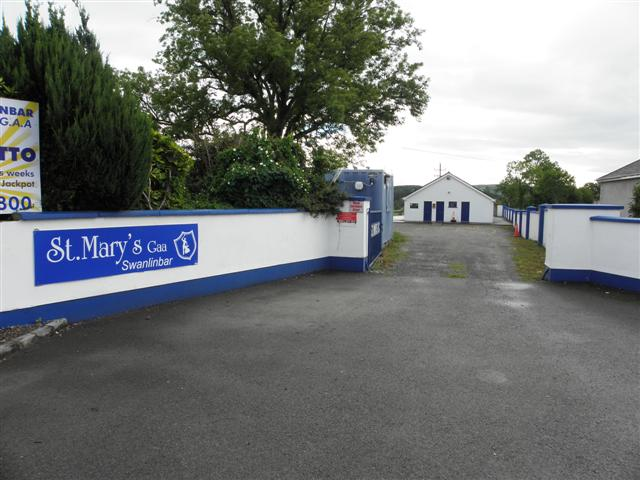
  St Marys GAA, Swanlinbar (geograph 3595616)
5. Foot-bridges over the Cladagh and Blackwater rivers.
6. A 19th century cattle-pound.
7. The ruins of Swanlinbar Iron Foundry, founded c. 1700. The history of this is found under the entry for Swanlinbar.
8. St. Augustine's Church of Ireland and Graveyard. It is the oldest building in Swanlinbar, opened on 19 June 1849, as a Chapel of Ease for the convenience of Swanlinbar residents living a distance from the parish church in Kinawley, replacing a thatched building which is shown on Taylor and Skinner's map drawn in summer 1777 and which is referred to in the 1821 census of Ireland as: Macraveny alias Furnishland contains 148 acres of arable & pasture land & 15 acres of bog- there is also a church & burial ground on same. The website www.buildings ofireland.ie describes the building as- Freestanding Gothic Revival Church of Ireland church, built 1849, comprising three-bay nave, three-stage entrance tower at west gable, and chancel to east elevation flanked by vestry lean-tos. Pitched slate roof with clay ridge tiles and cast-iron rainwater goods on iron brackets over projecting eaves course with stone brackets to ends, replacement uPVC rainwater goods to north. Sandstone walls to tower having ashlar finish to upper stages with battlemented parapet and octagonal capstones to corners. String courses marking tower stages with double lancet belfry openings to third stage having timber louvers and hood mouldings with label stops. Single lancets to middle stage. Set-back corners buttresses to ground level stage with coursed rubble sandstone to north elevation and stone shield over entrance with inscription, 'A.D 1849'. Ashlar sandstone to nave front elevation with sandstone string course in line with tower, north elevation having coursed rubble stone, all over bevelled plinth course of larger blocks. Setback corner buttresses with sloped weatherings to all elevations. Paired lancet windows to nave with chamfered sandstone surrounds and hood mouldings on label stops. Foiled triangular opening to apex of east gable, over chancel roof, having timber louvres and sandstone surround. Triple lancet stained glass east window flanked by wall buttresses with weathered gablets, single lancet windows with leaded glass to flanking lean-tos. Pointed arch door opening to south elevation of tower, with chamfered sandstone surround, hood moulding above stringcourse, recent double-leaf door and overlight. Narrower pointed arched doors to chancel lean-tos in similar chamfered surround having original timber double doors with four vertical panels and corresponding fixed timber overpanel. Interior having timber queen-post trusses on rounded braces rising from wall corbels, exposed rafters to nave and chancel. Timber flooring and wainscot to raised pew seating. Choir to east of nave with patterned geometric tiling, flanked by timber pews with pulpit to south and lectern to north. Chancel with patterned tiling and timber furniture. Gallery to rear with timber front of three cross-braced bays with chamfer-stop detail and pronounced cornice profile. Set back from road surrounded by graveyard, bounded by rubble stone walls having curved rubble stone wings flanking entrance with cast-iron double gates supported by ashlar piers. Appraisal- A handsome church designed by Joseph Welland (1798-1860) who in his capacity as architect to the Ecclesiastical Commissioners designed over one hundred churches across the country for the Church of Ireland. This building is well designed and executed and retains its historic form and character and much of its original fabric and interior fittings, including wall monuments of social and historical interest. The church is a key part of the social heritage of the area, and forms a striking landmark on the southern outskirts of the town.
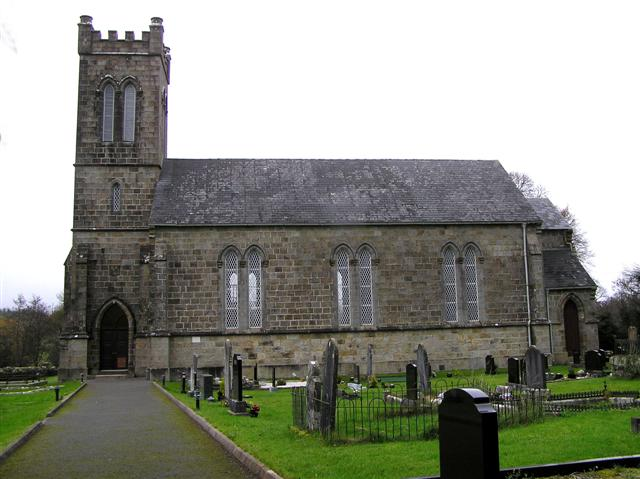
  St Augustine's Church of Ireland, Swanlinbar - geograph.org.uk - 1054612
9. Swanlinbar Church of Ireland rectory. Built c. 1863 and still occupied by the rector.
10. Swanlinbar Wesleyan Methodist Church, built c. 1800 and sold in 1997. The website www.buildings ofireland.ie describes the building as- Attached Georgian Gothic three-bay Methodist church, built c.1800, now disused. Pitched slate roof with clay ridge tiles, rendered chimneystack to south party-wall, recent concrete barge coping to north gable, replacement uPVC rainwater goods on uPVC fascia. Ruled-and-lined rendered walls. Pointed arch window and door openings to street front, having stone sills and multiple paned timber sash windows with switch-line tracery to upper sash. Timber double-leaf door in northern bay with switch-line tracery overlight. Two smaller pointed lancet windows to gable flanking altar with tilting Y-tracery opening light to head over six-pane fixed lights, now blocked up to the outside. Square-headed window to west, door opening to gable, now boarded up. Interior composed of two-bay nave to south having remnants of original furnishings. Set along street building line, raised above pavement level on sloping site. Appraisal- A building of understated simplicity, typical of churches built in rural areas in the early nineteenth century by the Methodist congregation. The church retains an elegant row of Georgian style pointed windows which are a key feature defining the architectural character of the main street of Swanlinbar. The church was closed in the 1960s due to the declining Methodist population and together with the former Manse serves as a reminder of the former religious diversity in this part of the county.
11. Ben View Primitive Methodist Church, now a private residence.
12. Trivia House, Swanlinbar.
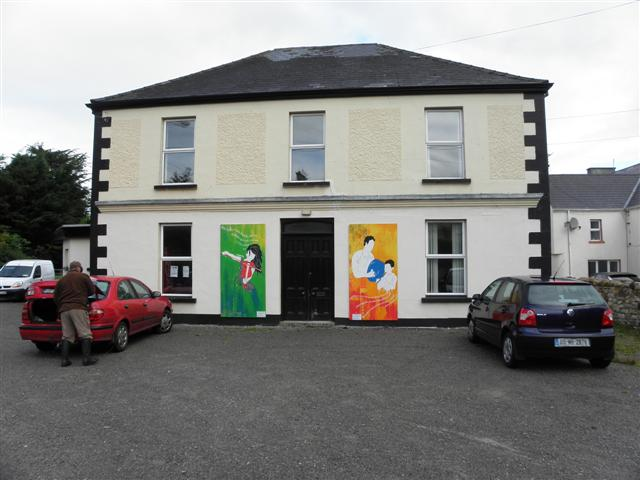
  Trivia House, Swanlinbar (geograph 3595608)
13. Royal Irish Constabulary Barracks.
14. Swanlinbar Creamery.
15. Swanlinbar Court House.
16. Swanlinbar Fair Green. The 1836 Ordnance Survey map locates this in the adjoining townland of Hawkswood but the townland boundary was moved northwards to include the Fair Green in the 1913 edition.
17. Swanlinbar Protestant Primary School, Roll Number 9,268. In 1865 the teacher, an Anglican, received an annual salary of £23-0s-0d. There were 65 pupils, all girls. In 1874 the teacher, an Anglican, received an annual salary of £24-0s-0d. There were 105 pupils, 30 boys and 75 girls. In 1886 the teacher, an Anglican, received an annual salary of £30-18s-2d. There were 70 pupils, 31 boys and 39 girls. Folklore was collected in the school in the Dúchas collection of 1938.
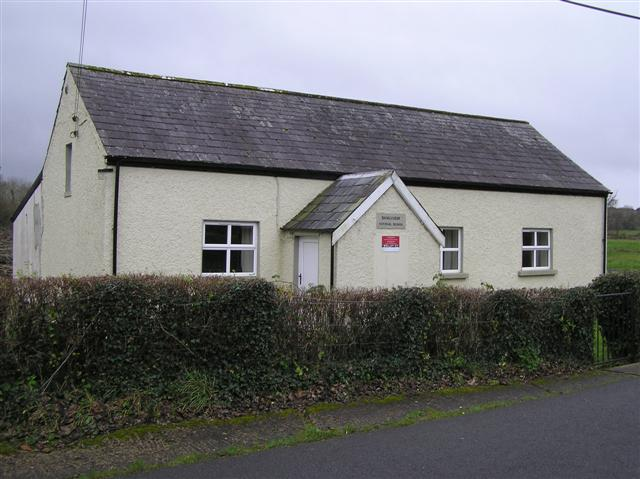
  Swanlinbar National School - geograph.org.uk - 1054611
18. Uragh Girls' National School, Roll No. 8,189. This was situated in Furnaceland, not in Uragh townland (Uragh Boys' School was situated in Gortacashel townland not in Uragh townland). In 1862 the headmistress of the girls’ school was Anne Kierans, a Roman Catholic. There were 89 girls in the school, 30 were Church of Ireland and 59 were Roman Catholic. The Catholic pupils were taught the Roman Catholic Catechism on Saturdays from 11am to 12 noon. In 1865 the teacher, a Roman Catholic, received an annual salary of £26-8s-10d. There were 84 girls. In 1874 the teacher, a Roman Catholic, received an annual salary of £35-3s-4d. There were 93 girls. In 1886 the teacher, a Roman Catholic, received an annual salary of £62-13s-6d. There were 75 girls. In 1890 there were 97 girls at the school. Folklore was collected at the school in the 1938 Dúchas collection. The collection gives a list of the Girls’ School teachers up until 1938- 1. Mrs Anna Ryan (40 years service), 2. Mrs Margaret McBarron, 3. Miss Mary B. McCullagh, 4. Miss Elizabeth G. McCaffery.
19. Scoil Mhuire Swanlinbar National school.
