= Sralahan (Kinawley) =

Townland in County Cavan, Ireland

Sralahan (Irish derived place name Srath Leathan, meaning ‘The Broad River-Meadow') is a townland in the civil parish of Kinawley, barony of Tullyhaw, County Cavan, Ireland.

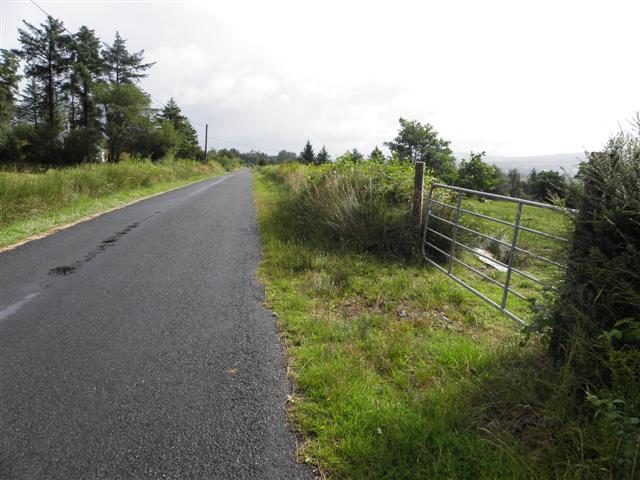
Road at Sralahan (geograph 3596765)

== Geography ==
Sralahan is bounded on the north by Knockroe (Kinawley) townland, on the west by Altbrean and Tullydermot townlands and on the east by Drumcask and Gubrawully townlands. Its chief geographical features are the River Cladagh (Swanlinbar), mountain streams, a dug well and islands in the river. Sralahan is traversed by the L1019 local road, minor public roads and rural lanes. The townland covers 132 statute acres.

== History ==
In the Cavan Poll Book of 1761, there was one person registered to vote in Sralahan in the Irish general election, 1761 - Thomas Cosby esquire of Curkish. He was entitled to cast two votes. The four election candidates were Charles Coote, 1st Earl of Bellomont and Lord Newtownbutler (later Brinsley Butler, 2nd Earl of Lanesborough), both of whom were then elected Member of Parliament for Cavan County. The losing candidates were George Montgomery (MP) of Ballyconnell and Barry Maxwell, 1st Earl of Farnham. Absence from the poll book either meant a resident did not vote or more likely was not a freeholder entitled to vote, which would mean most of the inhabitants of Sralahan.

The 1821 Census of Ireland spells the name as Stralahan.

An 1831 map spells the name as Shralaghan and lists the owner as Sir Hugh Crofton, baronet. The landlord of Sralahan in the 19th century was the Crofton Estate. The National Library of Ireland holds rentals of the Crofton estate from 1769 to 1814, MS Numbers 20,783 and 4530.

The 1834 Tithe Applotment Books spell the name as Stralahan.

The 1836 Ordnance Survey Namebooks state- Lime is procured and used for manure, but the soil is bad and produces light crops of oats, potatoes and flax.

Griffith's Valuation lists four landholders in the townland.

Folklore relating to Sralahan was collected in the 1938 Dúchas collection.

== Census ==
Year	Population	Males	Females	Total Houses	Uninhabited
1841	26	15	11	4	0
1851	30	17	13	5	0
1861	24	12	12	5	0
1871	31	16	15	4	0
1881	28	14	14	5	0
1891	25	11	14	4	0

In the 1821 Census of Ireland, there were eight families in the townland.

A rare survival from the 1851 Census of Ireland is a sheet for the McBrien family of Sralahan.

In the 1901 census of Ireland, there were four families listed in the townland.

In the 1911 census of Ireland, there were seven families listed in the townland.

== Antiquities ==
1. Stone bridges over the river.
