= Gubrimmaddera =

Townland in Kinawley, County Cavan, Ireland

Coordinates: 54°11′02″N 7°43′42″W

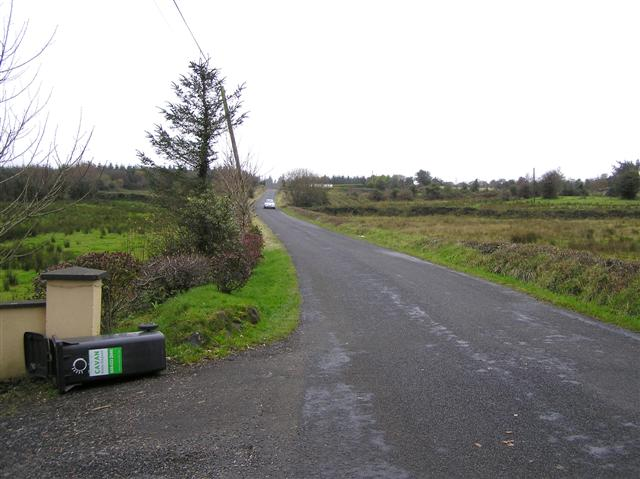
Road at Grubrimmaddera

Gubrimmaddera (Irish derived place name, Gob Dhroim Mhadra, meaning 'The Headland of the Ridge of Dogs or Foxes') is a townland in the civil parish of Kinawley, barony of Tullyhaw, County Cavan, Ireland.

== Geography ==
Gubrimmaddera is bounded on the west by Gubnafarna and Knockranny townlands and on the east by Cornalon and Gorteennaglogh townlands. Its chief geographical features are the River Cladagh (Swanlinbar), mountain streams, a spring well and a dug well. Gubrimmaddera is traversed by minor public roads and rural lanes. The townland covers 67 statute acres.

== History ==
The Tithe Applotment Books 1834 spell the name as Gubramadariff.

The Gubrimmaddera Valuation Office Field books are available for 1838.

Griffith's Valuation lists four landholders in the townland.

The landlord of Gubrimmaddera in the 19th century was the Crofton Estate. The Crofton Estate papers are in the National Library of Ireland, MS 20,773-20,806 & D 26,886-27,010.

== Census ==
Year	Population	Males	Females	Total Houses	Uninhabited
1841	22	10	12	4	0
1851	22	10	12	4	0
1861	21	12	9	4	0
1871	23	11	12	4	0
1881	16	6	10	4	0
1891	11	5	6	4	0

In the 1901 census of Ireland, there were five families listed in the townland.

In the 1911 census of Ireland, there were six families listed in the townland.

== Antiquities ==
1. Stepping-stones over the river
