= Gubrawoolly =

Town

Gubrawoolly or Gubrawully (Irish derived place name either Gob a Raith Bhuailidh, meaning the 'Headland of the Dairy Fort' or Gob an Mhullaigh, meaning the ‘Headland of the Summit’) is a townland in the civil parish of Kinawley, barony of Tullyhaw, County Cavan, Ireland.

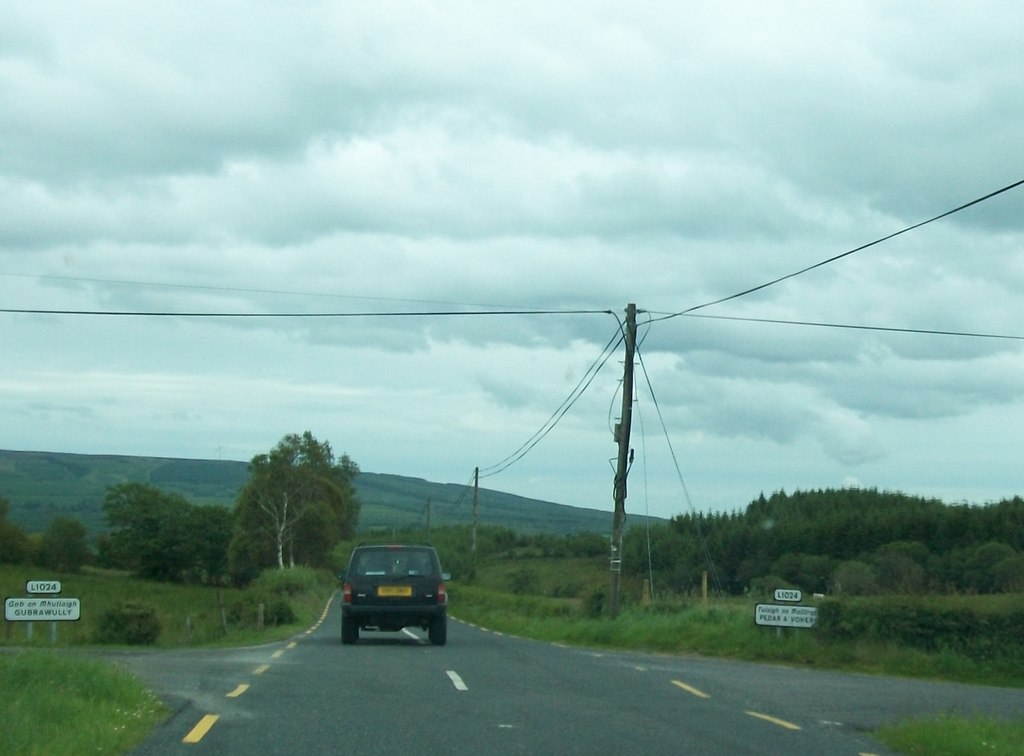
The R200 at the Gubrawully Cross Roads (geograph 2698904)

== Geography ==
Gubrawoolly is bounded on the west by Altbrean, Altinure, Drumcask and Sralahan (Kinawley) townlands and on the east by Derryrealt, Drumbeagh, Drumcar (Kinawley) and Drumcullion townlands. Its chief geographical features are small hills which rise to 525 feet above sea level, the River Cladagh (Swanlinbar), a mountain trout stream which later joins the River Cladagh (Swanlinbar), small rivulets, forestry plantations and dug wells. Gubrawully is traversed by the regional R200 road (Ireland), the local L1024 road, minor public roads and rural lanes. The townland covers 304 statute acres.

== History ==
In earlier times the townland was probably uninhabited as it consists mainly of bog and poor clay soils. It was not seized by the English during the Plantation of Ulster in 1610 or in the Cromwellian Settlement of the 1660s so some dispossessed Irish families moved there and began to clear and farm the land.

The 1825 Tithe Applotment Books spell the name as Guberawella.

An 1831 map spells the name as Gubberawooly and Gubberawooley and lists the owner as the Hassard estate.

Griffith's Valuation lists twenty-five landholders in the townland.

Gubrawully folklore is found in the 1938 Dúchas collection.

== Census ==
Year	Population	Males	Females	Total houses	Uninhabited
1841	84	45	39	12	1
1851	80	48	42	16	0
1861	88	47	41	13	0
1871	79	45	34	14	1
1881	60	37	23	12	0
1891	59	36	23	12	0

In the 1901 census of Ireland, there are seventeen families listed in the townland.

In the 1911 census of Ireland, there are fourteen families listed in the townland.

== Antiquities ==
1. A lime-kiln
2. Stone bridges over the river
3. A ford over the river
4. Stepping-stones over the river
