= Gorteen (Kinawley) =

Townland in County Cavan, Ireland

Gorteen (Irish derived place name Goirtín, meaning ‘Little Field’) is a townland in the civil parish of Kinawley, barony of Tullyhaw, County Cavan, Ireland.

== Geography ==
Gorteen is bounded on the north by Furnaceland townland, on the south by Borim (Kinawley) townland, on the west by Cornalon and Derryrealt townlands and on the east by Killaghaduff and Tircahan townlands. Its chief geographical features are the Blackwater river which later flows into the River Cladagh (Swanlinbar), mountain streams, gravel pits, a spring well and dug wells. Gorteen is traversed by the national secondary N87 road (Ireland), minor public roads and rural lanes. The townland covers 135 statute acres.

== History ==
In medieval times Gorteen was owned by the McGovern Clan and formed part of a ballybetagh spelled (variously) Aghycloony, Aghcloone, Nacloone, Naclone and Noclone (Irish derived place name Áth Chluain, meaning ‘The Ford of the Meadow’). The 1609 Baronial Map depicts the ballybetagh as Naclone.

In the Plantation of Ulster by grant dated 26 June 1615, King James VI and I granted, inter alia, The precinct or parcel of Nacloone otherwise Aghcloone to Sir George Graeme and Sir Richard Graeme to form part of the Manor of Greame. A history of Richard and George Graham is viewable online. The Grahams took part in the Irish Rebellion of 1641 and their lands, including Gorteen, were confiscated after the rebellion.

The 1821 Census of Ireland spells the name as Gorteen and states- contains 48 acres of arable land & 30 of bog.

The 1836 Ordnance Survey Namebooks state- Lime is procured on the ground and is used for manure.

The Gorteen Valuation Office Field books are available for August 1838.

Griffith's Valuation lists twenty-one landholders in the townland.

The landlord of Gorteen in the 1850s was Robert Roycroft

== Census ==
| Year | Population | Males | Females | Total Houses | Uninhabited |
|---|---|---|---|---|---|
| 1841 | 103 | 49 | 54 | 19 | 0 |
| 1851 | 82 | 40 | 42 | 14 | 0 |
| 1861 | 69 | 37 | 32 | 14 | 1 |
| 1871 | 60 | 35 | 25 | 9 | 0 |
| 1881 | 48 | 27 | 21 | 7 | 0 |
| 1891 | 38 | 18 | 20 | 7 | 0 |

In the Census of Ireland 1821 there were eight families listed in the townland.

In the 1901 census of Ireland, there are eight families listed in the townland.

In the 1911 census of Ireland, there are seven families listed in the townland.
