= Derryrealt =

Townland in County Cavan, Ireland

Derryrealt (Irish derived place name Doire ar Alt, meaning ‘Oakwood at the Ravine’) is a townland in the civil parish of Kinawley, barony of Tullyhaw, County Cavan, Ireland.

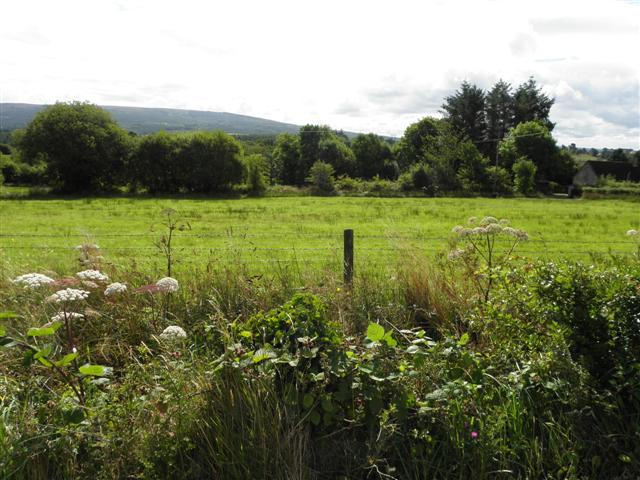
Derryrealt (townland) (geograph 3597195)

== Geography ==
Derryrealt is bounded on the south by Drumcullion townland, on the west by Drumcask and Gubrawully townlands and on the east by Borim (Kinawley), Cornalon, Drumboory and Gorteen (Kinawley) townlands. Its chief geographical features are a mountain trout stream which later joins the River Cladagh (Swanlinbar), small rivulets, a gravel pit, spring wells and a dug well. Derryrealt is traversed by minor public roads and rural lanes. The townland covers 233 statute acres.

== History ==
In medieval times Derryrealt was owned by the McGovern Clan and formed part of a ballybetagh spelled (variously) Aghycloony, Aghcloone, Nacloone, Naclone and Noclone (Irish derived place name Áth Chluain, meaning ‘The Ford of the Meadow’). The 1609 Baronial Map depicts the ballybetagh as Naclone.

In the Plantation of Ulster by grant dated 29 April 1611, along with other lands, King James VI and I granted the part poll of Direrall to Mulmore McTirlagh O'Reily, Gentleman. The said Maelmordha O'Reilly was related to chiefs of the O'Reilly clan, which is why he received a grant of land. His great-grandfather was Maolmhordha O'Reilly who was chief from 1537 to 1565. He was a grand-nephew of both Aodh Connallach O'Reilly who was chief from 1565 to 1583 and of Emonn O'Reilly who was chief from 1596 to 1601. He was a first cousin once-removed of Sean O'Reilly who was chief from 1583 to 1596. He was also a first cousin once-removed of Donill Backagh McShane O'Reyly who was also granted lands in Burren (townland) and of Cahell M'Owen O Reyly who received lands in Gowlagh South townland and of Cahir McOwen O'Reily, who received lands in Kildoagh townland.

In the Plantation of Ulster by grant dated 26 June 1615, King James VI and I granted, inter alia, The precinct or parcel of Nacloone otherwise Aghcloone to Sir George Graeme and Sir Richard Graeme to form part of the Manor of Greame, but the townland of Dirirall already granted to the aforementioned Mulmore McTirlagh O'Reily was specifically excluded from this grant.

The 1652 Commonwealth Survey spells the townland as Dirreraell, with the proprietor being Mr Henry Crafton and the tenants being Donogh Magwire & others. The townland then formed part of the Crofton estate until the late 19th century. The Crofton Estate papers are in the National Library of Ireland, MS 20,773-20,806 & D 26,886-27,010.

The 1790 Cavan Carvagh list spells the name as Derryreal.

The 1821 Census of Ireland spells the name as Dereralth and states- Containing 100 acres arable land & 44 acres bog & mountain.

The 1825 Tithe Applotment Books spell the name as Derraralt.

The Derryrealt Valuation Office Field books are available for August 1838. Griffith's Valuation lists fourteen landholders in the townland. Folklore about Derryrealt is in the 1938 Dúchas collection.

An IRA member, Patrick McManus, was killed by his own explosives in Derryrealt on 15 July 1958.

== Census ==
Year	Population	Males	Females	Total Houses	Uninhabited
1841	93	45	48	17	1
1851	81	48	33	14	1
1861	72	39	33	12	0
1871	72	32	40	14	0
1881	68	31	37	14	0
1891	53	26	27	11	0

In the Census of Ireland 1821 there are twenty-four families listed in the townland.

In the 1901 census of Ireland, there are twelve families listed in the townland.

In the 1911 census of Ireland, there are ten families listed in the townland.

== Antiquities ==
1. A ford over the river
2. Stepping-stones over the river
3. Foot-bridges over the river
4. A foot-stick over the stream
5. A lime-kiln
6. Derryrealt 19th century National School, Roll No. 4886. The 1938 Dúchas folklore collection states- There were two hedge-schools in Derryrealt. Teachers in Derryrealt named Cassidy and Doogan came from Gortoral every morning-about five miles. On 30 September 1855 the headmaster, a Roman Catholic, received an annual salary of £19. There were 79 pupils, 51 boys and 28 girls. In 1862 the headmaster was Peter McManus, a Roman Catholic, who received an annual salary of £14. There were 75 pupils in the school, all Roman Catholic, apart from 6 who were Church of Ireland. The Catholic pupils were taught Catechism on Saturdays from 10:30am to 12:30pm. In 1865 the headmaster, a Roman Catholic, received an annual salary of £18. There were 71 pupils, 41 boys and 30 girls. In 1874 the headmaster, a Roman Catholic, received an annual salary of £24. There were 59 pupils, 37 boys and 22 girls.
