= Commas (Kinawley) =

Townland in County Cavan, Ireland

Commas (Irish derived place name Cam Eas, meaning either ‘The Bend in the River’ or ‘The Crooked Stream’) is a townland in the civil parish of Kinawley, barony of Tullyhaw, County Cavan, Ireland. Sub-divisions of the townland are- (a) The Strait - A name given to a hollow in the townland up near Cuilcagh mountain; (b) Knocknamaddoo (Irish derived place name Cnoc na Mada, meaning ‘The Hill of the Dogs (or Foxes)’; (c) Sruhan Doo (Irish derived place name Sruthan Dubh, meaning ‘The Black Stream’ because it is so coloured by the peat in the bog through which it flows), Easa Iarainn (Irish derived place name Easa Iarainn, meaning ‘The Iron Waterfall’) and Loinin (Irish derived place name Loinín, meaning ‘The Little Meadow’), are names given to streams flowing down the mountain in Commas.

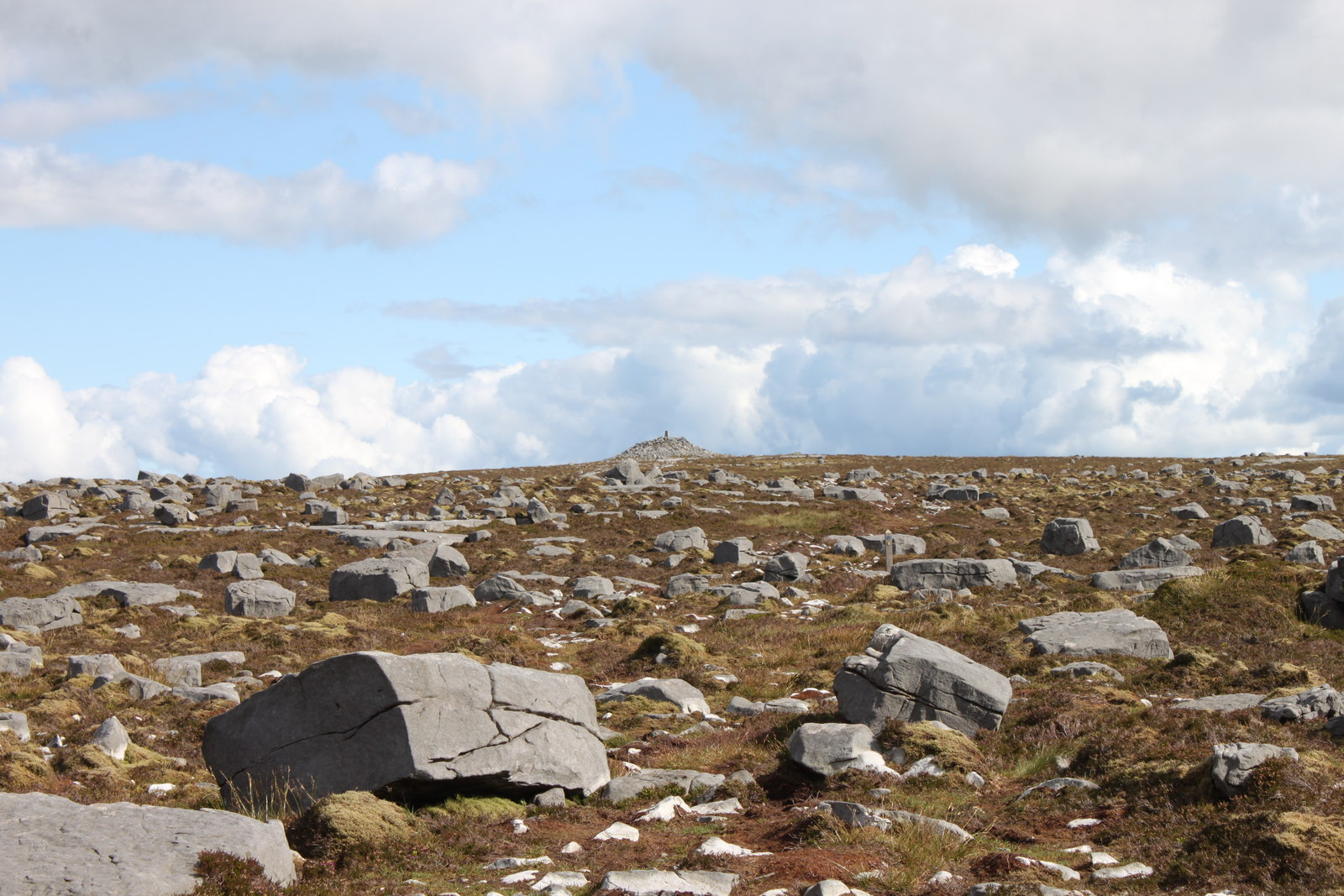
Cuilcagh Mountain Cairn and Landscape (geograph 2038072)

== Geography ==
Commas is bounded on the north by Alteen townland, on the south by Aghnacollia and Altbrean townlands, on the west by Aghatirourke, Bellavally Lower, Bellavally Upper, Bursan, Dunmakeever and Legnaderk townlands and on the east by Aghaboy (Kinawley), Binkeeragh, Monydoo (or Tonycrom) and Tullydermot townlands. Its chief geographical features are Cuilcagh mountain which rise to 2,188 feet above sea level, Binbeg mountain which rises to 1,774 feet, mountain pools, the River Cladagh (Swanlinbar), mountain streams, waterfalls, underground streams, river swallow holes, ravines, caverns and forestry plantations. Commas is traversed by minor public roads and rural lanes. The townland covers 2,551 statute acres and is the largest townland in County Cavan.

== History ==
In the 1609 Plantation of Ulster, Commas formed part of the mountain of Cuilcagh which were granted to John Sandford of Castle Doe, Co. Donegal (the father-in-law of Thomas Guyllym of Ballyconnell) by letters patent dated 7 July 1613 (Pat. 11 James I – LXXI – 38, ‘Quilkagh’). It was later sold by Sandford to his wife's uncle Toby Caulfeild, 1st Baron Caulfeild, Master of the Ordnance and Caulfield had the sale confirmed by letters patent of 12 July 1620 (Pat. 19 James I. XI. 45 ‘‘Quilkagh’’).

The 1821 census states- Commas containing 500 acres of Black Mountain. There is Iron Mines in many parts.

An 1834 map shows Commas as belonging to the Hassard estate.

The 1836 Ordnance Survey Namebooks state- The Swanlinbar or Claddagh River rises in this townland, being the collection of a great many small streams which unite near the east side of the townland and runs towards the south-east.

Griffith's Valuation lists four landholders in the townland.

Folklore relating to Commas was collected in the 1938 Dúchas collection.

Commas National School, Roll No. 5270, was actually situated in Knockranny townland.

== Census ==
Year	Population	Males	Females	Total Houses	Uninhabited
1841	40	20	20	8	0
1851	13	8	5	2	0
1861	18	12	6	3	0
1871	26	14	12	6	0
1881	6	3	3	1	0
1891	9	5	4	1	0

In the Census of Ireland 1821, there were two families living in the townland.

In the 1901 census of Ireland, there was one family listed in the townland.

In the 1911 census of Ireland, there was one family listed in the townland.

== Antiquities ==
1. A stone cairn. Described in the ‘Archaeological Inventory of County Cavan’ (Site No. 123), Patrick O’Donovan, 1995, as- An almost circular cairn (diam. c. 16m; H 3.2m). The NE half of the site is enclosed by the remains of a substantial drystone wall. Situated on the summit of Cuilcagh Mountain on the border between counties Cavan and Fermanagh. The site was known as 'Lacht a mhac a whoole' commemorating McEnhill, chief of a clan driven out of Tyrone by the O'Neills. According to tradition the cairn was used as an inauguration site by the Maguires. In the late forties of this century workers tossed some stones and built a triangulation station on top of the monument (Glangevlin Guild ICA 1983, 42). There are three hut sites a short distance to SE (CV006-003001-, CV006-003002-, CV006-003003-). The website Glangevlin.com states- On the top of Cuilcagh are two monuments about three miles apart, one of which is only a small one called Lacht an Phelim from Phelim O'Dolan who was an ancient proprietor of Gleann Gaibhle. It was erected some centuries ago. The O'Dolans.were a wealthy family and owned the townland of Gub. The larger monument was known as Lacht a mhac a' Whoole from a ‘mac a' Whoole’ [McEnhill in English) the head of a clan who were driven out of Tyrone by the O'Neills centuries ago and fled to the mountains with a party of followers and stayed there until they were betrayed. This monument resembles a fort surrounded by a large wall of dry stone. Near this erection bee-hived shaped huts can be seen. These were probably built by the Tyrone clan. Some say that writers used them and that one night a terrible storm of thunder and lightning broke out and that those writers fled and never returned. In the late forties of this present century workers tossed some stones and built a triangulation station by night on the top of the monument. A date, June 11, 1949, is quite visible. Other stations were built at the same time all over Ireland and were used to map the country. In the fifties other work was carried out by night. Those monuments form part of the border between Cavan and Fermanagh but it is easier to reach them from the Cavan side. Dean Henry climbed in 1739 from this side. Many schools and colleges organise bus tours to the large monument as it is a tourist attraction. St. Patrick is said to have prayed at the Monument.
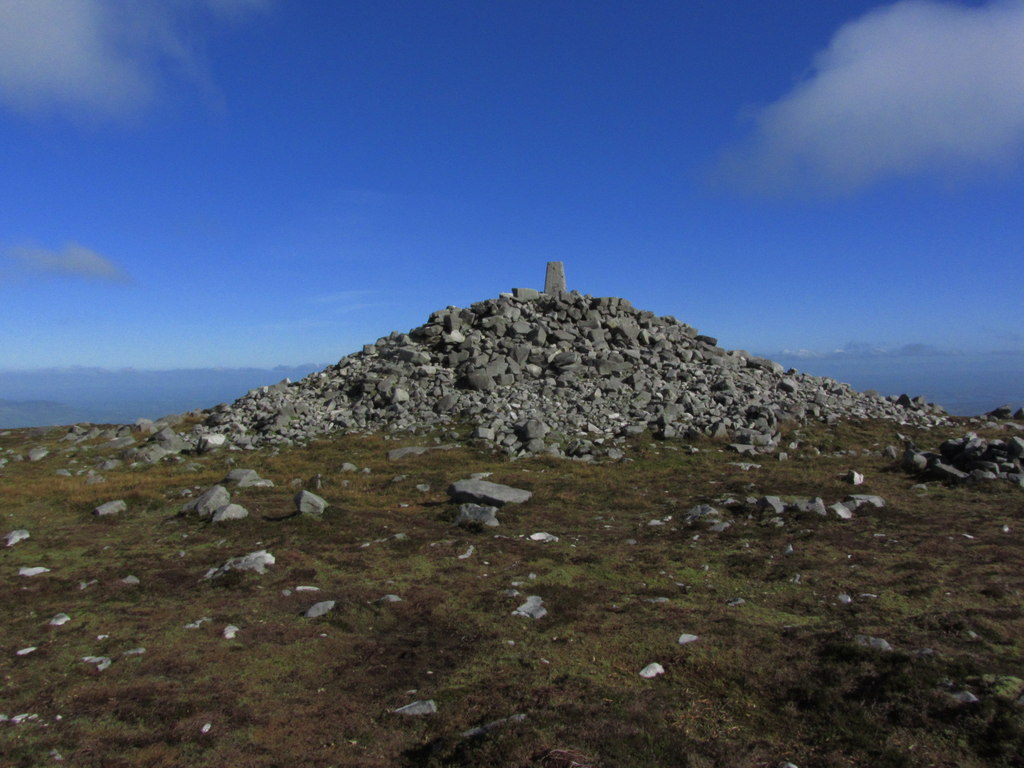
  Cuilcagh - Summit cairn & trig point (geograph 3762624)
2. A stone hut. Described in the ‘Archaeological Inventory of County Cavan’ (Site No. 1268), Patrick O’Donovan, 1995, as- Small circular area (int. diam. 1.8m) enclosed by the remains of a crude drystone wall (H 0.4m). Situated 3m SE of a substantial cairn in rough terrain close to the summit of Cuilcagh Mountain and the border between counties Cavan and Fermanagh (CV006-001----). Two similar hut sites are situated nearby (CV006-003002-, CV006-003003-).
3. A stone hut. Described in the ‘Archaeological Inventory of County Cavan’ (Site No. 1269), Patrick O’Donovan, 1995, as- Circular area (int. diam. 3.2m) enclosed by the remains of a crude drystone wall (H. 0.6m) with entrance feature (Wth 0.8m) at SE. Situated c. 100m SE of a substantial cairn (CV006-001----) in rough terrain close to the summit of Cuilcagh Mountain. Two similar hut sites are situated nearby (CV006-003001-, CV006-003003-).
4. A stone hut. Described in the ‘Archaeological Inventory of County Cavan’ (Site No. 1270), Patrick O’Donovan, 1995, as- Situated 110m SE of a substantial cairn (CV006-001----) in rough terrain close to the summit of Cuilcagh Mountain. Roughly circular area (int. diam. 4.5m) enclosed by the remains of a crude drystone wall. At NW, SW and SE its foundation stones can be seen protruding from the heather. Two similar hut sites are close by (CV006-003001-, CV006-003002-).
5. Stone bridges over the river.
6. Stepping-stones over the river
