= Knockranny =

Townland in County Cavan, Ireland

Knockranny (Irish derived place name, Cnoc Raithní, meaning ‘The Hill of the Ferns’) is a townland in the civil parish of Kinawley, barony of Tullyhaw, County Cavan, Ireland.

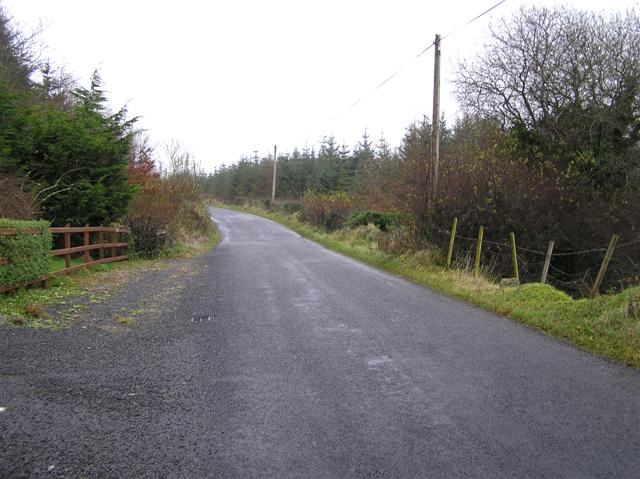
Mill Road - geograph.org.uk - 1054750

== Geography ==
Knockranny is bounded on the south by Knockroe (Kinawley) townland, on the west by Gubnafarna townland and on the east by Cornalon, Drumcask and Gubrimmaddera townlands. Its chief geographical features are the River Cladagh (Swanlinbar), a mountain stream, forestry plantations and a dug well. Knockranny is traversed by minor public roads and rural lanes. The townland covers 132 statute acres.

== History ==
In a deed dated 28 July 1720 from Morley Saunders conveyed to Richard Hassard, the lands of Knockrany whose tenants were Torlagh McManus and Patrick McGowran.

A deed by Thomas Enery dated 29 Jan 1735 includes the lands of Knockranny.

In a deed dated 13 August 1738 John Enery conveyed to Richard Hassard, the lands of Knockrany.

The 1821 Census of Ireland spells the name as Knockrany, Nocrany and Nockreany and states it- contains 20 acres arable land & 38 acres bog & mountain.

The Tithe Applotment Books 1834 spell the name as Knockranny.

The Knockranny Valuation Office Field books are available for 1838.

Griffith's Valuation lists fourteen landholders in the townland.

The landlord of Knockranny in the 19th century was the Hassard Estate.

== Census ==
| Year | Population | Males | Females | Total Houses | Uninhabited |
|---|---|---|---|---|---|
| 1841 | 61 | 29 | 32 | 11 | 0 |
| 1851 | 62 | 29 | 33 | 10 | 0 |
| 1861 | 45 | 19 | 26 | 10 | 0 |
| 1871 | 31 | 15 | 16 | 9 | 0 |
| 1881 | 38 | 20 | 18 | 9 | 0 |
| 1891 | 23 | 15 | 8 | 9 | 1 |

In the Census of Ireland 1821, there were seven families living in the townland.

In the 1901 census of Ireland, there were seven families listed in the townland.

In the 1911 census of Ireland, there were seven families listed in the townland.

== Antiquities ==
1. Commas National School, Roll No. 5270, is actually situated in Knockranny townland.
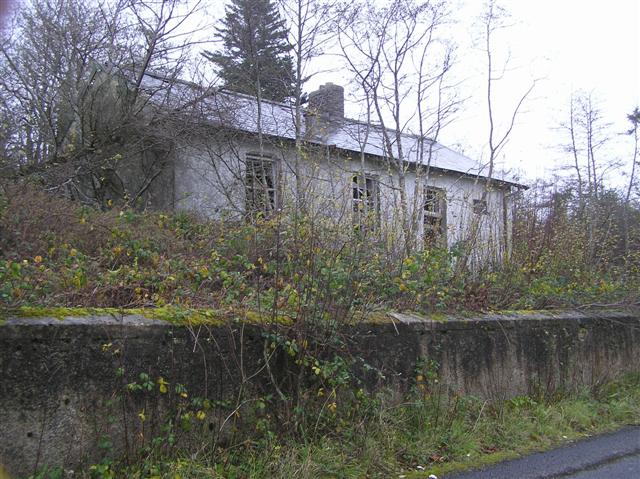
  Commas National School - geograph.org.uk - 1054751
  On 30 September 1855 the headmaster, a Roman Catholic, received an annual salary of £19. There were 51 pupils, 34 boys and 17 girls. In 1862 the headmaster was John McGovern, a Roman Catholic who received an annual salary of £22-10s. There were 75 pupils in the school, all Roman Catholic apart from 5 who were Church of Ireland. The Catholic pupils were taught Catechism on Tuesdays and Thursdays from 3pm to 3:30pm and on Saturdays from 12 noon to 1pm. In 1874 the headmaster, a Roman Catholic, received an annual salary of £24. There were 103 pupils, 54 boys and 49 girls. In 1886 the headmaster, a Roman Catholic, received an annual salary of £40-6s-6d. There were 80 pupils, 37 boys and 43 girls. In 1890 there were 79 pupils.
2. Stepping-stones over the river.
