= Gubnafarna =

Townland in County Cavan, Ireland

Gubnafarna (Irish derived place name, Gob na Fearna, meaning ‘The Headland of the Alder Trees’) is a townland in the civil parish of Kinawley, barony of Tullyhaw, County Cavan, Ireland.

== Geography ==
Gubnafarna is bounded on the west by Binkeeragh and Knockroe (Kinawley) townlands and on the east by Aghaboy (Kinawley), Gorteennaglogh, Gubrimmaddera and Knockranny townlands. Its chief geographical features are mountain streams; forestry plantations; dug wells and spring wells. Gubnafarna is traversed by minor public roads and rural lanes. The townland covers 245 statute acres.

== History ==
In 1720 Morley Saunders was in possession. He leased his interest in Gobnafafarna, alias Gobbinefinna to Colonel John Enery of Bawnboy by deeds dated 23 and 24 December 1720.

A deed by Thomas Enery dated 29 Jan 1735 includes the lands of Gubnefarna.

A deed dated 13 Nov 1738 includes: Gobninefinna.

A deed dated 13 September 1774 by John Enery spells the townland as Gobnafarna otherwise Gubnafarna.

The 1821 Census of Ireland spells the name as Gubnafarna and Gartnafeerna.

The Tithe Applotment Books 1834 spell the name as Gubnafarna.

The Gubnafarna Valuation Office Field books are available for 1838.

Griffith's Valuation lists thirteen landholders in the townland.

The landlord of Gubnafarna in the 19th century was the Hassard Estate.

== Census ==
Year	Population	Males	Females	Total Houses	Uninhabited
1841	78	39	39	13	0
1851	60	35	25	10	0
1861	69	32	37	12	0
1871	62	29	33	13	1
1881	74	40	34	13	0
1891	75	36	39	13	1

In the Census of Ireland 1821, there were nine households in the townland.

In the 1901 census of Ireland, there were fourteen families listed in the townland.

In the 1911 census of Ireland, there were twelve families listed in the townland.

== Antiquities ==
1. Stepping-stones over the stream
2. Foot-bridges over the stream
