= Hawkswood =

Townland in County Cavan, Ireland

Hawkswood (English-derived place name. The earliest known spelling is Hawswood, meaning The Wood of the Hawthorns but the name seems to have been later corrupted to Hawkswood) is a townland in the civil parish of Kinawley, Barony of Tullyhaw, County Cavan, Ireland. The original Irish place name was Cluain Caomh meaning 'The Beautiful Meadow'. The town of Swanlinbar is partially situated in Hawkswood. According to the 1938 Dúchas collection two sub-divisions are- The Cleity (Perhaps from the Gaelic 'Cleitigh' meaning feathers or plume or quill.)- A name given to a field in a farm owned by Mr. Patrick Maguire, Hawkswood, Swanlinbar, Co. Cavan. The Rhythars - a name given to a field in a farm owned by Mr Hugh McBrien, Hawkswood, Swanlinbar.

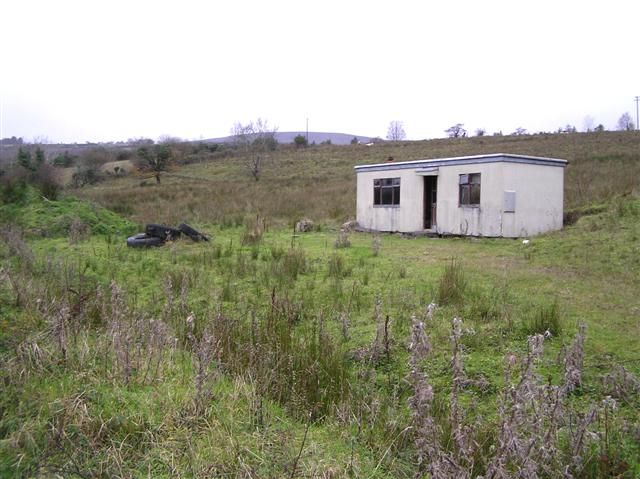
Near Swanlinbar - geograph.org.uk - 1054741

== Geography ==
Hawkswood is bounded on the north by Corranearty townland, on the south by Furnaceland townland, on the west by Gorteennaglogh and Monydoo (or Tonycrom) townlands and on the east by Cloghoge, Cornagran (Kinawley) and Drumconra (or Lowforge) townlands. Its chief geographical features are the River Cladagh (Swanlinbar), streams, the Mill Pond and Mill Race, a forestry plantation and a dug well. Hawkswood is traversed by the national secondary N87 road (Ireland), the Old Coach Road, minor public roads and rural lanes. The Hawkswood Loop is popular with mountain trekkers. The townland covers 178 statute acres.

== History ==
According to the 'Life of Saint Naile', the original Christian church of Kinawley parish was in Hawkswood townland and was founded by St. Ternoc. The Life states that Naile arranged a meeting with Saint Mogue (Máedóc of Ferns) at Cluain Caomh, which was the old name for Hawkswood. While he was waiting for Mogue to turn up, he asked St. Ternoc for a drink of water but was refused. He then in anger hurled his staff three ploughlands (six tates or townlands) and where it landed a spring gushed forth and he founded his church there, where now stands the church of Kinawley and Naile's Holy Well. Oddly enough there are indeed six townlands between Hawkswood and Lismonaghan townland, Kinawley village, where St. Naile's church is situated today. The Life of Naile was composed in c. 1520 from earlier sources and is probably a reflection of what originally happened, i.e. Hawkswood church was on the boundary between Tullyhaw or Magh Slécht (where Mogue was the patron saint) and Fermanagh. The Airgíalla were moving into the area and then took the overlordship of the church occupied by Ternoc and gave it to their own priests.

In medieval times, Hawkswood was owned by the McGovern Clan and formed part of a ballybetagh spelled (variously) Aghycloony, Aghcloone, Nacloone, Naclone and Noclone (Irish derived place name Áth Chluain, meaning "The Ford of the Meadow", probably meaning the ford over the Cladagh River where the church of Cluain Caomh stood). The 1609 Baronial Map depicts the ballybetagh as Naclone.

In the Plantation of Ulster by grant dated 26 June 1615, King James VI and I granted, inter alia, The precinct or parcel of Nacloone otherwise Aghcloone to Sir George Graeme and Sir Richard Graeme to form part of the Manor of Greame. An Inquisition held at Cavan Town on 31 October 1627 found that Sir Richard Greames of Corrasmongan died on 7 November 1625 seized of, inter alia, one poll in Clonkye.

A history of Richard and George Graham is viewable online. The Grahams took part in the Irish Rebellion of 1641 and after the war their lands were confiscated under the Act for the Settlement of Ireland 1652 and Hawkswood was given to Thomas Worsop.

The 1652 Commonwealth Survey spells the townland as Cloonkiow with the proprietor being Mr Thomas Worshipp and the tenants being Tiernan McHugh & others.

By a lease dated 13 February 1726 Major-General Owen Wynne (British Army officer) of Hazelwood, County Sligo, assigned the lands of Hawswood alias Swadlingbarr Towne, to William Cross, of Drummonum, County Cavan.

By a lease dated 11 August 1736 Richard Cross of Dromomuniny, County Cavan, assigned, the lands of Hawkeswood, that is from the watercourse and Dromconra, containing 28 acres, to John Mahan, Innkeeper and William Mahan, Shopkeeper, both of Swadlingbar.

In the Cavan Poll Book of 1761, there was one person registered to vote in Hawkswood in the Irish general election, 1761 - John Beahy of Swanlinbar. He was entitled to cast two votes. The four election candidates were Charles Coote, 1st Earl of Bellomont and Lord Newtownbutler (later Brinsley Butler, 2nd Earl of Lanesborough), both of whom were then elected Member of Parliament for Cavan County. The losing candidates were George Montgomery (MP) of Ballyconnell and Barry Maxwell, 1st Earl of Farnham. Absence from the poll book either meant a resident did not vote or more likely was not a freeholder entitled to vote, which would mean most of the inhabitants of Hawkswood.

The 1790 Cavan Carvagh list spells the name as Clunekeen.

The 1821 Census of Ireland spells the name as "Clinceeff or Hawkswood" and states- contains 100 acres of arable land. Different applotments of it held by people who do not live on it. There stands a corn kiln & mill on same lands.

The Registry of Freeholders for County Cavan states that on 13 January 1825 there was one freeholder registered in Hawkswood- Mr D. Thompson esquire of Dublin City. He held the land in fee-simple.

The 1825 Tithe Applotment Books spell the name as Hawkswood.

The Hawkswood Valuation Office Field books are available for 1838-1840.

Griffith's Valuation lists forty-two landholders in the townland, including the town of Swanlinbar.

Folklore from Hawkswood and Swanlinbar is found in the 1938 Dúchas collection.

== Notable residents ==
The grandmother of the painter John Butler Yeats was Grace Armstrong of Hawkswood. She was a grand-niece of John Armstrong (British Army officer).

== Census ==
That part of Hawkswood lying outside Swanlinbar Town (for the town census, see Swanlinbar).

Year	Population	Males	Females	Total Houses	Uninhabited
1841	11	5	6	5	3
1851	9	3	6	3	0
1861	28	13	15	7	2
1871	20	11	8	4	0
1881	16	5	11	7	0
1891	9	4	5	5	1

In the Census of Ireland 1821 there were four households in the townland outside of the town of Swanlinbar but there were separate entries for the town itself.

In the 1901 census of Ireland, there were four families listed in the townland outside of the town of Swanlinbar but there is a separate entry for the part lying in the town itself.

In the 1911 census of Ireland, there were four families listed in the townland outside of the town of Swanlinbar but there is a separate entry for the part lying in the town itself.

== Antiquities ==
1. Foot-bridges over the streams.
2. A 19th-century Corn-mill and Corn-Kiln.
3. A 19th-century leather tannery
4. A water-hydrant erected c. 1880. The website www.buildings ofireland.ie describes it as- Freestanding cast-iron water hydrant, erected c.1880. Fluted shaft on ogee-moulded base, with roll-moulded necking and capital, fluted domed cap with acorn finial. Lion mask spout overlaid on necking, recent tap fitted to rim of capital. Set into tarmac on public footpath with base partially beneath surface. Appraisal- This water hydrant is of technical and social heritage interest, dating from the period before public mains water supply when clean drinking water was provided at a communal source. Its survival in its original context enhances its interest. This hydrant is one of a set of three in the locality of Swanlinbar. It is also of design interest, demonstrating the high aesthetic quality of functional cast-iron work in the late nineteenth and early twentieth centuries.
5. A water-hydrant erected c. 1880. The website www.buildings ofireland.ie describes it as- Freestanding cast-iron water hydrant, c.1880, still in use. Fluted shaft on ogee-moulded base, with roll-moulded necking and capital, fluted domed cap with acorn finial. Lion mask spout overlaid on necking, recent tap fitted to rim of capital. Set into concrete on public footpath in line of sandstone kerbing. Appraisal- This water hydrant is of technical and social heritage interest, dating from the period before public mains water supply when clean drinking water was provided at a communal source. Its survival in its original context enhances its interest. Set in Swanlinbar it is one of a group of three in the locality, its counterparts located outside the town.
6. Public house built c.1870. The website www.buildings ofireland.ie describes the building as- Detached four-bay two-storey house, built c.1870, with half dormers to upper floor. Now also in use as public house with recent pub front in two southern bays. Central gabled projection to rear with later single-storey lean-to extension. Pitched slate roof with clay ridge tiles, having flat roofs and cornices to central half-dormers and pitched slate roofs with timber bargeboards to gabled half-dormers. Rendered chimneystacks to gables and centre of ridge, cast-iron rainwater goods to eaves, with replacement uPVC gutter at sill level of half-dormers. Smooth rendered walls. Square-headed windows to half dormers with one-over-one timber sash windows. Bipartite sash window to northern bay at ground level. Door opening to north with timber door and side lights. Symmetrical timber pubfront comprising glazed timber door flanked by multiple paned windows, having timber fascia with painted lettering above. Opens directly onto street. Appraisal- An eye-catching nineteenth-century building, distinguished by its long form and striking dormer windows. The house is a well-preserved example of the nineteenth-century architecture and retains much of its historic character and charm. It makes a valuable contribution to the historic character of Swanlinbar.
7. Dwelling house built c. 1820. The website www.buildings ofireland.ie describes the building as- Terraced five-bay two-storey house, built c. 1820, with unevenly spaced openings. Pitched slate roof with clay ridge tiles, sandstone barge coping, rendered chimneystack to ridge and north party-wall, replacement metal gutters with cast-iron downpipes and hopper head to north party-wall. Ruled-and-lined rendered walls. One-over-one timber sliding-sash windows with exposed sash boxes, stone sills, and later raised surrounds. Panelled shutters with octagonal motif to interior. Slightly off centre doorcase comprising panelled Doric pilasters supporting entablature with Greek-key ornament and moulded cornice. Rectangular glazed overlight having ellipse and diagonal cross divisions over replacement glazed timber door. Opens directly on to street. Appraisal An early nineteenth-century building of unusually wide frontage, shown together with its three-bay neighbour on the Ordnance Survey map of 1836 forming the street front of a large garden of formal layout. The irregularly spaced openings contrast with the formality of the doorcase which is of an ambitious Greek Revival design. Much of the historic fabric of the building survives, including sash windows with decorative internal shutters and the moulded doorcase. The house is a well-preserved example of the nineteenth-century street architecture of the town and forms an integral part of the historic character of the town.
8. Dwelling house built c. 1840. The website www.buildings ofireland.ie describes the building as- Terraced two-bay two-storey vernacular house, built c. 1840, with carriage arch at ground floor and two-storey extension of c. 1900 to rear, now disused. Pitched roof with imitation tile covering to front and artificial slates to rear, rendered chimney stack to west party-wall, replacement steel rainwater goods. Wet-dash to front with smooth bevelled plinth course and vertical band to party walls, roughcast finish to rear and extension. Lime washed walls within carriage arch with timber carriageway soffit. Unaligned openings to front with stone sills and patent reveals having one-over-one timber sash windows to first floor, set higher over elliptical-headed carriage archway, and one two-over-two sash window to ground floor, windows to rear blocked up. Tongue-and-grooved timber door centred on front elevation with upper glazed panel. Opens directly onto pavement on Mill Street, roadway elevated above pavement with tarmac surface to carriageway. Appraisal A small house of striking vernacular character, having an eccentric loosely composed front elevation typical of the simple everyday architecture of a smaller Irish town. The house adjoins a terrace of larger scale to the east which terminates the main street, and marks the traditional change of scale at the edges of Irish towns. The house retains its historic windows and original form and makes a strong contribution to the picturesque character of the street architecture which makes up the historic town of Swanlinbar.
9. Dwelling house built c. 1870. The website www.buildings ofireland.ie describes the building as- Corner-sited detached four-bay two-storey house, built c.1870. Extended to north-west c. 1920, with shop at ground floor having entrance in chamfered corner. Later lean-to to rear. Now disused. Pitched slate roof, hipped at north-west end, having parapet with shouldered semi-circular profile over chamfered corner. Clay ridge tiles with rendered chimneystacks to ridge, later chimney stack against east gable, replacement metal rainwater goods. Corrugated-iron roof to rear lean-to extending up to eaves level concealed by parapet on side elevation. Smooth rendered ruled-and-lined walls with raised quoins framing original extent of house. Two-over-two timber sash windows to front and corner at first floor with stone sills. One sash window to ground floor in original section alongside display window paired with sheeted door. Fixed timber display windows to corner section. Deep-set door to chamfered corner having half-round concrete canopy, rounded jambs with chamfer stops and three-panelled timber door with large upper panel glazed. Doors to eastern end and adjoining display window to centre of north elevation, both having sheeted doors with glazed panels. Opens directly on to street. Appraisal An eye-catching corner-sited building of vernacular origin, having a later corner section added in the early decades of the twentieth century. The timber sliding sash windows and curved corner gablet are notable features. The house is an excellent example of traditional urban architecture and adds to the town's historic character.
10. St. Mary’s Roman Catholic Church. The website https://www.swanlinbar.ie/st-marys-church/ states- St. Mary’s, Swanlinbar was 130 years old in 1958 (it was built in 1828 by Rev. Philip Kiernan to replace a thatched chapel in Gortacashel townland and renovated in 1927 and 1959) and was in urgent need of reconstruction. It was decided to enlarge and modernise the edifice and at the time incorporate the old church in the new structure. Most of the old church was incorporated in the renovated structure that was destroyed by a bomb on 8 December 1974. After this devastating blow, the decision was soon made to demolish the old church, damaged beyond repair and to erect a modern church, in terms of liturgical requirements, and yet standing favourable comparison with the building that had gone before. The new Saint Mary’s church was re-dedicated by Bishop Francis McKiernan on 15th August 1978. The website www.buildings ofireland.ie describes the building as- Freestanding fan-plan double-height Roman Catholic church, built 1978, with central projecting sanctuary in curved east elevation, clerestorey windows to front elevation over single-storey section rotated to face Chapel Square containing entrance lobby, sacristy to north-west and side chapel to south, belfry composed of four freestanding concrete columns in V-arrangement rising from sanctuary of side chapel, lower canopy on round columns across front elevation. Metal-sheeted roof to main church space of radiating timber-clad beams sloping upward from clerestory over entrance lobby to wider altar end with flush rooflights over sanctuary. Aluminium coping to parapets, flat roofs to canopy, entrance lobby, side chapel and sacristy. Roughcast rendered walls with smooth rendered plinth course. Round polished stone plaque within canopy inscribed 'ST MARY'S / CATHOLIC CHURCH / DEDICATED / 15TH AUGUST 1978 / BY / MOST REV / FRANCIS J. McKIERNAN D.D / BISHOP OF KILMORE'. Aluminium windows to clerestory, side chapel, and sacristy. Double-height angle-headed aluminium windows flanking wide end of church space. Vertical slit windows forming projection in sanctuary. Three timber doors open to canopy above single step. Acoustic ceiling panels on lateral purlins over radiating timber clad beams supported on engaged columns at narrow and wide ends of main church space. Painted fairfaced blockwork walls, stained glass to clerestorey and sanctuary of side chapel. Timber seating arranged in wedge-shaped blocks radiating from rectangular altar extending forward from sanctuary recess below four-sided rooflight shaft angled to underside between central beams. Set back streetline with pedestrian access via steel gates. Appraisal- A church of striking modern design built to replace an earlier structure destroyed in a bombing in 1976. Characteristic of the Modern style favoured by the Roman Catholic Church in the decades after the Second Vatican Council (1962-65), the design by Hubert Duffy is a composition of volumes reflecting the internal spatial arrangement with a Modernist belfry to add verticality to the composition and to mark the position of the church within the town. Following the precepts of the Modern Movement, structure and light are the central architectural features of the interior, with natural light introduced to highlight the altar and sanctuary as the central focus of the space. The church adds a notable twentieth-century layer to the predominantly eighteenth- and nineteenth-century streetscape of Swanlinbar.
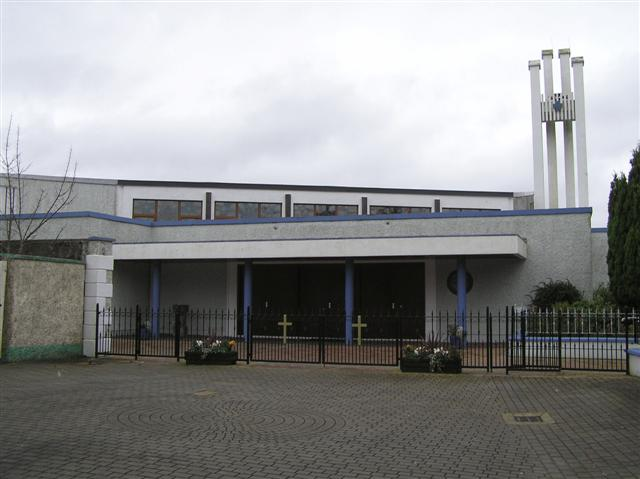
  Swanlinbar RC Church - geograph.org.uk - 1054716
