= Gorteennaglogh =

Townland in County Cavan, Ireland

Gorteennaglogh (Irish derived place name, Goirtín na gCloch, meaning 'The Little Field of the Stones') is a townland in the civil parish of Kinawley, barony of Tullyhaw, County Cavan, Ireland.

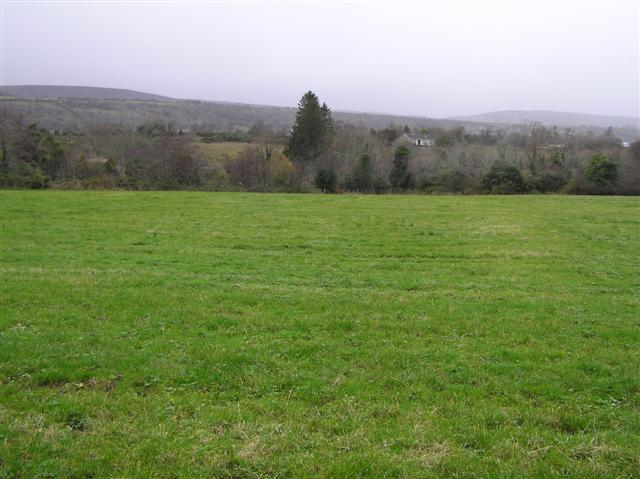
Gorteennaglough Townland - geograph.org.uk - 1054728

== Geography ==
Gorteennaglogh is bounded on the north by Monydoo (or Tonycrom) townland, on the south by Cornalon and Gubrimmaddera townlands, on the west by Aghaboy (Kinawley) and Gubnafarna townlands and on the east by Furnaceland and Hawkswood townlands. Its chief geographical features are the River Cladagh (Swanlinbar), mountain streams, a spring well and a dug well. Gorteennaglogh is traversed by minor public roads and rural lanes. The townland covers 116 statute acres.

== History ==
An Inquisition held at Belturbet on 12 June 1661 stated that on his death on 30 April 1643, Henry Croften of Mohill, County Leitrim, was in possession of, inter alia, one poll in Gortmeglogh and his son Henry Croften junior (born 1630) then took possession. The Crofton Estate papers are in the National Library of Ireland, MS 20,773-20,806 & D 26,886-27,010.

The 1652 Commonwealth Survey spells the name as Gorteenneclogh and lists the proprietor as Mr Thomas Worshipp and the tenants as Tiernan McHugh & others.

In a deed dated 28 July 1720 Morley Saunders granted to Richard Hassard- the lands of Gorteenaglogh now or late in the possession of John Downey & Richard Moran or one of them.

A deed by Thomas Enery dated 29 Jan 1735 includes the lands of Gurtineglough.

In a deed dated 13 August 1738 John Enery conveyed to Richard Hassard, the lands of Gortynaglough.

A deed dated 13 December 1774 by John Enery spells the townland as Gurteeneglough otherwise Gurteenaglough otherwise Gurtynaglough.

The 1790 Cavan Carvaghs List spells the name as-Gorteenaglogh.

The 1821 Census of Ireland spells the name as Gortnaglough and Gortenaglough and Gortnelaugh and states- Gortnelaugh contains 34 acres arable land & 13 acres bog.

The Tithe Applotment Books 1834 spell the name as Gorteenaglogh.

The 1836 Ordnance Survey Namebooks state- A corn kiln on the land. The soil is in general light and produces middling crops of oats, flax and potatoes. Freestone can be procured in any part of the land and is used for building.

The Gorteennaglogh Valuation Office Field books are available for 1838.

Griffith's Valuation lists thirteen landholders in the townland.

The landlord of Gorteenaglogh in the 19th century was the Hassard Estate.

== Census ==
Year	Population	Males	Females	Total Houses	Uninhabited
1841	72	32	40	15	0
1851	49	20	29	10	0
1861	57	27	30	10	0
1871	44	23	21	10	2
1881	43	22	21	7	1
1891	33	17	16	7	1

In the Census of Ireland 1821, there were eight families living in the townland.

In the 1901 census of Ireland, there were seven families listed in the townland.

In the 1911 census of Ireland, there were seven families listed in the townland.

== Antiquities ==
1. A 19th century corn-kiln.
2. Stepping-stones over the river
3. Stone bridges over the river
4. A lime-kiln
