= Kinawley =

Village in County Fermanagh, Northern Ireland

Coordinates: 54.226°N 7.65°W

Kinawley: Irish: Cill Náile
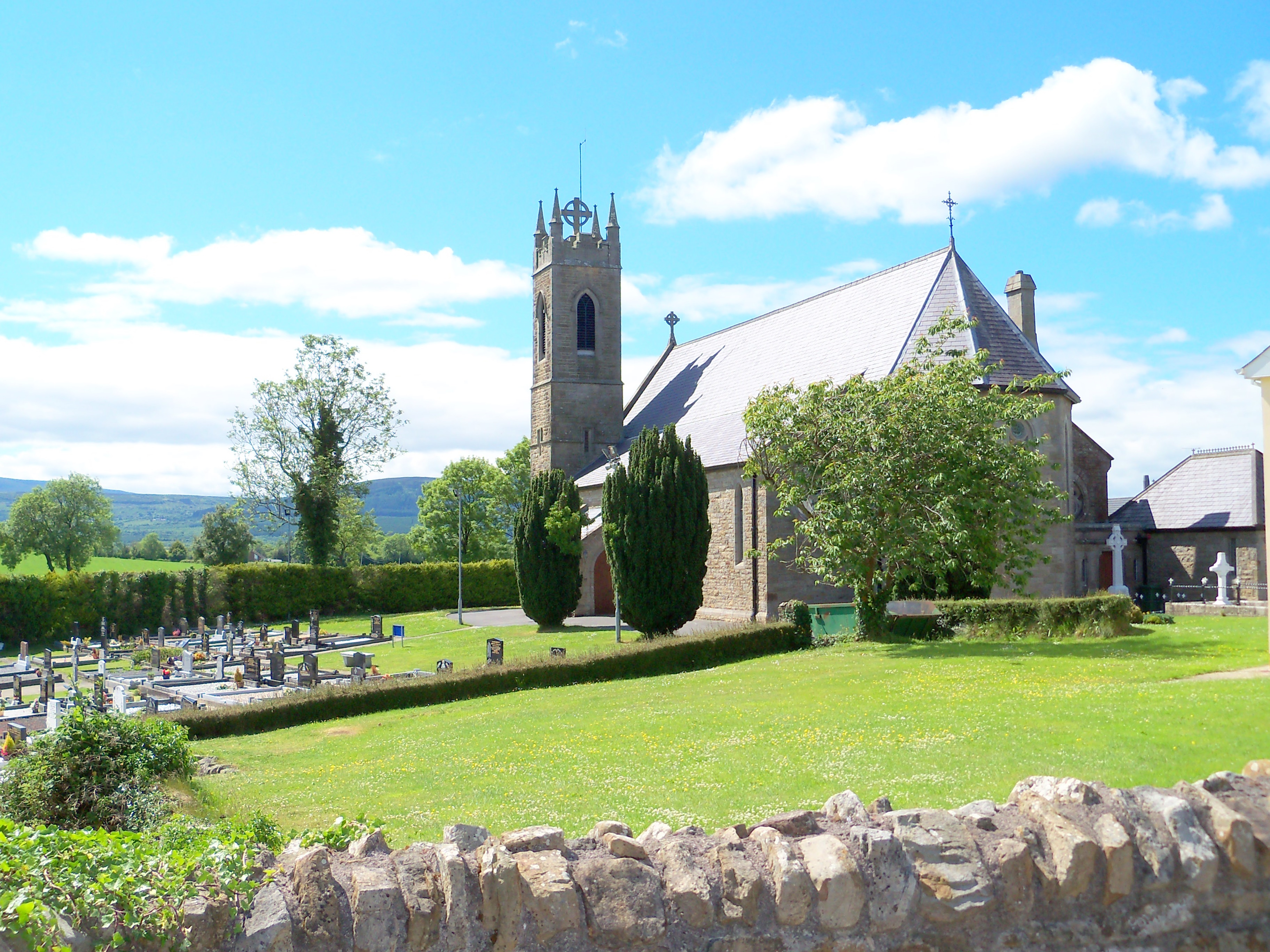
- St Naile's Church

- Location within Northern Ireland
- Population: 141 (2011 Census)
- District: Fermanagh and Omagh
- County: County Fermanagh
- Country: Northern Ireland
- Sovereign state: United Kingdom
- Post town: ENNISKILLEN
- Postcode district: BT92
- Dialling code: 028
- UK Parliament: Fermanagh and South Tyrone
- NI Assembly: Fermanagh and South Tyrone

Kinawley or Kinawly (from Irish Cill Náile, meaning 'Náile’s church') is a small village, townland (of 187 acres) and civil parish straddling County Fermanagh, Northern Ireland and County Cavan, Republic of Ireland. The village and townland are both in the civil parish of Kinawley (founded by Natalis of Ulster) in the historic barony of Clanawley, while other areas of the parish are in the baronies of Knockninny in County Fermanagh and Tullyhaw in County Cavan. In the 2011 Census it had a population of 141 people.

Kinawley has been twinned with the German Village of Ammerndorf a municipality in the district of Fürth within Bavaria in Germany since 2008 following the county of Fermanagh's "Green and Green alike" campaign assigning each village and town land with a similar counterpart to follow the example of an environmentally friendly living manner.

== Tullyhaw ==
The part of Kinawley lying in the barony of Tullyhaw comprises the following townlands: Aghaboy (Kinawley); Aghakinnigh; Aghnacally; Altbrean; Alteen; Binkeeragh; Borim (Kinawley); Cloghoge; Commas (Kinawley); Cornagran (Kinawley); Cornalon; Corranearty; Cullion (Kinawley); Derryrealt; Drumbar (Kinawley); Drumboory; Drumbrughas; Drumcanon (Kinawley); Drumcar (Kinawley); Drumcask; Drumconra (or Lowforge); Drumcullion; Drumersee; Drumod Glebe; Dunglave; Dunmakeever; Eshveagh; Finaghoo; Furnaceland; Gortacashel; Gorteen (Kinawley); Gorteennaglogh; Gortlaunaght; Gortnaderrylea; Gortnaleg; Gub (Kinawley); Gubnafarna; Gubrawully; Gubrimmaddera; Hawkswood; Killaghaduff; Knockranny; Knockroe (Kinawley); Legavreagra; Monydoo (or Tonycrom); Newtown (Kinawley); Sralahan (Kinawley); Tircahan; Tonanilt; Tonyquin; Tullycrafton; Tullydermot; Uragh (Kinawley).

== Churches ==
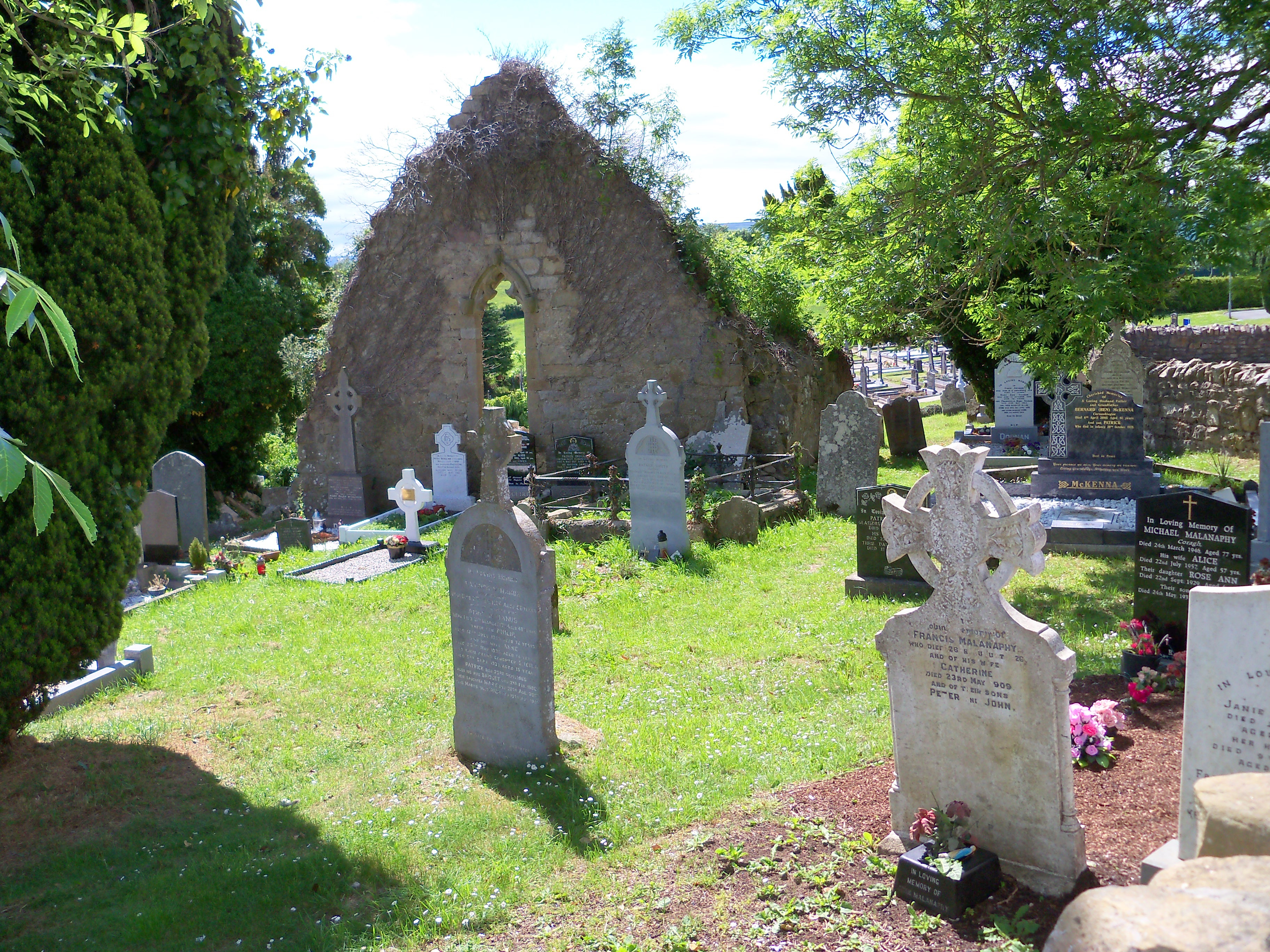
Ruins old church of Naile

St Naile's Church in the Parish of Kinawley, in the Diocese of Kilmore, was built between the years 1867–1876 near a site that was used for worship from the 6th century. It was rededicated on 4 August 2002.

The church is dedicated to Saint Náile (alias Saint Natalis), a contemporary of Saint Colmcille. St Naile became the second Abbott on Devinish, which was one of the great monastic settlements during the Golden Age of Christianity in Ireland. According to the 'Life of Saint Naile', the original Christian church of Kinawley parish was in Hawkswood townland, Swanlinbar village, and was founded by St. Ternoc. The Life states that Naile arranged a meeting with Saint Mogue (Máedóc of Ferns) at Cluain Caomh, which was the old name for Hawkswood. While he was waiting for Mogue to turn up, he asked St. Ternoc for a drink of water but was refused. Naile in anger hurled his staff three ploughlands (six tates or townlands) and where it landed a spring gushed forth and he founded his church there, where now stands the church of Kinawley and Naile's Holy Well. Oddly enough there are indeed six townlands between Hawkswood and Lismonaghan townland, Kinawley village, where St. Naile's church is situated today. The Life of Naile was composed c. 1520 from earlier sources and is probably a reflection of what originally happened, i.e. Hawkswood church was on the boundary between Tullyhaw or Magh Slécht (where Mogue was the patron saint) and Fermanagh. The Airgíalla were moving into the area and then took the overlordship of the church occupied by Ternoc and gave it to their own priests.

== Transport ==
Ulsterbus route 58 from Enniskillen to Belturbet serves Kinawley several times a day Mondays to Saturdays.

The Donegal-Enniskillen-Cavan-Dublin Airport-Dublin Bus Éireann Expressway route 30 serves Derrylin which is approximately 7 km distant. There is a coach in each direction every two hours during the day as well as an overnight journey. Services operate daily including Sundays.

== People ==
- Chief Superintendent Harry Breen, a senior RUC officer killed in the Jonesborough Ambush in March 1989. Breen was from the townland of Stragowna.
- John Carron, nationalist politician
- Owen Carron, activist and politician, from Kinawley
- Father Seán McManus, Irish National Caucus president

== See also ==
- Natalis of Ulster
- List of civil parishes of County Fermanagh
- List of townlands in County Fermanagh
- List of towns and villages in Northern Ireland
