= Natalis of Ulster =

Irish monk and saint, died 564

Natalis (Saint Naile, Naal) (died 564) was a 6th-century Irish monk and saint.

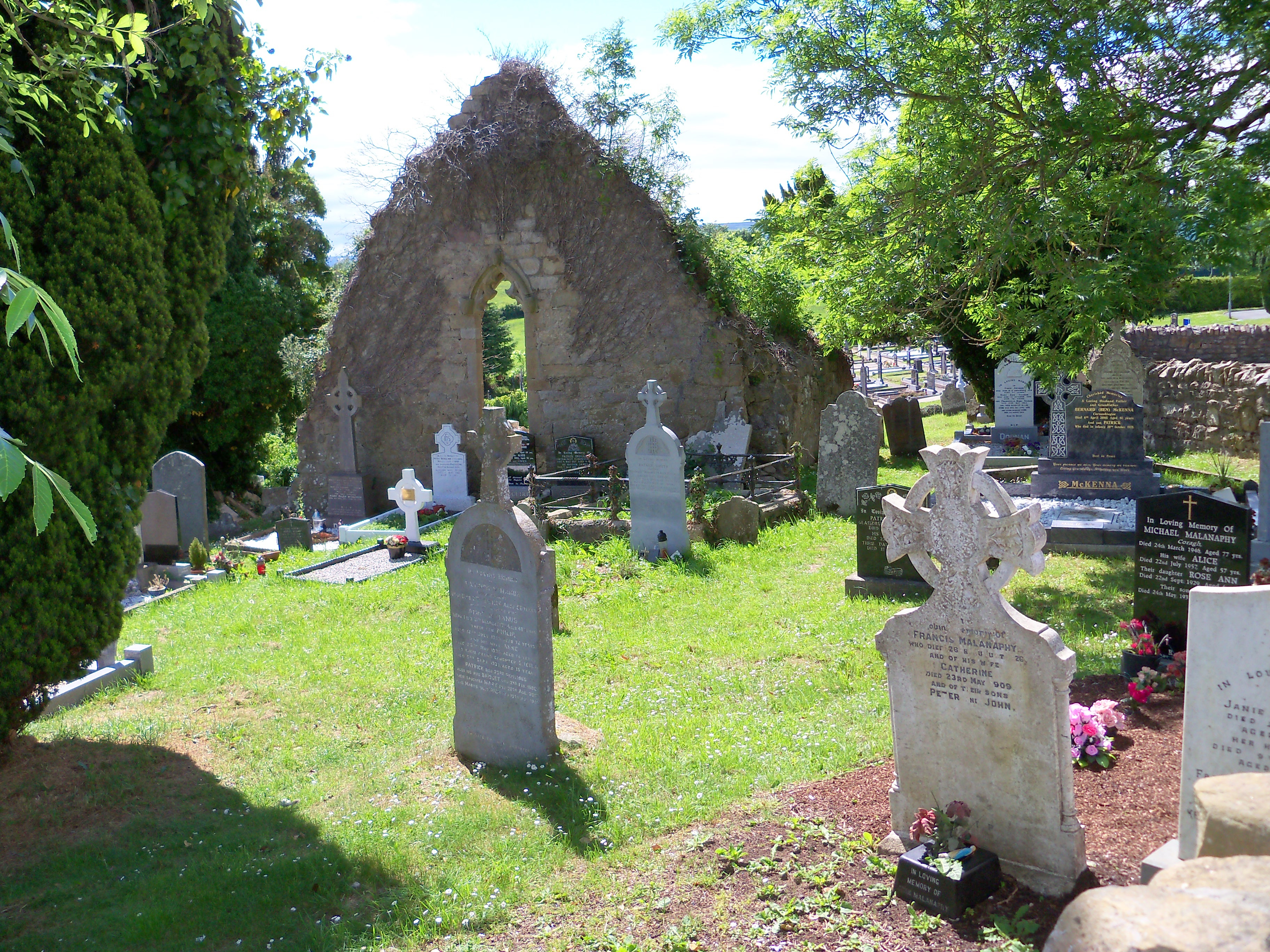
Ruins of the old church of Naile, Kinawley, County Fermanagh

His father was Aenghus, who was 3rd in descent from Lughaidh, King of Munster. He died in 564. He was a spiritual student of Columba and founded monasteries throughout Ulster, serving as an abbot at St Naul's Abbey, Inver (County Donegal), Kinawley (Cill Naile), Inver Naile (at Raphoe, County Donegal), and Devenish Island, where he succeeded Saint Molaise.

Saint Natalis is mentioned in the Topographia Hibernica, of Gerald of Wales, in the story of the "Werewolves of Ossory". In this narrative, the male werewolf claims that a pair of people from his village are transformed into wolves every seven years due to a retributive curse placed upon them by Natalis.

A well in his memory still exists beside Kinawley Church, where the handle of his bell was preserved up to the 19th century. A Life of Naile dating from c.1520 is found in 'Miscellanea hagiographica Hibernica: vitae adhuc ineditae sanctorum Mac Creiche, Naile, Cranat'.

Natalis' feast day is 27 January.

== See also ==
- Kinawley
