= Gortacashel =

Townland in County Cavan, Ireland

Gortacashel (Irish derived place name, Gort an Chaisil, meaning ‘The Field of the Stone Fort’) is a townland in the civil parish of Kinawley, barony of Tullyhaw, County Cavan, Ireland.

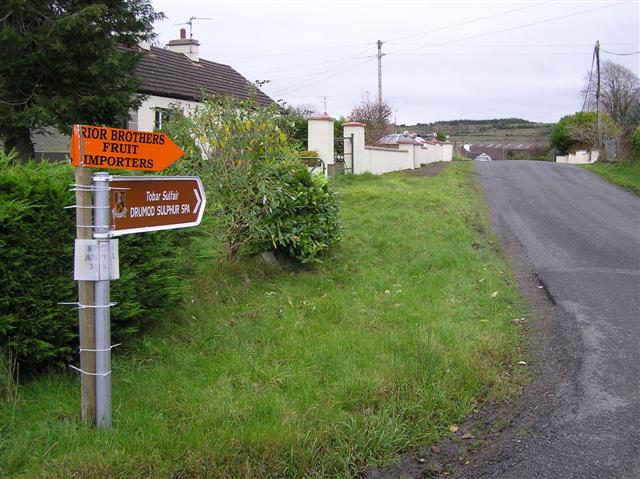
Road at Gortacashel - geograph.org.uk - 1054590

== Geography ==
Gortacashel is bounded on the north by Uragh (Kinawley) townland, on the south by Killaghaduff townland, on the west by Furnaceland townland and on the east by Drumod Glebe townland. Its chief geographical features are the Blackwater river which later joins the River Cladagh (Swanlinbar), a quarry and dug wells, including one called The Folly Well. Gortacashel is traversed by the local L1031 road, minor public roads and rural lanes. The townland covers 90 statute acres.

== History ==
In medieval times Gortacashel was owned by the McGovern Clan and formed part of a ballybetagh spelled (variously) Aghycloony, Aghcloone, Nacloone, Naclone and Noclone (Irish derived place name Áth Chluain, meaning ‘The Ford of the Meadow’). The 1609 Baronial Map depicts the ballybetagh as Naclone.

In the Plantation of Ulster by grant dated 26 June 1615, King James VI and I granted, inter alia, The precinct or parcel of Nacloone otherwise Aghcloone to Sir George Graeme and Sir Richard Graeme to form part of the Manor of Greame. A history of Richard and George Graham is viewable online. The Grahams took part in the Irish Rebellion of 1641 and after the war their lands were confiscated under the Act for the Settlement of Ireland 1652.

The 1652 Commonwealth Survey spells the townland as Gortcashell with the proprietor being Mr Thomas Worshipp and the tenan being Edmund Magwire.

In the Cavan Poll Book of 1761, there was one person registered to vote in Gortacashel in the Irish general election, 1761 - Robert Eccles esquire of County Fermanagh. He was entitled to cast two votes. The four election candidates were Charles Coote, 1st Earl of Bellomont and Lord Newtownbutler (later Brinsley Butler, 2nd Earl of Lanesborough), both of whom were then elected Member of Parliament for Cavan County. The losing candidates were George Montgomery (MP) of Ballyconnell and Barry Maxwell, 1st Earl of Farnham. Absence from the poll book either meant a resident did not vote or more likely was not a freeholder entitled to vote, which would mean most of the inhabitants of Gortacashel.

The 1790 Cavan Carvagh list spells the name as Gortacassell.

The 1821 Census of Ireland spells the name as Gortnacashel and Gartacashel and states- Farm containing 100 acres of excellent land on which stands a chapel.

The 1825 Tithe Applotment Books spell the name as Gortacashel.

In 1828 Patrick McGoldrick of Gortacashel was arrested for stabbing a man (the website mistakenly locates it in County Tyrone).

The Gortacashel Valuation Office Field books are available for August 1838.

Griffith's Valuation lists nine landholders in the townland.

The landlord of Gortacashel in the 1850s was the Gresson Estate.

Uragh National School was actually situated in the adjoining townland of Gortacashel.

== Census ==
Year	Population	Males	Females	Total Houses	Uninhabited
1841	24	12	12	6	0
1851	22	12	10	4	0
1861	16	9	7	4	0
1871	12	8	4	3	0
1881	6	4	2	2	0
1891	12	3	9	2	0

In the Census of Ireland 1821 there were nine households in the townland.

In the 1901 census of Ireland, there were three families listed in the townland.

In the 1911 census of Ireland, there were three families listed in the townland.

== Antiquities ==
1. Long Bridge, built c. 1860 to replace an earlier one of 1750. The website www.buildingsof Ireland.ie states- Double-arch sandstone bridge, built c.1860, over River Blackwater, consisting of principal arch over the main channel to east and smaller arch over side channel to west surviving from an earlier structure of c.1750. Wide segmental arch to east with soffit and abutments of squared and coursed stone, regular rock-faced voussoirs having dressed arris to arch ring. Earlier round arch to west, with rubble stone soffit and abutments, arch ring of irregular roughly dressed voussoirs. Squared and coursed spandrel and parapet to eastern section, rubble stone spandrel and battered walls to west section. Variety of parapet copings with rubblestone to earlier section, rock-faced blocks to later section, and replacement rounded cement coping to centre. Wing walls angled to approach roads directions. Appraisal- A narrow bridge of robust character, demonstrating the evolution of bridge building construction from the eighteenth to the nineteenth century. The rebuilding of the main arch is typical of the arterial drainage projects carried out by the Board of Works throughout the country, with a particular concentration in Lakeland counties, whereby multiple channelled rivers were rationalised into a single deeper channel to improve land drainage.
2. The ruins of a Roman Catholic chapel. It was a thatched building erected in the 18th century to replace the ruined chapel in the adjoining townland of Killaghaduff and it fell into disuse in 1828 when a new chapel was erected in Swanlinbar town in the townland of Hawkswood. The 1821 Census of Ireland states- Farm containing 100 acres of excellent land on which stands a chapel. The 1836 Ordnance Survey Namebooks state- the ruins of a R.C. chapel, which stands on the west side of the road from Baunboy to Swanlibar near the southern boundary of the townland. The 1938 Dúchas Collection has a story about why the chapel was erected so close to the original one- This Chapel of Cill Dubh or Cillduff as it is called was built in one night. It was in a very out of the way place so that the hunted priests could live in it betimes and say mass in it too. It had iron doors and iron windows, for there were iron mills in Swanlinbar in those days, and iron was cheap and very plentiful. The old name of Swanlinbar was "An Muileann Iarainn" There were so many men at the building of the church that when the last was leaving Killaduff the first man was at Kinawley five miles away. The first man at Kinawley left a good stone hammer behind him at the church. He sent back word from one to another the same way as Dan O'Connell alarmed all Ireland with the straws in one night. All stood still till it was handed down to the man at Kinawley. The priest, for some personal motive of revenge left this chapel, and got a little chapel built along the road where Pat Frank (McGoldrick) lived a few years ago. Later the priest got a grand new chapel built in Swanlinbar when the good times came for them.
3. Uragh Boys' National School, Roll No. 8,143. This was situated in Gortacashel townland, not in Uragh townland (Uragh Girls' School was situated in Furnaceland townland not in Uragh townland). In 1862 the headmaster of the boys’ school was John Maguire and the monitor was Thomas McGovern, both Roman Catholics. There were 124 pupils in the school, 43 were Church of Ireland and 81 were Roman Catholic. The Catholic pupils were taught the Roman Catholic Catechism on Wednesday and Friday from 3pm to 3:15pm and on Saturdays from 11am to 12 noon. In 1865 the teacher, a Roman Catholic, received an annual salary of £20-0s-0d. There were 108 boys. In 1874 the teacher, a Roman Catholic, received an annual salary of £24-6s-8d. There were 116 boys. In 1886 the teacher, a Roman Catholic, received an annual salary of £80-7s-6d. There were 102 boys. In 1890 there were 114 boys at the school. Folklore was collected at the school in the 1938 Dúchas collection.
4. A lime-kiln
5. A foot-bridge
