= Aghaboy, County Cavan =

Coordinates: 54.189°N 7.754°W

Aghaboy
- Townland
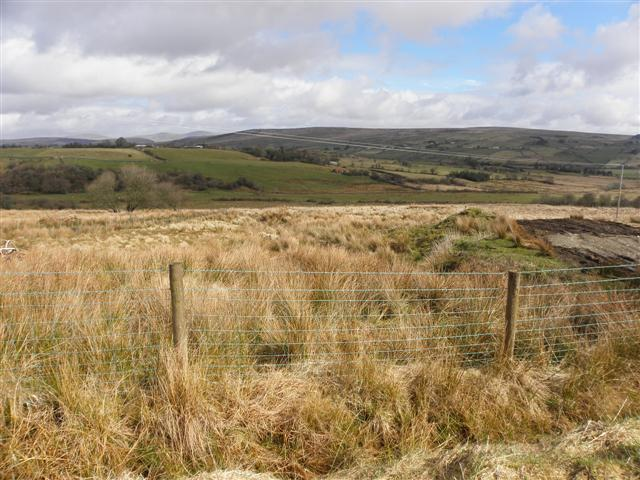

- Location within Ireland
- Country: Ireland
- County: County Cavan
- Barony: Tullyhaw
- Civil parish: Kinawley

Aghaboy (Irish derived place name, Achadh Buí, meaning ‘The Yellow Field’) is a townland in the civil parish of Kinawley, barony of Tullyhaw, County Cavan, Ireland.

== Geography ==
Aghaboy is bounded on the north by Monydoo (or Tonycrom) townland, on the west by Binkeeragh and Commas (Kinawley) townlands and on the east by Gorteennaglogh and Gubnafarna townlands. Its chief geographical features are Cuilcagh mountain on whose eastern side it lies, reaching a height of 1,208 feet; Pollnagollum Cave (Irish derived place name Poll na gColmán, meaning 'The Hole of the Pigeons') on the boundary with Binkeeragh townland; mountain streams; mountain pools; river swallowholes; caverns; a wood; spring wells and a dug well.

The Yorkshire Ramblers' Club said of Pollnagollum Cave, "A fine open pot masked by vegetation, N. wall 40 feet high. An easy scramble. Three passages, the longest 75 yards."

John Kelly, of the Geological Society of Dublin, wrote in 1855:

The upper part of the limestone occurs here, and there is a cave, called Pulgulm, or the Pigeon-hole, from which a subterranean mountain stream emerges, about which there are some fossils. In this cave the surface of the limestone has a high degree of polish, probably from the friction of particles contained in the muddy waters which flow through it in floods, and which flow down from the sandstone and argillaceous strata of the coal rocks.

Richard Griffith wrote in 1818:

If we except the cave of Dunmore, in the county of Kilkenny, which is mentioned in the Report on the Leinster coal district, none is more curious than the cave called Pulgulm, or the Pigeonhole, three miles to the south of Swanlinbar, in the county of Cavan. This cavern is narrow, but very lofty, and more than half a mile in length in a northern direction; in a southern direction it descends very rapidly. Its length was not ascertained, from the difficulty of proceeding. The lower, and many of the loose rocks which cover the bottom of the cave, are as highly polished on the surface as the most finished piece of marble. This must have been effected by the dropping of water: though water falling through the fissures of a limestone cavern usually forms calcareous stalactites from the roof, and calcareous incrustations on the sides. This is not the case at Pulgulm; the difference may be attributed to the flowing of the water directly from the colliery hills into the cavern and, meeting no limestone in the way, it is not likely to contain any thing but particles of sand and clay, the constant friction of which may have had the effect of polishing the surface of the limestone in the cavern.

Aghaboy is traversed by minor public roads and rural lanes. The townland covers 287 statute acres.

== History ==
In the 1609 Plantation of Ulster, Aghaboy formed part of the mountain of Cuilcagh which were granted to John Sandford of Castle Doe, County Donegal (the father-in-law of Thomas Guyllym of Ballyconnell) by letters patent dated 7 July 1613 (Pat. 11 James I – LXXI – 38, ‘Quilkagh’). It was later sold by Sandford to his wife's uncle Toby Caulfeild, 1st Baron Caulfeild, Master of the Ordnance and Caulfield had the sale confirmed by letters patent of 12 July 1620 (Pat. 19 James I. XI. 45 ‘‘Quilkagh’’).

The 1652 Commonwealth Survey spells the name as Aghaboyceanan (Irish derived place name, Achadh Buí Ceanan, meaning ‘The Baldfaced Yellow Field’) and lists the proprietor as Mr Thomas Worshipp and the tenants as Tiernan McHugh & others.

A deed by Thomas Enery dated 29 Jan 1735 includes the lands of Aughaboy.

A deed dated 13 December 1774 by John Enery spells the townland as Aughaboy.

The 1790 Cavan Carvaghs List spells the name as-Aghaboy.

The 1821 Census of Ireland spells the name as Aughaboy and states- containing 24 acres of arable land & limestone rock & also 200 acres of black mountain.

The Tithe Applotment Books 1834 spell the name as Aghaboy.

The Aghaboy Valuation Office Field books are available for 1838.

Griffith's Valuation lists twenty-two landholders in the townland.

The landlord of Aghaboy in the 19th century was the Hassard Estate.

Aghaboy folklore is found in the 1938 Dúchas folklore collection.

== Census ==
Year	Population	Males	Females	Total Houses	Uninhabited
1841	56	29	27	12	1
1851	52	32	20	9	0
1861	49	31	18	8	0
1871	43	25	18	8	1
1881	42	21	21	9	1
1891	45	19	26	7	0

In the Census of Ireland 1821, there were seven families living in the townland.

In the 1901 census of Ireland, there were eight families listed in the townland.

In the 1911 census of Ireland, there were seven families listed in the townland.

== Antiquities ==
1. Stepping-stones over the stream
2. A foot-bridge over the stream
3. Lime-kilns
4. Aghaboy 19th century Hedge-School. The 1938 Dúchas folklore collection states- A hedge-school was carried on in a field now owned by Mr James McGovern, Aughaboy, Swanlinbar, County Cavan. The last teacher in it was Miss McCairn. The school was held in a barn in Winter and under a hedge in the Summer. The stone on which the teacher sat is still pointed out. The children wrote with pointed quills and used ink made of the black buds of the elderberry. They also wrote on little boards with burnt sticks or pieces of lime. They sat on stones. The teachers were paid a penny a week by each child. In the Summer the teacher stayed in the farmers' houses-a week or a fortnight in each. In the Winter she stayed in a house near where she taught and some of the pupils brought her supplies. They were taught English, Arithmetic, Geography but no Irish. There was an old school in Aughaboy on the rock near Swanlinbar. John McGovern, Mary Byrne (Swanlinbar), Hannah & Annie Maguire (Gubrawoollly) taught in this school.
