= Swanlinbar =

Village in County Cavan, Ireland

Swanlinbar An Muileann Iarainn
- Village
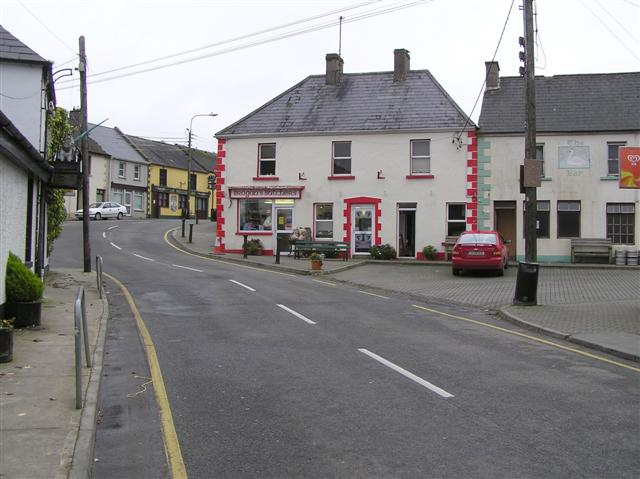
- Shops in Swanlinbar

- Location in Ireland
- Coordinates: 54°11′34″N 7°42′22″W
- Country: Ireland
- Province: Ulster
- County: Cavan

Population (2022)
  - Total: 222
- Irish Grid Reference: H190270

Swanlinbar (Irish: An Muileann Iarainn, meaning 'the iron mill'), referred to locally as Swad, is a small village on the N87 national secondary road in north-west County Cavan, Ireland, close to the Cladagh river and near the Fermanagh border.

The village is situated in the townlands of Furnaceland and Hawkswood, in the civil parish of Kinawley, in the barony of Tullyhaw. In the 1860s, Swanlinbar had the most celebrated of Cavan's numerous mineral springs.

== History ==
The earliest name recorded for the village was Sra-na-muck, which translates "The valley of the pigs". The current official Irish name An Muileann Iarainn, meaning "Iron Mill", reflects the foundation of an ironworks in the town. as does "Swanlinbar", which derives from the four entrepreneurs who built the iron foundry. A lease dated 27 February 1682 from Adam Loftus to Goodwin Swift, Robert Saunders, Richard Barry, and Richard Darling of lands in the area was the start of modern iron mining in the district. However iron smelting had been carried on in the area from as early as the Iron Age as recent discoveries in the nearby townland of Tonyquin attest.

Jonathan Swift in his 1728 essay, On Barbarous Denominations In Ireland, wrote:

"There is likewise a famous town, where the worst iron in the kingdom is made, and it is called Swandlingbar: the original of which name I shall explain, lest the antiquaries of future ages might be at a loss to derive it. It was a most witty conceit of four gentlemen, who ruined themselves with this iron project. 'Sw' stands for Swift (Swift's uncle, Godwin Swift, for whose memory he had no special regard, was the instigator of the ironworks and the person named. He lost his fortune due to the mismanagement of the business), 'And' stands for Sanders (Robert Saunders of Dublin), 'Ling' for Darling (Richard Darling of Dublin), and 'Bar' for Barry (Richard Barry). Methinks I see the four loggerheads sitting in consult, like Smectimnius, each gravely contributing a part of his own name, to make up one for their place in the iron-work; and could wish they had been hanged, as well as undone, for their wit."

The earliest mention of the town seems to be in the will of Richard Darling of Dublin City, dated 4 March 1706 (probate granted 30 November 1710),[Irish Genealogist, Vol I, No. 11, April 1942, pp. 335–337] which refers to- the iron works, land and town of Swanlingbar.

Another early mention of the town is in the will of Robert Saunders, a wealthy lawyer, landowner and politician, dated 8 March 1707, which states- I devise to my son Morley Saunders, my estate and interest in the Iron Works, lands and woods at Swanlingbar in the Countys of Cavan and Fermanagh.

By a deed dated 9 April 1711 by Richard Darling and Peter Ward, their share of the Swanlingbar Ironworks were granted, inter alia, to Morley Saunders. It is also mentioned in a lease dated 2 August 1714 where it is spelt Swanlingbar. The lessor was the aforementioned Morley Saunders (1671-1737).

In his 1732 book, A natural history of the parish of Killesher, the local rector Rev Wiliam Henry wrote that at the spa in Swanlinbar the local peasantry joined in the festivities with the visiting gentry. He described an idyllic picture of

:"the fine beau and the country girl with her hair plaited behind, the nice lady and the ploughman tilting most merrily together in a country dance by five o'clock in a morning, with the bagpiper playing tunes such as 'The Black Joke' or "Westmeath Election'".

By 1750 the name 'Swanlinbar' was the common usage. Reverend William Henry in his 1739 book "Upper Lough Erne" writes:

"The River Duanim or Stragownagh sweeps by the small market-town of Swanlinbar where once was a great iron-work. Some time ago there were forests of oak along the bank of this river; but they have been so entirely extirpated in order to supply the iron-works at Swanlinbar, that there is scarce a stump left."

However, some people still referred to the town as 'Swadlinbar' (or 'Swad' for short) and this name is mentioned in John Wesley's journal:

"Thursday 4th May 1769 — I found near Swadlinbar, as artless, as earnest, and as loving a people as even at Tonny-Lommon. About six I preached at the town's end, the very Papists appearing as attentive as the Protestants; and I doubt not thousands of these would soon be zealous Christians, were it not for their wretched Priests, who will not enter into the kingdom of God themselves, and diligently hinder those that would."

In the Cavan Poll Book of 1761, there were five people registered to vote in Swanlinbar in the Irish general election, 1761. Each person was entitled to cast two votes. The four election candidates were Charles Coote, 1st Earl of Bellomont and Lord Newtownbutler (later Brinsley Butler, 2nd Earl of Lanesborough), both of whom were then elected Member of Parliament for Cavan County. The losing candidates were George Montgomery (MP) of Ballyconnell and Barry Maxwell, 1st Earl of Farnham. Absence from the poll book either meant a resident did not vote or, more likely, was not a freeholder entitled to vote, which would mean most of the inhabitants of Swanlinbar.

In the 1778 Irish Relief of Insolvency Act, there is a reference to "Redmond Mc Manus of Swadling-bar in the county of Cavan, merchant".

The Post-Chaise Companion 1786 states-

"About half a mile from Swanlinbar is the famous spa; the waters of which are excellent for scurvey, nerves, low spirits and bad appetite. They are to be drank as the stomach can bear them, preparing first with gentle physic. You go to bed at ten, without supper, in the morning you appear at the spa well at 6, drink till 9, taking constant exercise, and breakfast a little after 10. At one you return to the well, and drink two or three glasses, returning home at 3, to be dressed for dinner at 4. There is no particular regimen necessary, but to be temperate in wine, and to drink as little Chinese tea as possible."

Poet George Sackville Cotter (1755–1831) wrote an amusing poem entitled "Epistles from Swanlinbar" in 1788, which recounts the adventures and upsets experienced by visitors to the Spa at Swanlinbar.

In the Fermanagh Poll of Electors 1788 there were two Swanlinbar residents, John Castle and John Willis, who were entitled to vote because Castle owned land in Gortoral townland in Kinawley parish and Willis owned land in Aghatirourke townland in Killesher parish.

John Jebb (bishop) the Protestant curate of Swanlinbar (1799-1801) wrote of his experiences there in a letter dated 18 January 1800. I began yesterday to write to you, when I was summoned, at no very seasonable hour, to visit a sick parishioner, through snow, and bog, and mountain. So disagreeable a walk I never before experienced. Some of the places through which I passed, were nearly impassable; and, to increase my annoyance, I was obliged to return, partly on foot, partly on horseback, through this bleak and marshy tract, in darkness and intense frost. However, I enjoyed the satisfaction of thinking I was discharging my duty.

Charles Coote in his 1802 "Statistical Survey of County Cavan", wrote-

"It is to be regretted that the ravages of the fire, which happened in the village of Swanlinbar above 15 years ago (i.e., in 1786), have not yet been repaired, in which 22 houses were destroyed. A great deal of harmony and sociability prevails in this retired watering place. The celebrated spa is in an ornamented enclosure, which is very handsomely improved with pleasant walks and neat plantations. The breakfast room is contiguous to the well, and here the company generally partake of this sociable meal, at the same table drink the waters, and ride or walk till dinner, when an excellent ordinary is provided".

In 1824 Bishop Jebb made a return visit to Swanlinbar but found it changed for the worse- at Swanlinbar, after an absence of three and twenty years, he met, with a pastor's feelings, some whom he had catechized, and others whom he had baptized; but the village itself, in his day a fashionable resort, had been long deserted as a watering-place, and was already fallen into decay.

The 1836 Ordnance Survey Namebooks state- In this townland is situated the town of Swanlinbar...This small town was in great repute about the year 1800 owing to the healing virtues of its spa water. But this has long ceased to please the public taste, and the town is at present little better than a country village.

Samuel Lewis in his Topographical Dictionary of 1837 states-

"SWANLINBAR, a post-town, in the parish of KinAwley, barony of Tullaghagh, county of Cavan, and province of Ulster, 8 miles (N.W.) from Ballyconnell, to which it has a penny-post; containing 398 inhabitants. This town is supposed to have derived its origin from a rich iron mine in the neighbouring mountain of Cuilcagh, which was worked at a remote period to a very considerable extent. The ore was smelted into pig iron in furnaces about half a mile distant, and manufactured into bars at some works erected upon a powerful mountain stream which flows through the village : these works were continued till all the timber of the mountains was consumed in smelting the ore, when they were necessarily abandoned. In 1786 a considerable part of the town was destroyed by an accidental fire, which consumed 22 houses. It now contains 79 houses, and is situated on the old road from Ballyconnell to Enniskillen, and surrounded by the wild mountains of the barony: it is chiefly distinguished for its mineral waters, which are strongly impregnated with sulphur, earth, sea salt and fossil alkali, and in their medicinal effect are both alterative [restorative] and diaphoretick and are esteemed highly efficacious as a restorative from debility. From April to September it is the resort of numbers of the gentry of the surrounding district. The spa is situated in an enclosure tastefully laid out in pleasant walks and embellished with thriving plantations."

By Claddagh's Banks is a book by Anthony Mckiernan about the history of Swanlinbar.

That's the Way is a book by Joe Prior about growing up in Swanlinbar in the 1950s

== Transport ==
Swanlinbar is served by three bus routes. Leydons Coaches operate route 930 linking Swanlinbar to Bawnboy, Ballyconnell, Belturbet, Cavan and Enniskillen. Ulsterbus route 192 provides a commuter service to Enniskillen with one morning and one evening journey each way Mondays to Saturdays inclusive. Thursday-only Bus Éireann route 464 links Swanlinbar to Enniskillen, Ballinamore and Carrigallen. Until mid-October 2012 Swanlinbar was served several times daily by Bus Éireann Expressway route 30. Until June 2011 Swanlinbar was served by Ulsterbus Goldline route 296 linking it to Longford and Omagh.

== Sport ==
The local Gaelic Athletic Association club is Swanlinbar St Mary's.

== Census ==
For other years see Furnaceland and Hawkswood.

| Year | Population | Males | Females | Total Houses | Uninhabited |
|---|---|---|---|---|---|
| 1831 | 398 | 187 | 211 | 79 | 11 |
| 1841 | 492 | 226 | 266 | 113 | 21 |
| 1851 | 406 | 203 | 203 | 76 | 6 |
| 1861 | 436 | 214 | 222 | 83 | 7 |
| 1871 | 314 | 156 | 158 | 67 | 1 |
| 1881 | 300 | 146 | 154 | 74 | 7 |
| 1891 | 402 | 179 | 223 | 84 | 6 |

== Notable people ==
- John Jebb, former Bishop of Limerick who was curate of Swanlinbar in 1799
- Michael McGovern, Northern Ireland International Goalkeeper
- Owen Roe McGovern, former Cavan Gaelic footballer
- Patrick McGovern, politician
- Thomas McGovern, former Roman Catholic Bishop of Harrisburg

== See also ==
- List of towns and villages in Ireland
