= River Cladagh (Swanlinbar) =

River in Counties Cavan and Fermanagh on the island of Ireland

Cladagh River Swanlinbar River
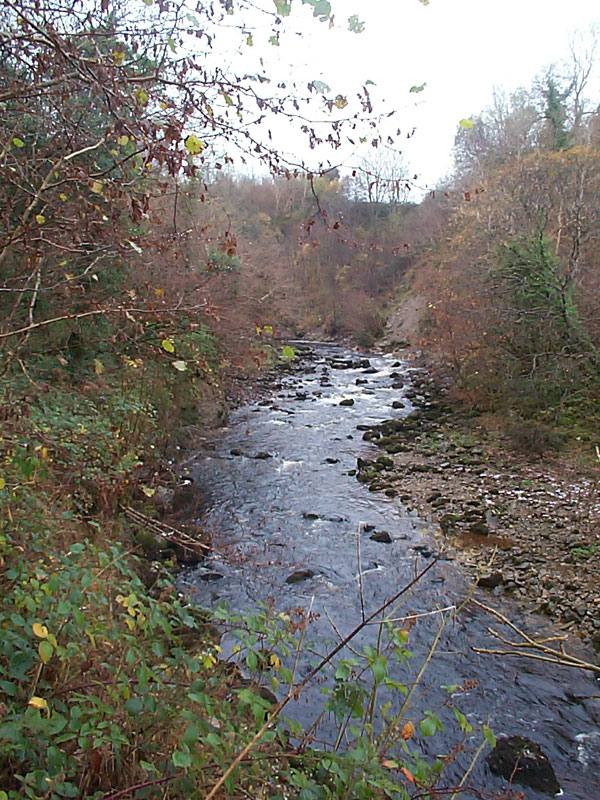
- Native name: An Chlaideach (Irish)

Location
- Country: Republic of Ireland, United Kingdom
- Province: Ulster
- Region: Northern Ireland
- Counties: County Cavan, County Fermanagh
- Village: Swanlinbar

Physical characteristics
- Source
  - location: Cuilcagh Mountain, County Cavan
- Source confluence
  - location: H143 259 Irish Grid
  - coordinates: 54°10′54.90″N 7°46′54.23″W
  - elevation: 265 m (869 ft)
- Mouth
  - location: Upper Lough Erne, County Fermanagh

The Cladagh River (Irish: An Chlaideach or "washing river"), Claddagh or Swanlinbar River, is a moderately large river which forms from a number of small streams rising in Commas townland on the south-eastern slopes of Cuilcagh Mountain, County Cavan, and flows through the village of Swanlinbar, before crossing the border into County Fermanagh and eventually flowing into Upper Lough Erne. It is ultra-oligotrophic upstream before gradually becoming oligotrophic and oligo-mesotrophic through its middle and lower reaches.

== Environment ==
The river is a designated Special Area of Conservation. The vegetation includes Ranunculetum fluitantis, Callitriche and Ranunculus peltatus. The river contains one of the largest surviving populations in Northern Ireland of the freshwater pearl mussel. The mussels, estimated to be a minimum of 10,000 in number, are confined to a 6 km (3.7 mi) stretch of undisturbed river in the middle section.

== See also ==
- Rivers of Ireland
- List of rivers of Ireland
