= Tircahan =

Townland in County Cavan, Ireland

Tircahan (Irish derived place name, either Tír Chatháin, meaning 'The Country of O'Cahan' or Tír na Cáin, meaning 'The Taxed Land') is a townland in the civil parish of Kinawley, barony of Tullyhaw, County Cavan, Ireland. It is also known as Rockwood.

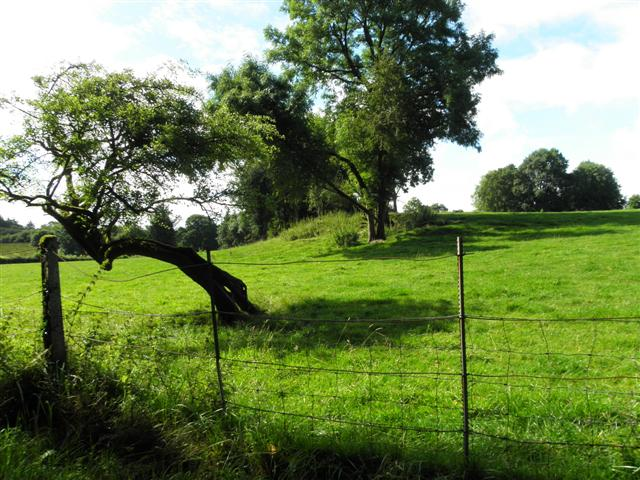
Tircahan Townland (geograph 3597245)

== Geography ==
Tircahan is bounded on the north by Gortlaunaght townland, on the west by Borim (Kinawley), Gorteen (Kinawley), Gortnaleg, and Killaghaduff townlands and on the east by Drumbar (Kinawley) and Newtown (Kinawley) townlands. Its chief geographical features are the Blackwater river which later flows into the River Cladagh (Swanlinbar), mountain streams, woods, a pool, water sink-holes, spring wells and a gravel pit. Tircahan is traversed by minor public roads and rural lanes. The townland covers 173 statute acres.

== History ==
The present day townland of Newtown (Kinawley) formed part of Tircahan until the 19th century.

In medieval times Tircahan was owned by the McGovern Clan and formed part of a ballybetagh spelled (variously) Aghycloony, Aghcloone, Nacloone, Naclone and Noclone (Irish derived place name Áth Chluain, meaning 'The Ford of the Meadow'). The 1609 Baronial Map depicts the ballybetagh as Naclone.

In the Plantation of Ulster by grant dated 26 June 1615, King James VI and I granted, inter alia, The precinct or parcel of Nacloone otherwise Aghcloone to Sir George Graeme and Sir Richard Graeme to form part of the Manor of Greame. A history of Richard and George Graham is viewable online. The Grahams took part in the Irish Rebellion of 1641 and after the war their lands were confiscated under the Act for the Settlement of Ireland 1652.

The 1652 Commonwealth Survey spells the name as Teerkahan and gives the owner as Mr Thomas Worshipp and the tenants as William Graham & others, so the Grahams had been reduced to tenant status.

In a deed dated 2 August 1714 Morley Saunders granted to Richard Hassard, inter alia,- the land of Teercahin.

A deed by Thomas Enery dated 29 Jan 1735 includes the lands of Teercan.

In a deed dated 13 August 1738 John Enery conveyed to Richard Hassard, inter alia, the lands of Tercahan.

A deed dated 13 December 1774 by John Enery spells the townland as Teercana otherwise Teercan.

In the Cavan Poll Book of 1761, there were two people registered to vote in Tircahan in the Irish general election, 1761 - William Johnston and John Johnston, both of Tircahan. They were each entitled to cast two votes. The four election candidates were Charles Coote, 1st Earl of Bellomont and Lord Newtownbutler (later Brinsley Butler, 2nd Earl of Lanesborough), both of whom were then elected Member of Parliament for Cavan County. The losing candidates were George Montgomery (MP) of Ballyconnell and Barry Maxwell, 1st Earl of Farnham. Absence from the poll book either meant a resident did not vote or more likely was not a freeholder entitled to vote, which would mean most of the inhabitants of Tircahan.

The 1790 Cavan Carvaghs list spells the name as Teercahan.

The 1821 Census of Ireland spells the name as Teercahan and states- 40 acres thereof black mountain & bog & 200 acres green pasture being part of a Sleavh Russel mountain. A part of same being in the Barony of Tullyhaw in the County of Cavan & also part in the Barony Nockninny Co Fermanagh. A mountain in which the foxes harbour & breed and there is a multitude of grouse thereon. On same land there is an excellent Lime Stone quarry.

The Tithe Applotment Books 1834 spell the name as Teercahan Upper and Teercahan Lower.

The 1836 Ordnance Survey Namesbooks state- There is a large house on east side of the old road from Swanlinbar to Bawnboy which passes through the west end of the townland called the Lodge. It is in a decayed state, occupied by the herd.

The Tircahan Valuation Office Field books are available for 1840.

On 23 March 1850 The Incumbered Estates Commission sold part of the Hassard estate, including Tircahan, on 29 April 1853 as follows-Sale of Incumbered Estates in Ireland, Notice to Claimants and Incumbrancers. In the Matter of the Estate of Francis Hassard, of Rockwood, in the County of Cavan, Owner, ex-parte William Thompson, Petitioner, Whereas, by an absolute Order, bearing date of the 23rd day of November, 1849, it was ordered, that the Lands of Rockwood, otherwise Tiercahan, situate in the Barony of Tullaha and County of Cavan; Gortnaleg, Upper and Lower, situate in same barony and county; Newtown, formerly part of Tiercahan, above-mentioned; Dunglave; Tonyquin; Gortmore; Gub, also called Gub Wallace; Maugherea, otherwise Moherre, otherwise Moherra; Finahoo; Cullion, otherwise Tawneanagra; All situate in the Barony of Tullaha and County of Cavan, should be sold for the purpose of discharging the incumbrances thereon. Now, all Persons claiming Estates or Interests on the said Premises, who may object to such Order are hereby informed that the Commissioners will hear any applications which any other person may desire to bring before them, on Notice, to be served at the Office, 14 Henrietta-Street, Dublin, within One Calendar Month from the date hereof. And all Persons claiming Charges or Incumbrances on the said Premises, or any part thereof, are required to lodge a brief statement of the Particulars thereof at the said Office, within two Calendar Months from the date hereof, and also to send their respective Addresses, in order that they may receive notice at what time and in what manner their claims should be established. Dated this 23rd day of March, 1850. S.Woulfe Flanagan, Secretary John Collum, Solicitor for the Petitioner, having the Carriage of the Sale--Offices, 70, Talbot-street. Dublin and Enniskillen.

The Incumbered Estates Commission sold part of the Hassard estate, including Tircahan, on 29 April 1853 as follows- Final notice to Claimants. Incumbered Estates Commission. In the Matter of the estate of Francis Hassard, Esquire, Owner, Ex-parte Adam Thompson, Executor of William Thompson, Petitioner. Take Notice, that the Commissioners have Sold the Lands of Rockwood, otherwise Tiercahan (Lower), Tircahan (Upper), Gertaleg (Upper), Dunglave (part of), Tonyquin, Newtown, Gortmore, Cullion, otherwise Tawneanagra, Gub or Gub Wallace, Finagho, or Finahoo, and Magherea otherwise Mohers, situate in the Barony of Tullyhaw, and County of Cavan, And the Draft Schedule of Incumbrances being lodged in the Office of the General Clerk, if any person have a claim not therein inserted, or any objection to said Schedule, particularly in respect of the Deeds mentioned in the Schedule hereto, or any lien on the purchase money, a statement, duly verified, of the particulars of such claim, objection, or lien, must be lodged by such person in said Office, on or before the Fourteenth day of June next, and on the following Monday at the Hour of eleven o'Clock A.M., Mountifort Lougfield, L.L.D., one of the Commissioners, will give directions for the final settlement of said Schedule. And you are to take notice, that, within the time aforesaid, any person may file an objection to any demand reported to you in the Draft Schedule. Schedule referred to by the foregoing notice: -- Deed dated 2nd June, 1759, being a Mortgage For £1500 by John Enery to William Crookshank. Deed dated 7th May, 1760, being an annuity granted to one Francis Enery, until the consideration money, £2000, paid off. Deed dated 1st October, 1763, whereby a term of years was created to raise £3,000, which was subsequently appointed to one Catherine Enery. Deed dated 21st December, 1771, being a Mortgage for £1,975 16s., by John Enery to George Tandy. Dated 29th day of April, 1853 Henry Carey, Secretary. {seal} John Collum, Solicitor, having carriage of the proceedings, 70, Talbot-street, Dublin.

Griffith's Valuation of 1857 lists seven landholders in the townland.

The landlords of Tircahan in the 1850s were William Magee and Robert Hutton.

On 17 March 1909 Thomas McGovern of Tircahan was murdered on St. Patrick's night. He was returning home with a few of his neighbours and they had some drink taken. It was supposed that they had an argument with the result that one of his companions stabbed him with his knife and he died about a week later.

Tircahan National School, Roll No. 7,769, was not actually in Tircahan townland. It was situated first in Drumbar (Kinawley) townland and later in Cullion (Kinawley) townland.

== Census ==
Year	Population	Males	Females	Total Houses	Uninhabited
1841	43	26	17	7	0
1851	43	24	19	6	0
1861	29	17	12	6	0
1871	33	14	19	6	0
1881	30	13	17	6	0
1891	34	14	20	8	0

In the 1821 Census of Ireland there were twenty-two households listed in the townland.

In the 1901 census of Ireland, there were ten families listed in the townland.

In the 1911 census of Ireland, there were six families listed in the townland.

== Antiquities ==
1. Tircahan Lodge. The 1836 Ordnance Survey Namesbooks state- There is a large house on east side of the old road from Swanlinbar to Bawnboy which passes through the west end of the townland called 'The Lodge'. It is in a decayed state, occupied by the herd. It was later rebuilt as the website 'www.buildingsofireland.ie' states- Detached T-plan two-storey three-bay house, built c.1890, with projecting centre bay having entrance to side, single-bay side elevations with single-storey canted bay windows, double-pile two-storey two-bay return to west with projecting entrance bay at inner corner to north and lean-to to rear. Now disused. Hipped slate roof with clay ridge tiles and projecting eaves having cast-iron rainwater goods on ashlar sandstone cornice. Rendered brick chimneystacks flanking centre bay, further central stacks to ridges of return, all with decorative octagonal pots. Lead-roll ridges to bay windows. Artificial slate roof to return with aluminium rainwater goods. Ruled-and-lined rendered walls with string courses to main block forming frieze below cornice and at eaves level of bay windows, bevelled rendered plinth course. Square-headed window openings, painted sandstone sills and two-over-two sash windows. One-over-one sash windows to canted bays. Three-over-three sash window to rear lean-to. Four panelled timber door to north of porch, with single-pane overlight in moulded surround on block plinths and approached by steps. Yard to north having two-storey slated and rendered outbuildings, predating house, retaining double-leaf timber doors and two-over-two sash windows. Wrought-iron gates to entrance. Appraisal- A substantial house dating to the turn of the twentieth century set within a landscaped demesne with associated outbuildings, some dating to the early nineteenth century. The current entrance drive lined with giant redwoods was laid out for the house and replaced an earlier approach from the west, now diverted north of the farmyard. The house is well composed and articulated with moulded detail and retains much of its original fabric including decorative chimney pots and historic windows. The yard and outbuildings survive their historic layout and appearance and enhance the context of the house. The entire ensemble demonstrates the affluence of a larger tenant or gentleman farmer at the close of the nineteenth century.
