= Drumod Glebe =

Townland in County Cavan, Ireland

Drumod Glebe (Irish and English derived place name, Droim Fhada, meaning the 'Long Hill-Ridge' and Glebe meaning 'Land for the Upkeep of the Church of Ireland Rector') is a townland in the civil parish of Kinawley, barony of Tullyhaw, County Cavan, Ireland.

== Geography ==
Drumod Glebe is bounded on the north by Uragh (Kinawley) townland, on the south by Gortnaderrylea and Killaghaduff townlands, on the west by Gortacashel townland and on the east by Drumbar (Kinawley) and Drumbrughas townlands. Its chief geographical features are streams, a rocky outcrop, a dug well and spring wells, including a sulphurous spa well, which is also a Holy Well. Drumod Glebe is traversed by minor public roads and rural lanes. The townland covers 76 statute acres.

== History ==
In medieval times Drumod Glebe was owned by the McGovern Clan and formed part of a ballybetagh spelled (variously) Aghycloony, Aghcloone, Nacloone, Naclone and Noclone (Irish derived place name Áth Chluain, meaning the 'Ford of the Meadow'). The 1609 Baronial Map depicts the ballybetagh as Naclone.

The townland was acquired by the Church of Ireland and was still owned by the local rector in the 1850s.

The 1658 Down Survey map depicts the townland as Dromate and a detached portion as Dromat.

The 1790 Cavan Carvagh list spells the name as Dromod.

The 1821 Census of Ireland spells the name as Drummod.

The 1825 Tithe Applotment Books spell the name as Drummode.

The Drumod Glebe Valuation Office Field books are available for August 1838.

Griffith's Valuation lists five landholders in the townland.

Folklore relating to Drumod is found in the 1938 Dúchas Collection.

== Census ==
Year	Population	Males	Females	Total Houses	Uninhabited
1841	28	10	18	5	0
1851	23	9	14	5	0
1861	18	10	8	4	0
1871	10	6	4	3	0
1881	10	2	8	3	0
1891	11	6	5	2	0

In the Census of Ireland 1821 there were five households in the townland.

In the 1901 census of Ireland, there were four families listed in the townland.

In the 1911 census of Ireland, there were three families listed in the townland.

== Antiquities ==
1. A Holy Well, which is also a sulphurous spa well. The 1938 Dúchas Collection states- There is another holy well in the Parish of Kinawley. It is situated in a field owned by Terence Owens, Dromod, Swanlinbar. It was also blessed by St. Naile and cures toothache, backache and warts.
