= Gortnaleg =

Townland in County Cavan, Ireland

Gortnaleg (Irish derived place name Gort na Lag, meaning 'The Field of the Hollows') is a townland in the civil parish of Kinawley, barony of Tullyhaw, County Cavan, Ireland.

== Geography ==
Gortnaleg is bounded on the north by Tircahan townland, on the west by Borim (Kinawley), Dunglave, and Gortlaunaght townlands and on the east by Cullion (Kinawley), Gub (Kinawley) and Newtown (Kinawley) townlands. Its chief geographical features are the Blackwater river which later flows into the River Cladagh (Swanlinbar), mountain streams, woods, a spring well and dug wells. Gortnaleg is traversed by minor public roads and rural lanes. The townland covers 170 statute acres.

== History ==
In medieval times Gortnaleg was owned by the McGovern Clan and formed part of a ballybetagh spelled (variously) Aghycloony, Aghcloone, Nacloone, Naclone and Noclone (Irish derived place name Áth Chluain, meaning 'The Ford of the Meadow'). The 1609 Baronial Map depicts the ballybetagh as Naclone.

In the Plantation of Ulster by grant dated 26 June 1615, King James VI and I granted, inter alia, The precinct or parcel of Nacloone otherwise Aghcloone to Sir George Graeme and Sir Richard Graeme to form part of the Manor of Greame. A history of Richard and George Graham is viewable online. The Grahams took part in the Irish Rebellion of 1641 and after the war their lands were confiscated under the Act for the Settlement of Ireland 1652.

The 1652 Commonwealth Survey spells the name as Gortneleg and gives the owner as Mr Thomas Worshipp and the tenants as William Graham & others, so the Grahams had been reduced to tenant status. In a deed dated 2 August 1714 Morley Saunders granted to Richard Hassard, inter alia, - the land of Gortnalegg. A deed by Thomas Enery dated 29 Jan 1735 includes the lands of Gortnelegg. In a deed dated 13 August 1738 John Enery conveyed to Richard Hassard, inter alia, the lands of Gortnaleg.

In 1766 Gortnaleg was one of the first Methodist communities founded in County Cavan. A Methodist Pioneer: or the Life and Labours of John Smith (1885), by Charles Henry Crookshank, states on page 196, "In 1766, however, in connection with the zealous and faithful labours of John Smith, a large number of Societies were formed, including those at Mullalougher, Killashandra, Bawnboy, Belturbet, Cavanagh, Ballyconnell, Swanlinbar, Furnaceland and Gortnaleg." Page 278 states, "Once when John Smith went to Gortnaleg, he was so hoarse that he could not speak above a whisper. He knew not what to do when he saw Peter Taylor's large barn filled with people hungering for the Bread of Life, and he groaned within himself. At length he said with intense earnestness: 'Lord, be Thou wisdom and utterance to Thy poor, weary, and afflicted servant, and speak by Thy Spirit to this people'. Immediately all the people fell on their knees and pleaded for a present blessing. Meanwhile, John Smith continued wrestling with God, until nineteen souls were led to the Saviour."

A deed dated 13 December 1774 by John Enery spells the townland as Gortnelegg otherwise Gortnalagg. The 1790 Cavan Carvaghs list spells the name as Gortnalieg. The 1821 Census of Ireland spells the name as Gartnalag. The Tithe Applotment Books 1834 spell the name as Gortnaleg Upper and Gortnaleg Lower.

The 1836 Ordnance Survey Namesbooks state, "Lime is procured and is burned, and sold in Swanlinbar from 1/0 to 1/6 per barrel. The soil is very good and produces excellent crops."

The Gortnaleg Valuation Office Field books are available for May 1840.

On 23 March 1850, The Encumbered Estates Commission sold part of the Hassard estate, including Gortnaleg, on 29 April 1853 as follows-Sale of Incumbered Estates in Ireland, Notice to Claimants and Incumbrancers. In the Matter of the Estate of Francis Hassard, of Rockwood, in the County of Cavan, Owner, ex-parte William Thompson, Petitioner, Whereas, by an absolute Order, bearing date of the 23rd day of November, 1849, it was ordered, that the Lands of Rockwood, otherwise Tiercahan, situate in the Barony of Tullaha and County of Cavan; Gortnaleg, Upper and Lower, situate in same barony and county; Newtown, formerly part of Tiercahan, above-mentioned; Dunglave; Tonyquin; Gortmore; Gub, also called Gub Wallace; Maugherea, otherwise Moherre, otherwise Moherra; Finahoo; Cullion, otherwise Tawneanagra; All situate in the Barony of Tullaha and County of Cavan, should be sold for the purpose of discharging the incumbrances thereon. Now, all Persons claiming Estates or Interests on the said Premises, who may object to such Order are hereby informed that the Commissioners will hear any applications which any other person may desire to bring before them, on Notice, to be served at the Office, 14 Henrietta-Street, Dublin, within One Calendar Month from the date hereof. And all Persons claiming Charges or Incumbrances on the said Premises, or any part thereof, are required to lodge a brief statement of the Particulars thereof at the said Office, within two Calendar Months from the date hereof, and also to send their respective Addresses, in order that they may receive notice at what time and in what manner their claims should be established. Dated this 23rd day of March, 1850. S.Woulfe Flanagan, Secretary John Collum, Solicitor for the Petitioner, having the Carriage of the Sale--Offices, 70, Talbot-street. Dublin and Enniskillen.

The Encumbered Estates Commission sold part of the Hassard estate, including Gortnaleg, on 29 April 1853 as follows: "Final notice to Claimants. Incumbered Estates Commission. In the Matter of the estate of Francis Hassard, Esquire, Owner, Ex-parte Adam Thompson, Executor of William Thompson, Petitioner. Take Notice, that the Commissioners have Sold the Lands of Rockwood, otherwise Tiercahan (Lower), Tircahan (Upper), Gertaleg (Upper) , Dunglave (part of), Tonyquin, Newtown, Gortmore, Cullion, otherwise Tawneanagra, Gub or Gub Wallace, Finagho, or Finahoo, and Magherea otherwise Mohers, situate in the Barony of Tullyhaw, and County of Cavan, And the Draft Schedule of Incumbrances being lodged in the Office of the General Clerk, if any person have a claim not therein inserted, or any objection to said Schedule, particularly in respect of the Deeds mentioned in the Schedule hereto, or any lien on the purchase money, a statement, duly verified, of the particulars of such claim, objection, or lien, must be lodged by such person in said Office, on or before the Fourteenth day of June next, and on the following Monday at the Hour of eleven o'Clock A.M., Mountifort Lougfield, L.L.D., one of the Commissioners, will give directions for the final settlement of said Schedule. And you are to take notice, that, within the time aforesaid, any person may file an objection to any demand reported to you in the Draft Schedule. Schedule referred to by the foregoing notice: — Deed dated 2nd June, 1759, being a Mortgage For £1500 by John Enery to William Crookshank. Deed dated 7th May, 1760, being an annuity granted to one Francis Enery, until the consideration money, £2000, paid off. Deed dated 1st October, 1763, whereby a term of years was created to raise £3,000, which was subsequently appointed to one Catherine Enery. Deed dated 21st December, 1771, being a Mortgage for £1,975 16s., by John Enery to George Tandy. Dated 29th day of April, 1853 Henry Carey, Secretary. {seal} John Collum, Solicitor, having carriage of the proceedings, 70, Talbot-street, Dublin."

Griffith's Valuation of 1857 lists nine landholders in the townland.

The landlord of Gortnaleg in the 1850s was Robert Hutton.

== Census ==
Year	Population	Males	Females	Total Houses	Uninhabited
1841	47	29	18	7	0
1851	37	19	18	6	0
1861	26	13	13	5	0
1871	37	19	18	7	0
1881	43	23	20	7	1
1891	41	22	19	6	1

In the 1821 Census of Ireland there were thirteen households listed in the townland.

In the 1901 census of Ireland, there were six families listed in the townland.

In the 1911 census of Ireland, there were six families listed in the townland.
