= Drumersee =

Townland in County Cavan, Ireland

Drumersee (Irish derived place name, either Droim ar Suí, meaning "The Hill-Ridge of the Seat" or Droim ar Saoi, meaning "The Hill-Ridge of the Learned Men" or Droim ar Sídhe, meaning "The Hill-Ridge of the Fairies") is a townland in the civil parish of Kinawley, barony of Tullyhaw, County Cavan, Ireland.

== Geography ==
Drumersee is bounded on the north by Caldragh townland, on the south by Aghakinnigh townland, on the west by Drumbar (Kinawley) and Greaghnafine townlands and on the east by Aghnacally and Gorgesh townlands. Its chief geographical features are mountain streams, forestry plantations, woods, a quarry, a spring well and dug wells. Drumersee is traversed by minor public roads and rural lanes. The townland covers 315 statute acres.

== History ==
In medieval times Drumersee was owned by the McGovern Clan and formed part of a ballybetagh spelled (variously) Aghycloony, Aghcloone, Nacloone, Naclone and Noclone (Irish derived place name Áth Chluain, meaning the ‘Ford of the Meadow’). The 1609 Baronial Map depicts the ballybetagh as Naclone.

In the Plantation of Ulster by grant dated 26 June 1615, King James VI and I granted, inter alia, The precinct or parcel of Nacloone otherwise Aghcloone to Sir George Graeme and Sir Richard Graeme to form part of the Manor of Greame. An Inquisition held at Cavan Town on 31 October 1627 found that Sir Richard Greames of Corrasmongan died on 7 November 1625 seized of, inter alia, one poll in Drymussy. His son and heir Thomas Greames was aged 40 (born 1585) and married. A history of Richard and George Graham is viewable online. The Grahams took part in the Irish Rebellion of 1641 and after the war their lands were confiscated under the Act for the Settlement of Ireland 1652.

The 1652 Commonwealth Survey spells the townland as Dromersee with the proprietor being Mr Thomas Worshipp and the tenant being Edmund Magwire.

In 1720 it was in the possession of Lord Wharton who sold it to Owen Wynne (1687–1756) of Hazelwood, County Sligo.

On 25 September 1742 Owen Wynne leased to James Herdman and George Spear, the lands of Drumersee and Aghnacally and the mears and bounds by which it was leased by William Armstrong. Lease to run for named lives renewable forever at annual rent of £31.

The 1790 Cavan Carvagh list spells the name as Drumershee.

The 1821 Census of Ireland spells the name as Drummerseer and Drummersee and Drumeersee and Drumminsee.

The 1825 Tithe Applotment Books spell the name as Drummercee.

A lease of Drumersee dated 1833 is in Cavan Library. Reference No. P017/0039, dated 24 December 1833 described as- Assignment made between Edward Whitely, Ballyconnell, County Cavan, gentleman, and Charles Magee, Tully, County Cavan, gentleman. Recites that by lease dated 25 September 1742 made between Owen Wynne, esquire, of one part, and James Herdman and George Spear, of the other part, in respect of the lands of Drumersee and Aghnacally (Aughnakelly) and the mears and bounds by which it was leased by William Armstrong, in the barony of Tullyhaw, County Cavan. Lease to run for named lives renewable forever at annual rent of £31 then currency of Ireland. Recites details of other deeds affecting the property. Now, in consideration of £800 sterling paid to Whitely by Magee, land is assigned.

Griffith's Valuation lists thirty-one landholders in the townland. The landlord of Drumersee in the 1850s was Anne Ahinleck.

== Census ==
Year	Population	Males	Females	Total Houses	Uninhabited
1841	144	76	68	25	0
1851	115	61	54	23	0
1861	109	54	55	19	0
1871	108	61	47	20	0
1881	100	56	44	21	0
1891	88	47	41	18	0

In the Census of Ireland 1821 there were thirty households in the townland.

In the 1901 census of Ireland, there were twenty families listed in the townland.

In the 1911 census of Ireland, there were eighteen families listed in the townland.

== Antiquities ==
1. Stone bridges across the river
2. A 19th century corn-kiln
3. Drumersee National School.
