= Drumbrughas =

Townooiland in County Cavan, Ireland

Drumbrughas (Irish derived place name, Droim Brughais, meaning the ‘Hill-Ridge of the Fort’) is a townland in the civil parish of Kinawley, barony of Tullyhaw, County Cavan, Ireland.

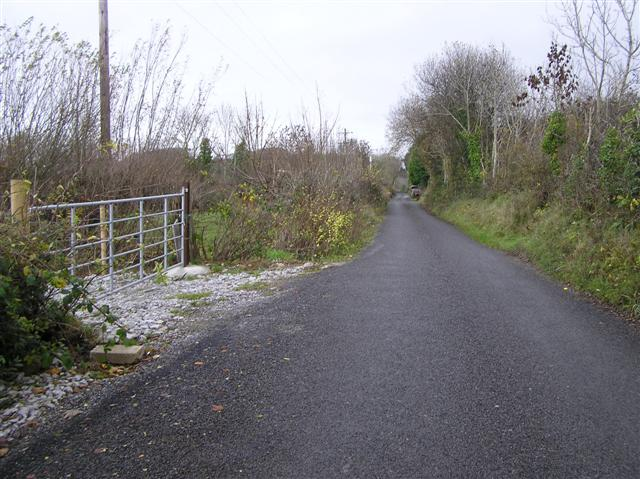
Road at Drumbrughas - geograph.org.uk - 1054595

== Geography ==
Drumbrughas is bounded on the north by Gortoral, Co. Fermanagh townland, on the south by Drumbar (Kinawley) townland, on the west by Drumod Glebe and Uragh (Kinawley) townlands and on the east by Greaghnafine, Co. Fermanagh townland. Its chief geographical features are mountain streams (The 1938 Dúchas folklore collection states- Tobar Ló - A name given to a stream flowing through the townland of Drumbrochas, Swanlinbar. Many years ago stations were performed at it but they are now discontinued.), a forestry plantation, a wood (The 1938 Dúchas folklore collection states- The Bonny Bush - a name given to a tree growing in a field in the townland of Drumbruchas, Swanlinbar owned by Mr James McBrien. It is said there is hidden treasure under it guarded by a fairy.), spring wells and a dug well. Drumbrughas is traversed by minor public roads and rural lanes. The townland covers 195 statute acres.

== History ==
In medieval times Drumbrughas was owned by the McGovern Clan and formed part of a ballybetagh spelled (variously) Aghycloony, Aghcloone, Nacloone, Naclone and Noclone (Irish derived place name Áth Chluain, meaning the ‘Ford of the Meadow’). The 1609 Baronial Map depicts the ballybetagh as Naclone.

On 12 November 1590 Queen Elizabeth I of England granted a pardon (No. 5489) to Gerald m'Shane O'Reighlie, of Drumbrughus, husbandman for fighting against the Queen's forces, but it is unclear whether this refers to Drubrughas, Kinawley or Drumbrughas in Drumlane parish.

In the Plantation of Ulster by grant dated 26 June 1615, King James VI and I granted, inter alia, The precinct or parcel of Nacloone otherwise Aghcloone to Sir George Graeme and Sir Richard Graeme to form part of the Manor of Greame. An Inquisition held at Cavan Town on 31 October 1627 found that Sir Richard Greames of Corrasmongan died on 7 November 1625 seized of, inter alia, one poll in Drombochus. His son and heir Thomas Greames was aged 40 (born 1585) and married. A history of Richard and George Graham is viewable online. The Grahams took part in the Irish Rebellion of 1641 and after the war their lands were confiscated under the Act for the Settlement of Ireland 1652.

The 1652 Commonwealth Survey spells the townland as Drombrughus with the proprietor being Mr Thomas Worshipp and the tenant being Edmond Magwire & others.

A deed dated 9 December 1710 From Ralph Darling and Adam Darling (the sons of Richard Darling, one of the founders of Swanlinbar town) assigned, inter alia, their half share in Drumbrochos to Peter Ward, a merchant of Dublin.

By deed dated 9 April 1711 the aforesaid Peter Ward assigned his interest under above deed of 9 December 1710 to Morley Saunders.

The 1790 Cavan Carvagh list spells the name as Drumbruhlis.

The 1821 Census of Ireland spells the name as Drumbolus and Drumbohis and Drumbolis and states- Said townland containing 125 acres of arable ground & pasture.

The 1825 Tithe Applotment Books spell the name as Drumbrochus.

The Drumbrughas Valuation Office Field books are available for 1838-1840.

Griffith's Valuation lists sixteen landholders in the townland.

The landlord of Drumbrughas in the 1850s was the Gresson Estate.

Folklore about Drumbrughas is found in the 1938 Dúchas collection.

== Census ==
Year	Population	Males	Females	Total Houses	Uninhabited
1841	78	43	35	16	2
1851	61	31	30	14	0
1861	58	23	35	14	1
1871	66	24	42	14	0
1881	66	29	37	15	2
1891	60	26	34	16	0

In the Census of Ireland 1821 there were twenty-one households in the townland.

In the 1901 census of Ireland, there were fourteen families listed in the townland.

In the 1911 census of Ireland, there were seventeen families listed in the townland.

== Antiquities ==
1. A medieval earthen ringfort, from which the townland got its name. The 'Archaeological Inventory of County Cavan', Site No. 574, (Dublin: Stationery Office, 1995) states- Raised circular area (int. diam. 31.6m) enclosed by an earthen bank and a wide, deep, waterlogged fosse which is barely discernible from ESE-S-W and almost completely infilled at W. Break in bank with accompanying causeway at NE represents original entrance.
