= Drumbar (Kinawley) =

Townland in barony of Tullyhaw, County Cavan, Ireland

- Townland
- Location in Ireland
- Coordinates: 54°10′42″N 7°40′51″W
- Country: Ireland
- County: County Cavan
- Parish: Kinawley

Drumbar (Irish derived place name Droim Bairr, meaning the ‘Ridge of the Summit’) is a townland in the civil parish of Kinawley, barony of Tullyhaw, County Cavan, Ireland.

== Geography ==
Drumbar is bounded on the north by Drumbrughas and Greaghnafine townlands, on the south by Aghakinnigh, Cullion (Kinawley), Newtown (Kinawley) and Tircahan townlands, on the west by Drumod Glebe, Gortlaunaght, Gortnaderrylea and Tonyquin townlands and on the east by Drumersee townland. Its chief geographical features are a hill that reaches a height of 486 feet, mountain streams, forestry plantations, dug wells and spring wells. Drumbar is traversed by minor public roads and rural lanes. The townland covers 309 statute acres.

== History ==
In medieval times Drumbar was owned by the McGovern Clan and formed part of a ballybetagh spelled (variously) Aghycloony, Aghcloone, Nacloone, Naclone and Noclone (Irish derived place name Áth Chluain, meaning the ‘Ford of the Meadow’). The 1609 Baronial Map depicts the ballybetagh as Naclone.

In the Plantation of Ulster by grant dated 26 June 1615, King James VI and I granted, inter alia, The precinct or parcel of Nacloone otherwise Aghcloone to Sir George Graeme and Sir Richard Graeme to form part of the Manor of Greame. A history of Richard and George Graham is viewable online. The Grahams took part in the Irish Rebellion of 1641 and after the war their lands were confiscated under the Act for the Settlement of Ireland 1652.

The 1652 Commonwealth Survey spells the townland as Drombarre with the proprietor being Mr Thomas Worshipp and the tenants being Edmond Magwire & others.

The 1790 Cavan Carvagh list spells the name as Drumbarr.

The 1821 Census of Ireland spells the name as Drumbar.

The 1825 Tithe Applotment Books spell the name as Drumbar Upper and Drumbar Lower.

The Drumbar Valuation Office Field books are available for August 1838.

Griffith's Valuation lists thirteen landholders in the townland.

The townland formed part of the Crofton estate in the 19th century. The Crofton Estate papers are in the National Library of Ireland, MS 20,773-20,806 & D 26,886-27,010 and in the Public Records Office of Northern Ireland at reference Number D-3480add.

A notable native of the townland was Thomas McGovern (bishop), the second bishop of the Roman Catholic Diocese of Harrisburg, Pennsylvania, USA.

Drumbar folklore can be found in the 1938 Dúchas collection.

The artist Patricia McKenna has made artworks about her ancestors home in Drumbar.

== Census ==
Year	Population	Males	Females	Total Houses	Uninhabited
1841	146	61	85	21	0
1851	83	39	44	16	0
1861	71	34	37	14	0
1871	66	30	36	13	0
1881	63	23	40	14	1
1891	36	18	18	11	1

In the Census of Ireland 1821 there were twenty-two households in the townland.

In the 1901 census of Ireland, there were ten families listed in the townland.

In the 1911 census of Ireland, there were eleven families listed in the townland.

== Antiquities ==
1. A medieval earthen ringfort. The 'Archaeological Inventory of County Cavan', Site No. 558, (Dublin: Stationery Office, 1995) states- Raised circular area (int. diam. c. 50m) enclosed by an earthen bank and the remains of a fosse which is bounded by a stream from W-N. From E-S-W bank has been modified and incorporated into the field boundary. A modern field boundary running NNW-SSE divides the site into two roughly equal portions. Original entrance not recognisable. Folklore about this fort is found in the 1938 Dúchas Collection.
2. A foot-bridge over the stream
3. Drumbar 19th century hedge-schools. The 1821 Census of Ireland states- Pat McHugh, schoolmaster, teaches 20 boys & 11 girls on his said lands in Drumbar. Tircahan National School, Roll No. 7,769, was not actually in Tircahan townland. Griffith's Valuation of 1857 situates it in the neighbouring townland of Newtown (Kinawley) but the attached map actually shows it in the adjoining townland of Drumbar. The 1913 Ordnance Survey 25" map shows it as a new building situated in Cullion townland. In 1862 the headmaster was John O'Brien, a Roman Catholic who received an annual salary of £25-5s. There were 102 pupils in the school, 42 were Church of Ireland and 60 were Roman Catholic. There were 58 boys and 44 girls. The Catholic pupils were taught Prayer and the Roman Catholic Catechism on Saturdays from 12 noon to 12:30pm and then the Church of Ireland pupils were taught their Catechism from 12:30pm to 1pm. In 1874 the headmaster, a Roman Catholic, received an annual salary of £28-16s-8d. There were 88 pupils, 54 boys and 34 girls. In 1886 the headmaster, a Roman Catholic, received an annual salary of £59-14s-0d. There were 78 pupils, 46 boys and 32 girls. In 1890 there were 81 pupils. Folklore was collected in the school in the 1938 Dúchas collection.

The Dúchas collection has a story about the aforementioned teacher, John O'Brien- There was another school in Drumbar. McCaffery gave the place of it free. The teacher, a man from Drumshambo whose name was John O'Brien, built it with his own two hands. There was any amount of stones in Drumbar and he got them free. Some of the neighbours carried them on their backs to him because carts were scarce in these days, and some gave him half a crown. Here is the way O'Brien lit on that spot for his school. He was teaching from one hedge school to another. This place was a sheltry one and he was walking past one day when he spied a bit of oaten cake on the ground. He sat and ate for he thought it was left there for luck and sure enough he had luck in the building for he never got a 'bac' in it, from the beginning to the end. He built it of rough stones without any mortar and thatched it with rushes. Every one who went to the school had to bring two turf, and there was always a good fire. John O'Brien was a strange character. His mother fell out with her own people and carried him on her back from the Midlands, to Drumshambo and then to Swanlinbar. She begged her way, and always said she'd make a priest or a schoolmaster of him. He was always a great learner, and had a great head for sums. He was a good whistler, a good singer and fiddler and was very fond of dancing and singing. If a young fellow passed by his house without singing or whistling he'd curse him for a druim an drú. Father John McGauran of Corlough told me he was at school with O'Brien before he went to Cavan College and that he got a ground work in Mathematics that placed him on top at all his exams in the college. Peter Drum of Drummersee, Peter, Hugh and Patrick McGovern, Gortnaleg were taught by O'Brien in the school at Drumbar. These joined the R.I.C. and the inspectors in each case asked what teacher was it taught them. Some of these rose to the rank of County Inspectors. O'Brien was a medium sized man with a long golden beard. He had an odious temper and would curse the children with all his might. He'd pray for them to be burning in the blue blazes of hell ten times a day. If a pair fell out, he'd take them out to the yard and make them box it out and be done with it. This happened nearly every day. The lads used to go to school in these days till they were man able. They wore white sleeved waistcoats, "courdaroy" trousers, shirts made from flax, and nether shoe nor sock. Every one had a few collops of oaten bread with him in his pockets to school. He used to kick the children and he had such a temper, he'd kill them if they would not get out of the school and run for their lives. In the Summer time he used to go away to Meath to work on farms. He was coming back home one day and was travelling through the country all day long. He was dead out, and he went into a house for a drink. The good woman told him there was a shough outside. He went to a second, and a third to be told the same story. There were no shops in those days. Well he went into a fourth and the woman gave him a drink and asked him to sit down and take some dinner. He did so and asked her where she was from. She said Cavan. He went down on his two bare knees and gave his seven curses to all the women of Ireland except those of County Cavan. He often prayed for the curse of God to fall on any one called McGuire, and for the race to be extinguished root and branch for "his heart was broken trying to teach them". They were all very stupid. He used to go around all the houses to see who kept a tidy house, and God help any one who was a "clatty trail". He visited all newly married people to see was the newcomer "clatty" or clean. If she were "clatty" that was his last visit: if she were clean he praised her in every place he went, and he praised all belonging to her too, and he visited her often. People were honoured by his visits for he was very interesting and good sport. He was good natured and very very kind to any one in sickness or trouble. Brigid McGovern told me this story. About fifty years ago (1888) she was a young married woman with four children one of whom was very sick. The good man went to the fair in Swanlinbar and promised to be home early. Twelve o'clock came and no man came. O'Brien called in to see the child and said he was going to the fair and would put the man out home-which he did and left him out a quarter of a mile. O'Brien called that evening again to see the child. The man was there and he says to O'Brien "Where you in the fair I never seen you" "The devil blind you and may you never see me or any other one" replied O'Brien. Out with him out of the house without another word and away with him his best. He was no time gone till he was back again to hear how the child was. He sat down, took tea, and made a long caily. He had a very large family. They were all very wild, very fond of music and dancing. They all emigrated to America, to Australia except one girl who is teaching in Co. Fermanagh but who is going out in pension this year. If a neighbour was making hay he'd send out a half dozen of big boys to give a hand at it in the middle of the day (from school). In the Spring time he often sent out a few children to gather "brosna" for a Brigid McGovern who lived in Drumbar beside the school. He died a very happy death when he was a few years over seventy. Kidney trouble caused it. He loved the Fenians, he loved Ireland and hated and cursed England every day he rose. During the Boer War he prayed every day that " the curse of God English might be swept into hell root and branch". He taught for a short time in Tiercahan and the day he left he gave the children a great feast of sweets, buns, loaf and tea. He was a great prayer and taught the children many and many a nice prayer. Here is one of them:-

There are four corners on my bed

There are four angels on its spread

Saint Matthew, Mark, Luke and John

God bless the bed that I lie on.
