= Legavreagra =

Townland in County Cavan, Ireland

Legavreagra (Irish derived place name, Lag na bhFreagra, meaning 'The Hollow of the Echoes') is a townland in the civil parish of Kinawley, barony of Tullyhaw, County Cavan, Ireland.

== Geography ==
Legavreagra is bounded on the west by Aghakinnigh townland and on the east by Aghnacally, Carrowmore, County Cavan and Mullanacre Upper townlands. It forms part of the Slieve Rushen Bog Natural Heritage Area. Its chief geographical features are Slieve Rushen mountain on whose north-western slope it lies, reaching a height of 1,279 feet; Pollnagollum cave (Irish derived place name Poll na gColmán, meaning 'The Hole of the Pigeons') which is a pot hole with a floor 70 feet deep; Tory Cave (Irish derived place name Tóraí, meaning 'The Cave of the Outlaws') which is a muddy bedding-plane associated with the Lughnasadh celebrations.; Loughan Macmartin mountain lake; Taylor's Lough (The 1938 Dúchas folklore collection states- In the townland of Legavegra is a small lake called Taylor's Lough and this is how it got its name :- Years ago there lived a bailiff in Aughnakelly who was a very severe man on the tenants of the surrounding estate. At last they met secretly and decided to kill him and they drew lots as to who should do the deed. One night as bailiff Taylor was coming over Sleive Russell from Ballyconnell or Cavan, two men met him and choked him by stuffing moss down his throat. When he was dead they threw his body into the lough and ever since it has been called Taylor's Lough); mountain streams; a waterfall; forestry plantations and a spring well. Legavreagra is traversed by minor public roads and rural lanes. The townland covers 472 statute acres.

== History ==
Up until the 19th century, Legavreagra was a sub-division of Aghnacally townland and its history is the same until then.

Cavan Library holds several leases relating to Legavreagra. (A) Reference No. P017/0034, dated 7 October 1827 described as- Renewal of lease made between Joshua Taylor, Killniglare, gentleman, and Edward Whitely, Ballyconnell, esquire, both County Cavan, of the one part, and Moses Netterfield, Ballyconnell, County Cavan, gentleman. Recites that by indenture of lease dated 20 November 1824 made between same parties, Taylor and Whitely leased to Netterfield the lands of Aughnakilly, parish of Kinawly, County Cavan; sub-denomination of Aghnacally (Aughnakilly) called Legavreagra (Legauregra), for three named lives with covenant for perpetual renewal. Rent of £45.10.0 late currency. One of the lives named has died and renewal now granted with insertion of life of James Spear, son of John Spear, Tullybrien, County Tyrone, gentleman, aged 16 years. Annual rent of £42 sterling present currency being equal to £45.10.0 late currency. (B) Reference No. P017/0039, dated 24 December 1833 described as- Assignment made between Edward Whitely, Ballyconnell, County Cavan, gentleman, and Charles Magee, Tully, County Cavan, gentleman. Recites that by lease dated 25 September 1742 made between Owen Wynne, esquire, of one part, and James Herdman and George Spear, of the other part, in respect of the lands of Drumersee and Aghnacally (Aughnakelly) and the mears and bounds by which it was leased by William Armstrong, in the barony of Tullyhaw, County Cavan. Lease to run for named lives renewable forever at annual rent of £31 then currency of Ireland. Recites details of other deeds affecting the property. Now, in consideration of £800 sterling paid to Whitely by Magee, land is assigned. (C) Reference No. P017/0040, dated 7 March 1834 described as- Lease made between Charles Magee, Tully, county Cavan, gentleman, and James Howden, Dunglave, county Cavan, gentleman, in respect of part of the town and lands of Aghnacally (Aughnakelly) known by the name Legavreagra (Legauregra), parish of Kinawley, county Cavan. Lease to run from date of deed to 1 October next. Rent of 5 shillings. (D) Reference No. P017/0041, dated 7 March 1834 described as- Assignment made between James Howden, Dunglave, County Cavan, gentleman, and Charles Magee, Tully, County Cavan, gentleman. Recites that by lease made on 18 June 1824, Joshua Taylor, then of Kilnaglare, county Cavan, gentleman, and James Howden, party hereto, Taylor leased the town and lands of Aghnacally (Aughnakilly) then in the possession of Edward Whitely; and also the town and lands of Legavreagra (Legariegra), parish of Kinawley, county Cavan, for named lives and with covenant for perpetual renewal. Annual rent of £40 late currency of Ireland. Howden now assigns the lands to Magee in consideration of receipt of sum of £200 sterling. Noted on verso that a memorial of the deed was entered in the Register Office, city of Dublin, on 9 May 1834, in book 9, number 23. (E) Reference No. P017/0042, dated 7 May 1834 described as- Assignment made between Moses Netterfield, Ballyconnell, County Cavan, gentleman, and Charles Magee, Tully, County Cavan, gentleman. Recites that by lease made on 20 November 1824 made between Joshua Taylor, Kilnaglare, gentleman, and Edward Whitley, Ballyconnell, esquire, both in county Cavan, of the one part, and Moses Netterfield, party hereto, of the other part, Taylor and Whitley leased to Netterfield the town and lands of Aghnacally (Aughnakelly), parish of Kinawley, county Cavan, and sub-denomination of Legavreagra (Legauregra). To be held for the natural lives of Laurence Spear, Moses Netterfield and Richard Netterfield with covenant for perpetual rent. Annual rent of £45.10.0 late currency. Recites details of renewals of lease made after 1824. It has now been agreed that Netterfield, in consideration of sum of £276, is to assign the property to Magee. Noted that a memorial of the deed was entered at the Register Office, city of Dublin, on 9 May 1834, in book 9, number [21].

The Tithe Applotment Books 1834 spell the name as Lugavegre.

Griffith's Valuation of 1857 lists twenty-one landholders in the townland.

The landlord of Legavreagra in the 1850s was William Magee.

== Census ==
| Year | Population | Males | Females | Total Houses | Uninhabited |
|---|---|---|---|---|---|
| 1841 | 28 | 17 | 11 | 6 | 0 |
| 1851 | 34 | 19 | 15 | 7 | 0 |
| 1861 | 37 | 19 | 18 | 9 | 0 |
| 1871 | 39 | 20 | 19 | 8 | 0 |
| 1881 | 30 | 15 | 15 | 7 | 1 |
| 1891 | 20 | 11 | 9 | 6 | 0 |

In the 1901 census of Ireland, there were six families listed in the townland.

In the 1911 census of Ireland, there were seven families listed in the townland.

== Antiquities ==
1. Lime-kilns.
2. Stone bridges across the rivers.
