= Borim (Kinawley) =

Townland in County Cavan, Ireland

Coordinates: 54°10′N 7°42′W

Borim (Irish derived place name, Bó Dhroim, meaning "The Ridge of the Cow") is a townland in the civil parish of Kinawley, barony of Tullyhaw, County Cavan, Ireland. A sub-division is called The Knocken (Irish derived place name, Cnoc-ín, meaning 'The Small Hill'). The 1938 Dúchas collection states- it is a field in the farm of Mr Patrick McGovern. It is a high bank over a river with a lone bush growing in it.

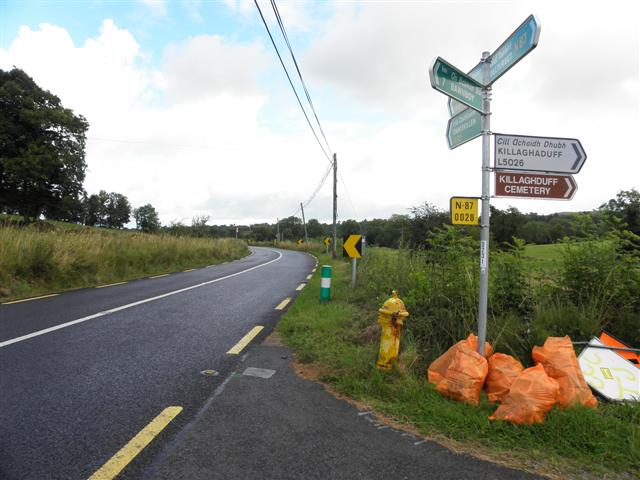
N87 near Borim (geograph 3597237)

== Etymology ==
The Dúchas folklore collection states it is so named because it resembles a cow's back, but Patrick Weston Joyce in Irish Names of Places, Vol. III states that: "Borim, in Cavan, exactly represents the sound of the Irish Bo-dhruim, cow-ridge, i.e. a low hill-ridge or back which, for its sweet grass, was a favourite grazing place for cows. Here the two component words are Bo and drim (Irish druim), and if there was no aspiration the compound Bo-drim would be sounded as it is written, with the 'd' brought out fully. But as the 'd' is aspirated under the adjectival influence of Bo, it drops out, and the name becomes reduced to Borim".

The name could be a reduction from the irish "Bothár ím", meaning "Butter road" to reflect its use for transporting butter.

== Geography ==
Borim is bounded on the north by Gorteen (Kinawley) townland, on the south by Drumcanon (Kinawley) and Gortlaunaght townlands, on the west by Derryrealt and Drumboory townlands and on the east by Gortnaleg and Tircahan townlands. Its chief geographical features are the Blackwater river which later flows into the River Cladagh (Swanlinbar), mountain streams and dug wells. Borim is traversed by the national secondary N87 road (Ireland), minor public roads and rural lanes. The townland covers 180 statute acres.

== History ==
In medieval times Borim was owned by the McGovern Clan and formed part of a ballybetagh spelled (variously) Aghycloony, Aghcloone, Nacloone, Naclone and Noclone (Irish derived place name Áth Chluain, meaning 'The Ford of the Meadow'). The 1609 Baronial Map depicts the ballybetagh as Naclone.

In the Plantation of Ulster by grant dated 26 June 1615, King James VI and I granted, inter alia, The precinct or parcel of Nacloone otherwise Aghcloone to Sir George Graeme and Sir Richard Graeme to form part of the Manor of Greame. A history of Richard and George Graham is viewable online. The Grahams took part in the Irish Rebellion of 1641 and after the war their lands were confiscated under the Act for the Settlement of Ireland 1652 and distributed as follows-

The 1652 Commonwealth Survey spells the name as Buorim and lists the proprietor as Mr Thomas Worshipp and the tenants as Tiernan McHugh & others.

The 1665 Down Survey map of Tullyhaw depicts the townland as Gortnaboram.

A grant dated 9 September 1669 from King Charles II to Arthur Annesley, 1st Earl of Anglesey included part of Gortnaboram alias Quillin with an area of 110 acres and 16 perches at an annual rent of £1-9s-8d.

William Petty's 1685 map depicts it as Gortnaboram.

In a deed dated 28 July 1720 Morley Saunders granted to Richard Hassard- the part of the lands of Borim now in the possession of the said Richard Hassard or his undertenants and late in the possession of Neile MaGowran.

A deed by Thomas Enery dated 29 Jan 1735 includes the lands of Borim.

In a deed dated 13 August 1738 John Enery conveyed to Richard Hassard, inter alia, the lands of Borein.

A deed dated 13 December 1774 by John Enery spells the townland as Borim otherwise Borem.

The 1790 Cavan Carvaghs List spells the name as-Buorin.

The 1821 Census of Ireland spells the name as Boreame.

The Tithe Applotment Books 1834 spell the name as Boaram.

The Borim Valuation Office Field books are available for 1838-1840.

Griffith's Valuation of 1857 lists nineteen landholders in the townland.

The landlord of Borim in the 19th century was the Hassard Estate.

A noted resident of the townland was Patrick McGovern (Irish politician).

== Census ==
| Year | Population | Males | Females | Total Houses | Uninhabited |
|---|---|---|---|---|---|
| 1841 | 80 | 41 | 29 | 13 | 0 |
| 1851 | 68 | 33 | 35 | 12 | 0 |
| 1861 | 44 | 23 | 21 | 11 | 3 |
| 1871 | 42 | 20 | 22 | 8 | 1 |
| 1881 | 43 | 21 | 22 | 5 | 0 |
| 1891 | 28 | 17 | 11 | 5 | 0 |

In the Census of Ireland 1821, there were twenty families living in the townland.

In the 1901 census of Ireland, there were nine families listed in the townland.

In the 1911 census of Ireland, there were six families listed in the townland.

== Antiquities ==
1. A stone quarry
2. Borim House
3. A cast-iron water hydrant erected c.1880.
