= Aghakinnigh =

Townland in County Cavan, Ireland

Coordinates: 54°10′0.494″N 7°39′57.074″W

Aghakinnigh (Irish derived place name, Achadh an Chinn Eich, meaning 'The Field of the Horse’s Head') is a townland in the civil parish of Kinawley, barony of Tullyhaw, County Cavan, Ireland. A sub-division is called Mullach Bán (Irish place name, meaning 'The White Summit'). The 1938 Dúchas folklore collection states- Mullac ban- A name given to a hill in Aughakinnagh, Swanlinbar. It is locally supposed there is a white sand stone quarry under it.

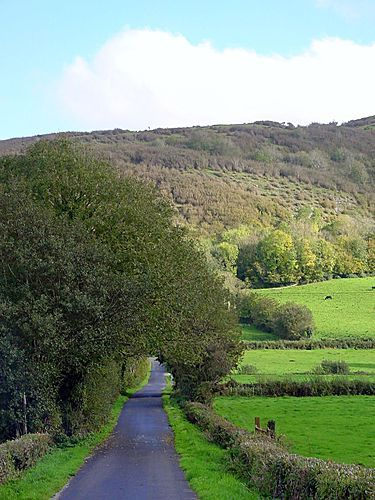
Aghakinnigh, Kinawley County Cavan, Ireland

== Geography ==
Aghakinnigh is bounded on the north by Drumersee townland, on the south by Cullion (Kinawley) townland, on the west by Drumbar (Kinawley) and Newtown (Kinawley) townlands and on the east by Aghnacally, Legavreagra and Mullanacre Upper townlands. It forms part of the Slieve Rushen Bog Natural Heritage Area. Its chief geographical features are Slieve Rushen mountain on whose north-western slope it lies, reaching a height of 1,280 feet; mountain streams; waterfalls; forestry plantations; spring wells and dug wells. Aghakinnigh is traversed by minor public roads and rural lanes. The townland covers 460 statute acres.

== History ==
In medieval times Aghakinnigh was owned by the McGovern Clan and formed part of a ballybetagh spelled (variously) Aghycloony, Aghcloone, Nacloone, Naclone and Noclone (Irish derived place name Áth Chluain, meaning the ‘Ford of the Meadow’). The 1609 Baronial Map depicts the ballybetagh as Naclone.

In the Plantation of Ulster by grant dated 26 June 1615, King James VI and I granted, inter alia, The precinct or parcel of Nacloone otherwise Aghcloone to Sir George Graeme and Sir Richard Graeme to form part of the Manor of Greame. A history of Richard and George Graham is viewable online. The Grahams took part in the Irish Rebellion of 1641 and after the war their lands were confiscated under the Act for the Settlement of Ireland 1652.

The 1652 Commonwealth Survey spells the name as Aghakiney and lists the proprietor as Mr Thomas Worshipp and the tenant as Edmund Magwire.

The 1790 Cavan Carvaghs list spells the name as Aghukmeigh.

The 1821 Census of Ireland spells the name as Aughakinih and Aughakinagh and Aughakenigh.

The Tithe Applotment Books 1834 spell the name as Aghakinigh Lower and Aghkinigh Upper.

Griffith's Valuation of 1857 lists nineteen landholders in the townland.

The landlord of Aghakinnigh in the 1850s was Singleton Crawford.

Folklore from Aghakinnigh can be found in the 1938 Dúchas collection.

== Census ==
Year	Population	Males	Females	Total Houses	Uninhabited
1841	148	75	73	24	1
1851	130	67	63	20	0
1861	95	49	46	17	0
1871	93	45	48	18	0
1881	111	58	53	18	0
1891	92	50	42	17	0

In the 1821 census of Ireland there were fourteen households listed in the townland.

In the 1901 census of Ireland, there were eighteen families listed in the townland.

In the 1911 census of Ireland, there were eighteen families listed in the townland.

== Antiquities ==
1. Lime-kilns.
2. A foot-bridge across the river.
3. Stone bridges across the rivers.
4. Aghakinnigh 19th century Hedge-School. The 1938 Dúchas Collection states- There was another hedge school in Aughakinnigh just on the Crocán below Pee Peters (Pee McGuire). A man named McGuire taught here and then a man named McHugh. Both are dead and gone and all belonging to them too. They went to America.
