= Gortlaunaght =

Townland in County Cavan, Ireland

Coordinates: 54.1700°N 7.7052°W

Gortlaunaght (Irish derived place name Gort Leamhnachta, meaning the ‘Field of the Fresh Milk’) is a townland in the civil parish of Kinawley, barony of Tullyhaw, County Cavan, Ireland.

== Geography ==
Gortlaunaght is split into two distinct geographical parts, which probably indicates it was a larger townland before the 1836 Ordnance Survey. The north-eastern part is bounded on the north by Tonyquin townland, on the south by Tircahan townland, on the west by Killaghaduff townland and on the east by Drumbar (Kinawley) townland. The south-western part is bounded on the north by Borim (Kinawley) townland, on the south by Drumcanon (Kinawley) and Dunglave townlands and on the east by Gortnaleg townland. Its chief geographical features are a hill that reaches a height of 480 feet, the Blackwater river which later flows into the River Cladagh (Swanlinbar), mountain streams, woods, water sinkholes, a pool and a quarry. Gortlaunaght is traversed by minor public roads and rural lanes. The townland covers 107 statute acres.

== History ==
Gortlaunaght has been occupied continuously from about 2,800 B.C. to the present day, as is evident from recent archaeological excavations.

In medieval times Gortlaunaght was owned by the McGovern Clan and formed part of a ballybetagh spelled (variously) Aghycloony, Aghcloone, Nacloone, Naclone and Noclone (Irish derived place name Áth Chluain, meaning the ‘Ford of the Meadow’). The 1609 Baronial Map depicts the ballybetagh as Naclone.

In the Plantation of Ulster by grant dated 29 April 1611, along with other lands, King James VI and I granted the part poll of Gortlaronagh to Mulmore McTirlagh O'Reily, Gentleman. The said Maelmordha O'Reilly was related to chiefs of the O'Reilly clan, which is why he received a grant of land. His great-grandfather was Maolmhordha O'Reilly who was chief from 1537–1565. He was a grand-nephew of both Aodh Connallach O'Reilly who was chief from 1565–1583 and of Emonn O'Reilly who was chief from 1596-1601. He was a first cousin once-removed of Sean O'Reilly who was chief from 1583–1596. He was also a first cousin once-removed of Donill Backagh McShane O'Reyly who was also granted lands in Burren (townland) and of Cahell M'Owen O Reyly who received lands in Gowlagh South townland and of Cahir McOwen O'Reily, who received lands in Kildoagh townland.

In the Plantation of Ulster by grant dated 26 June 1615, King James VI and I granted, inter alia, The precinct or parcel of Nacloone otherwise Aghcloone to Sir George Graeme and Sir Richard Graeme to form part of the Manor of Greame, but the townland of Gortlawnat already granted to the aforementioned Mulmore McTirlagh O'Reily was specifically excluded from this grant.

An Inquisition held at Belturbet on 12 June 1661 stated that, on his death on 30 April 1643, Henry Croften of Mohill, County Leitrim, was in possession of, inter alia, one poll in Gortnelannagh and his son Henry Croften junior (born 1630) then took possession.

The 1652 Commonwealth Survey spells the townland as Gortlawnaght with the proprietor being Mr Henry Crafton and the tenants being Donogh Magwire & others. The townland formed part of the Crofton estate until the late 19th century. The Crofton Estate papers are in the National Library of Ireland, MS 20,773-20,806 & D 26,886-27,010 and in the Public Records Office of Northern Ireland at reference Number D-3480add, which is an estate map of Gortlaunaght.

In the Templeport Poll Book of 1761 there was only one person registered to vote in Gortlaunaght in the Irish general election, 1761 - Robert Johnston of Killywillin, who was entitled to two votes. He voted for Charles Coote, 1st Earl of Bellomont who won the election and for George Montgomery (MP) of Ballyconnell, who lost the election. Absence from the poll book either meant a resident did not vote or more likely was not a freeholder entitled to vote, which would mean most of the inhabitants of Gortlaunaght.

The 1790 Cavan Carvagh list spells the name as Gortlaunaght.

The 1821 Census of Ireland spells the name as Gorthlannagh.

The 1825 Tithe Applotment Books spell the name as Gortlownaght.

The Gortlaunaght Valuation Office Field books are available for August 1838.

Griffith's Valuation lists two landholders in the townland.

== Census ==
Year	Population	Males	Females	Total Houses	Uninhabited
1841	12	3	9	3	0
1851	12	5	7	3	0
1861	12	5	7	3	0
1871	14	4	10	2	0
1881	15	5	10	3	0
1891	9	5	4	2	0

In the Census of Ireland 1821 there were three households in the townland.

In the 1901 census of Ireland, there was one family listed in the townland.

In the 1911 census of Ireland, there was one family listed in the townland.

== Antiquities ==
1. Neolithic shelter. Located on a shelf on a W-facing slope overlooking the S-N Blackwater River which is c. 800m distant. Archaeological monitoring (09E0439) by The Archaeological Company over an extensive area (44.5 ha) in Tonyquin and Gortlaunaght townlands in advance of a quarry development identified numerous archaeological monuments including a Neolithic house, an oval enclosure and a ringfort. Further monitoring identified and excavated over 200 features, and intensive cleaning in particular areas identified 300 more, including two concentrations which proved to be a hut-site (CV017—019001-) and this structure, which is probably a shelter. These were excavated fully by Aidan O’Connell for Archer Heritage Planning under an extension of the same licence. This structure in Area 5 consists of an arc of stake-holes (Chord c. 10m NE-SW) curving out to the NW, with a smaller line of 6 stake-holes c. 3m to the NW. Four stake-holes placed c. 2m apart are at the E edge of the arc, and there are two large pits (dims 2m x 1.4m; D 0.8m) within the arc. (O’Connell and O’Hara 2010, 6)
2. Bronze Age house. Located on a shelf on a W-facing slope overlooking the S-N Blackwater River which is c. 800m distant. Archaeological monitoring (09E0439) by The Archaeological Company over an extensive area (44.5 ha) in Tonyquin and Gortlaunaght townlands in advance of a quarry development identified numerous archaeological monuments including a Neolithic house, an oval enclosure and a ringfort. Further monitoring identified and excavated over 200 features, and intensive cleaning in particular areas identified 300 more, including two concentrations which proved to be this hut-site and what is probably a shelter (CV007-019002-) c. 40m to the S. These were excavated fully by Aidan O’Connell for Archer Heritage Planning under an extension of the same licence. The house is a circular feature in Area 5 identified by two rings of post-holes. The inner ring of 9 post-holes were larger and load-bearing to support the roof while the outer ring (diam. c. 9m) of 18 slighter post-holes provided the wall. It had a doorway (Wth 1m) at ESE where the two lines converged, with a light screen outside it represented by a line of stake-holes, and there was a central hearth. Outside the house a NW-SE line of pits just to the NE created a congested group at its S end c. 6m to the SE, and a similar NW-SE line of eight pits curved around the SW side of the house. Therse was an arc of 13 stake-holes (L 8.5m) c. 6m S of the house. Pottery sherds of Cordoned Urns from the pits suggest an Early-Middle Bronze Age date (Grogan and Roche 2010), and a C14 date of 1680–1510 bc (SUERC–3945-3310 ± 30 bp) was recovered from a post-hole in the house. (O’Connell and O’Hara 2010, 6-9)
