= Gortnaderrylea =

Townland in County Cavan, Ireland

Coordinates: 54.1787°N 7.6905°W

Gortnaderrylea (Irish derived place name, either Gort an Doire Léith, meaning The Field of the Grey Oakwood or Gort an Doire Ard, meaning The Field of the High Oakwood or Gort na Dairbhre, meaning The Field of the Oak Tree) is a townland in the civil parish of Kinawley, barony of Tullyhaw, County Cavan, Ireland.

== Geography ==
Gortnaderrylea is bounded on the south by Tonyquin townland, on the west by Drumod Glebe and Killaghaduff townlands and on the east by Drumbar (Kinawley) townland. Its chief geographical features are a rivulet, a quarry, a dug well and a spring well. Gortnaderrylea is traversed by minor public roads and rural lanes. The townland covers 45 statute acres.

== History ==
In medieval times Gortnaderrylea was owned by the McGovern Clan and formed part of a ballybetagh spelled (variously) Aghycloony, Aghcloone, Nacloone, Naclone and Noclone (Irish derived place name Áth Chluain, meaning The Ford of the Meadow). The 1609 Baronial Map depicts the ballybetagh as Naclone.

In the Plantation of Ulster by grant dated 29 April 1611, along with other lands, King James VI and I granted one poll of Gortnedirrey to Mulmore McTirlagh O'Reily, Gentleman. The said Maelmordha O'Reilly was related to chiefs of the O'Reilly clan, which is why he received a grant of land. His great-grandfather was Maolmhordha O'Reilly who was chief from 1537–1565. He was a grand-nephew of both Aodh Connallach O'Reilly who was chief from 1565–1583 and of Emonn O'Reilly who was chief from 1596–1601. He was a first cousin once-removed of Sean O'Reilly who was chief from 1583–1596. He was also a first cousin once-removed of Donill Backagh McShane O'Reyly who was also granted lands in Burren (townland) and of Cahell M'Owen O Reyly who received lands in Gowlagh South townland and of Cahir McOwen O'Reily, who received lands in Kildoagh townland.

In the Plantation of Ulster by grant dated 26 June 1615, King James VI and I granted, inter alia, The precinct or parcel of Nacloone otherwise Aghcloone to Sir George Graeme and Sir Richard Graeme to form part of the Manor of Greame, but the townland of one poll in Gortnedary already granted to the aforementioned Mulmore McTirlagh O'Reily was specifically excluded from this grant.

An Inquisition held at Belturbet on 12 June 1661 stated that, on his death on 30 April 1643, Henry Croften of Mohill, County Leitrim, was in possession of, inter alia, one poll in Gortanedirry and his son Henry Croften junior (born 1630) then took possession. The 1652 Commonwealth Survey spells the townland as Gortnedarredde with the proprietor being aforesaid Mr Henry Crafton and the tenants being Donogh Magwire & others. The townland formed part of the Crofton estate until the 19th century. The Crofton Estate papers are in the National Library of Ireland, MS 20,773-20,806 & D 26,886-27,010 and in the Public Records Office of Northern Ireland at reference Number D-3480add.

The 1790 Cavan Carvagh list spells the name as Gortnardarry.

The 1821 Census of Ireland spells the name as Gartnaderra.

The 1825 Tithe Applotment Books spell the name as Gortnaderra.

The 1836 Ordnance survey Namebooks state- Lime can be procured in any part of the land, used for manure and building. The soil is rocky and the crops are in general poor.

The Gortnaderrylea Valuation Office Field books are available for August 1838.

Griffith's Valuation lists two landholders in the townland.

== Census ==
Year	Population	Males	Females	Total Houses	Uninhabited
1841	16	8	8	3	0
1851	7	3	4	2	0
1861	8	4	4	2	0
1871	6	3	3	2	0
1881	2	1	1	1	0
1891	2	2	0	1	0

In the Census of Ireland 1821 there was one household in the townland.

In the 1901 census of Ireland, there was one family listed in the townland.

In the 1911 census of Ireland, there was one family listed in the townland.
