= Aghnacally =

Townland in County Cavan, Ireland

Coordinates: 54.1698°N 7.6420°W

Aghnacally (Irish derived place name, either Achadh na Caillí, meaning 'The Field of the Hag’ or Ucht na Caillí, meaning 'The Hill of the Hag’ or Ucht na Choillidh, meaning 'The Hill of the Wood’) is a townland in the civil parish of Kinawley, barony of Tullyhaw, County Cavan, Ireland. A sub-division is called Carricknabrock (Irish derived place name, Carraig na Broic, meaning 'The Rock of the Badgers’). Another sub-division is called The Spinks. The 1938 Dúchas folklore collection states- The 'Spinks', in the townland of Aughnakelly in a hollow between Northern and Southern Ireland, is supposed to contain deposits of coal.

== Geography ==
Aghnacally is bounded on the north by Gorgesh townland in County Fermanagh, on the south by Carrowmore, County Cavan and Legavreagra townlands, on the west by Aghakinnigh and Drumersee townlands and on the east by Aghyoule, County Fermanagh and Tonymore townlands. It forms part of the Slieve Rushen Bog Natural Heritage Area. Its chief geographical features are Slieve Rushen mountain on whose north-western slope it lies, reaching a height of 1,294 feet; the Meenymore Formation, major sections of which are exposed in the stream gully between Gorgesh and Aghnacally; mountain pools; the Owengarr River; mountain streams; a waterfall; forestry plantations; spring wells and dug wells. Aghnacally is traversed by minor public roads and rural lanes. The townland covers 760 statute acres.

== History ==
In medieval times Aghnacally was owned by the McGovern Clan and formed part of a ballybetagh spelled (variously) Aghycloony, Aghcloone, Nacloone, Naclone and Noclone (Irish derived place name Áth Chluain, meaning ‘The Ford of the Meadow’). The 1609 Baronial Map depicts the ballybetagh as Naclone.

In the Plantation of Ulster by grant dated 26 June 1615, King James VI and I granted, inter alia, The precinct or parcel of Nacloone otherwise Aghcloone to Sir George Graeme and Sir Richard Graeme to form part of the Manor of Greame. An Inquisition held at Cavan Town on 31 October 1627 found that Sir Richard Greames of Corrasmongan died on 7 November 1625 seized of, inter alia, one poll of Outnakelly. His son and heir Thomas Greames was aged 40 (born 1585) and married. A history of Richard and George Graham is viewable online. The Grahams took part in the Irish Rebellion of 1641 and after the war their lands were confiscated under the Act for the Settlement of Ireland 1652.

The 1652 Commonwealth Survey spells the name as Ughtnekelly and lists the proprietor as Mr Thomas Worshipp and the tenant as Edmund Magwire.

The 1790 Cavan Carvaghs list spells the name as Ughtnacally.

Sir Charles Coote in his 1802 Statistical Survey of County Cavan, page 28, states- in the mountain of Ortnacullagh near Ballyconnell, both lead and silver ore are carried down the stream, which flows from thence.

The 1821 Census of Ireland spells the name as Aughnakelly and states- Said lands containing 100 acres of green pasture & 200 of moory black mountain.

Cavan Library holds several leases relating to Aghnacally. (A) Reference No. P017/0034, dated 7 October 1827 described as- Renewal of lease made between Joshua Taylor, Killniglare, gentleman, and Edward Whitely, Ballyconnell, esquire, both County Cavan, of the one part, and Moses Netterfield, Ballyconnell, County Cavan, gentleman. Recites that by indenture of lease dated 20 November 1824 made between same parties, Taylor and Whitely leased to Netterfield the lands of Aughnakilly, parish of Kinawly, County Cavan; sub-denomination of Aghnacally (Aughnakilly) called Legavreagra (Legauregra), for three named lives with covenant for perpetual renewal. Rent of £45.10.0 late currency. One of the lives named has died and renewal now granted with insertion of life of James Spear, son of John Spear, Tullybrien, County Tyrone, gentleman, aged 16 years. Annual rent of £42 sterling present currency being equal to £45.10.0 late currency. (B) Reference No. P017/0039, dated 24 December 1833 described as- Assignment made between Edward Whitely, Ballyconnell, County Cavan, gentleman, and Charles Magee, Tully, County Cavan, gentleman. Recites that by lease dated 25 September 1742 made between Owen Wynne, esquire, of one part, and James Herdman and George Spear, of the other part, in respect of the lands of Drumersee and Aghnacally (Aughnakelly) and the mears and bounds by which it was leased by William Armstrong, in the barony of Tullyhaw, County Cavan. Lease to run for named lives renewable forever at annual rent of £31 then currency of Ireland. Recites details of other deeds affecting the property. Now, in consideration of £800 sterling paid to Whitely by Magee, land is assigned. (C) Reference No. P017/0040, dated 7 March 1834 described as- Lease made between Charles Magee, Tully, county Cavan, gentleman, and James Howden, Dunglave, county Cavan, gentleman, in respect of part of the town and lands of Aghnacally (Aughnakelly) known by the name Legavreagra (Legauregra), parish of Kinawley, county Cavan. Lease to run from date of deed to 1 October next. Rent of 5 shillings. (D) Reference No. P017/0041, dated 7 March 1834 described as- Assignment made between James Howden, Dunglave, County Cavan, gentleman, and Charles Magee, Tully, County Cavan, gentleman. Recites that by lease made on 18 June 1824, Joshua Taylor, then of Kilnaglare, county Cavan, gentleman, and James Howden, party hereto, Taylor leased the town and lands of Aghnacally (Aughnakilly) then in the possession of Edward Whitely; and also the town and lands of Legavreagra (Legariegra), parish of Kinawley, county Cavan, for named lives and with covenant for perpetual renewal. Annual rent of £40 late currency of Ireland. Howden now assigns the lands to Magee in consideration of receipt of sum of £200 sterling. Noted on verso that a memorial of the deed was entered in the Register Office, city of Dublin, on 9 May 1834, in book 9, number 23. (E) Reference No. P017/0042, dated 7 May 1834 described as- Assignment made between Moses Netterfield, Ballyconnell, County Cavan, gentleman, and Charles Magee, Tully, County Cavan, gentleman. Recites that by lease made on 20 November 1824 made between Joshua Taylor, Kilnaglare, gentleman, and Edward Whitley, Ballyconnell, esquire, both in county Cavan, of the one part, and Moses Netterfield, party hereto, of the other part, Taylor and Whitley leased to Netterfield the town and lands of Aghnacally (Aughnakelly), parish of Kinawley, county Cavan, and sub-denomination of Legavreagra (Legauregra). To be held for the natural lives of Laurence Spear, Moses Netterfield and Richard Netterfield with covenant for perpetual rent. Annual rent of £45.10.0 late currency. Recites details of renewals of lease made after 1824. It has now been agreed that Netterfield, in consideration of sum of £276, is to assign the property to Magee. Noted that a memorial of the deed was entered at the Register Office, city of Dublin, on 9 May 1834, in book 9, number [21].

The Tithe Applotment Books 1834 spell the name as Aughnacully.

The 1836 Ordnance Survey Namebooks state- There is a hill in the east part of the townland called the Black Cairn and a ridge of rocks called Carrick-na-brock.

Griffith's Valuation of 1857 lists twenty-two landholders in the townland.

The landlord of Aghnacally in the 1850s was William Magee.

Aghnacally folklore is found in the 1938 Dúchas collection.

== Census ==
| Year | Population | Males | Females | Total Houses | Uninhabited |
|---|---|---|---|---|---|
| 1841 | 94 | 53 | 41 | 17 | 2 |
| 1851 | 89 | 56 | 33 | 15 | 0 |
| 1861 | 97 | 59 | 38 | 16 | 0 |
| 1871 | 84 | 44 | 40 | 17 | 0 |
| 1881 | 88 | 42 | 46 | 17 | 0 |
| 1891 | 73 | 38 | 35 | 17 | 1 |

In the 1821 census of Ireland there were six families listed in the townland.

In the 1901 census of Ireland, there were sixteen families listed in the townland.

In the 1911 census of Ireland, there were fifteen families listed in the townland.

== Antiquities ==
1. A megalithic wedge tomb Gallery grave, erected c.2,250 BC. The 'Archaeological Inventory of County Cavan' (Site No. 6) (Dublin: Stationery Office, 1995) states- "Situated in an open space in a plantation on the NW flank of Slieve Rushen. The gallery, 4m long, is slightly higher and wider at its open SW end. Two orthostats form the N side and three the S side. The backstone is set beyond the ends of the gallery sides. A massive slab, split in two, covers all but the SW end of the gallery. A tree rooted in peat on top of the roofstone may have caused the break. There are four outer wall stones to the N of the gallery and two lines of outer-walling, the inner of four stones and the outer of three, at the S. The structure is incorporated in a mound measuring 9m E-W and 7.5m N-S." Local folklore about the cromlech is found in the 1938 Dúchas Collection.
2. A stone cairn. The 'Archaeological Inventory of County Cavan' (Site No. 119) (Dublin: Stationery Office, 1995) states- Marked on the OS 1836 and 1876 eds. as the 'Black Cam'. It is depicted as an oval enclosure (dims. c. 80m NW-SE; c. 55m ENE-WSW) on the 1836 ed. Situated within a dense modern plantation of coniferous trees. Not located.
3. Lime-kilns.
4. Stepping-stones across the river.
5. A foot-stick across the river.
6. Stone bridges across the rivers.
