= Tonyquin =

Townland in County Cavan, Ireland

Tonyquin (Irish derived place name, either Tonnaí Choinn, meaning 'The Marsh of Conn' or Tamnach Choinn, meaning 'The Pasture of Conn' or Tonnaí Uí Choinn, meaning 'The Marsh of O'Quinn' or Tamnach Uí Choinn, meaning 'The Pasture of O'Quinn') is a townland in the civil parish of Kinawley, barony of Tullyhaw, County Cavan, Ireland.

== Geography ==
Tonyquin is bounded on the north by Gortnaderrylea townland, on the south by Gortlaunaght townland, on the west by Killaghaduff townland and on the east by Drumbar (Kinawley) townland. Its chief geographical features are Tonyquin Hill which reaches a height of 482 feet, a wood, a rivulet, a quarry and a dug well. Tonyquin is traversed by minor public roads and rural lanes. The townland covers 29 statute acres.

== History ==
Tonyquin has been occupied continuously from about 2,800 B.C. to the present day, as is evident from recent archaeological excavations.

In medieval times Tonyquin was owned by the McGovern Clan and formed part of a ballybetagh spelled (variously) Aghycloony, Aghcloone, Nacloone, Naclone and Noclone (Irish derived place name Áth Chluain, meaning the 'Ford of the Meadow'). The 1609 Baronial Map depicts the ballybetagh as Naclone.

In the Plantation of Ulster by grant dated 26 June 1615, King James VI and I granted, inter alia, The precinct or parcel of Nacloone otherwise Aghcloone to Sir George Graeme and Sir Richard Graeme to form part of the Manor of Greame. A history of Richard and George Graham is viewable online. The Grahams took part in the Irish Rebellion of 1641 and after the war their lands were confiscated under the Act for the Settlement of Ireland 1652.

The 1652 Commonwealth Survey spells the name as Townyquin and gives the owner as Mr Thomas Worshipp and the tenants as William Graham & others, so the Grahams had been reduced to tenant status.

A deed by Thomas Enery dated 29 Jan 1735 includes the lands of Tawnequin.

A deed dated 10 December 1774 by John Enery spells the townland as Tawneyquin.

A deed dated 13 December 1774 by John Enery spells the townland as Tawneyquin otherwise Tawnyquin otherwise Taynequin.

The 1790 Cavan Carvaghs list, spells the name as Tawneenquin.

The 1821 Census of Ireland spells the name as Townyquin and states- Fertile fattening land.

The Tithe Applotment Books 1834 spell the name as Tonyquin.

The Tonyquin Valuation Office Field books are available for August 1838.

On 23 March 1850, The Incumbered Estates Commission sold part of the Hassard estate, including Tonyquin, on 29 April 1853 as follows-Sale of Incumbered Estates in Ireland, Notice to Claimants and Incumbrancers. In the Matter of the Estate of Francis Hassard, of Rockwood, in the County of Cavan, Owner, ex-parte William Thompson, Petitioner, Whereas, by an absolute Order, bearing date of the 23rd day of November, 1849, it was ordered, that the Lands of Rockwood, otherwise Tiercahan, situate in the Barony of Tullaha and County of Cavan; Gortnaleg, Upper and Lower, situate in same barony and county; Newtown, formerly part of Tiercahan, above-mentioned; Dunglave; Tonyquin; Gortmore; Gub, also called Gub Wallace; Maugherea, otherwise Moherre, otherwise Moherra; Finahoo; Cullion, otherwise Tawneanagra; All situate in the Barony of Tullaha and County of Cavan, should be sold for the purpose of discharging the incumbrances thereon. Now, all Persons claiming Estates or Interests on the said Premises, who may object to such Order are hereby informed that the Commissioners will hear any applications which any other person may desire to bring before them, on Notice, to be served at the Office, 14 Henrietta-Street, Dublin, within One Calendar Month from the date hereof. And all Persons claiming Charges or Incumbrances on the said Premises, or any part thereof, are required to lodge a brief statement of the Particulars thereof at the said Office, within two Calendar Months from the date hereof, and also to send their respective Addresses, in order that they may receive notice at what time and in what manner their claims should be established. Dated this 23rd day of March, 1850. S.Woulfe Flanagan, Secretary John Collum, Solicitor for the Petitioner, having the Carriage of the Sale--Offices, 70, Talbot-street. Dublin and Enniskillen.

The Incumbered Estates Commission sold part of the Hassard estate, including Tonyquin, on 29 April 1853 as follows- Final notice to Claimants. Incumbered Estates Commission. In the Matter of the estate of Francis Hassard, Esquire, Owner, Ex-parte Adam Thompson, Executor of William Thompson, Petitioner. Take Notice, that the Commissioners have Sold the Lands of Rockwood, otherwise Tiercahan (Lower), Tircahan (Upper), Gertaleg (Upper), Dunglave (part of), Tonyquin, Newtown, Gortmore, Cullion, otherwise Tawneanagra, Gub or Gub Wallace, Finagho, or Finahoo, and Magherea otherwise Mohers, situate in the Barony of Tullyhaw, and County of Cavan, And the Draft Schedule of Incumbrances being lodged in the Office of the General Clerk, if any person have a claim not therein inserted, or any objection to said Schedule, particularly in respect of the Deeds mentioned in the Schedule hereto, or any lien on the purchase money, a statement, duly verified, of the particulars of such claim, objection, or lien, must be lodged by such person in said Office, on or before the Fourteenth day of June next, and on the following Monday at the Hour of eleven o'Clock A.M., Mountifort Lougfield, L.L.D., one of the Commissioners, will give directions for the final settlement of said Schedule. And you are to take notice, that, within the time aforesaid, any person may file an objection to any demand reported to you in the Draft Schedule. Schedule referred to by the foregoing notice: -- Deed dated 2nd June, 1759, being a Mortgage For £1500 by John Enery to William Crookshank. Deed dated 7th May, 1760, being an annuity granted to one Francis Enery, until the consideration money, £2000, paid off. Deed dated 1st October, 1763, whereby a term of years was created to raise £3,000, which was subsequently appointed to one Catherine Enery. Deed dated 21st December, 1771, being a Mortgage for £1,975 16s., by John Enery to George Tandy. Dated 29th day of April, 1853 Henry Carey, Secretary. {seal} John Collum, Solicitor, having carriage of the proceedings, 70, Talbot-street, Dublin.

Griffith's Valuation of 1857 lists one landholder (the O'Reilly family) in the townland.

In 1878 the O'Reilly lands in Tonyquin were sold to Mr J. McGovern.

== Census ==
Year	Population	Males	Females	Total Houses	Uninhabited
1841	4	2	2	1	0
1851	4	2	2	1	0
1861	4	2	2	1	0
1871	3	1	2	1	0
1881	0	0	0	0	0
1891	0	0	0	0	0

In the 1821 Census of Ireland there was one household listed in the townland.

In the 1901 census of Ireland, there was one family listed in the townland.

In the 1911 census of Ireland, there was one family listed in the townland.

== Antiquities ==
1. Neolithic shelter. Located on a shelf on a W-facing slope overlooking the S-N Blackwater River which is c. 800m distant. Archaeological monitoring (09E0439) by The Archaeological Company over an extensive area (44.5 ha) in Tonyquin and Gortlaunaght townlands in advance of a quarry development identified numerous archaeological monuments including a Neolithic house, an oval enclosure and a ringfort (https://www.excavations.ie/report/2010/Cavan/0021290/). Further monitoring identified and excavated over 200 features, and intensive cleaning in particular areas identified 300 more, including two concentrations which proved to be a hut-site (CV017—019001-) and this structure, which is probably a shelter. These were excavated fully by Aidan O'Connell for Archer Heritage Planning under an extension of the same licence. This structure in Area 5 consists of an arc of stake-holes (Chord c. 10m NE-SW) curving out to the NW, with a smaller line of 6 stake-holes c. 3m to the NW. Four stake-holes placed c. 2m apart are at the E edge of the arc, and there are two large pits (dims 2m x 1.4m; D 0.8m) within the arc. (O'Connell and O'Hara 2010, 6)
2. Bronze Age house. Located on a shelf on a W-facing slope overlooking the S-N Blackwater River which is c. 800m distant. Archaeological monitoring (09E0439) by The Archaeological Company over an extensive area (44.5 ha) in Tonyquin and Gortlaunaght townlands in advance of a quarry development identified numerous archaeological monuments including a Neolithic house, an oval enclosure and a ringfort (wwwexcavations.ie/report/2010/Cavan/0021290/). Further monitoring identified and excavated over 200 features, and intensive cleaning in particular areas identified 300 more, including two concentrations which proved to be this hut-site and what is probably a shelter (CV007-019002-) c. 40m to the S. These were excavated fully by Aidan O'Connell for Archer Heritage Planning under an extension of the same licence. The house is a circular feature in Area 5 identified by two rings of post-holes. The inner ring of 9 post-holes were larger and load-bearing to support the roof while the outer ring (diam. c. 9m) of 18 slighter post-holes provided the wall. It had a doorway (Wth 1m) at ESE where the two lines converged, with a light screen outside it represented by a line of stake-holes, and there was a central hearth. Outside the house a NW-SE line of pits just to the NE created a congested group at its S end c. 6m to the SE, and a similar NW-SE line of eight pits curved around the SW side of the house. Therse was an arc of 13 stake-holes (L 8.5m) c. 6m S of the house. Pottery sherds of Cordoned Urns from the pits suggest an Early-Middle Bronze Age date (Grogan and Roche 2010), and a C14 date of 1680–1510 bc (SUERC–3945-3310 ± 30 bp) (www.excavations.ie/report/2010/Cavan/0021291/) was recovered from a post-hole in the house. (O'Connell and O'Hara 2010, 6-9)
