= Cullion (Kinawley) =

Townland in County Cavan, Ireland

Cullion (Irish derived place name Cuileann, meaning 'The Holly Trees', and still locally known as 'The Hollies') is a townland in the civil parish of Kinawley, barony of Tullyhaw, County Cavan, Ireland. A sub-division of the townland is spelled variously as- Tawneanagra, Tawneynagrave and Tawneynegrawe. (Irish derived place name, Tamnach na gCraobh, meaning 'The Pasture of the Branches or Bushes').

== Geography ==
Cullion is bounded on the north by Drumbar (Kinawley) townland, on the west by Gortnaleg, Gub (Kinawley) and Newtown (Kinawley) townlands and on the east by Aghakinnigh, Finaghoo and Mullanacre Upper townlands. It forms part of the Slieve Rushen Bog Natural Heritage Area. Its chief geographical features are Slieve Rushen mountain on whose western slope it lies, reaching a height of 1,240 feet; mountain streams; waterfalls; forestry plantations and dug wells. Cullion is traversed by minor public roads and rural lanes. The townland covers 372 statute acres.

== History ==
In medieval times Cullion was owned by the McGovern Clan and formed part of a ballybetagh spelled (variously) Aghycloony, Aghcloone, Nacloone, Naclone and Noclone (Irish derived place name Áth Chluain, meaning the 'Ford of the Meadow'). The 1609 Baronial Map depicts the ballybetagh as Naclone.

In the Plantation of Ulster by grant dated 26 June 1615, King James VI and I granted, inter alia, The precinct or parcel of Nacloone otherwise Aghcloone to Sir George Graeme and Sir Richard Graeme to form part of the Manor of Greame. A history of Richard and George Graham is viewable online. The Grahams took part in the Irish Rebellion of 1641 and after the war their lands were confiscated under the Act for the Settlement of Ireland 1652.

In a deed dated 2 August 1714 Morley Saunders granted to Richard Hassard, inter alia, - the lands of Culleen and Tawneynagrave.

A deed by Thomas Enery dated 29 Jan 1735 includes the lands of Culleen & Tawnynegrave.

In a deed dated 13 August 1738 John Enery conveyed to Richard Hassard, inter alia, the lands of Culleen and Tawneynagrave.

A deed dated 13 December 1774 by John Enery spells the townland as Culleene otherwise Cullen otherwise Cullan and Tawneynegrawe.

In the Cavan Poll Book of 1761, there was one person registered to vote in Cullion in the Irish general election, 1761 - George Adams of Cullion. He was entitled to cast two votes. The four election candidates were Charles Coote, 1st Earl of Bellomont and Lord Newtownbutler (later Brinsley Butler, 2nd Earl of Lanesborough), both of whom were then elected Member of Parliament for Cavan County. The losing candidates were George Montgomery (MP) of Ballyconnell and Barry Maxwell, 1st Earl of Farnham. Absence from the poll book either meant a resident did not vote or more likely was not a freeholder entitled to vote, which would mean most of the inhabitants of Cullion.

The Tithe Applotment Books 1834 spell the name as Culleen.

On 23 March 1850 The Incumbered Estates Commission sold part of the Hassard estate, including Cullion, on 29 April 1853 as follows-Sale of Incumbered Estates in Ireland, Notice to Claimants and Incumbrancers. In the Matter of the Estate of Francis Hassard, of Rockwood, in the County of Cavan, Owner, ex-parte William Thompson, Petitioner, Whereas, by an absolute Order, bearing date of the 23rd day of November, 1849, it was ordered, that the Lands of Rockwood, otherwise Tiercahan, situate in the Barony of Tullaha and County of Cavan; Gortnaleg, Upper and Lower, situate in same barony and county; Newtown, formerly part of Tiercahan, above-mentioned; Dunglave; Tonyquin; Gortmore; Gub, also called Gub Wallace; Maugherea, otherwise Moherre, otherwise Moherra; Finahoo; Cullion, otherwise Tawneanagra; All situate in the Barony of Tullaha and County of Cavan, should be sold for the purpose of discharging the incumbrances thereon. Now, all Persons claiming Estates or Interests on the said Premises, who may object to such Order are hereby informed that the Commissioners will hear any applications which any other person may desire to bring before them, on Notice, to be served at the Office, 14 Henrietta-Street, Dublin, within One Calendar Month from the date hereof. And all Persons claiming Charges or Incumbrances on the said Premises, or any part thereof, are required to lodge a brief statement of the Particulars thereof at the said Office, within two Calendar Months from the date hereof, and also to send their respective Addresses, in order that they may receive notice at what time and in what manner their claims should be established. Dated this 23rd day of March, 1850. S.Woulfe Flanagan, Secretary John Collum, Solicitor for the Petitioner, having the Carriage of the Sale--Offices, 70, Talbot-street. Dublin and Enniskillen.

The Incumbered Estates Commission sold part of the Hassard estate, including Cullion, on 29 April 1853 as follows- Final notice to Claimants. Incumbered Estates Commission. In the Matter of the estate of Francis Hassard, Esquire, Owner, Ex-parte Adam Thompson, Executor of William Thompson, Petitioner. Take Notice, that the Commissioners have Sold the Lands of Rockwood, otherwise Tiercahan (Lower), Tircahan (Upper), Gertaleg (Upper), Dunglave (part of), Tonyquin, Newtown, Gortmore, Cullion, otherwise Tawneanagra, Gub or Gub Wallace, Finagho, or Finahoo, and Magherea otherwise Mohers, situate in the Barony of Tullyhaw, and County of Cavan, And the Draft Schedule of Incumbrances being lodged in the Office of the General Clerk, if any person have a claim not therein inserted, or any objection to said Schedule, particularly in respect of the Deeds mentioned in the Schedule hereto, or any lien on the purchase money, a statement, duly verified, of the particulars of such claim, objection, or lien, must be lodged by such person in said Office, on or before the Fourteenth day of June next, and on the following Monday at the Hour of eleven o'Clock A.M., Mountifort Lougfield, L.L.D., one of the Commissioners, will give directions for the final settlement of said Schedule. And you are to take notice, that, within the time aforesaid, any person may file an objection to any demand reported to you in the Draft Schedule. Schedule referred to by the foregoing notice: -- Deed dated 2nd June, 1759, being a Mortgage For £1500 by John Enery to William Crookshank. Deed dated 7th May, 1760, being an annuity granted to one Francis Enery, until the consideration money, £2000, paid off. Deed dated 1st October, 1763, whereby a term of years was created to raise £3,000, which was subsequently appointed to one Catherine Enery. Deed dated 21st December, 1771, being a Mortgage for £1,975 16s., by John Enery to George Tandy. Dated 29th day of April, 1853 Henry Carey, Secretary. {seal} John Collum, Solicitor, having carriage of the proceedings, 70, Talbot-street, Dublin.

Griffith's Valuation of 1857 lists twelve landholders in the townland.

The landlords of Cullion in the 1850s were William Magee and Robert Hutton.

== Census ==
Year	Population	Males	Females	Total Houses	Uninhabited
1841	67	37	30	12	0
1851	50	27	23	7	0
1861	54	31	23	9	0
1871	45	23	22	8	0
1881	55	24	31	10	0
1891	48	21	27	11	1

In the 1901 census of Ireland, there were eight families listed in the townland.

In the 1911 census of Ireland, there were eight families listed in the townland.

== Antiquities ==
1. A ringfort cashel. The 'Archaeological Inventory of County Cavan' (Site No. 1,188) (Dublin: Stationery Office, 1995) states- Circular area (int. diam. 46m) enclosed by the remains of a dry-stone wall (Width 3.5m). Site is divided into two unequal portions by a field boundary running NW-SE. Remains of outer wall at NW and SE. Original entrance not recognisable. Known locally as a 'fort'.
2. Lime-kilns.
3. Tircahan National School, Roll No. 7,769, was not actually in Tircahan townland. Griffith's Valuation of 1857 situates it in the neighbouring townland of Newtown (Kinawley) but the attached map actually shows it in the adjoining townland of Drumbar (Kinawley). The 1913 Ordnance Survey 25 map shows it as a new building situated in Cullion townland. In 1862 the headmaster was John O'Brien, a Roman Catholic who received an annual salary of £25-5s. There were 102 pupils in the school, 42 were Church of Ireland and 60 were Roman Catholic. There were 58 boys and 44 girls. The Catholic pupils were taught Prayer and the Roman Catholic Catechism on Saturdays from 12 noon to 12:30pm and then the Church of Ireland pupils were taught their Catechism from 12:30pm to 1pm. In 1874 the headmaster, a Roman Catholic, received an annual salary of £28-16s-8d. There were 88 pupils, 54 boys and 34 girls. In 1886 the headmaster, a Roman Catholic, received an annual salary of £59-14s-0d. There were 78 pupils, 46 boys and 32 girls. In 1890 there were 81 pupils. Folklore was collected in the school in the 1938 Dúchas collection.

The Dúchas collection has a story about the aforementioned teacher, John O'Brien (born 1836 - died c.1912)- There was another school in Drumbar. McCaffery gave the place of it free. The teacher, a man from Drumshambo whose name was John O'Brien, built it with his own two hands. There was any amount of stones in Drumbar and he got them free. Some of the neighbours carried them on their backs to him because carts were scarce in these days, and some gave him half a crown. Here is the way O'Brien lit on that spot for his school. He was teaching from one hedge school to another. This place was a sheltry one and he was walking past one day when he spied a bit of oaten cake on the ground. He sat and ate for he thought it was left there for luck and sure enough he had luck in the building for he never got a 'bac' in it, from the beginning to the end. He built it of rough stones without any mortar and thatched it with rushes. Everyone who went to the school had to bring two turfs, and there was always a good fire. John O'Brien was a strange character. His mother fell out with her own people and carried him on her back from the Midlands, to Drumshambo and then to Swanlinbar. She begged her way, and always said she'd make a priest or a schoolmaster of him. He was always a great learner, and had a great head for sums. He was a good whistler, a good singer and fiddler and was very fond of dancing and singing. If a young fellow passed by his house without singing or whistling he'd curse him for a druim an drú. Father John McGauran of Corlough told me he was at school with O'Brien before he went to Cavan College and that he got a ground work in Mathematics that placed him on top at all his exams in the college. Peter Drum of Drummersee, Peter, Hugh and Patrick McGovern, Gortnaleg were taught by O'Brien in the school at Drumbar. These joined the R.I.C. and the inspectors in each case asked what teacher was it taught them. Some of these rose to the rank of County Inspectors. O'Brien was a medium sized man with a long golden beard. He had an odious temper and would curse the children with all his might. He'd pray for them to be burning in the blue blazes of hell ten times a day. If a pair fell out, he'd take them out to the yard and make them box it out and be done with it. This happened nearly every day. The lads used to go to school in these days till they were man able. They wore white sleeved waistcoats, "courdaroy" trousers, shirts made from flax, and nether shoe nor sock. Every one had a few collops of oaten bread with him in his pockets to school. He used to kick the children and he had such a temper, he'd kill them if they wouldn't get out of the school & run for their lives. In the Summer time he used to go away to Meath to work on farms. He was coming back home one day and was travelling through the country all day long. He was dead out, and he went into a house for a drink. The good woman told him there was a shough outside. He went to a second, and a third to be told the same story. There were no shops in those days. Well he went into a fourth and the woman gave him a drink and asked him to sit down and take some dinner. He did so and asked her where she was from. She said Cavan. He went down on his two bare knees and gave his seven curses to all the women of Ireland except those of County Cavan. He often prayed for the curse of God to fall on any one called McGuire, and for the race to be extinguished root and branch for "his heart was broken trying to teach them". They were all very stupid. He used to go around all the houses to see who kept a tidy house, and God help any onewho was a "clatty trail". He visited all newly married people to see was the newcomer "clatty" or clean. If she were "clatty" that was his last visit: if she were clean he praised her in every place he went, and he praised all belonging to her too, and he visited her often. People were honoured by his visits for he was very interesting and good sport. He was good natured and very very kind to anyone in sickness or trouble. Brigid McGovern told me this story. About fifty years ago (1888) she was a young married woman with four children one of whom was very sick. The good man went to the fair in Swanlinbar and promised to be home early. Twelve o'clock came and no man came. O'Brien called in to see the child and said he was going to the fair and would put the man out home-which he did and left him out a quarter of a mile. O'Brien called that evening again to see the child. The man was there and he says to O'Brien "Where you in the fair I never seen you" "The devil blind you and may you never see me or any other one" replied O'Brien. Out with him out of the house without another word and away with him his best. He was no time gone till he was back again to hear how the child was. He sat down, took tea, and made a long caily. He had a very large family. They were all very wild, very fond of music and dancing. They all emigrated to America, toAustralia except one girl who is teaching in Co. Fermanagh but who is going out in pension this year. If a neighbour was making hay he'd send out a half dozen of big boys to give a hand at it in the middle of the day (from school). In the Spring time he often sent out a few children to gather "brosna" for a Brigid McGovern who lived in Drumbar beside the school. He died a very happy death when he was a few years over seventy. Kidney trouble caused it. He loved the Fenians, he loved Ireland and hated and cursed England every day he rose. During the Boer War he prayed every day that " the curse of God English might be swept into hell root and branch". He taught for a short time in Tiercahan and the day he left he gave the children a great feast of sweets, buns, loaf and tea. He was a great prayer and taught the children many and many a nice prayer. Here is one of them:-

There are four corners on my bed

There are four angels on its spread

Saint Matthew, Mark, Luke and John

God bless the bed that I lie on.
