= Alteen =

Townland in Ireland

Coordinates: 54°12′11.67″N 7°45′57.57″W

Alteen (Irish derived place name Ailtín, meaning ‘The Small Ravine’) is a townland in the civil parish of Kinawley, barony of Tullyhaw, County Cavan, Ireland. The local pronunciation is IL-Keen. A sub-division is called Tullynahunshin (Irish derived place name Tulaigh na-hUinsinn, meaning ‘The Hill of the Ash Trees’).

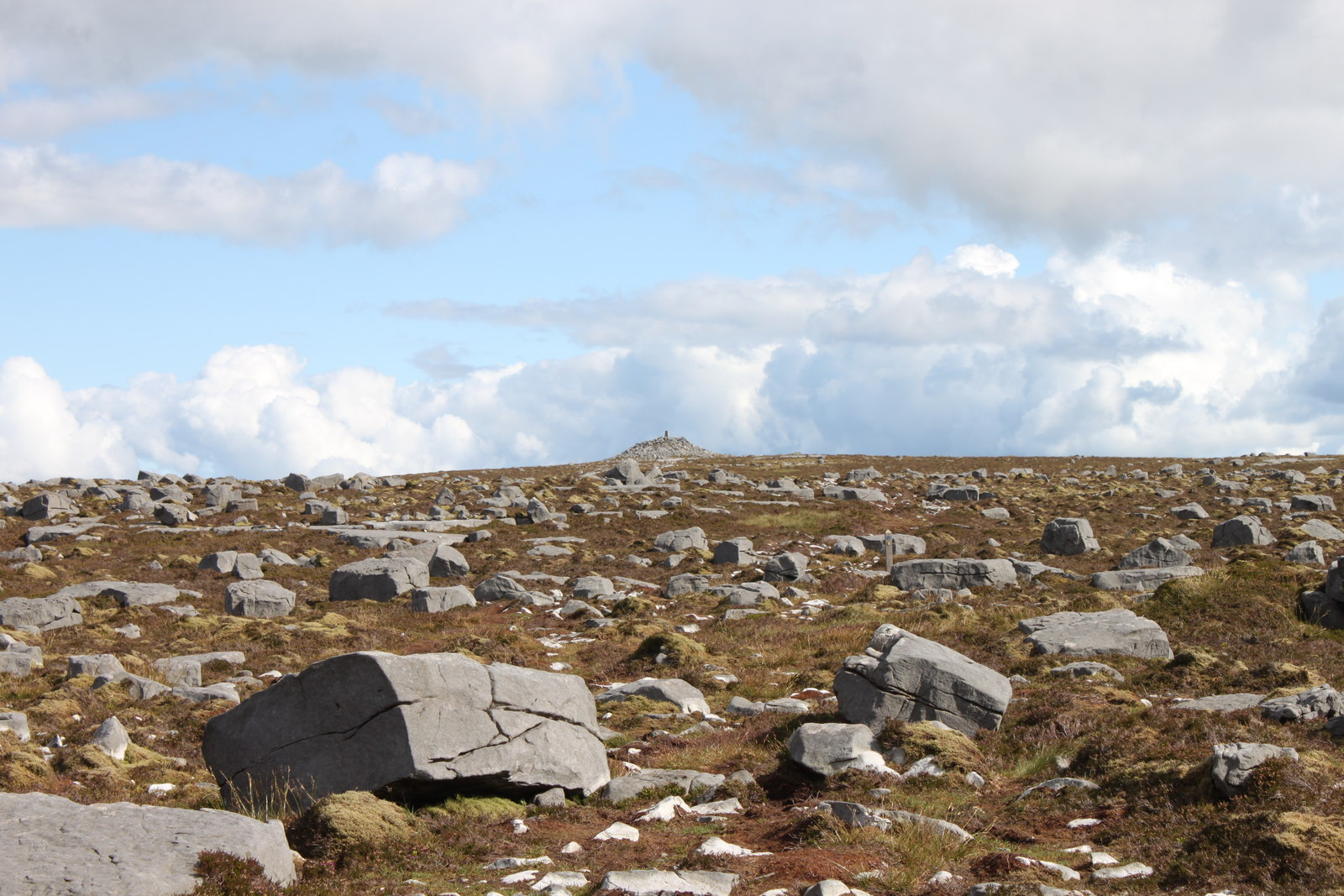
Cuilcagh Mountain Cairn and Landscape (geograph 2038072)

== Geography ==
Alteen is bounded on the north by Greenan townland, on the west by Aghatirourke, Beihy, Commas (Kinawley), Dunmakeever and Gortalughany townlands and on the east by Cloghoge, Corranearty, Moheranea and Monydoo (or Tonycrom) townlands. Its chief geographical features are Cuilcagh mountain which rises to 2,188 feet above sea level, Lough Cam (Gaelic meaning- ‘The Crooked Lake’), Lough Cratty (Gaelic Loch Cruite meaning- ‘The Lake of the Hill Summit’) (A tale about treasure in the lake is found in the 1938 Dúchas folklore collection.), Polladranta Pool, Pollprughlisk Cave System (Gaelic Poll Phrochlais, meaning ‘The Hole of the Badger’s Cave’), mountain pools, mountain streams, underground waterfalls, underground streams, river swallowholes, a sheepfold, a stone quarry, an abyss or ‘Sumera’, rocky outcrops, dug wells and forestry plantations. Alteen is traversed by minor public roads and rural lanes. The townland covers 1,149 statute acres.

== History ==
In the 1609 Plantation of Ulster, Alteen formed part of the mountain of Cuilcagh, granted to John Sandford of Castle Doe, Co. Donegal (the father-in-law of Thomas Guyllym of Ballyconnell) by letters patent dated 7 July 1613 (Pat. 11 James I – LXXI – 38, ‘Quilkagh’). It was later sold by Sandford to his wife's uncle Toby Caulfeild, 1st Baron Caulfeild, Master of the Ordnance and Caulfield had the sale confirmed by letters patent of 12 July 1620 (Pat. 19 James I. XI. 45 ‘‘Quilkagh’’).

The 1821 census spells the townland as Ilteen and states- Lands of Ilteen containing 51 acres of arable and pasture & 250 acres mountain. The 1834 Tithe Applotment Books spell the name as Elteen.

The 1836 Ordnance Survey Namebooks state- The whole townland is a large track of mountain. The Alteen Valuation Office Field books are available for 1838.

Griffith's Valuation lists twelve landholders in the townland. The landlord of Alteen in the 19th century was Robert Burrowes.

== Census ==
Year	Population	Males	Females	Total Houses	Uninhabited
1841	69	41	28	14	0
1851	52	27	25	13	0
1861	37	21	16	10	0
1871	43	22	21	7	0
1881	37	19	18	7	0
1891	40	20	20	7	0

In the Census of Ireland 1821, there were ten families living in the townland. In the 1901 census of Ireland, there were seven families listed in the townland, and in the 1911 census, there were six families listed.

== Antiquities ==
1. A stone cairn. Described in the ‘Archaeological Inventory of County Cavan’ (Site No. 123), Patrick O’Donovan, 1995, as- An almost circular cairn (diam. c. 16m; H 3.2m). The NE half of the site is enclosed by the remains of a substantial drystone wall. Situated on the summit of Cuilcagh Mountain on the border between counties Cavan and Fermanagh. The site was known as 'Lacht a mhac a whoole' commemorating McEnhill, chief of a clan driven out of Tyrone by the O'Neills. According to tradition the cairn was used as an inauguration site by the Maguires. In the late forties of this century workers tossed some stones and built a triangulation station on top of the monument (Glangevlin Guild ICA 1983, 42). There are three hut sites a short distance to SE (CV006-003001-, CV006-003002-, CV006-003003-). The website Glangevlin.com states- On the top of Cuilcagh are two monuments about three miles apart, one of which is only a small one called Lacht an Phelim from Phelim O'Dolan who was an ancient proprietor of Gleann Gaibhle. It was erected some centuries ago. The O'Dolans.were a wealthy family and owned the townland of Gub. The larger monument was known as Lacht a mhac a' Whoole from a ‘mac a' Whoole’ [McEnhill in English) the head of a clan who were driven out of Tyrone by the O'Neills centuries ago and fled to the mountains with a party of followers and stayed there until they were betrayed. This monument resembles a fort surrounded by a large wall of dry stone. Near this erection bee-hived shaped huts can be seen. These were probably built by the Tyrone clan. Some say that writers used them and that one night a terrible storm of thunder and lightning broke out and that those writers fled and never returned. In the late forties of this present century workers tossed some stones and built a triangulation station by night on the top of the monument. A date, June 11, 1949, is quite visible. Other stations were built at the same time all over Ireland and were used to map the country. In the fifties other work was carried out by night. Those monuments form part of the border between Cavan and Fermanagh but it is easier to reach them from the Cavan side. Dean Henry climbed in 1739 from this side. Many schools and colleges organise bus tours to the large monument as it is a tourist attraction. St. Patrick is said to have prayed at the Monument.
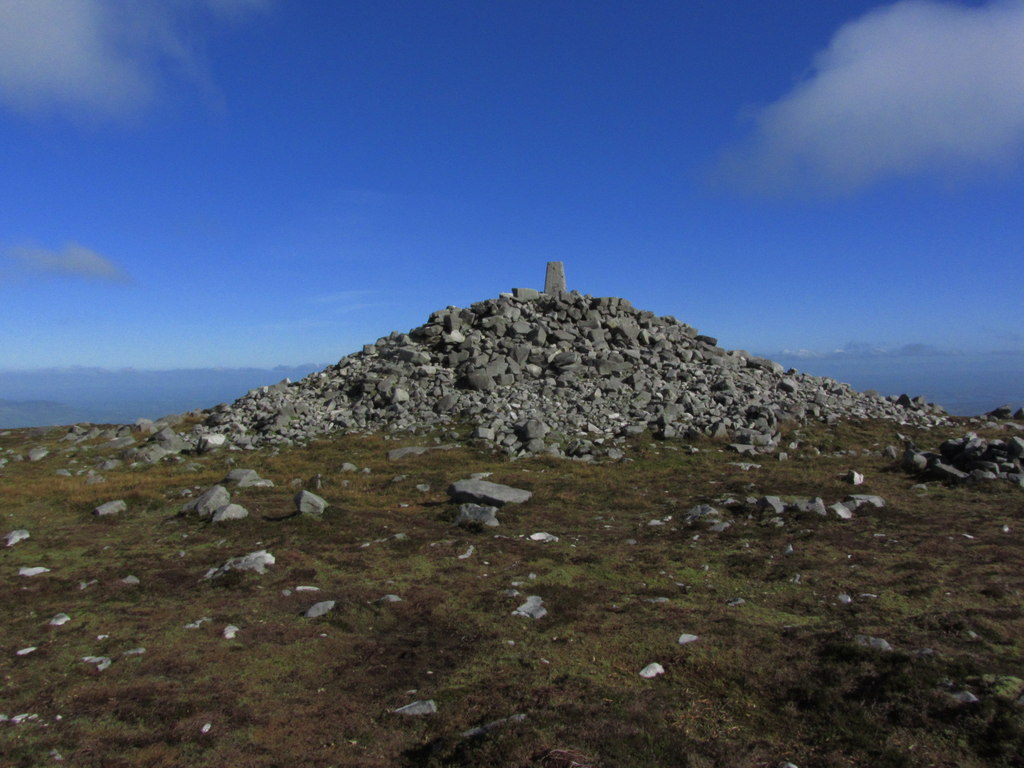
  Cuilcagh - Summit cairn & trig point (geograph 3762624)
2. A boundary mound. Described in the ‘Archaeological Inventory of County Cavan’ (Site No. 121), Patrick O’Donovan, 1995, as- In rough mountainous terrain. One of a series of mounds and cairns which mark the boundary between counties Cavan and Fermanagh. Remains comprise a low, roughly circular, poorly preserved mound (diam. c. 8m; H. c. 0.6m) mainly composed of peat.
3. A boundary mound. Described in the ‘Archaeological Inventory of County Cavan’ (Site No. 122), Patrick O’Donovan, 1995, as- In rough mountainous terrain. One of a series of mounds and cairns which mark the border between counties Cavan and Fermanagh. Remains comprise a low, roughly circular, ill-defined, poorly preserved mound (diam. c. 15.5m; H. c. 0.3m) composed mainly of peat.
4. Lime-kilns
5. Stone bridges over the river.
6. Stepping-stones over the streams
7. Fords over the streams
8. A tombstone inscribed- In memory of Rev. Father Maguire who departed on the ninth day of December 1766. R.I.P. The 1938 Dúchas folklore collection states- The writing is probably hand carved and is well done. It is about four feet high, and was dug up by a few men in 1938 and they also dug up some other parts of the field in which it was found to see if they could find any more old relics, but they did not find any.
