= Drumconra (or Lowforge) =

Townland in County Cavan, Ireland

Drumconra (Irish derived place name, either Droim Conradh, meaning ‘The Hill-Ridge of the Contract’ or Droim Conra, meaning ‘The Hill-Ridge belonging to Conra’) is a townland in the civil parish of Kinawley, barony of Tullyhaw, County Cavan, Ireland. The townland is also called Lowforge, meaning 'The Lower Forge' belonging to the 18th century Swanlinbar Iron Works.

== Geography ==
Drumconra is bounded on the north by Coragh and Stumpys Hill townlands in Co. Fermanagh, on the south by Furnaceland townland, on the west by Cornagran (Kinawley) and Hawkswood townlands and on the east by Gortoral, Co. Fermanagh and Uragh (Kinawley) townlands.

Its chief geographical features are the River Cladagh (Swanlinbar) and mountain streams. Drumconra is traversed by the Old Coach Road, minor public roads and rural lanes. The townland covers 190 statute acres. A sub-division is called The Coal Yard.

== History ==
In medieval times Drumconra was owned by the McGovern Clan and formed part of a ballybetagh spelled (variously) Aghycloony, Aghcloone, Nacloone, Naclone and Noclone (Irish derived place name Áth Chluain, meaning the ‘Ford of the Meadow’). The 1609 Baronial Map depicts the ballybetagh as Naclone.

In the Plantation of Ulster by grant dated 26 June 1615, King James VI and I granted, inter alia, The precinct or parcel of Nacloone otherwise Aghcloone to Sir George Graeme and Sir Richard Graeme to form part of the Manor of Greame. A history of Richard and George Graham is viewable online. The Grahams took part in the Irish Rebellion of 1641 and after the war their lands were confiscated under the Act for the Settlement of Ireland 1652.

By a lease dated 11 August 1736 Richard Cross of Dromomuniny, County Cavan, assigned, the lands of Hawkeswood, that is from the watercourse and Dromconra, to John Mahan, Innkeeper and William Mahan, Shopkeeper, both of Swadlingbar.

The 1821 Census of Ireland spells the name as Drumcondra and states- contains 90 acres of arable pasture & meadow, 10 acres thereof being bog, & different applotments are held by people who do not inhabit it.

The 1825 Tithe Applotment Books spell the name as Drumconra.

The 1836 Ordnance survey Namebooks state- Freestone is procured on the ground and is used for building.

The Drumconra Valuation Office Field books are available for August 1838.

The 1938 Dúchas collection states- The Coal Yard - a field belonging to Mr. Patrick McGoldrick, Drumcondra, Swanlinbar Co Cavan. Long ago iron was smelted there and there are traces of this under each sod that is dug up. Another sub-division is called The Fairy Field. The Dúchas collection states- This is owned by Mr Barney Kellaher, Drumcondra, Swanlinbar. There is a peculiar shaped stone in it which is never touched. It is said locally that one time a person who tried to remove it was found dead next morning and since then no one would touch it.

Griffith's Valuation lists eleven landholders in the townland.

== Census ==
Year	Population	Males	Females	Total Houses	Uninhabited
1841	66	40	26	13	0
1851	68	37	31	11	0
1861	23	16	7	4	0
1871	28	16	12	4	0
1881	40	19	21	5	0
1891	27	15	12	4	0

In the Census of Ireland 1821 there were seven households in the townland.

In the 1901 census of Ireland, there were four families listed in the townland.

In the 1911 census of Ireland, there were two families listed in the townland.

== Antiquities ==
1. A medieval earthen ringfort. The 'Archaeological Inventory of County Cavan', Site No. 582, (Dublin: Stationery Office, 1995) states- Raised circular area (int. diam. 31.5m) enclosed by a denuded inner earthen bank, a V-shaped fosse, outside of which is a possible berm enclosed by a substantial earthen bank, and a narrow external fosse. Breaks in external bank at SSE and WNW. No corresponding breaks in inner bank to indicate causewayed entrance. (CUCAP ALQ 19; ALQ 20). The 1938 Dúchas folklore collection states- There is a fort in the townland of Drumcondra near the village of Swanlinbar, Parish of Kinawley, Barony of Tullyhaw in County Cavan. It is a field owned by Mrs Young, Swanlinabar. It is a large round hill sloping down to a stream at the foot of the field. There are whitethorn bushes growing round it and a 'lone' bush in the centre. There are 4 openings on the fort and this suggests that it must have belonged to some person of importance.
2. A medieval earthen ringfort. The 'Archaeological Inventory of County Cavan', Site No. 583, (Dublin: Stationery Office, 1995) states- Raised circular area (int. diam. 33.2m) enclosed by an earthen bank and a wide fosse. NE half of site has been totally levelled (OPW 1988). Original entrance not recognisable.
3. Stepping-stones over the river.
