= Cornagran (Kinawley) =

Townland in County Cavan, Ireland

Cornagran (Irish derived place name, Corr na gCrann, meaning 'The Round Hill of the Trees') is a townland in the civil parish of Kinawley, barony of Tullyhaw, County Cavan, Ireland.

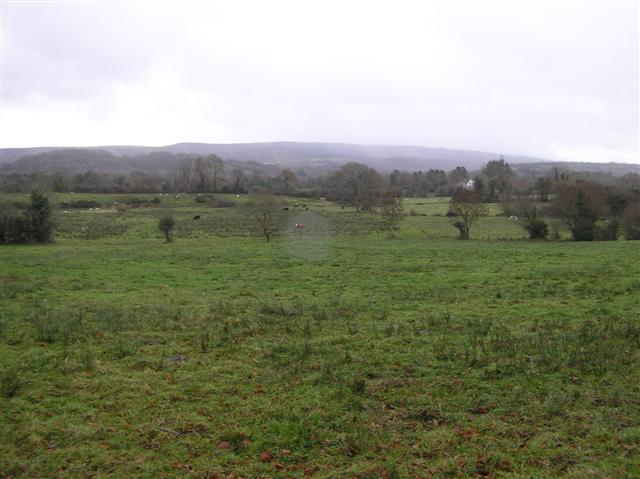
Cornagran Townland - geograph.org.uk - 1061069

== Geography ==
Cornagran is bounded on the north by Stumpys Hill townland in Co. Fermanagh, on the south by Hawkswood townland, on the west by Cloghoge townland and on the east by Coragh, Co. Fermanagh, and Drumconra (or Lowforge) townlands. Its chief geographical features are a forestry plantation, mountain streams and dug wells. Cornagran is traversed by the national secondary N87 road (Ireland), the Old Coach Road, minor public roads and rural lanes. The townland covers 90 statute acres.

== History ==
In medieval times, Cornagran was owned by the McGovern Clan and formed part of a ballybetagh spelled (variously) Aghycloony, Aghcloone, Nacloone, Naclone and Noclone (Irish derived place name Áth Chluain, meaning the 'Ford of the Meadow'). The 1609 Baronial Map depicts the ballybetagh as Naclone.

At the start of the Plantation of Ulster, by grant dated 26 June 1615, King James VI and I granted, inter alia, The precinct or parcel of Nacloone otherwise Aghcloone to Sir George Graeme and Sir Richard Graeme to form part of the Manor of Greame. A history of Richard and George Graham is viewable online. The Grahams took part in the Irish Rebellion of 1641, and after the war their lands were confiscated under the Act for the Settlement of Ireland 1652.

The 1821 Census of Ireland spells the name as Cornagran and states- containing 42 acres of pasture & 6 acres thereof being bog, different applotments are held by persons who do not live on the land.

The 1825 Tithe Applotment Books spell the name as Cornagran.

The Cornagran Valuation Office Field books are available for August 1838.

Griffith's Valuation lists nine landholders in the townland.

The landlord of Cornagran in the 19th century was Robert Burrowes.

Folklore about Cornagran is found in the 1938 Dúchas collection.

== Census ==
Year	Population	Males	Females	Total Houses	Uninhabited
1841	65	30	35	13	0
1851	38	20	18	7	0
1861	35	21	14	7	0
1871	42	23	19	7	0
1881	25	13	12	6	0
1891	37	19	18	8	1

In the Census of Ireland 1821 there were thirteen households in the townland.

In the 1901 census of Ireland, there were eight families listed in the townland.

In the 1911 census of Ireland, there were twelve families listed in the townland.

== Antiquities ==
1. A foot-bridge over the river.
2. Cornagran National School.
