= Corranearty =

Townland in County Cavan, Ireland

Corranearty (Irish derived place name, either Corr an Iarta, meaning ‘The Round Hill of the Fireplace Hob’ or Corr an Fhearta, meaning ‘The Round Hill of the Grave’) is a townland in the civil parish of Kinawley, barony of Tullyhaw, County Cavan, Ireland.

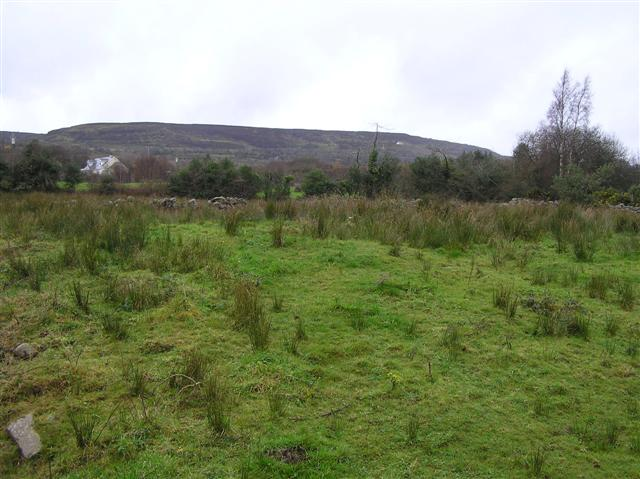
Corranearly Townland - geograph.org.uk - 1061080

== Geography ==
Corranearty is bounded on the north by Cloghoge townland, on the west by Alteen and Monydoo (or Tonycrom) townland and on the east by Hawkswood townland. Its chief geographical features are mountain streams, a pond, a forestry plantation and dug wells. Corranearty is traversed by minor public roads and rural lanes. The townland covers 90 statute acres.

== History ==
In medieval times Corranearty was owned by the McGovern Clan and formed part of a ballybetagh spelled (variously) Aghycloony, Aghcloone, Nacloone, Naclone and Noclone (Irish derived place name Áth Chluain, meaning the ‘Ford of the Meadow’). The 1609 Baronial Map depicts the ballybetagh as Naclone.

In the Plantation of Ulster by grant dated 26 June 1615, King James VI and I granted, inter alia, The precinct or parcel of Nacloone otherwise Aghcloone to Sir George Graeme and Sir Richard Graeme to form part of the Manor of Greame. The Grahams took part in the Irish Rebellion of 1641 and after the war their lands were confiscated under the Act for the Settlement of Ireland 1652.

The 1821 Census of Ireland spells the name as Correnarty and Cornarty and states- contains 33 acres of pasture & 4 acres of bog.

The 1825 Tithe Applotment Books spell the name as Clonartys.

The Corranearty (spelled Corancarty) Valuation Office Field books are available for August 1838.

Griffith's Valuation lists nine landholders in the townland.

The landlord of Corranearty in the 19th century was Robert Burrowes.

== Census ==
Year	Population	Males	Females	Total Houses	Uninhabited
1841	48	23	25	10	0
1851	33	17	16	6	0
1861	41	22	19	7	0
1871	37	23	14	6	0
1881	26	15	11	7	0
1891	23	13	10	7	1

In the Census of Ireland 1821 there were seven households in the townland.

In the 1901 census of Ireland, there were eight families listed in the townland.

In the 1911 census of Ireland, there were five families listed in the townland.

== Antiquities ==
1. A foot-bridge over the river.
