= Cloghoge =

Townland in County Cavan, Ireland

Coordinates: 54°12′8″N 7°42′42″W

Cloghoge (Irish derived place name, Clochóg, meaning ‘Stony Place’) is a townland in the civil parish of Kinawley, barony of Tullyhaw, County Cavan, Ireland.

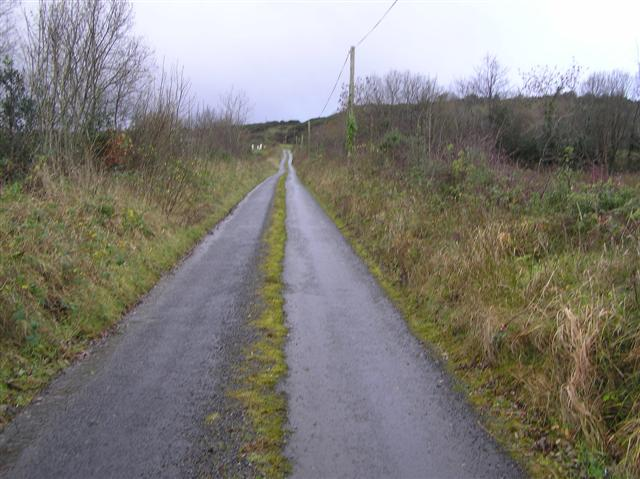
Road at Cloghoge - geograph.org.uk - 1061086

== Geography ==
Cloghoge is bounded on the north by Drumcullion townland in Co. Fermanagh, on the west by Alteen, Corranearty and Moheranea, Co. Fermanagh townlands and on the east by Cornagran (Kinawley), Hawkswood and Stumpys Hill, Co. Fermanagh townlands. Its chief geographical features are mountain streams. Cloghoge is traversed by the national secondary N87 road (Ireland), minor public roads and rural lanes. The townland covers 146 statute acres.

== History ==
In medieval times Cloghoge was owned by the McGovern Clan and formed part of a ballybetagh spelled (variously) Aghycloony, Aghcloone, Nacloone, Naclone and Noclone (Irish derived place name Áth Chluain, meaning the ‘Ford of the Meadow’). The 1609 Baronial Map depicts the ballybetagh as Naclone.

In the Plantation of Ulster by grant dated 26 June 1615, King James VI and I granted, inter alia, The precinct or parcel of Nacloone otherwise Aghcloone to Sir George Graeme and Sir Richard Graeme to form part of the Manor of Greame. A history of Richard and George Graham is viewable online. The Grahams took part in the Irish Rebellion of 1641 and after the war their lands were confiscated under the Act for the Settlement of Ireland 1652.

The 1821 Census of Ireland spells the name as Cloughoge and Cloughlog and Cloughlough and states- containing 67 acres of arable & pasture lands.

The 1825 Tithe Applotment Books spell the name as Clohoges.

The Cloghoge Valuation Office Field books are available for August 1838.

Griffith's Valuation lists fifteen landholders in the townland.

The landlord of Cloghoge in the 19th century was Robert Burrowes.

Poems by Thomas McGoldrick, a resident of the townland, are in the 1938 Dúchas collection.

== Census ==
Year	Population	Males	Females	Total Houses	Uninhabited
1841	66	28	38	14	0
1851	48	23	25	9	0
1861	42	19	23	10	0
1871	41	17	24	9	0
1881	42	21	21	8	0
1891	43	20	23	8	0

In the Census of Ireland 1821 there were nine households in the townland.

In the 1901 census of Ireland, there were eight families listed in the townland.

In the 1911 census of Ireland, there were twelve families listed in the townland.

== Antiquities ==
1. St. Mary’s Roman Catholic Presbytery. The website www.buildingsofireland.ie states- Detached L-plan three-bay two-storey presbytery, built c.1900, with projecting gable-fronted south bay having canted bay window at ground level, projecting entrance bay to inner corner, two-storey flat roofed return, and single-storey extension to rear. Pitched slate roof with clay ridge tiles, overhanging eaves and verges, decorative uPVC fascias, and bargeboards. Vitrified brick chimneystacks to ridges with moulded yellow brick bands of houndstooth detail. Replacement uPVC gutters with cast-iron rainwater downpipes. Smooth rendered walls with raised rendered block-and-start quoins and plinth, coved houndstooth cornice to eaves of bay window, now obscured by fascia. Recent pebbledash finish to rear elevation and extensions. Square-headed window openings having pedimented hoods on scroll brackets both of cast tinted concrete to ground floor and gables. Segmental-headed window opening with segmental hood of same profile on similar brackets to first floor. Windows without hoods to canted bay and smaller windows to upper level and side of entrance bay. Replacement uPVC windows and stone sills throughout. Replacement uPVC door with side and overlights in segmental-headed opening with hood moulding. Outbuildings to rear reached through decorative ironwork double gates with vegetal motifs. Setback from road behind recent rendered boundary wall with wrought-iron gates. Appraisal- Built for the Roman Catholic priest of Swanlinbar, this late nineteenth-century presbytery of picturesque form is a significant landmark on the northern outskirts of the town. Despite renovation and the replacement of some of the historic fabric, the house retains noteworthy features including vitrified brick chimneystacks, decorative hood mouldings, and decorative wrought-iron gates. It is an interesting reminder of the high quality accommodation built by the Roman Catholic church for its clergy at the turn of the century.
2. Stepping-stones over the river.
